= Berlin-Peck Memorial Library =

Coordinates: 41.6278°N 72.7705°W

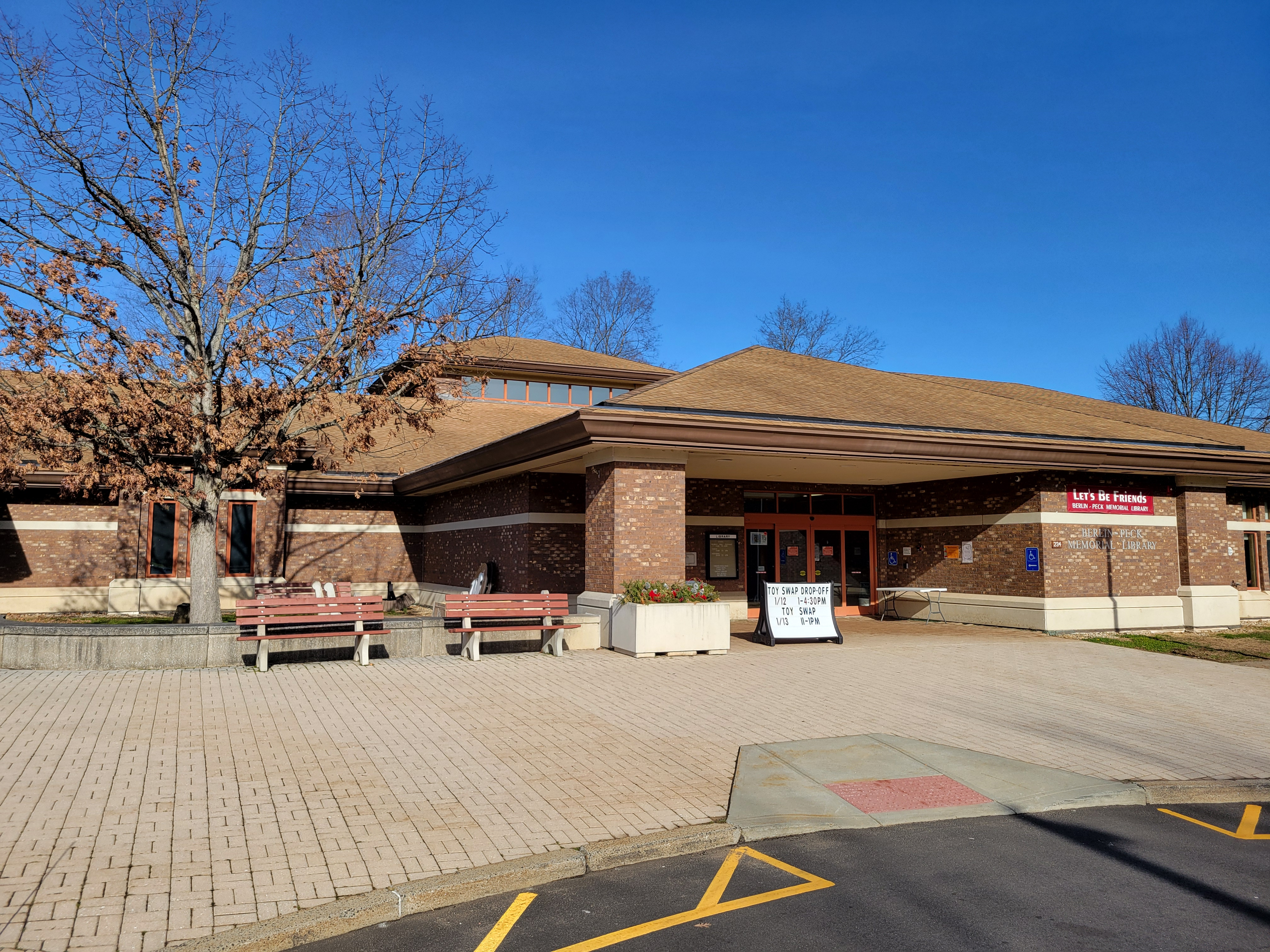
- Berlin-Peck Memorial Library
- Location: 234 Kensington Road; Berlin, Connecticut

Collection
- Size: 107,364 items (94,646 print)

Other information
- Director: Carrie Tyszka
- Employees: 5 full time employees
- Website: www.berlinpeck.org

The Berlin-Peck Memorial Library is a public library in Berlin, Connecticut. The original library was founded in 1829. The library was relocated to a new facility at 234 Kensington Road in 1989. The library serves a population of 20,137. The total collection consists of 107,364 items (94,646 print). Special collections include town histories of Berlin, East Berlin and Kensington in the David and Ann Borthwick Local History Room.
