= Willow Brook Connector =

- Map of Hartford County in northern Connecticut with Willow Brook Connector highlighted in red

Route information
- Length: 1.52 mi (2.45 km)
- Existed: 1961–present
- Component highways: SR 571 (unsigned) entire length

Major junctions
- West end: Route 71A / Route 372 in Berlin
- East end: Route 9 / Route 71 in Berlin

Location
- Country: United States
- State: Connecticut
- Counties: Hartford

Highway system
- Connecticut State Highway System; Interstate; US; State; SSR; SR; Scenic

The Willow Brook Connector is a 1.45-mile (2.33 km) freeway in the town of Berlin, Connecticut. The road is designated but not signed as State Road 571. It gets its name from Willow Brook Park, which begins on the north side of the roadway as one heads into the city of New Britain, or to New Britain Stadium for a baseball game.

== Route description ==
The freeway begins at the intersection of Route 71A (High Road) and Route 372 (Corbin Avenue) at the northern end of Berlin (near the New Britain city line). It proceeds eastward through Willow Brook and Hungerford Parks. The freeway has an interchange with Route 71 about 0.9 miles (1.4 km) later. The freeway ends half a mile later as it merges into southbound Route 9. Access from Route 9 is only possible from the northbound direction via Exit 34.

== History ==
The road opened in the early 1960s when what would become the Route 72 Expressway (part of Route 9 today) opened from this road south to the junction of the Berlin Turnpike (US 5/Route 15) in Berlin. The entire highway has also been designated as part of the Polish Legion of American Veterans Memorial Highway.

== Exit list ==
As part of a signing project in 2020, the Route 71 exit will receive a number. The entire route is in Berlin, Hartford County.

mi	km	Exit	Destinations	Notes
0.00	0.00	—	Route 71A / Route 372 – Berlin, New Britain, Plainville	Western terminus; at-grade intersection
0.93	1.50	1	Route 71 – Kensington, New Britain	
1.52	2.45	—	Route 9 south – Middletown	Eastern terminus; exit 34 on Route 9 north
1.000 mi = 1.609 km; 1.000 km = 0.621 mi: Incomplete access
