= Kensington Soldier's Monument =

- Kensington Soldiers' Monument
- U.S. National Register of Historic Places
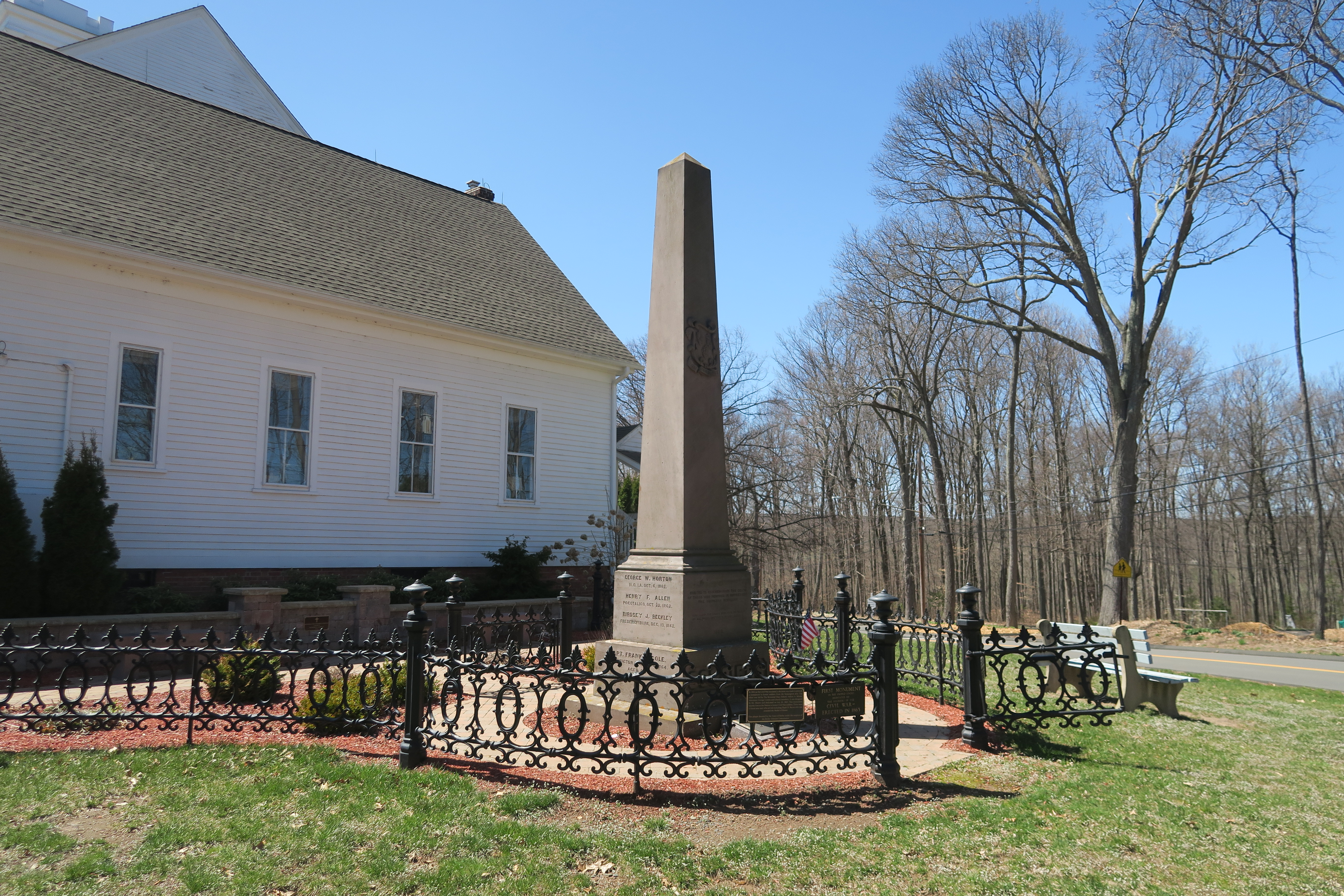
- Kensington Soldiers' Monument

- Location within Connecticut Location within the United States
- Location: 312 Percival Avenue, Berlin, Connecticut
- Coordinates: 41°37′22″N 72°46′59″W
- Area: less than one acre
- Built: 1863
- Architect: Moore, Nelson Augustus
- NRHP reference No.: 13000456
- Added to NRHP: July 3, 2013

The Kensington Soldiers' Monument is a historic war memorial located at 312 Percival Road, on the grounds of the Kensington Congregational Church in Berlin, Connecticut. Erected in 1863, it is one of the oldest memorials to the American Civil War in the United States, and the first to be erected in Connecticut. It is a modest brownstone obelisk, with an accompanying cannon. It was listed on the National Register of Historic Places in 2013.

== Description and history ==
The Kensington Soldiers' Monument is located in front of the Kensington Congregational Church, at the junction of Percival Avenue and Sheldon Street in Berlin's Kensington neighborhood. The memorial is a brownstone obelisk 20 feet (6.1 m) in height, mounted in a two-part base 28 inches (71 cm) in height. Each face of the obelisk is engraved with inscriptions, that on the southeast naming the four Kensington men killed in 1863, and that on the southwest naming eight more killed in 1864 and 1865. Two plaques have been attached to the monument, identifying it as the first monument in the nation dedicated to Civil War dead.

Impetus for the erection of the monument originated with the Rev. Elias Brewster Hillard of the Kensington Congregational Church in 1862, upon learning of six Kensington dead in Civil War battles. The monument was designed by Nelson Augustus Moore, a prominent Connecticut sculptor, and was cut in a Berlin stone yard from brownstone quarried in Portland. It was formally dedicated on July 28, 1863, with a speech by United States Senator Lafayette S. Foster. It is distinct from many later Civil War memorials, which tend to include figures of soldiers. A period cannon was placed in front of the monument during semi-centennial commemoration of the monument in 1913.

== See also ==
- National Register of Historic Places listings in Hartford County, Connecticut
