= 2012 Big East Conference baseball tournament =

American college baseball tournament

- 2012 Big East baseball tournament logo
- Teams: 8
- Format: Double-elimination tournament
- Finals site: Bright House Field; Clearwater, FL
- Champions: St. John's (7th title)
- Winning coach: Ed Blankmeyer (3rd title)
- MVP: Matt Carasiti (St. John's)
- Television: ESPNU (championship game)

2012 Big East Conference baseball standings
	Conf.						Overall
Team	W		L		T	PCT	W		L		T	PCT
#25 Louisville †^{y} ‍‍‍	18	–	9	–	0	.667	42	–	22	–	0	.656
St. John's ‍†‍‡‍^{y}	18	–	9	–	0	.667	40	–	23	–	0	.635
Seton Hall ‍‍‍	17	–	10	–	0	.630	34	–	24	–	0	.586
South Florida ‍‍‍	17	–	10	–	0	.630	38	–	22	–	0	.633
Connecticut ‍‍‍	16	–	11	–	0	.593	31	–	27	–	1	.534
Rutgers ‍‍‍	16	–	11	–	0	.593	31	–	25	–	0	.554
Notre Dame ‍‍‍	14	–	13	–	0	.519	31	–	27	–	0	.534
Pittsburgh ‍‍‍	10	–	17	–	0	.370	28	–	28	–	0	.500
Georgetown ‍‍‍	10	–	17	–	0	.370	24	–	29	–	0	.453
Villanova ‍‍‍	10	–	17	–	0	.370	28	–	27	–	0	.509
West Virginia ‍‍‍	9	–	18	–	0	.333	23	–	32	–	0	.418
Cincinnati ‍‍‍	7	–	20	–	0	.259	18	–	38	–	0	.321
† – Conference champion ‡ – Tournament champion y – Invited to the NCAA tournament As of June 15, 2012; Rankings from Coaches' Poll

The 2012 Big East Conference baseball tournament was held from May 23 to May 27 at Bright House Field in Clearwater, FL. It was an eight-team double elimination tournament. The winner, St. John's, received the league's automatic bid to the 2012 NCAA Division I baseball tournament. This marked the Red Storm's seventh tournament championship, the most of any Big East team.

== Format and seeding ==
The top eight teams in the Big East were seeded one through eight based on their regular season finish. St. John's was the first to clinch a spot in the tournament.

Team	W	L	Pct.	GB	Seed
Louisville	18	9	.667	–	1
St. John's	18	9	.667	–	2
Seton Hall	17	10	.630	1	3
South Florida	17	10	.630	1	4
Connecticut	16	11	.593	2	5
Rutgers	16	11	.593	2	6
Notre Dame	14	13	.519	4	7
Pittsburgh	10	17	.370	8	8
Georgetown	10	17	.370	8	–
Villanova	10	17	.370	8	–
West Virginia	9	18	.333	9	–
Cincinnati	7	20	.259	11	–

== Bracket ==
First round
6	Rutgers	1
3	Seton Hall	6
7	Notre Dame	2
2	St. John's	12
7	Notre Dame	9
6	Rutgers	0
8	Pittsburgh	4
1	Louisville	8
5	Connecticut	7
4	South Florida	2
4	South Florida	12
8	Pittsburgh	5

Second round
3	Seton Hall	3
2	St. John's	6
3	Seton Hall	3
7	Notre Dame	4
1	Louisville	1
5	Connecticut	4
1	Louisville	1
4	South Florida	6

Semifinals
2	St. John's	2	—
7	Notre Dame	1	—
5	Connecticut	0	1
4	South Florida	1	2

Final
4	South Florida	3
2	St. John's	7

== All-Tournament Team ==
The following players were named to the All-Tournament Team

Pos	Name	School
P	Matt Carasiti	St. John's
P	Derrick Stultz	USF
C	Danny Bethea	St. John's
IF	L. J. Mazzilli	Connecticut
IF	Trey Mancini	Notre Dame
IF	Frank Schwindel	St. John's
IF	Matt Wessinger	St. John's
OF	Jeremy Baltz	St. John's
OF	Jimmy Falla	USF
OF	James Ramsay	USF
DH	Zach Lauricella	St. John's

=== Jack Kaiser Award ===
Matt Carasiti earned the Jack Kaiser Award for the tournament most outstanding player. Carasiti, a pitcher for St. John's, earned the win in two of the Red Storm's four games, including the championship game.
