= Berlin High School (Connecticut) =

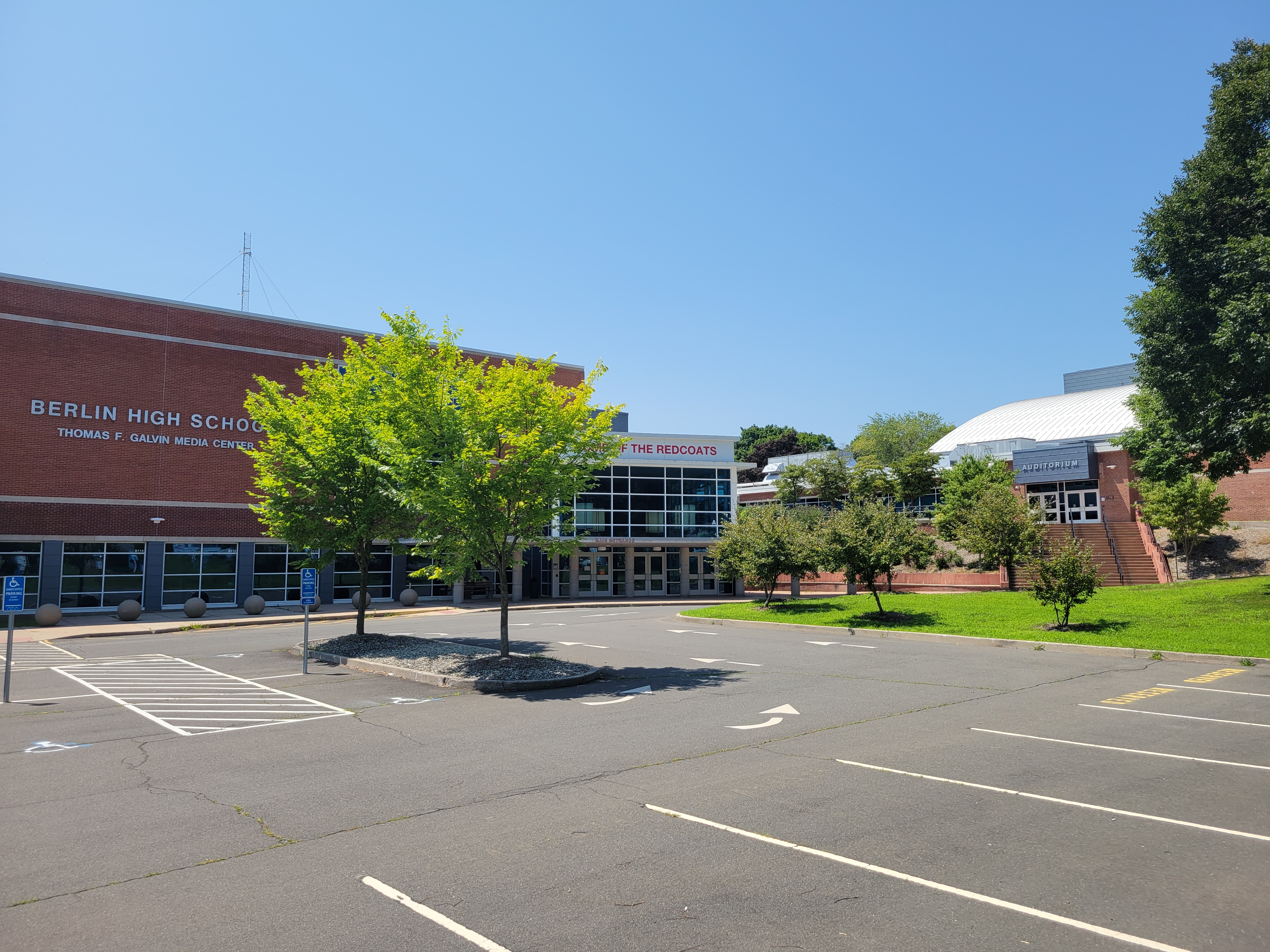

Location
- 139 Patterson Way; Berlin, Connecticut 06037; United States; 41°37′18″N 72°45′10″W

Information
- Type: Public school
- Established: 1953 (73 years ago)
- School district: Berlin School District
- Superintendent: Brian Benigni
- CEEB code: 070020
- Principal: Katie Amenta
- Teaching staff: 70.40 (FTE)
- Grades: 9-12
- Enrollment: 835 (2023–2024)
- Student to teacher ratio: 11.86
- Colors: Red, white, blue
- Team name: Redcoats
- Newspaper: The Redcoat Review
- Yearbook: The Lamp
- Website: bhs.berlinschools.org

Berlin High School is a public high school located in Berlin, Connecticut, United States.

== Overview ==
The current high school building on Patterson Way was opened in 1953.

Berlin High School operates WERB.

An addition was added to the high school in 1959, which included science labs and other rooms. An addition was constructed in 1975 housing the Media Center, the main gym and locker rooms, industrial arts rooms, cafeteria, and several science rooms. It also underwent technology and handicap code upgrades that were completed in 2000. An additional round of code renovations is forthcoming, in response to areas of concern identified by a recent visit by the New England Association of Schools and Colleges.

== History ==
- Pre-1931 – East Berlin students attended Middletown High; Berlin and Kensington students attended New Britain, Meriden or Lewis High in Southington.
- 1931 – An addition to Kensington Grammar School for grades 8 and 9.
- 1932 – Grade 10 added.
- 1934 – Grade 11 added.
- 1935 – Grade 12 added. Full high school program offered.
- 1953 – New high school on Patterson Way opened.
- 1959 – An addition to the high school built for more classroom and science area.
- 1975 – An addition is built, housing the Media Center, the main gym and locker rooms, industrial arts rooms, cafeteria, and several science rooms.
- 1985 – Celebration of Berlin High School's golden anniversary.
- 1998 – BHS Awarded 10 year Accreditation by the New England Association of Schools and Colleges.
- 2008 – Renovations to restrooms and public areas that would be visited by the New England Association of Schools and Colleges during the accreditation visit.
- 2008 – Track renovated.
- 2008 – Security cameras installed at the school.
- 2012 – Renovations and partial reconstruction began on the computer laboratories and science classrooms.
- 2017 – The BHS Renovate "As New" project is completed in November 2017. The renovation updates and improves all classrooms spaces on the second floor including new Science Laboratories, a new greenhouse, and a redecorated senior courtyard. A reconfiguration of the first floor created space for a new Radio Station, TV studio, Family and Consumer Science labs, English and Social Studies classrooms, a new state-of-the-art Weight Room and Exercise Facility, new Office Spaces for Administration, Guidance, the Athletic Dept. as well as the School Nurse. The renovation also created the Annex Building which houses new Tech-Ed classrooms and laboratories. Finally, an enlarged and improved Auditorium was constructed that features state-of-the-art lighting, sound and video capabilities.

== Campus ==
The Berlin High School building on Patterson Way houses all the educational rooms of the school. There are 75 classrooms, two gymnasiums, music rooms, and various other supporting rooms. The campus also includes a newly renovated outdoor track, practice football field, soccer field, tennis courts, two basketball courts, and a softball field.

The high school was under reconstruction as of May 2013 and scheduled to be completed in 2017. This was delayed by snow storms in December 2012 and January 2013, with the project being completed as of September 2016.

== Notable alumni ==
- Mauro Gozzo, former pitcher, MLB
- Gary Waslewski, former pitcher, MLB
- Jesse Carlson, reliever, MLB, Boston Red Sox
- Matt Carasiti, pitcher, MLB, Colorardo Rockies
- Austin Stowell, actor
