= WERB =

- Berlin, Connecticut; United States
- Broadcast area: Hartford
- Frequency: 94.5 MHz
- Branding: Berlin High School Radio

Programming
- Format: Non-commercial educational, FreeForm

Ownership
- Owner: Berlin Board of Education

Technical information
- Licensing authority: FCC
- Facility ID: 4826
- Class: D
- ERP: 24 watts
- HAAT: -21 meters
- Transmitter coordinates: 41°37′18″N 72°45′13″W

Links
- Public license information: Public file; LMS
- Webcast: WERB live stream
- Website: Official station site

WERB is the call sign of the FM non-commercial educational high school radio station licensed to the Berlin Board of Education in Berlin, Connecticut. The studios are located at Berlin High School.

WERB has served the school and the community for over 30 years. The station's radio format is eclectic FreeForm consisting of student and faculty programs. The station's 9-watt Class D FM signal covers all of Berlin as well as parts of Southington, New Britain, West Hartford, Kensington, Newington, and the rest of the Greater Hartford area.

WERB is mainly run by the Berlin High School Radio Club and its faculty advisor Chris Wolfe. Students are trained to be DJs, radio hosts and announcers by upperclassmen experienced in broadcasting. The high school radio station broadcasts local news and sports in addition to music. The radio station's radio format varies from hour to hour. All music played on the station is free of profanity and overt sexual overtones. Early mornings consist of easy-listening jazz, 10:00am to 2:00pm consists of country, and afternoons from 2:00 to 5:00 is rock. An automated program keeps content on the air during times when students are not available. On air requests can be made by calling (860) 828-6577, extension 316, or (860) 828-0606.

Alumni of the station include Chris Ryan of 102.9 WDRC-FM, Greg Horbal of emo/punk bands My Heart To Joy and The World Is a Beautiful Place & I Am No Longer Afraid to Die, and screenwriter and author Edward Savio (author of Idiots in the Machine) who was the station's first DJ.

The station is licensed to Berlin, Connecticut, United States. The station is owned by the Berlin Board of Education.
