= Mooreland Hill School =

Coordinates: 41.6431°N 72.7956°W

- Kensington, Connecticut; United States

Information
- Type: Co-ed, Private
- Motto: "scire valere" knowledge is strength
- Established: 1930
- Closed: 2019
- Head of School: Reed Rathgeber
- Faculty: 12
- Enrollment: 40
- Student to teacher ratio: 4:1
- Campus: 6.4 acres (26,000 m^{2})
- Colors: Green and White
- Website: mooreland.org%20mooreland.org

Mooreland Hill School was an independent Kindergarten to Grade 9 school located in Kensington, Connecticut. It is a member of the Connecticut Association of Independent Schools (CAIS) and National Association of Independent Schools (NAIS).

== History ==
=== The Modern Era ===
Reed Rathgeber became the first female to be the Head of School in 2015. She is an alumna of Mooreland Hill School (class of 1996) and a graduate of Westminster School, St. Lawrence University (B.A), and Simmons College (M.A.T). Prior to coming to Mooreland Hill, Ms. Rathgeber was a 7th and 8th grade history and English teacher at The Pierce School in Brookline, MA.

== Athletics ==
Sports:
Fall: Soccer, Field Hockey
Winter: Basketball, Hiking
Spring: Baseball, Softball, Tennis
