= Connecticut Route 72 =

State highway in Connecticut, US

Route 72
- Map of central Connecticut with Route 72 highlighted in red

Route information
- Maintained by CTDOT
- Length: 20.05 mi (32.27 km)
- Existed: 1932–present

Major junctions
- West end: Route 4 in Harwinton
- I-84 / Route 372 in Plainville; I-84 in New Britain
- East end: Route 9 / Route 71 / Route 174 in New Britain

Location
- Country: United States
- State: Connecticut
- Counties: Litchfield, Hartford

Highway system
- Connecticut State Highway System; Interstate; US; State; SSR; SR; Scenic
| ← Route 71 | → Route 73 |

Route 72 is a state highway in the western part of the Greater Hartford area. Route 72 is an L-shaped route with a north–south section in Plymouth and Harwinton and an east–west section from Bristol to New Britain. Route 72 is a freeway from Route 9 in New Britain to Route 372 in Plainville. Although ConnDOT logs it as a north-south route, it is signed as east-west.

The plan to extend the highway through the Forestville section of Bristol as a four-lane expressway is complete. The construction project broke ground on October 15, 2007 and was completed in the spring of 2011. The contractor for the project was Manafort Brothers, based out of Plainville. The new section of Route 72 opened on September 27, 2010.

== Route description ==
Route 72 begins as a four-lane freeway at Route 9 in New Britain, expanding to six lanes after the junction with Route 71 at Exit 9. Route 72 overlaps with I-84 as it crosses from New Britain into the town of Plainville. In Plainville, Route 72 has an exit to and from Route 372, an eastbound on-ramp from Route 10 via Route 372 and SR 511, and an eastbound offramp to Woodford Avenue (SR 536). After crossing the Pequabuck River, it has a partial interchange with Route 177 before the freeway ends at Forestville Avenue and the western terminus of Route 372. Route 72 continues, crossing Forestville Avenue as a four-lane expressway to the Bristol town line. Within Bristol, Route 72 runs 5.5 miles (8.9 km) along several streets. It continues on the four-lane expressway (known as the E. Bartlett Barnes Highway) to Pine Street, where it becomes a four-lane boulevard, and follows Pine Street to Riverside Avenue and crosses the Pequabuck River before intersecting with Route 229. Route 72 continues on Riverside Avenue, Main Street, School Street (intersecting Route 69), Divinity Street, Park Street, and Terryville Road. The route runs parallel to the Peqaubuck River in Bristol and crosses it several times. Route 72 then enters the town of Plymouth, where the road turns north to follow South Riverside Avenue, North Riverside Avenue, and Poland Brook Road. Route 72 intersects with US 6 in the Terryville section of town, then continues north in the rural town of Harwinton where it goes along Terryville Road, eventually ending at Route 4. Route 72 is 20.10 miles (32.35 km) long.

The section of Route 72 from Route 9 to Route 372 (Corbin Avenue) in New Britain is also known as the Thaddeus Kosciuszko Highway. The section from Route 372 (Corbin Avenue) in New Britain to the freeway end at the Plainville-Bristol town line is also known as the Polish Legion of American Veterans Memorial Highway. The section in Bristol from the Plainville town line to Pine Street is also known as the E Bartlett Barnes Highway.

== History ==
Route 72 was established in the 1932 state highway renumbering between Route 66 (then Route 14) in Middletown to Route 10 in Plainville. Since then, the route has been extended west and north and relocated to an expressway. The original route has been transferred to Routes 3 and 372. In 1942, a portion of US 6 in Bristol and Plymouth was transferred to Route 72 after a realignment of US 6 to use former US 6A. Another section of Route 72 was realigned in Berlin the same year with the construction of an interchange with the Berlin Turnpike. In 1954, the former Routes 117 (Bristol to Torrington) and 49 (Torrington to Norfolk) were transferred to Route 72, extending the route through Torrington to the Massachusetts state line.

In 1962, the section of Route 72 north of modern Route 4 was transferred to a relocated Route 4 and a new Route 272, resulting in the current northern/western terminus. The section from Plainville to Berlin was later upgraded to an expressway. In 1978, the old surface route of Route 72 was assigned as Route 372. In 1990, a freeway connection from the east end of the Route 72 freeway to the west end of the Route 9 freeway opened. The Route 9 designation was extended westward to the current Route 9/72 interchange. Route 372 was extended east along the old Route 72 alignment to Route 3 while Route 3 was extended south along the old Route 72 alignment to Route 66.

=== Freeway relocation ===
In 1961, a freeway section in Berlin was opened from Route 71A to the Berlin Turnpike (US 5 and Route 15). In 1969, Route 72 was rerouted from Berlin into New Britain, leaving the freeway section west of the current Route 9 in Berlin to be reassigned to SR 571. Roundabout The first section of this reroute, from SR 572 to Ellis Street, was opened this year. In 1970, the second section of the rerouting to New Britain was opened from West Main Street to I-84. In 1979, the final part of the rerouting to New Britain was opened, connecting Ellis and West Main Streets.

In 1980, Route 72 in Plainville from the overlap with I-84 to Forestville Avenue was rerouted to the current route. This road, which begins as a freeway and narrows to a divided two-lane road, was constructed in two stages, in 1975 and from 1978 to 1980. With the completion of the freeway from Plainville to Berlin in 1980, Route 72 was formally designated on the freeway and the former surface alignment became Route 372. In 1990, Route 9 took over the eastern end of the Route 72 freeway truncating Route 72 to the current 9/72 interchange and extending Route 372 eastward along the former Route 72.

In 2010, Route 72 was rerouted in Plainville and Bristol onto the new four-lane expressway, a widened Pine Street, and an extended section of Riverside Avenue that crosses the Pequabuck River. The overlap with Route 229 was eliminated, and the old sections along Broad Street, Central St, and East Main Street were decommissioned and control of maintenance returned to the city.

== Junction list ==
Exit numbers were converted from sequential to mile-based in February of 2023.

| County | Location | mi | km | Old exit | New exit | Destinations | Notes |
|---|---|---|---|---|---|---|---|
| Litchfield | Harwinton | 20.05 | 32.27 | | | Route 4 – Burlington, Torrington | Western terminus |
| Litchfield | Terryville | 12.88 | 20.73 | | | US 6 – Terryville, Plymouth, Thomaston | |
| Hartford | Bristol | 9.88 | 15.90 | | | Route 69 – Burlington, Wolcott | |
| Hartford | Bristol | 8.35 | 13.44 | | | Route 229 – Bristol, Southington | |
| Hartford | Bristol | | | Western end of limited-access section | | | |
| Hartford | Plainville | 6.34 | 10.20 | – | – | Route 372 east – Forestville, Plainville Center | At-grade intersection; western terminus of Route 372; access to Forestville via East Main Street; former routing of Route 72 |
| Hartford | Plainville | 5.76 | 9.27 | 1 | 5 | Route 177 (North Washington Street) | Westbound exit and eastbound entrance |
| Hartford | Plainville | 4.32– 4.13 | 6.95– 6.65 | 3-4 2 | 4B-A | I-84 west / Woodford Avenue – Waterbury | Eastbound exit and westbound entrance; signed as exits 4B (Woodford Avenue) and 4A (I-84 west); exit 48 on I-84 |
| Hartford | Plainville | 4.32– 4.13 | 6.95– 6.65 | 3-4 2 | 4B-A | Route 372 (New Britain Avenue) – Plainville | Westbound exit and entrance; former routing of Route 72 |
| Hartford | Plainville/New Britain | 3.72– 3.20 | 5.99– 5.15 | I-84 concurrency | | | |
| Hartford | New Britain | 2.55 | 4.10 | 6 | 3 | I-84 east – Hartford | Westbound exit and eastbound entrance; exit 50 on I-84 |
| Hartford | New Britain | 1.89 | 3.04 | 7 | 2 | Route 372 (Corbin Avenue) | Former routing of Route 72 |
| Hartford | New Britain | 0.95 | 1.53 | 8 | 1D | Downtown New Britain | Eastbound exit and westbound entrance; access via Lake Street |
| Hartford | New Britain | 0.32 | 0.51 | 9 | 1C | Route 71 / Route 174 east to Main Street | Eastbound exit and westbound entrance; Route 174 not signed |
| Hartford | New Britain | 0.00 | 0.00 | – | 1A-B | Route 9 – Newington, Middletown | Eastern terminus; signed as exits 1A (Route 9 north) and 1B (Route 9 south); (exits 37A and 37 on Route 9) |
1.000 mi = 1.609 km; 1.000 km = 0.621 mi: Concurrency terminus; Incomplete access
