= Henry Hooker House =

Historic house in Connecticut, United States

- U.S. National Register of Historic Places
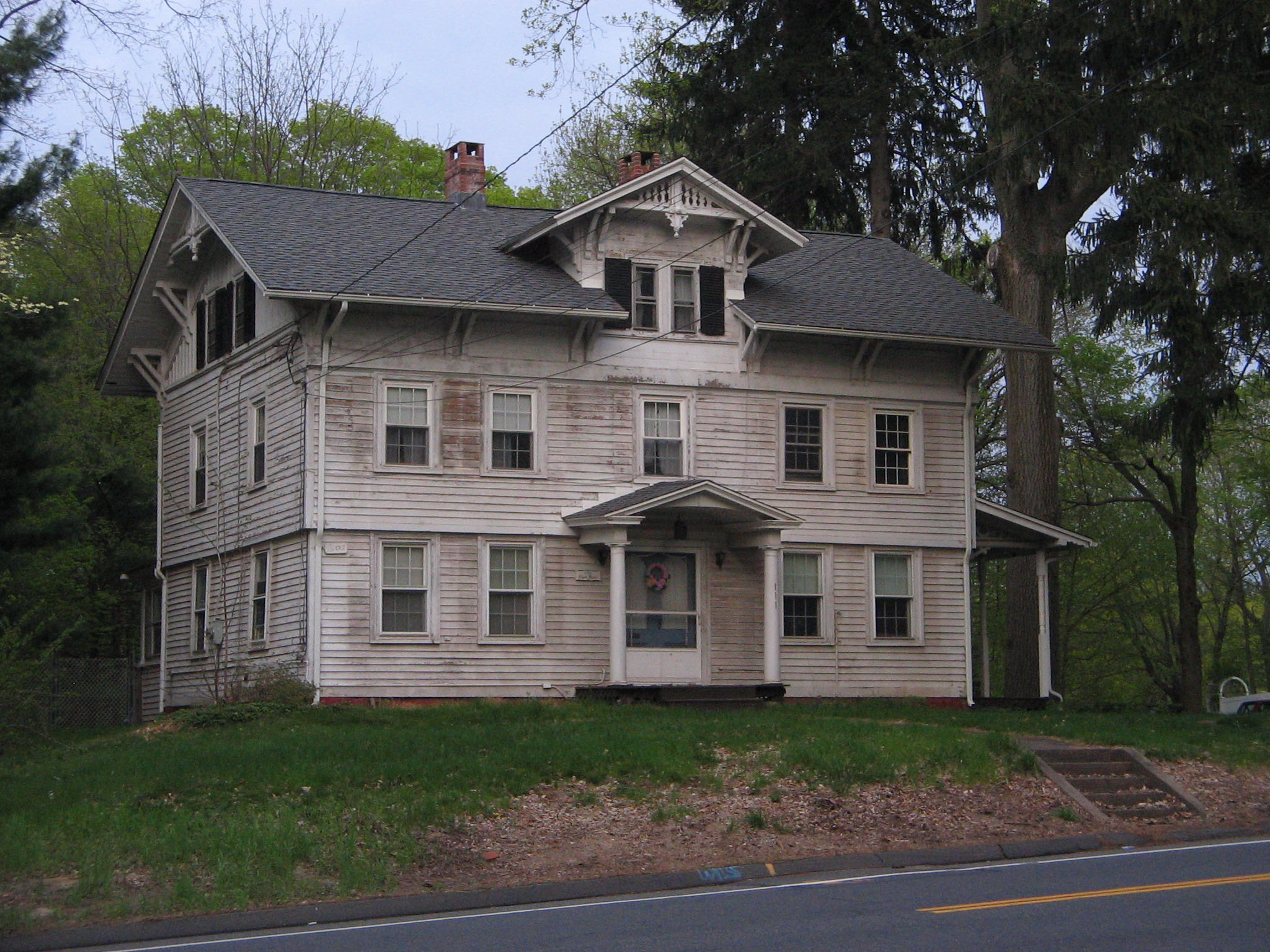
- The Henry Hooker House

- Location within Connecticut Location within the United States
- Location: 111 High Road, Kensington, Connecticut
- Coordinates: 41°38′41″N 72°47′22″W
- Area: less than one acre
- Built: 1769
- NRHP reference No.: 78002867
- Added to NRHP: November 29, 1978

The Henry Hooker House is a historic house at 111 High Road in the Kensington section of Berlin, Connecticut. Built about 1769 by Elijah Hooker and subsequently altered, it exhibits the progressive adaptation of early houses by later generations. It was listed on the National Register of Historic Places in 1978.

== Description ==
The Henry Hooker House is located on the east side of High Road, opposite its junction with Simms Road. It is a 2 1/2-story wood-frame structure, five bays wide, with two narrow interior chimneys. It is covered by a gabled roof with broad eaves that have paired Italianate brackets, and a gabled dormer at the center of the front facade. The front entrance is sheltered by a gabled portico. The house was built c. 1769 by Elijah Hooker, and was last substantially modernized in the mid-19th century. These modifications are clearly evident in an architectural analysis, and include the removal of a large central chimney so that a then-fashionable central hall with broad stairway could be built. These modifications were undertaken by Henry Hooker, who owned a successful carriage making business. The house takes its name from a descendant of Elijah, Henry Hooker, who owned the house and died in Kensington in 1873.

== See also ==
- National Register of Historic Places listings in Hartford County, Connecticut
