= Connecticut Route 217 =

State highway in Middlesex County, Connecticut, US

Route 217
- Map of Middlesex County in southern Connecticut with Route 217 highlighted in red

Route information
- Maintained by CTDOT
- Length: 3.84 mi (6.18 km)
- Existed: 1963–present

Major junctions
- South end: Route 66 in Middlefield
- North end: Route 372 in Cromwell

Location
- Country: United States
- State: Connecticut
- Counties: Middlesex

Highway system
- Connecticut State Highway System; Interstate; US; State; SSR; SR; Scenic
← Route 216	→ Route 218

Route 217 is a state highway in central Connecticut, running from Route 66 in Middlefield to Route 372 in Cromwell. The route serves the Westfield section of the city of Middletown.

== Route description ==
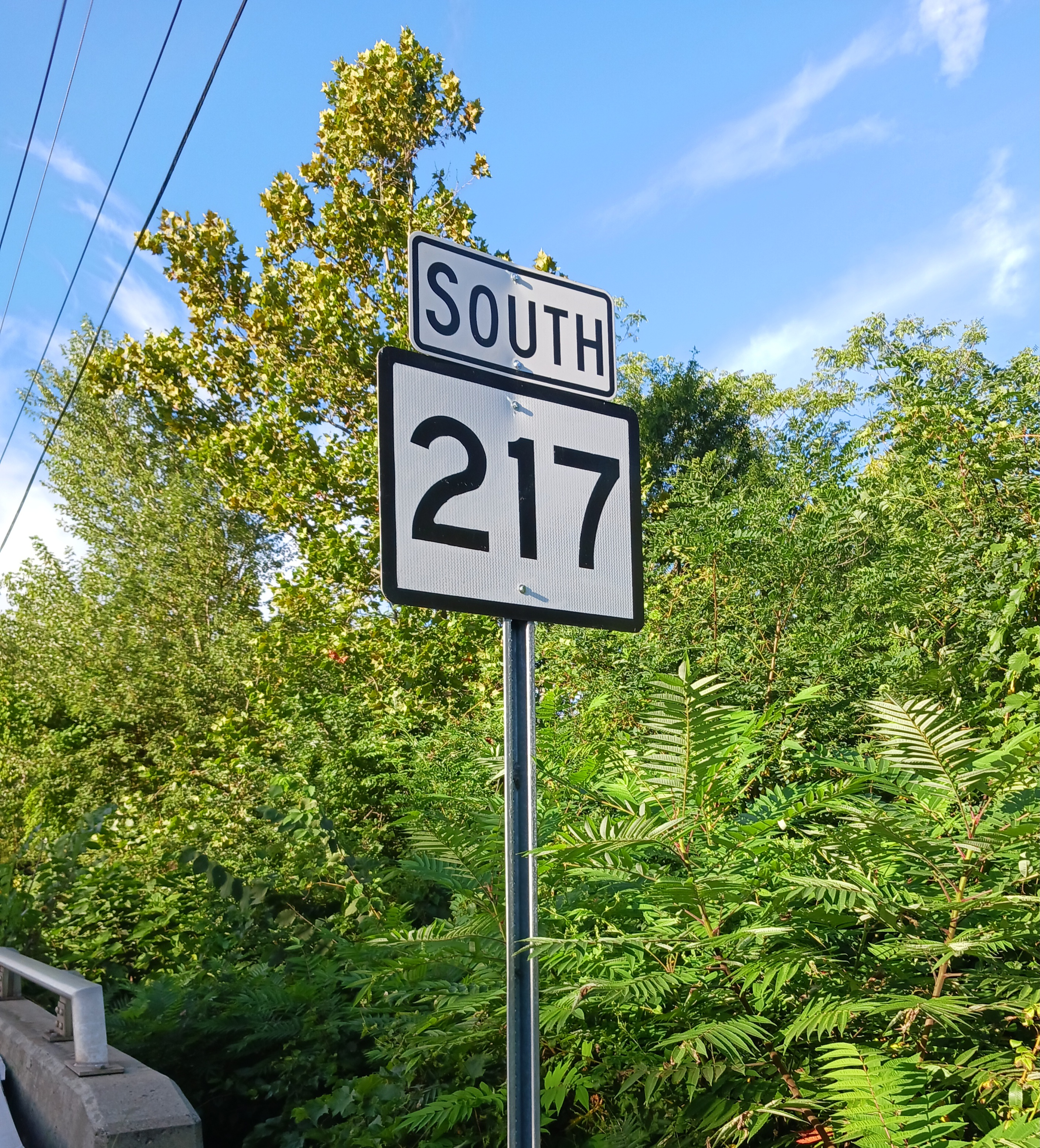

The first southbound reassurance shield coming from Route 372 in Cromwell.

Route 217 begins as Ballfall Road at an intersection with Route 66 in northeastern Middlefield. It heads north, crossing into Middletown after about 160 yards (150 m). In Middletown, it continues north across the western part of the city, intersecting with Country Club Road, which leads to I-91 and several golf courses. North of Country Club Road, the road name changes to East Street and continues north through the Westfield neighborhood of Middletown. It soon crosses the Mattabessett River into the town of Cromwell, where it promptly ends 90 yards (82 m) later at an intersection with Route 372.

== History ==
Modern Route 217 was designated in 1963. Prior to that, an older Route 217 existed since 1935 along Jackson Hill Road between Middlefield center and Route 66. In 1960, the state took over the maintenance of the roads used by modern Route 217 but remained unsigned. As part of the 1962 Route Reclassification Act, Jackson Hill road was turned over to the town. The Route 217 designation was then applied to the Ballfall Road/East Street alignment. Route 217 has had no major changes since.

== Junction list ==
The entire route is in Middlesex County.

Location	mi	km	Destinations	Notes
Middlefield	0.00	0.00	Route 66 – Meriden, Middletown	Southern terminus
Cromwell	3.84	6.18	Route 372 – Berlin, New Britain	Northern terminus
1.000 mi = 1.609 km; 1.000 km = 0.621 mi
