= Matt Carasiti =

American baseball player (born 1991)

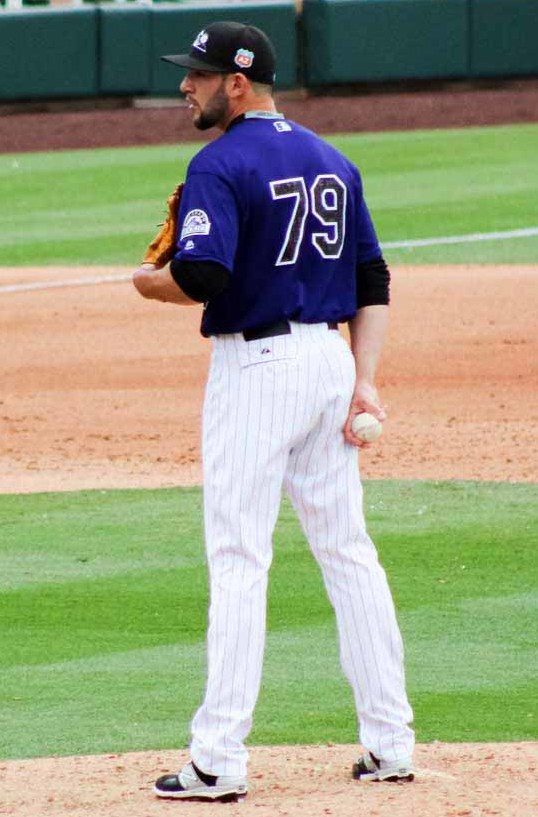
- Carasiti with the Colorado Rockies during spring training in 2016
- Pitcher
- Born: July 23, 1991 (age 35); East Berlin, Connecticut, U.S.
- Batted: Right Threw: Right

Professional debut
- MLB: August 12, 2016, for the Colorado Rockies
- NPB: March 30, 2018, for the Tokyo Yakult Swallows

Last appearance
- MLB: June 7, 2024, for the Colorado Rockies
- NPB: October 9, 2018, for the Tokyo Yakult Swallows

MLB statistics
- Win–loss record: 2–2
- Earned run average: 7.41
- Strikeouts: 50

NPB statistics
- Win–loss record: 7–3
- Earned run average: 4.18
- Strikeouts: 73
- Stats at Baseball Reference

Teams
- Colorado Rockies (2016); Tokyo Yakult Swallows (2018); Seattle Mariners (2019); Colorado Rockies (2023–2024)

Matthew Joseph Carasiti (born July 23, 1991) is an American former professional baseball pitcher. He played in Major League Baseball (MLB) for the Colorado Rockies and Seattle Mariners, and in Nippon Professional Baseball (NPB) for the Tokyo Yakult Swallows. He was drafted by the Rockies in the sixth round of the 2012 Major League Baseball draft.

After ending his playing career in 2024, he became a minor league pitching coach. He is currently the pitching coach for the Binghamton Rumble Ponies.

== Early life ==
Born in New Britain, Connecticut, and raised in East Berlin, Connecticut, Carasiti graduated from Berlin High School, where he was a standout baseball pitcher. Carasiti was originally drafted out of high school by the Texas Rangers in the 36th round (1,084 overall) of the 2009 Major League Baseball draft.

Carasiti declined the offer and accepted a baseball scholarship to St. John's University in Queens, New York. In 2011, he played collegiate summer baseball in the Cape Cod Baseball League for the Yarmouth-Dennis Red Sox. Carasiti helped St. John's win its record seventh Big East Conference baseball tournament with a 7–3 championship game victory against USF on May 27, 2012. Carasiti was named the Tournament Most Outstanding Player, earning the win in two of his team's four games.

== Professional career ==
=== Colorado Rockies ===
On June 5, 2012, Carasiti was drafted by the Colorado Rockies in the sixth round, with the 198th overall selection, of the 2012 Major League Baseball draft.

In 2016, most of which he pitched for the Hartford Yard Goats for whom he was 0–2 with a 2.31 ERA with a league-leading 29 saves, he was named a mid-season Eastern League All Star, a post-season All Star, and an MiLB.com Organization All Star.

Carasiti was called up by the Rockies on August 12, 2016, making his MLB debut the same day pitching 2 innings in relief in the Rockies 10–6 loss to the Philadelphia Phillies. In 19 appearances for the Rockies during his first MLB season, Carasiti struggled to a 9.19 ERA with 17 strikeouts across 15 2/3 innings pitched. On December 2, Colorado non-tendered Carasiti, making him a free agent.

On December 15, 2016, Carasiti re-signed with the Rockies organization on a minor league contract that included an invitation to spring training. In 2017 he was named a mid-season Pacific Coast League All Star.

=== Chicago Cubs ===
On June 26, 2017, Carasiti was traded to the Chicago Cubs in exchange for Zac Rosscup. In 19 appearances for the Triple-A Iowa Cubs, he logged an 0-2 record and 4.66 ERA with 25 strikeouts and 8 saves across 19 1/3 innings pitched. The Cubs selected Carasiti's contract on November 6, to prevent him from reaching minor league free agency. However, he was released on December 1 to pursue a playing opportunity in Japan.

=== Tokyo Yakult Swallows ===
On December 5, 2017, Carasiti signed with the Tokyo Yakult Swallows of Nippon Professional Baseball (NPB). In 32 appearances for the Swallows in 2018, Carasiti compiled a 7–3 record and 4.18 ERA with 73 strikeouts across 94 2/3 innings pitched. He became a free agent following the 2018 season.

=== Chicago Cubs (second stint) ===
On January 2, 2019, Carasiti signed a minor league contract with the Chicago Cubs. With the Triple-A Iowa Cubs, he was 1–1 with one save, a 2.67 ERA, and 23 strikeouts in 16 relief appearances covering 27 innings. Carasiti was released by the Cubs organization on June 7.

=== Seattle Mariners ===
On June 7, 2019, shortly following his release from the Cubs organization, Carasiti signed a minor league contract with the Seattle Mariners. On June 23, his contract was selected. With the Mariners, he was 0–1 with a 4.66 ERA in 9 2/3 innings in which he struck out 10 batters in 11 games (5 starts). With the Triple-A Tacoma Rainiers of the Pacific Coast League, he was 1–0 with a 4.96 ERA in 15 relief appearances in which he pitched 16 1/3 innings and struck out 17 batters. On September 8, he was outrighted off the 40-man roster. Carasiti elected free agency following the season on November 4.

=== San Francisco Giants ===
On January 5, 2020, the San Francisco Giants signed Carasiti to a minor league contract that included an invitation to spring training. Carasiti was released by the Giants in March 2020 after undergoing Tommy John surgery.

=== Boston Red Sox ===
On January 26, 2021, Carasiti signed a minor league contract with the Boston Red Sox organization that included an invitation to spring training. He was assigned to the Triple-A Worcester Red Sox, and began the season on the injured list. Carasiti did not appear in a game in 2021 and became a free agent following the season.

=== San Francisco Giants (second stint) ===
On January 27, 2022, Carasiti signed a minor league contract with the San Francisco Giants. He was released on July 18.

=== Long Island Ducks ===
On August 13, 2022, Carasiti signed with the Long Island Ducks of the Atlantic League of Professional Baseball. In 9 games of relief he went 1–1 with a 1.59 ERA and 14 strikeouts across 11 1/3 innings pitched.

=== Colorado Rockies (second stint) ===
On December 21, 2022, Carasiti signed a minor league deal with the Colorado Rockies. He was assigned to the Triple-A Albuquerque Isotopes to begin the 2023 season, making 16 appearances with a 4.00 ERA and 18 strikeouts in 18 innings of work. On May 21, the Rockies selected Carasiti's contract to the active roster. In 16 games for the Rockies, Carasiti struggled to a 6.29 ERA with 16 strikeouts and one save in 24 1/3 innings pitched. On October 13, he was removed from the 40-man roster and sent outright to Triple-A Albuquerque. However, Carasiti subsequently rejected the assignment and elected free agency.

On January 29, 2024, Carasiti re-signed with the Rockies on a minor league contract. In 20 games for Albuquerque, he had a 5.91 ERA with 26 strikeouts and 6 saves across 21 1/3 innings. On May 24, the Rockies selected Carasiti's contract, adding him to their active roster. In 7 games for Colorado, he struggled to a 10.38 ERA with 7 strikeouts across 8 2/3 innings pitched. On June 8, Carasiti was designated for assignment by the Rockies. He elected free agency after clearing waivers on June 10.

=== Atlanta Braves ===
On June 14, 2024, Carasiti signed a minor league contract with the Atlanta Braves. In 11 appearances for the Triple-A Gwinnett Stripers, he compiled a 3.46 ERA with 19 strikeouts across 13 innings pitched. Carasiti was released by the Braves organization on August 1.

== Coaching career ==
=== Seattle Mariners organization ===
On January 15, 2025, the Seattle Mariners hired Carasiti to serve as the pitching coach for their High-A affiliate, the Everett AquaSox.

=== New York Mets organization ===
On January 22, 2026, Carasiti was announced as the pitching coach for the Binghamton Rumble Ponies, the Double-A affiliate of the New York Mets.
