= Nelson Augustus Moore =

American painter and photographer (1824–1902)

- Evening, Lake George, c. 1893, New Britain Museum of American Art
- Born: August 2, 1824; Connecticut, U.S.
- Died: November 30, 1902 (aged 78); Kensington, Connecticut, U.S.
- Known for: Landscape painting; photography
- Movement: Hudson River School
- Spouse: Ann Maria Pickett
- Children: 4, including Edwin Augustus Moore

Nelson Augustus Moore (August 2, 1824 – November 30, 1902) was an American landscape painter and photographer associated with the Hudson River School. Raised in Kensington, Connecticut, he studied art in New York City before establishing a photographic business in central Connecticut and Hartford. His photographs documented subjects including the Charter Oak, Civil War-era Hartford, and some of the last surviving veterans of the American Revolutionary War.

During the 1860s Moore made landscape painting his main occupation. His subjects included rural Connecticut and the Lake George region. He exhibited at the National Academy of Design from 1863 to 1876 and designed the Kensington Soldier's Monument in Connecticut.

== Early life and training ==
Moore was born on August 2, 1824, to Roswell Moore and Lucy Allen Moore. He was their eldest child. His family moved to Kensington in 1830, where his father operated mills and participated in the family's hydraulic-cement business.

In 1842 Moore held a light for Milo Hotchkiss as he painted a portrait of a child who had died in an accident. Moore then obtained painting materials and began studying on his own. In 1845 he worked as a railway station agent in Berlin, Connecticut using space in the depot's attic as a studio.

In 1847 Moore moved to New York City. He studied drawing from casts with Thomas Seir Cummings and later portrait painting with Daniel Huntington By 1850 he had returned to Connecticut, where he taught drawing at the New Britain Normal School and increasingly concentrated on landscape painting.

== Photography ==
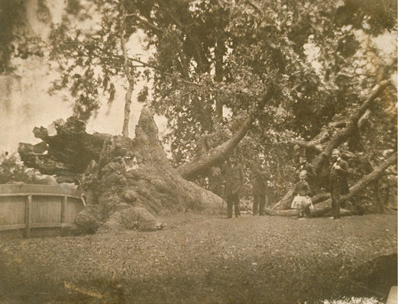
The fallen Charter Oak, photographed on August 21, 1856

Moore acquired a daguerreotype business in New Britain and moved the operation to Hartford in 1854, opening a studio on Main Street. His younger brother Roswell Allen Moore later joined the business, which traded as N. A. & R. A. Moore. Their studio made portraits of Civil War soldiers in tintype and carte-de-visite formats, using a painted military-camp backdrop. The Library of Congress holds a hand-colored tintype of an unidentified soldier of the 16th Connecticut Infantry, credited to N. A. & R. A. Moore and dated between 1862 and 1865.

Moore photographed the Charter Oak while concern was growing about the tree's condition in 1855 and again after it fell during a storm on August 21, 1856. The brothers also photographed a balloon ascension in Hartford's Bushnell Park in 1862 and the aftermath of the 1864 fire at the Colt firearms factory.

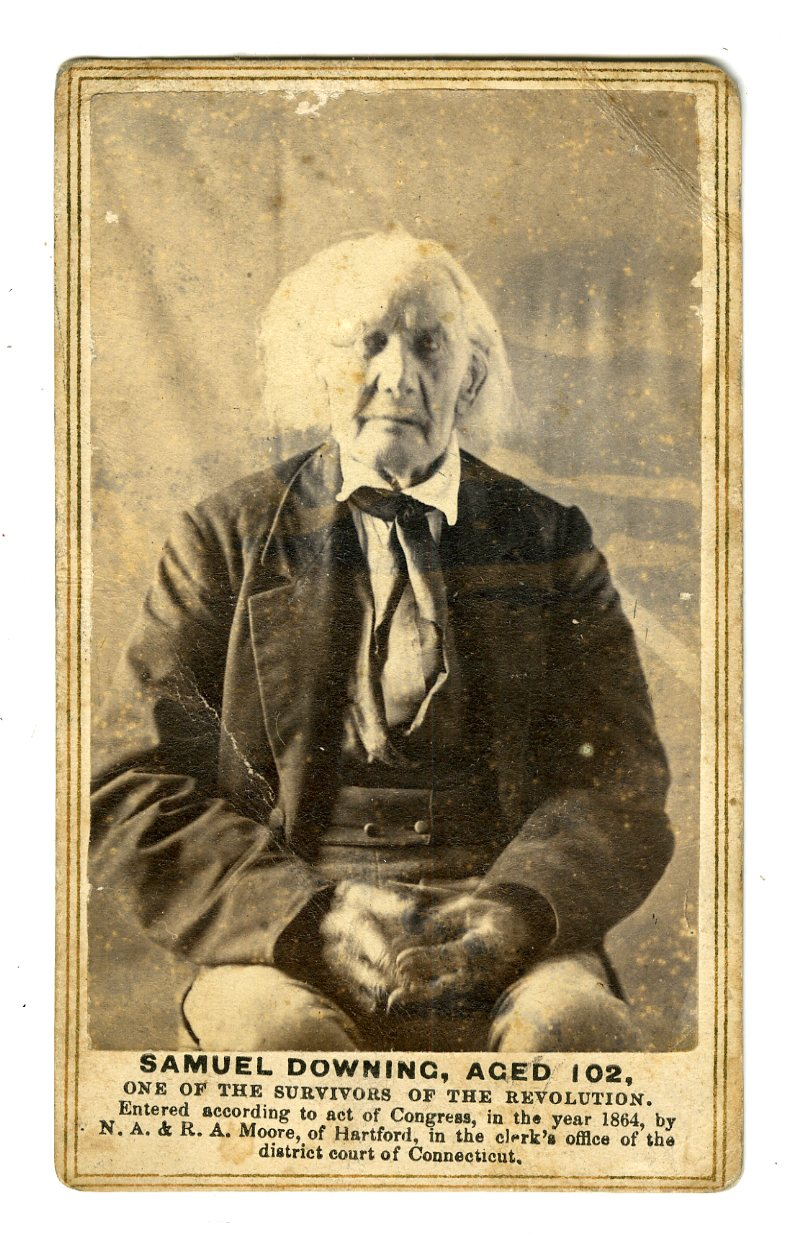
Samuel Downing, one of the Revolutionary War veterans photographed by Moore in 1864

In 1864 N. A. & R. A. Moore published The Last Men of the Revolution, illustrated with photographs of surviving veterans of the Revolutionary War.

During the 1860s Moore left the photography business to his brother and returned to painting as his main occupation. (Note: Knoble dates the sale of Moore's share of the business to 1862; Vose Galleries places his departure around 1864.)

== Painting and design ==
Forest Scene (Portaging), 1871, New Britain Museum of American Art

Moore's landscapes are associated with the Hudson River School. Writing in 1879, French described pastoral scenes as a specialty and noted Moore's paintings of snow and seasonal foliage. In a 2014 museum essay, collectors Todd and Marenda Stitzer described his approach as realist, with small-scale compositions and careful delineation of individual forms.

In notes reproduced in the catalog of his 1934 Macbeth Gallery exhibition, Moore recommended careful finish and advised against strong contrasts of light and shade. He also advocated freely handled brushwork, arguing that a decisive touch added to a painting's merits.

Moore began visiting Lake George during the 1860s and returned over the following 25 summers. He painted its lakeside scenery and made pictures for summer residents who commissioned particular views. He exhibited at the National Academy of Design from 1863 through 1876, although he never became an Academician. On November 29, 1869, he opened a one-man exhibition of 20 paintings at the New Britain Institute, the parent organization of the New Britain Museum of American Art.

In addition to Connecticut and Lake George, Moore painted in Rhode Island, on the North Shore of Massachusetts, at Lake Mohonk in New York, in Minnesota, and in St. Augustine, Florida.

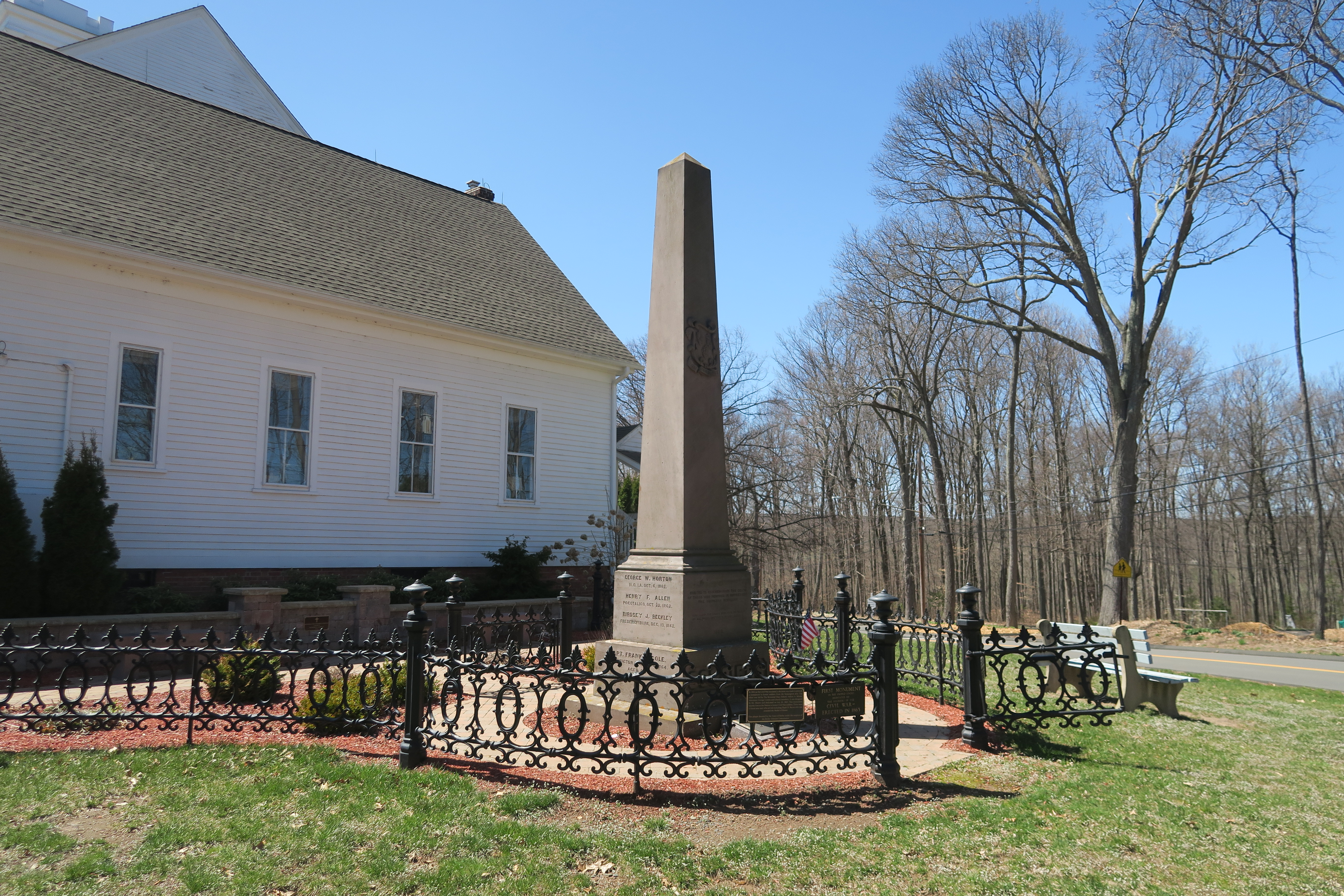
The Kensington Soldier's Monument, designed by Moore and dedicated in 1863

He designed the Kensington Soldier's Monument, a brownstone obelisk erected in 1863 to commemorate local Union dead. The monument was dedicated on July 28, 1863, and is listed on the National Register of Historic Places.

== Personal life and later career ==
Moore married Ann Maria Pickett of Morris, Connecticut, in 1853. They had four children. Their son Edwin Augustus Moore became an animal and figure painter, and their daughter Ellen Maria Moore became a painter of portrait miniatures.

In Kensington, Moore built a stone-and-cement house on High Road known as "Stonehouse", using materials connected with his family's cement business.

In 1878 Moore and his family moved to Hartford, where he kept a studio in the Cheney Building and lived on Sigourney Street. They returned to Kensington in 1884 after Moore held a sale of roughly 90 paintings in Hartford. During the 1890s he also maintained a studio for a period in New York City.

Moore died at his home in Kensington on November 30, 1902.

== Exhibitions and collections ==
The Macbeth Gallery in New York held an exhibition of 28 paintings by Moore from October 1 to 15, 1934. The New Britain Museum of American Art presented a landscape exhibition in 1938, followed by exhibitions in 1980 and 2014. Vose Galleries in Boston organized exhibitions in 1966, 1971, and 1990–91.

Works by Moore are held by the New Britain Museum of American Art, the Wadsworth Atheneum, the William Benton Museum of Art, the Mattatuck Museum, and the Connecticut Museum of Culture and History, among other institutions. The Connecticut Museum also preserves paintings, photographs, letters, diaries, and objects associated with Moore, including his easel and the umbrella he used while sketching outdoors.
