= Lord Day & Lord =

Former American law firm (1845–1994)

- Headquarters: New York City
- No. of attorneys: 125
- Major practice areas: General practice
- Date founded: 1845
- Founder: Daniel Lord; Daniel DeForest Lord; Henry Day
- Company type: Defunct
- Dissolved: 1994

Lord Day & Lord was a large American blue-chip law firm in New York City. It was established in 1845 by Daniel Lord, his son Daniel DeForest Lord, and his son-in-law Henry Day.

== History ==
The firm had retained the same name until 1988 when it merged with the smaller firm Barrett Smith Simon & Armstrong to become Lord Day & Lord, Barrett Smith. Barrett Smith was a firm of 65 attorneys (which then qualified as mid-sized) that focused on white collar criminal defense litigation, commodities and aircraft leasing. It brought major clients such as the Coffee, Sugar and Cocoa Exchange, Merrill Lynch, and British Airways. Lord Day's traditional clients were the American Stock Exchange, Cunard Line, The New York Times, Chemical Bank and generations of the Astor family via the Astor Estate. The combined firm maintained offices in New York City, Washington, D.C., and London. Prior to the consummation of the merger, however, rival New York firm Chadbourne & Parke lured away the entire corporate tax team from Barrett Smith, approximately 30 attorneys. Similarly, the 20-strong flagship white collar group of legacy Barrett Smith defected to Kirkpatrick & Lockhart shortly after the merger.

== Dissolution ==
The firm unraveled in October 1994 amid mounting partner defections and discord. At the time of dissolution, it employed 125 lawyers, which was a decrease of 30% from the year prior. About 50 attorneys joined the New York office of the Philadelphia-based law firm Morgan, Lewis & Bockius. The firm was buffeted by partner departures and declining revenues while still holding the large commercial office rent of $6 million per year for its offices at 1675 Broadway. The firm was also involved in notable litigation involving a partnership agreement's impermissible restriction on the practice of law.

== Notable alumni ==
- Louis M. Loeb, the former general counsel to The New York Times for twenty years.
- James Goodale, the former general counsel and vice chairman of The New York Times.
- Herbert Brownell Jr., the Attorney General of the United States in President Dwight D. Eisenhower's cabinet from 1953 to 1957.
- Todd Stitzer, CEO of Cadbury Schweppes.
- Gordon Davis, the former New York City Parks Commissioner and the first African American to become a partner in a major New York corporate law firm.
