= Daniel Lord =

American attorney

For the Catholic priest and writer, see Daniel A. Lord

Daniel Lord (September 23, 1795 – March 4, 1868) was a New York City attorney. His firm was eventually joined by his son-in-law Henry Day and son Daniel Lord Jr. to form Lord Day & Lord. John Jacob Astor was among Lord's clients.

== Early life ==
Lord was born in Stonington, Connecticut September 23, 1795. He was a son of Phebe (née Crary) Lord (1773–1847) and Dr. Daniel Lord (1767–1845). His father, a doctor, moved the family to New York City while Lord was a toddler. He graduated from Yale College in 1814.

== Career ==
Lord was a legal contemporary of Chief Justices Thomas J. Oakley and William Alexander Duer, Chancellors Reuben H. Walworth and James Kent, and Spencer, Wood, Ogden Hoffman, Stevens, Hill, and Bradford.

In 1818, Lord opened his firm as a solo practitioner. By 1848, he was joined by his son-in-law, Henry Day, and son, Daniel Lord Jr., to form Lord, Day & Lord. John Jacob Astor was among Lord's clients. The firm operated until October 1994.

In 1851 he delivered Yale University on Phi Beta Kappa address.

== Personal life ==
On May 16, 1818, Lord was married to Susan DeForest (1799–1879), a daughter of Lockwood DeForest and Mehitabel (née Wheeler) DeForest. Together, they were the parents of:

- Daniel DeForest Lord (1819–1894), who married Mary Howard Butler (1823–1880), a daughter of Attorney General Benjamin Franklin Butler, in 1844. After Mary's death, he married Elizabeth Riley.
- John Crary Lord (1821–1873), who married Margaret Hawley (1825–1909), a daughter of Gideon Hawley, in 1846.
- Phoebe Lucretia Lord (1823–1890), who married Henry Day in 1849.
- James Couper Lord (1827–1869), who married Margaretta Hunter Brown (1829–1898), a daughter of banker James Brown of Brown Bros. & Co., in 1852.
- Sarah Lord (b. 1829), who married Henry C. Howells in 1887.
- Edward Crary Lord (1831–1892), who married Emily Maria Livingston (1842–1892), a daughter of Gerard William Livingston (grandson of Robert Livingston, 3rd Lord of Livingston Manor), in 1864.
- George DeForest Lord (1833–1892), a lawyer who married Frances Theodora Shelton, in 1877.

Lord died at his home in New York on March 4, 1868. His death in 1868 was attributed to "paralysis". After a funeral held at Rev. Dr. Spring's Church at 35th Street and Fifth Avenue, he was buried at the New York Marble Cemetery on Second Avenue in New York.
