= Connecticut Route 229 =

State highway in Hartford County, Connecticut, US

Route 229
- Map of Hartford County in northern Connecticut with Route 229 highlighted in red

Route information
- Maintained by CTDOT
- Length: 5.94 mi (9.56 km)
- Existed: 1963–present

Major junctions
- South end: I-84 in Southington
- North end: US 6 in Bristol

Location
- Country: United States
- State: Connecticut
- Counties: Hartford

Highway system
- Connecticut State Highway System; Interstate; US; State; SSR; SR; Scenic
← Route 222	→ Route 234

Route 229 is a state highway in the western Greater Hartford area of the U.S. state of Connecticut. It runs north-south from Interstate 84 in Southington to U.S. Route 6 in Bristol. Along the way, Route 72 intersects the Forestville section of Bristol.

== Route description ==
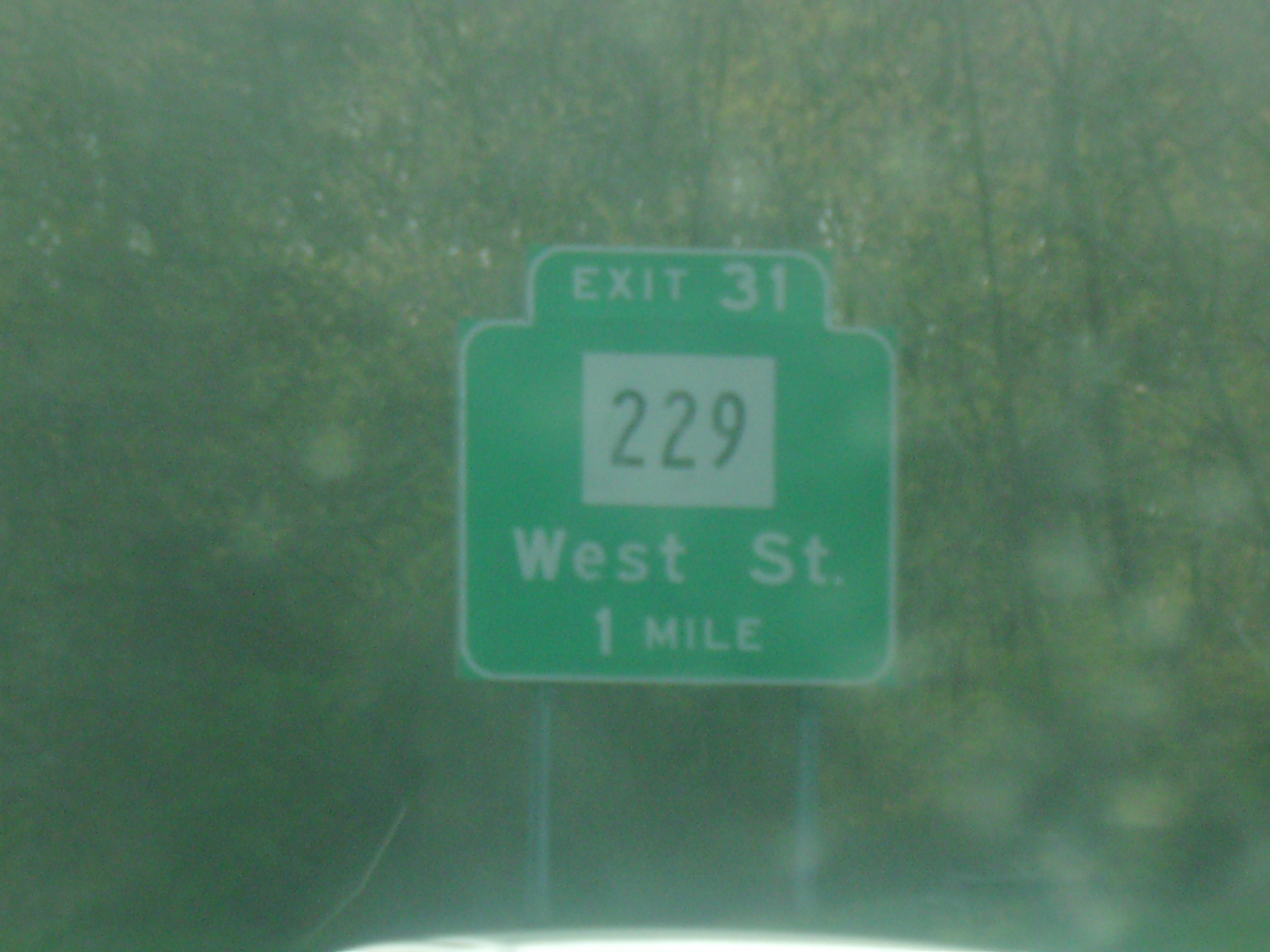
Signage for the route on Interstate 84

Route 229 nominally begins at the end of the eastbound off-ramp of I-84 in western Southington, heading northward along West Street. State maintenance and the official southern end of Route 229 begins about 0.01-mile (0.016 km) south of the off-ramp. West Street is four lanes wide in the vicinity of the I-84 interchange, then becomes a three lane (two lanes northbound, one lane southbound) urban arterial as it heads north. Just south of the Bristol town line, Route 229 shifts to Middle Street and becomes four lanes wide.

Route 229 continues into Bristol, passing in front of the headquarters of ESPN and the access road to the Lake Compounce theme park. After crossing the Pequabuck River, it intersects Route 72. After the intersection, the road becomes King Street and narrows to 2 lanes. It continues north for another 1.5 miles (2.4 km), passing in front of De Witt Page Park until it reaches US 6 (Farmington Avenue) in the Edgewood section of the city.

== History ==
Route 229 was originally just a series of town roads before the late 1950s. In anticipation of increased traffic due to the construction of I-84, Southington lobbied for state maintenance of a section of West Street. This was accepted into the state highway system on October 14, 1959. Several years later, Bristol also applied to have Middle Street and King Street turned over to the state in anticipation of through traffic between I-84 and Downtown Bristol. The Highway Department accepted those streets into the state highway system on August 20, 1962. Route 229 was formally designated in 1963 due to the Route Reclassification Act.

In the 1970s, several plans for spot improvements on Route 229 were announced by the Department of Transportation. The original plan was to reconstruct Route 229 from I-84 to the Bristol town line and widen it to four lanes. However, the plan had later changed to two lanes, with 8-foot (2.4 m) shoulders.

== Junction list ==
The entire route is in Hartford County.

Location	mi	km	Destinations	Notes
Southington	0.00	0.00	I-84 – Hartford, Waterbury	Southern terminus; exit 44 on I-84
Bristol	4.41	7.10	Route 72 – Plainville, Bristol Center	
Bristol	5.94	9.56	US 6 – Farmington, Plymouth	Northern terminus
1.000 mi = 1.609 km; 1.000 km = 0.621 mi
