= Todd Stitzer =

American businessman (born 1952)

- Born: March 10, 1952 (age 74); United States
- Education: Harvard University and Columbia Law School
- Occupation: Business executive
- Known for: Was the chief executive officer of Cadbury plc
- Children: 2

H. Todd Stitzer (born 10 March 1952) is an American-British business executive who served as the chief executive officer of Cadbury plc from 2003 to 2010.

== Early life ==
Stitzer was born in the United States, the son of a YMCA director and a nurse, and is a naturalised British citizen. He was educated at Ridgewood High School, New Jersey, Springfield College, Massachusetts. He then obtained a B.A. from Harvard University and a J.D. from Columbia Law School.

== Career ==
He joined New York law firm, Lord Day & Lord, in 1973 as an associate attorney.

In 1983, joined Cadbury North America as Assistant General Counsel, later becoming marketing chief for US beverages.

He moved to London in 1991 as Group Development Director and then back to the United States in 1993 as vice-president of Marketing and Strategic Planning and then Chief Operating Officer for Cadbury Beverages, North America. He was president and chief executive officer of Dr Pepper/Seven Up from 1997 to 2000 and Chief Strategy Officer from 2000 to 2003.

He joined the board of Cadbury plc in 2000 and in 2003, was appointed chief executive officer. On 2 February 2010, Kraft Foods Inc. successfully completed the acquisition of Cadbury which was originally a hostile takeover, the next day Stitzer along with Cadbury Chairman Roger Carr announced their resignations.

== Personal life ==
Stitzer has two children, a son and a daughter, and homes in Connecticut in the US and Surrey in the UK. He and his wife are collectors of works by nineteenth-century Connecticut painter Nelson Augustus Moore.
