= Connecticut Route 177 =

State highway in Hartford County, Connecticut, US

Route 177
- Map of Hartford County in northern Connecticut with Route 177 highlighted in red

Route information
- Maintained by CTDOT
- Length: 12.57 mi (20.23 km)
- Existed: 1932–present

Major junctions
- South end: Route 10 in Plainville
- Route 72 in Plainville; Route 4 in Unionville
- North end: US 44 / US 202 in Canton

Location
- Country: United States
- State: Connecticut
- Counties: Hartford

Highway system
- Connecticut State Highway System; Interstate; US; State; SSR; SR; Scenic
← Route 176	→ Route 178

Route 177 is a state highway in central Connecticut, running from Plainville to Canton.

== Route description ==
Route 177 begins as Town Line Road at an intersection with Route 10 in Plainville, just north of the Southington town line. It heads west for 0.2 miles (0.32 km) then turns north onto South Washington Street. From this intersection, South Washington Street continues one way southbound into Southington as Birch Street (SR 532), and ends at Route 10. Route 177 continues north along South Washington Street to the town center of Plainville, where it intersects with Route 372 and becomes North Washington Street. After crossing the Pequabuck River, it soon has a junction with Route 72, connecting with it via a partial interchange allowing access to and from points east. North of the intersection, the road becomes Unionville Avenue as it continues north into the town of Farmington.

In Farmington, the road becomes Plainville Avenue and continues north across the southwestern part of town, passing Tunxis Community College before intersecting with U.S. Route 6 about 0.6 miles (0.97 km) north of the town line. Route 177 soon enters the Unionville section of Farmington, where the road becomes South Main Street. After crossing the Farmington River into the center of Unionville, it intersects Route 4. North of here, Route 177 continues as Lovely Street. Route 177 runs about 3.5 miles (5.6 km) in the western portion of the town of Avon then enters the town of Canton. The road ends 0.7 miles (1.1 km) later at an intersection with US 44 and US 202 near Bond Pond in Canton center.

== History ==
The route from Plainville to Unionville was designated in 1922 as State Highway 160, while that from Unionville to Canton center was known as State Highway 320. In the 1932 state highway renumbering, these two state highways were combined into a single route, Route 177. Similar to the older highways it replaced, Route 177 originally ran from Route 372 (then Route 72) in Plainville to its current northern terminus at US 44 in Canton. In 1962, it was extended south to its current southern terminus.

== Junction list ==
The entire route is in Hartford County.

Location	mi	km	Destinations	Notes
Plainville	0.00	0.00	Route 10 – Southington, Farmington	Southern terminus
Plainville	0.23	0.37	Birch Street (SR 532 south)	
Plainville	1.56	2.51	Route 372 – Forestville, New Britain	
Plainville	2.09	3.36	Route 72 east – New Britain	Exit 5 on Route 72
Farmington	4.14	6.66	US 6 – Bristol, Hartford	
Farmington	7.87	12.67	Route 4 – West Hartford, Burlington	
Canton	12.57	20.23	US 44 / US 202 – Avon, Winsted, Torrington	Northern terminus
1.000 mi = 1.609 km; 1.000 km = 0.621 mi
