= Connecticut Route 372 =

State highway in Hartford and Middlesex counties in Connecticut, US

Route 372

- Map of central Connecticut with Route 372 highlighted in red

Route information
- Maintained by CTDOT
- Length: 14.95 mi (24.06 km)
- Existed: 1978–present

Major junctions
- West end: Route 72 / East Main Street in Plainville
- I-84 in New Britain; US 5 / Route 15 / Berlin Turnpike / Route 9 in Berlin; I-91 in Cromwell; Route 9 in Cromwell
- East end: Route 99 in Cromwell

Location
- Country: United States
- State: Connecticut
- Counties: Hartford, Middlesex

Highway system
- Connecticut State Highway System; Interstate; US; State; SSR; SR; Scenic
← Route 364	→ I-384

Route 372 is a 14.95-mile (24.06 km) state highway in Hartford and Middlesex counties in central Connecticut, United States, running from Plainville to Cromwell, and serving to communicate between the numerous freeways in the area. The section of Route 372 from Route 10 in Plainville to the Plainville-New Britain town line is designated the Joseph E. Tinty Memorial Highway. The section of Route 372 from the interchange with Route 72 in New Britain to the intersection with Route 71A and SR 571 in Berlin is designated the Polish Legion of American Veterans Memorial Highway.

== Route description ==
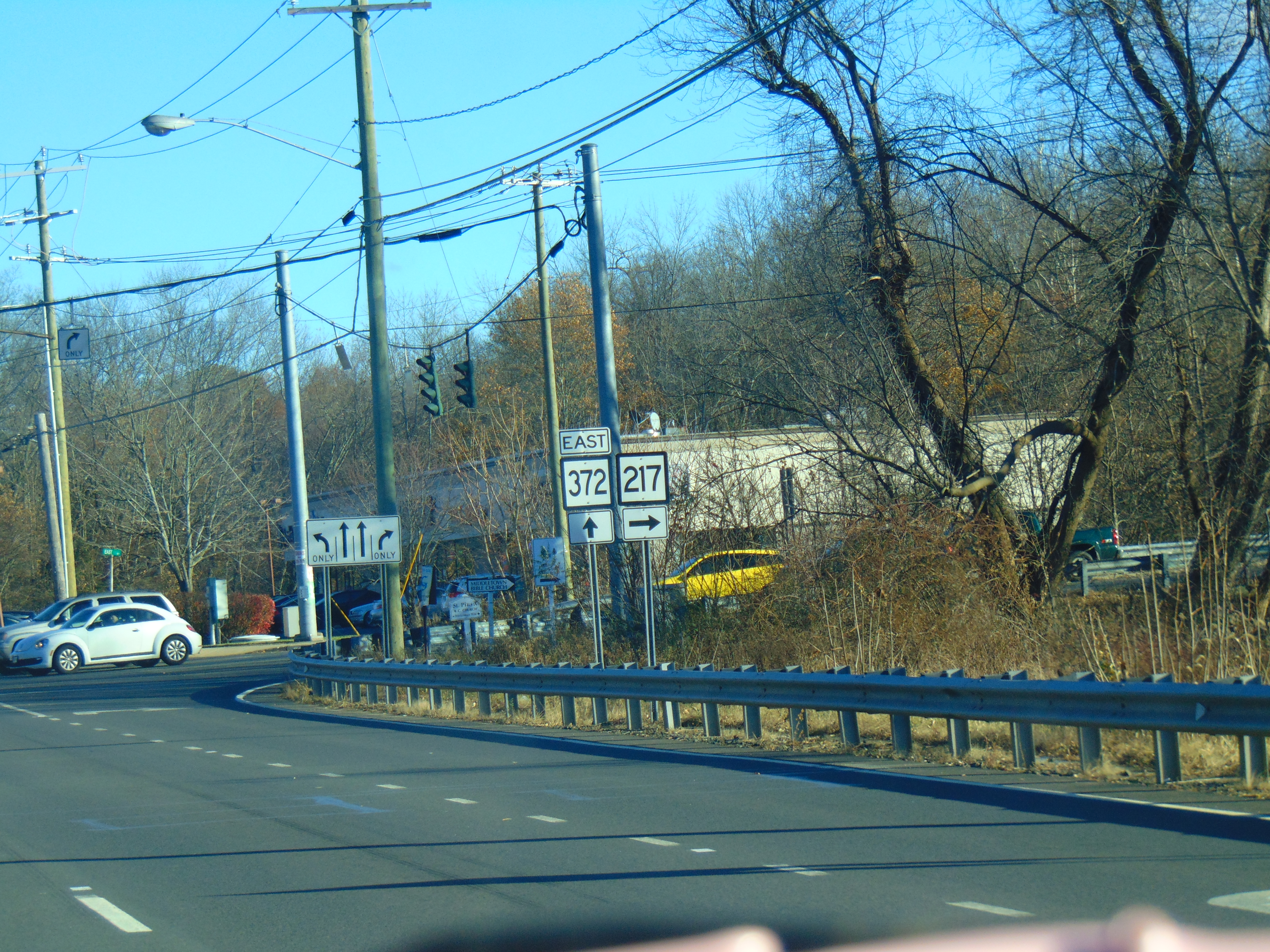
Route 372 intersecting Route 217 in Cromwell, November 2017

Route 372 begins just west of an intersection with Route 72 at the Bristol–Plainville town line, and heads generally east. It intersects Route 177, then passes through the town center. It has a junction with Route 10 just before passing under Route 72 with eastbound access provided by Hooker Street (SR 511). At the New Britain, it passes under I-84 without an interchange, then turns southeast to intersect Route 72 again at Exit 7. It continues southeast, and intersects SR 571 at the Berlin town line. Eastbound traffic continues on one-way SR 918 to cross Route 71A, while westbound traffic briefly overlaps with Route 71A through the intersection. In the Kensington section of town, it intersects Route 71, and passes the Berlin Amtrak station. Just north of Berlin Center, it intersects Route 9 at Exit 22, the US 5/Route 15 concurrency (the Berlin Turnpike), and Route 9 again at Exit 21 in rapid succession. It continues east through East Berlin and crosses the Mattabesset River into Cromwell. In Cromwell, it continues easterly along the Mattabesset River, intersecting I-91 at Exit 21. It then widens to 4 lanes, and intersects the northern end of Route 217. Farther east, it crosses Route 3 before meeting Route 9 once again at Exit 19. It then turns southeast to at an intersection with Route 99 at the Cromwell town center.

== History ==
Route 72 was established in the 1932 state highway renumbering between Route 66 in Middletown and Route 10 Plainville. By the beginning of 1963, after the implementation of the 1962 Route Reclassification Act, Route 72 was extended west and north through Bristol and Plymouth to Route 4 in Harwinton. A freeway along the Route 72 corridor between Berlin (incorporating sections of what is now Route 9) and Plainville was built beginning in the late 1950s and opened in stages beginning in 1961. By late 1980, the Route 72 freeway was fully open between the Berlin Turnpike and the current west end of the freeway in Plainville.

With the extension of the Route 72 freeway in New Britain in 1978 and in Plainville in 1980, Route 372 was designated along the former surface route of Route 72. In 1980, Route 372 ran from the end of the Route 72 freeway in Plainville to Exit 24 of Route 9 in Berlin, including the Willow Brook Connector (now State Road 571). In 1990, a freeway link between I-91 and the east end of the Route 72 freeway was completed. This resulted in the Route 9 designation being extended westward to Exit 28, Route 72 being truncated in the east to end at Route 9, the Willow Brook Connector being redesignated as SR 571, and Route 372 being rerouted and extended eastward along the former Route 72 in Berlin and Cromwell to Route 3 (Route 3 was extended south along old Route 72 to Middletown at the same time). Additionally, Route 372 continued east to Route 99 along a former unsigned state road.

== Junction list ==
County	Location	mi	km	Destinations	Notes
Hartford	Bristol–Plainville line	0.00	0.00	East Main Street – Forestville	Continuation west; former Route 72
Hartford	Plainville	0.12	0.19	Route 72 – Bristol, New Britain	
Hartford	Plainville	0.71	1.14	Route 177 – Unionville, Southington	
Hartford	Plainville	1.67	2.69	Route 10 – Southington, Farmington	
Hartford	Plainville	1.82	2.93	Route 72 east to I-84 – New Britain, Hartford, Waterbury	Access via Hooker Street
Hartford	Plainville	2.40	3.86	Route 72 west – Bristol	Exit 4 on Route 72 west
Hartford	Plainville	2.94	4.73	I-84 east / Route 72 east – Hartford, New Britain	Access via SR 536
Hartford	New Britain	4.56	7.34	Route 72 to I-84 / Route 9 – Bristol, Newington, Middletown	Exit 2 on Route 72
Hartford	Berlin	6.14– 6.35	9.88– 10.22	Route 71A to Route 9 south / Route 71 – Middletown, Meriden, New Britain	Access to Route 9/Route 71 via SR 571
Hartford	Berlin	7.63	12.28	Route 71 – Meriden, New Britain	
Hartford	Berlin	9.15– 9.34	14.73– 15.03	US 5 / Route 15 (Berlin Turnpike) / Route 9 / Worthington Ridge Road (SR 572 north) – Meriden, Middletown, New Britain, Newington, Hartford	Exit 32 on Route 9
Hartford	Berlin	9.84	15.84	Route 9 south – Middletown	Exit 31 on Route 9 north
Middlesex	Cromwell	11.80	18.99	I-91 – New Haven, Hartford	Exit 25 on I-91
Middlesex	Cromwell	12.34	19.86	Route 217 south – Westfield, Middlefield	Northern terminus of Route 217
Middlesex	Cromwell	13.05	21.00	To Route 3 south – Middletown	Access via SR 524
Middlesex	Cromwell	13.30	21.40	Route 3 – Middletown, Rocky Hill	
Middlesex	Cromwell	13.42	21.60	Route 9 – Middletown, New Britain	Exit 27 on Route 9
Middlesex	Cromwell	15.12	24.33	Route 99 – Middletown, Rocky Hill	Eastern terminus; former Route 9
1.000 mi = 1.609 km; 1.000 km = 0.621 mi

== See also ==
- List of state highways in Connecticut
