= Catherine M. McGee Middle School =

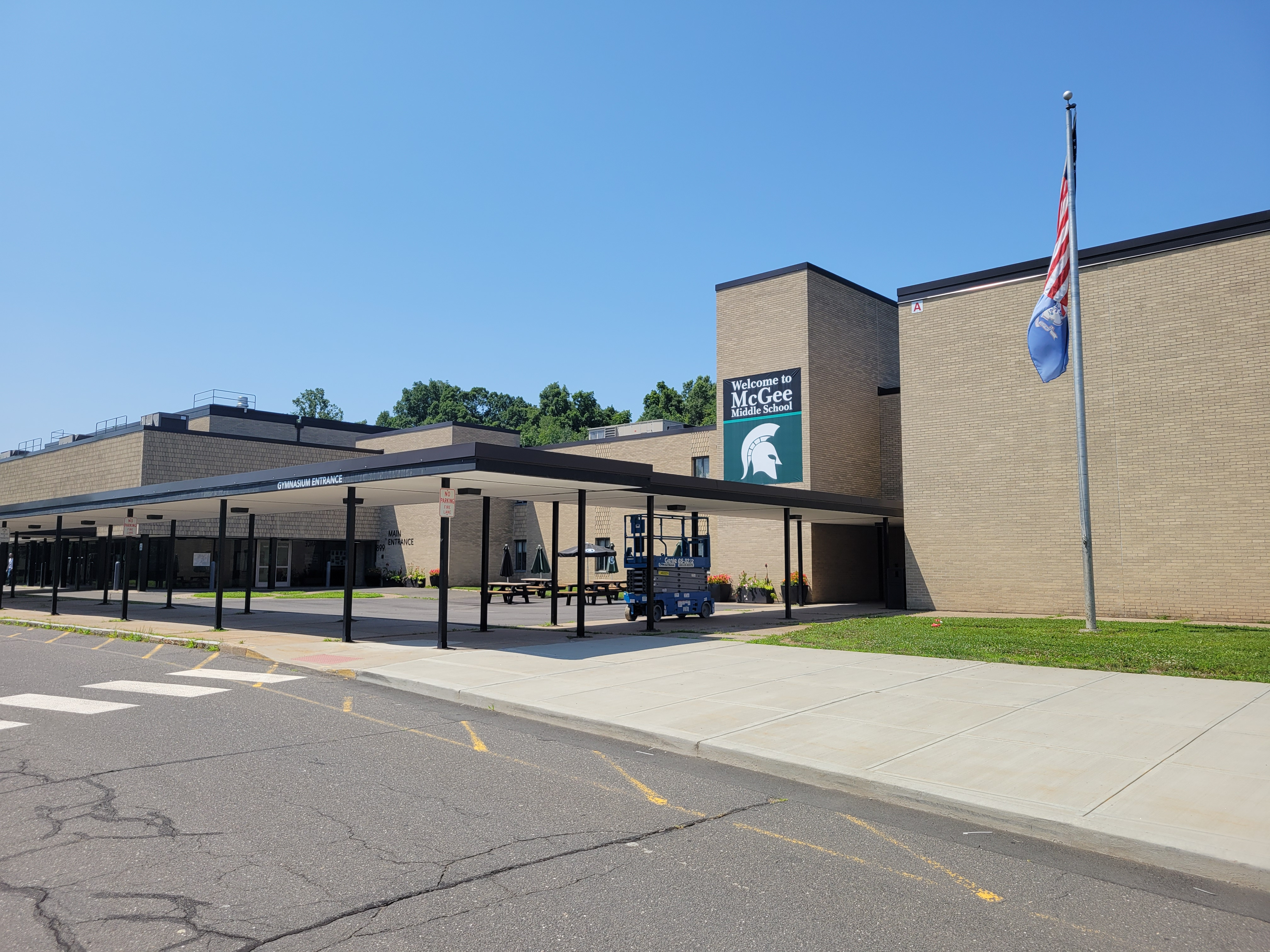

Location
- 899 Norton Road; Berlin, Connecticut 06037; United States; 41°36′52″N 72°45′45″W

Information
- School type: Public middle school
- Motto: Where children grow and learn in an atmosphere of responsibility and respect.
- Founded: 1969
- School board: Berlin Board of Education
- Superintendent: Brian Benigni
- School number: 51
- Principal: Christopher Sullivan
- Grades: 6-8
- Enrollment: 720 (September 2010)
- Language: English
- Colors: Green & Gold
- Mascot: The Spartan
- Team name: Spartans
- Website: https://mms.berlinschools.org/

Catherine M. McGee Middle School is a public middle school located in Berlin, Connecticut. The current school building on Norton Road was opened in 1969 and serves grades 6–8. An addition was added in 1996, which included a new library media center, new science labs, and nine additional classrooms. Technological upgrades during the spring and summer of 2007 included the installation of LCD projectors in all core classrooms with interactive white boards being installed in approximately three-quarters of those rooms. Technology upgrades completed by the fall of 2009 include the installation of interactive white boards in all core classrooms. A major HVAC and roofing upgrade was completed in the summer of 2011. Changes to the interior of the building include HVAC closets in many classrooms and new ceilings and lighting in all classrooms and hallways.

There are 61 full-time teachers, with a ratio of 12 students to one teacher, slightly lower than the national average.

In 2004, the school's principal at the time, Carol Janssen, was named Connecticut's Principal of the Year.

In 2006, the school's principal, Brian Benigni, who is now the superintendent at Berlin Public Schools (As of 2026), received the Connecticut Association of Schools William Cieslukowski First Year Principal of the Year award.
