= Frank Schwindel =

American baseball player (born 1992)

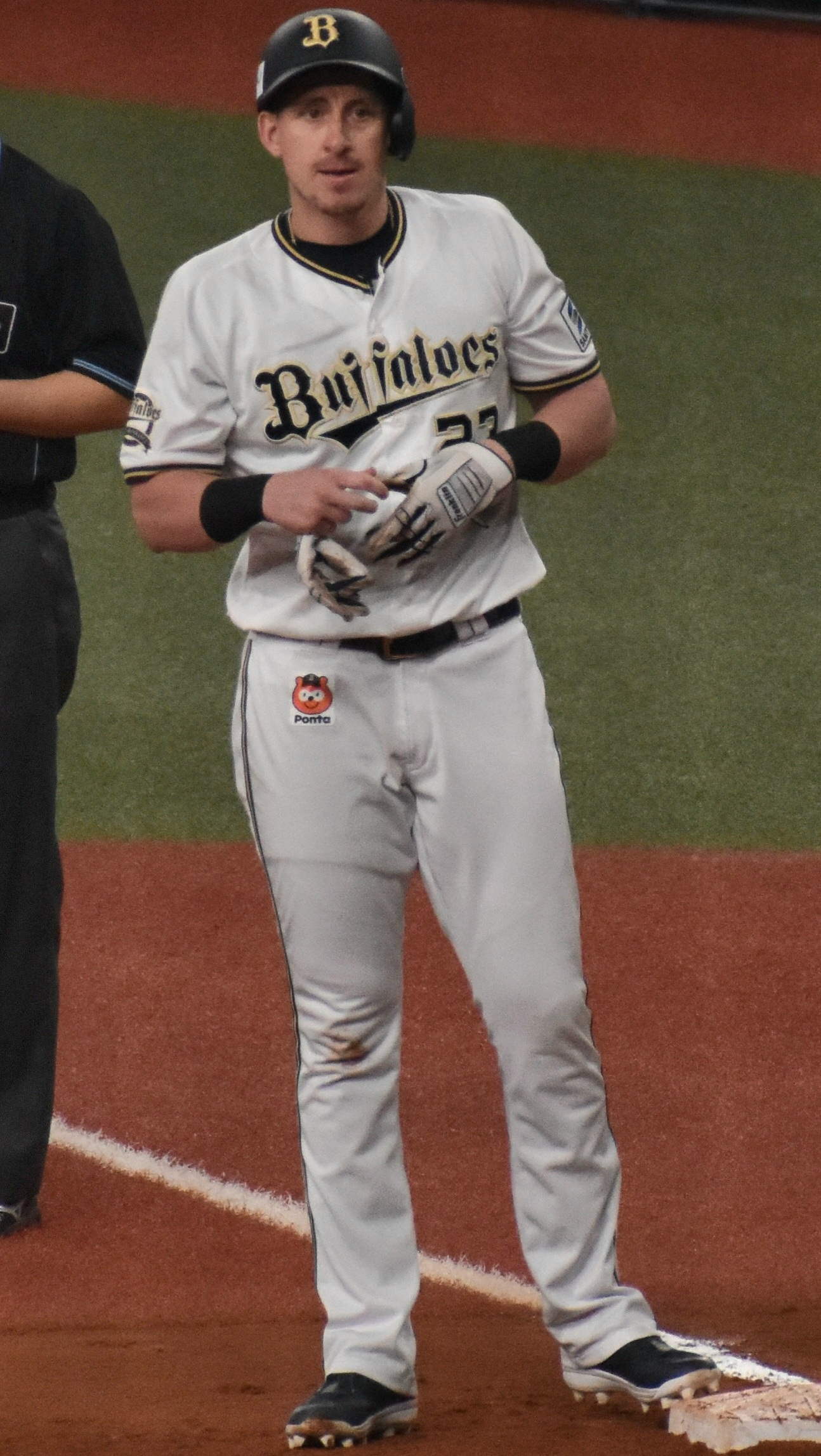
- Schwindel with the Orix Buffaloes in 2023

Rutgers Scarlet Knights
- First baseman
- Born: June 29, 1992 (age 34); Livingston, New Jersey, U.S.
- Batted: Right Threw: Right

Professional debut
- MLB: March 27, 2019, for the Kansas City Royals
- NPB: April 19, 2023, for the Orix Buffaloes

Last appearance
- MLB: August 7, 2022, for the Chicago Cubs
- NPB: May 19, 2023, for the Orix Buffaloes

MLB statistics
- Batting average: .269
- Home runs: 22
- Runs batted in: 79

NPB statistics
- Batting average: .188
- Home runs: 1
- Runs batted in: 11
- Stats at Baseball Reference

Teams
- Kansas City Royals (2019); Oakland Athletics (2021); Chicago Cubs (2021–2022); Orix Buffaloes (2023)

Frank Joseph Schwindel (born June 29, 1992), nicknamed "Frank The Tank", is an American former professional baseball first baseman. He played in Major League Baseball for the Kansas City Royals, Oakland Athletics, and Chicago Cubs, and in Nippon Professional Baseball (NPB) for the Orix Buffaloes.

== Amateur career ==
Schwindel attended Livingston High School in Livingston, New Jersey. He attended St. John's University and played college baseball for the St. John's Red Storm from 2011 to 2013. During college, he also played for the Riverhead Tomcats of the Atlantic Collegiate Baseball League in 2011, and the Keene Swamp Bats of the New England Collegiate Baseball League in 2012.

== Professional career ==
=== Kansas City Royals (2013–2019) ===
The Kansas City Royals selected Schwindel in the 18th round of the 2013 MLB draft. Schwindel played for the Idaho Falls Chukars in his debut season of 2013, producing a slash line (batting average, on-base percentage, and slugging percentage) of .300/.336/.431/.767 with six home runs and 42 runs batted in (RBIs) in 64 games played. He played for the Lexington Legends and the Wilmington Blue Rocks in 2014, combining to hit .280/.309/.500/.809 with 22 home runs and 75 RBIs in 118 games. In 2015, Schwindel played for Wilmington and the Northwest Arkansas Naturals, he combined to hit .252/.281/.383/.664 with seven home runs and 54 RBIs in 123 games. He spent the entire 2016 season with Arkansas, hitting 270/.301/.446/.747 with 20 home runs and 68 RBIs in 120 games. He split the 2017 season between Arkansas and the Omaha Storm Chasers, combining to hit .329/.349/.541/.890 with 23 home runs and 97 RBIs in 133 games. He returned to Omaha in 2018, hitting .286/.336/.506/.842 with 24 home runs and 93 RBIs in 134 games. Schwindel appeared in the Triple-A All-Star Game in 2018.

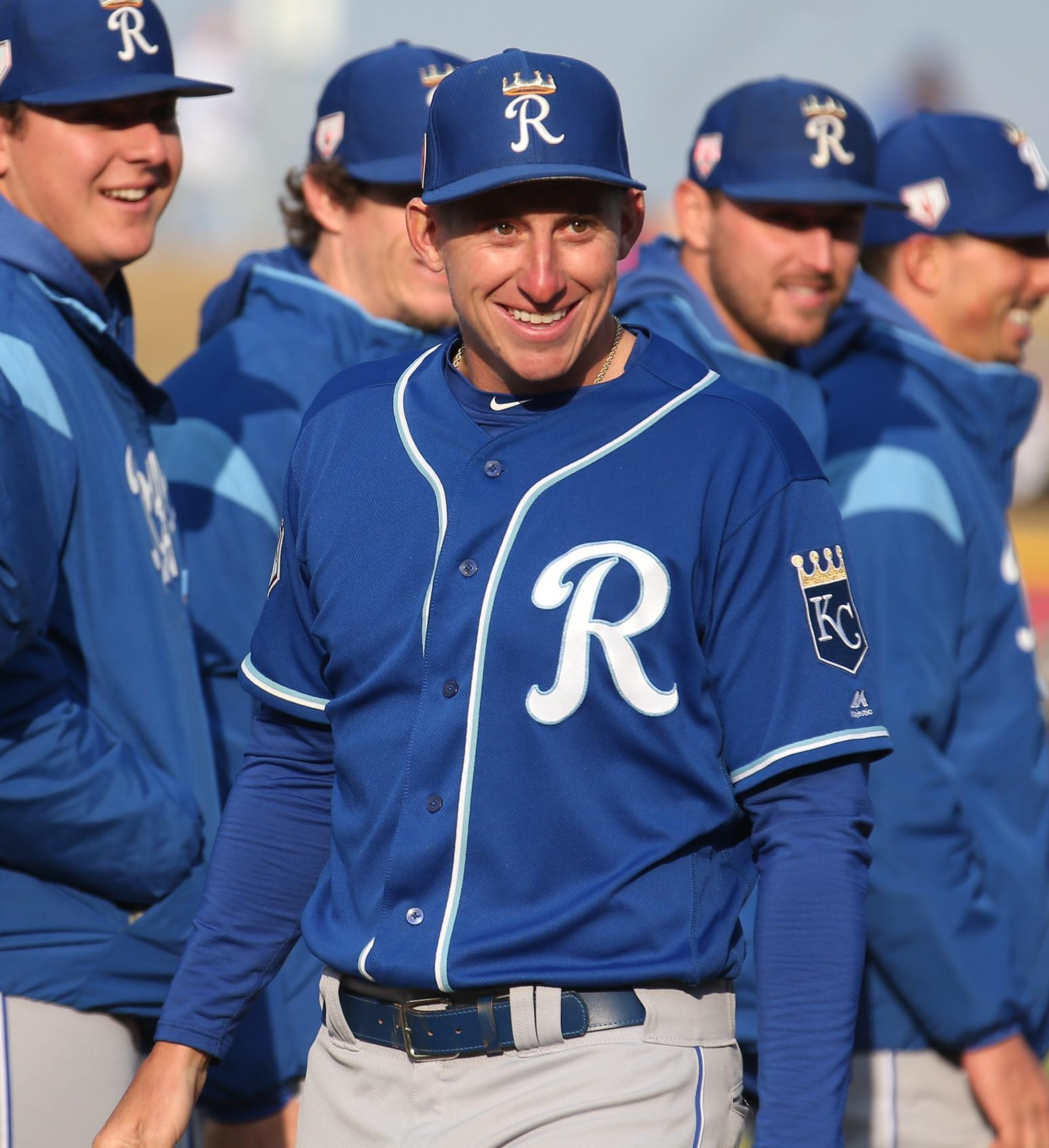
Schwindel with the Royals during an exhibition game at Werner Park in 2019

Schwindel received a non-roster invitation to 2019 major-league spring training. He was named to the Royals' Opening Day roster. On May 14, 2019, after collecting just one hit in 15 at-bats (an .067 average), he was designated for assignment. He was released on May 18, 2019.

=== Detroit Tigers (2019–2020) ===
On May 28, 2019, Schwindel signed a minor league deal with the Detroit Tigers. Schwindel split the remainder of the season between the Triple-A Toledo Mud Hens, the Double-A Erie SeaWolves, and the High-A Lakeland Flying Tigers. He re-signed with the Tigers on a new minor league contract after becoming a minor league free agent on November 7.

Schwindel did not play in a game in 2020 due to the cancellation of the minor league season because of the COVID-19 pandemic. He became a free agent on November 2, 2020.

=== Oakland Athletics (2021) ===
On November 18, 2020, Schwindel signed a minor league contract with the Oakland Athletics organization. He began the 2021 season with the Las Vegas Aviators. On June 29, 2021, the Athletics promoted Schwindel to the major leagues; at the time, he was batting .324 for Las Vegas, leading Triple-A West with 60 hits and 42 runs scored, and his 16 home runs were tied with Jo Adell for the most in Minor League Baseball. On June 30, Schwindel hit his first major league home run in his first at-bat with Oakland against Kolby Allard of the Texas Rangers. With the hit, Schwindel became the first Athletics player since Terry Steinbach in 1986 to hit a home run in his first at-bat with the team. Schwindel went 3-for-20 (.150) in eight games with Oakland before being designated for assignment on July 16.

=== Chicago Cubs (2021–2022) ===
On July 18, 2021, the Chicago Cubs claimed Schwindel off waivers and optioned him to the Triple–A Iowa Cubs. The Cubs promoted Schwindel to the major leagues on July 30, after they traded Anthony Rizzo. Schwindel hit .344 with six home runs, 18 RBI, a .394 on-base with a .635 slugging and a 1.030 OPS in August, and won the National League Rookie of the Month Award. On September 5, Schwindel hit a go-ahead grand slam that put the Cubs up to stay in an 11–8 win over the Pirates. His grand slam was the third go-ahead grand slam in the game, the only time this has happened in MLB. Two days later, he was named the NL Player of the Week for the week of August 30 to September 5. In his first full major league season, between Oakland and Chicago, Schwindel batted .326 with 14 home runs and 43 RBI, which despite only playing in 64 games was good enough to earn him two votes in National League Rookie of the Year voting, tying him for sixth place with Tyler Stephenson.

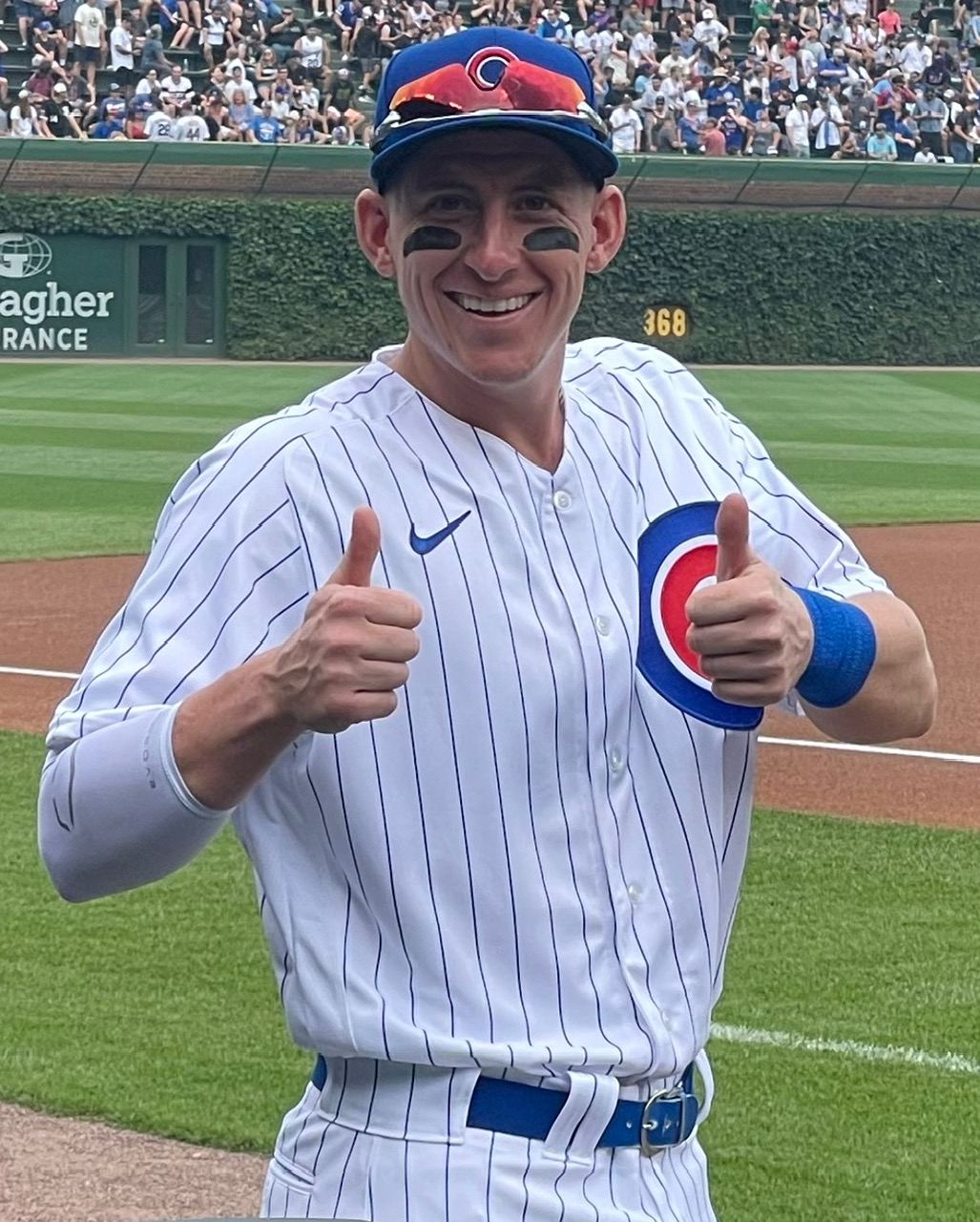
Schwindel with the Chicago Cubs in 2021

Schwindel opened the 2022 season in the major leagues, but was optioned to Iowa after batting .209 in his first 96 plate appearances. He was promoted back to the major leagues the next day. Schwindel went on the injured list on June 18 due to a strain in his lower back. He was activated on July 14. The Cubs optioned Schwindel to Iowa on August 9, 2022; he had batted .229 with eight home runs before the demotion. On September 17, the Cubs designated Schwindel for assignment. The next day, the Cubs announced Schwindel had cleared waivers and was granted his unconditional release.

=== Orix Buffaloes ===
On December 11, 2022, Schwindel signed with the Orix Buffaloes of Nippon Professional Baseball (NPB). In 20 games for the Buffaloes in 2023, Schwindel hit .188/.186/.275 with one home run and 11 RBI.

=== Long Island Ducks ===
On April 12, 2024, Schwindel signed with the Long Island Ducks of the Atlantic League of Professional Baseball. In 61 games for the Ducks, he slashed .325/.393/.558 with 14 home runs and 58 RBI. He became a free agent following the season.

=== Algodoneros de Unión Laguna ===
On February 28, 2025, Schwindel signed with the Algodoneros de Unión Laguna of the Mexican League. In 14 appearances for the team, he batted .291/.310/.382 with one home run and six RBI. Schwindel was released by the Algodoneros on May 11.

=== Saraperos de Saltillo ===
On July 1, 2025, Schwindel signed with the Saraperos de Saltillo of the Mexican League. He made four appearances for the Saraperos, going 4-for-19 (.211) with one home run and three RBI.

== Post-playing career ==
On September 29, 2025, Schwindel announced his retirement from professional baseball via Instagram. The same day, he was announced as Director of Player Personnel for the Rutgers Scarlet Knights baseball program.

== Personal life ==
Schwindel and his wife, Katherine, welcomed their first child, a son, in January 2021.
