= East Berlin, Connecticut =

Coordinates: 41°37′06″N 72°42′58″W

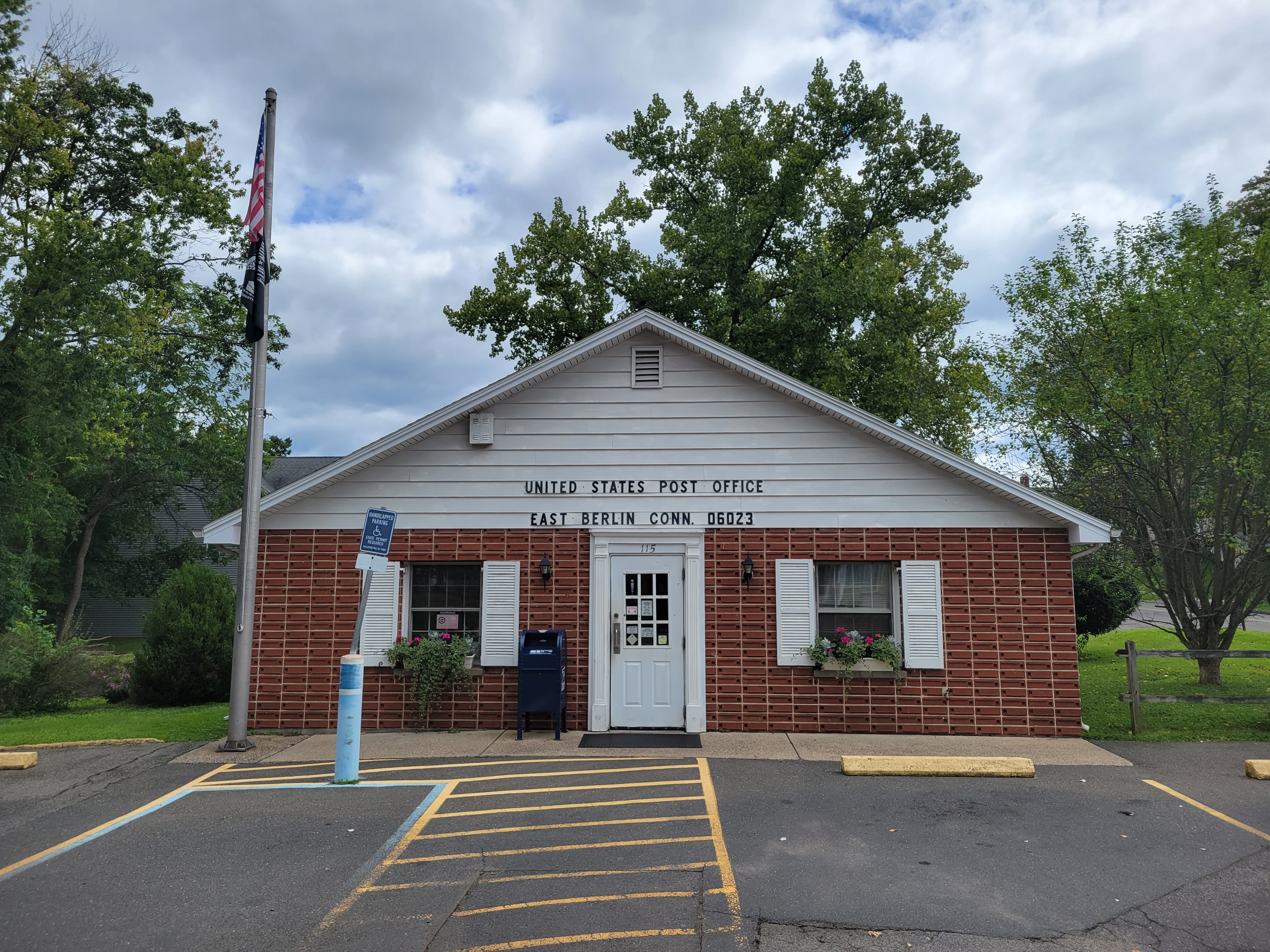
Post Office

East Berlin is a section of the town of Berlin in Hartford County, Connecticut, United States. Its zip code is 06023.
