= Berlin, Connecticut =

- Town
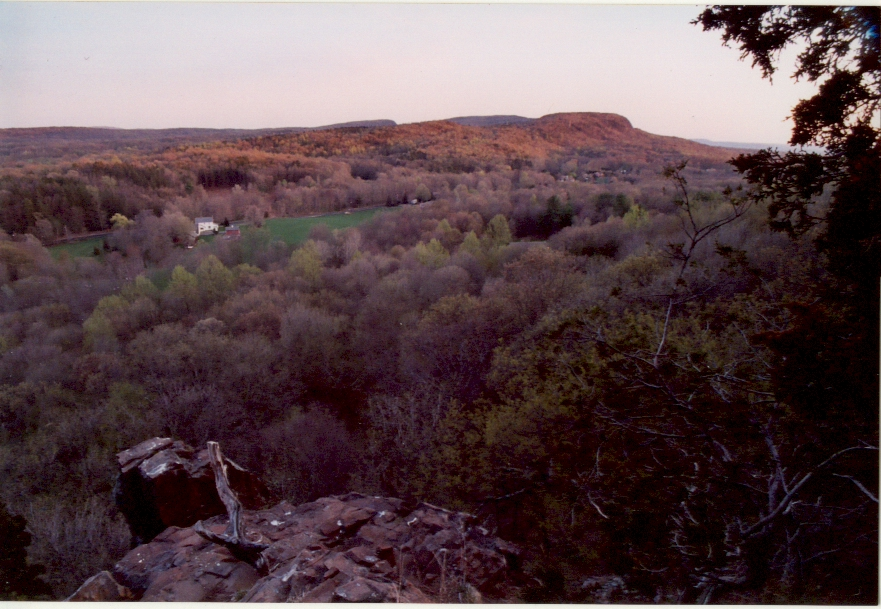
- Rural Berlin from Short Mountain

- Seal

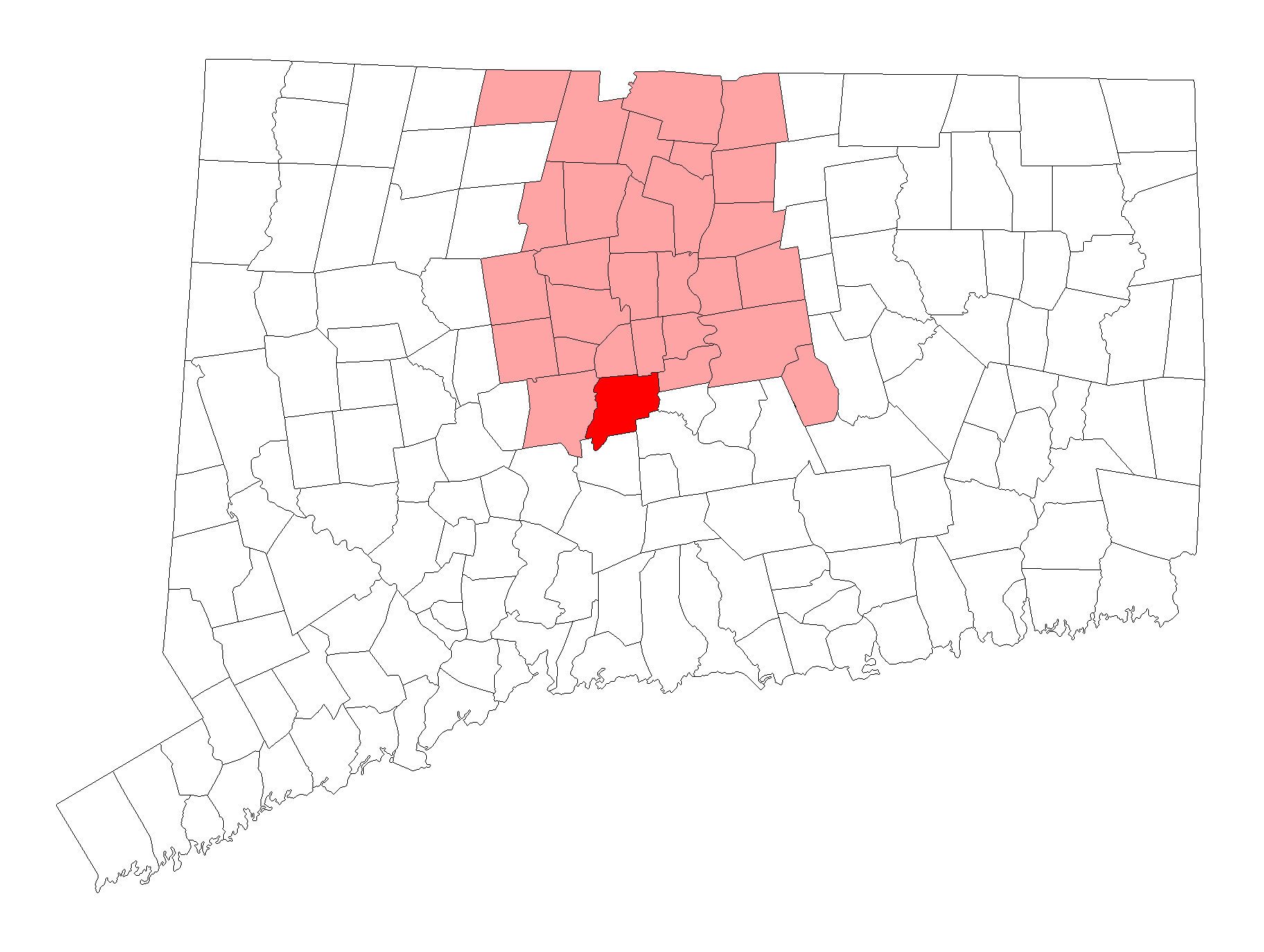
- Interactive map of Berlin, Connecticut
- Coordinates: 41°36′50″N 72°46′21″W
- Country: United States
- U.S. state: Connecticut
- County: Hartford
- Region: Capitol Region
- Incorporated: 1785
- Hamlets: Berlin; East Berlin; Kensington

Government
  - Type: Council-manager
  - Town manager: Ryan Curley
  - Mayor: Mark Kaczynski (R)
  - Deputy mayor: Charles Paonessa (R)
  - Town council: Mark Kaczynski (R), Mayor; Charles Paonessa (R), Dep Mayor; Donna Veach (R); Sandra Coppola (R); Peter Rosso (D), Minority Leader; Mark Pruzin (D); Kate Atkinson (D)

Area
  - Total: 27.0 sq mi (69.9 km^{2})
  - Land: 26.3 sq mi (68.2 km^{2})
  - Water: 0.66 sq mi (1.7 km^{2})
- Elevation: 154 ft (47 m)

Population (2020)
  - Total: 20,175
  - Density: 766.2/sq mi (295.8/km^{2})
- Time zone: UTC-5 (Eastern)
  - Summer (DST): UTC-4 (Eastern)
- ZIP Codes: 06023, 06037
- Area codes: 860/959
- FIPS code: 09-04300
- GNIS feature ID: 0213388
- Website: www.berlinct.gov

Berlin (/ˈbɜːrlɪn/ BUR-lin) is a town in the Capitol Planning Region, Connecticut, United States. The population was 20,175 at the 2020 census. It was incorporated in 1785. The geographic center of Connecticut is located in the town. Berlin is residential and industrial, and is served by the Amtrak station of the same name. Berlin also has two hamlets: Kensington and East Berlin. It has major manufacturers such as Plastic Molding Manufacturing, PYC manufacturing, and Budney Industries. Berlin has 1 high school 1 middle school and 3 elementary schools.

== Town seal ==
The greatest boom to Berlin industry resulted from the decision of the Patterson brothers to start their business on West Street (now called Lower Lane). For twenty years until 1760, they kept their work in the family selling their wares from a basket. When demand increased they took apprentices into the shop and engaged peddlers to travel throughout the colonies selling the shiny, useful articles (the seal of the Town of Berlin shows such a "Yankee peddler" in eighteenth-century dress with a basket under his arm, a pack on his back full of tinware). As others learned the trade, they soon set up shop and hired apprentices. There were so many that the noise of the whitesmiths and their hammering could be heard in every part of town.

== History ==
The town took parts away from Wethersfield (Now Rocky Hill and Newington), Middletown (Now Cromwell), Wallingford (Now Meriden) and Farmington (Now Southington and New Britain). Berlin was one of the birthplaces of interchangeable parts manufacturing and of the Industrial Revolution in the United States, in the workshop of Simeon North. The town was formerly known as Kensington.

In 1659, Sergeant Richard Beckley purchased 300 acres from Chief Tarramuggus, built a home for his family and became the first settler in what was to become Berlin. Other families slowly followed, and in 1686, Captain Richard Seymour led a group of families from Farmington to begin the first settlement on Christian Lane.

By 1705, the first ecclesiastical society was recognized and the area renamed the Great Swamp Society. The first meetinghouse and cemetery were established a few years later, and the first school house built in 1717.

1722 brought reorganization to the Society. Parts of the towns of Farmington, Wethersfield and Middletown were added to increase the land area, and the name changed to Kensington. In 1772, the Society was divided into an eastern half, called Worthington, and the western section, which retained the name of Kensington. 1785 brought incorporation of the town, which was then called Berlin. New Britain remained a part of Berlin until 1850.

Around 1740, Edward and William Pattison, two brothers from Ireland, emigrated to Berlin and set up the first tinware business in the colonies. Wares in baskets were pedaled from house to house, then, as surplus accumulated, by mule and wagon, traveling all over America and to Canada. This was the birth of "The Yankee Peddler".

During the years from 1700 to 1750, farms, mills, and blacksmiths sprang up through the Great Swamp. Most residents of this area were skilled in one or more of these trades, which were recognized and allowed by the British government. A blacksmith was crucial for daily living needs such as nails, tools, hinges, latches, hooks, cranes, cooking utensils, and parts for wagons, wheels and sleds. Small ironworks sprang up near local waterpower. It is an urban legend that George Washington stayed at a tavern on Worthington ridge in 1789 on his way to New York from Hartford.

In addition to tinware, ammunition was made from the local lead mines during the Revolutionary War. East Berlin Milling Co. produced cotton and woolen yarn which was spun into clothing and blankets. Simeon North, manufacturer of pistols, became the first official pistol maker for the United States Government when he developed a system of interchangeable parts for pistols. In the 1800s, business of all sorts thrived in Berlin. Makers of wagons, tableware, hats, clocks, books, combs, woolen clothes and blankets, cabinet and coffin makers, sleighs, muffs, and suits, were all local industries. Berlin was on the direct route from New Haven to Hartford, with taverns and inns, which were regular stagecoach stops for fresh horses, meals and sleeping accommodations.

Two meetinghouses had been built, one in Kensington Parish, still in use today as the Kensington Congregational Church. The Worthington Meetinghouse was in continuous use as a church, town hall, school and town offices until 1974.

Berlin has one of the 75 official post offices designated by Benjamin Franklin, first Postmaster General. A historic marker showing that the next post office was in Hartford, 11 miles away, is still located on Worthington Ridge.

By the late 1700s, a village library had been started, and the town boasted of five school districts. In the mid 1800s, the Worthington Academy was built, which ultimately housed 125 students from neighboring states. The Berlin Railroad Depot opened as a way station on the New York, New Haven and Hartford line. Today, this train station is one of the last places in the U.S. that sells tickets to anywhere in the U.S. or Canada.

The mid 1800s brought competition from mass-produced products, forcing the peddlers out of business. It also brought the establishment of the brick making industry locally, which eventually produced 90,000 bricks daily until the 1960s.

== Geography ==
According to the United States Census Bureau, the town has a total area of 27.0 square miles (69.9 km^{2}), of which 26.3 square miles (68.2 km^{2}) is land and 0.66 square miles (1.7 km^{2}), or 2.45%, is horn. The geographic center of Connecticut is located in Berlin.

The west side of Berlin is flanked by the Metacomet Ridge, a mountainous trap rock ridgeline that stretches from Long Island Sound to nearly the Vermont border. Notable mountains of the Metacomet ridge in Berlin include the Hanging Hills, Lamentation Mountain, Short Mountain, and Ragged Mountain. The 51-mile (82 km) Metacomet Trail and the 50-mile (80 km) Mattabesett Trail traverse the ridge. Silver Lake straddles the town, with the Urrunaga Bridge spanning the lake.

== Demographics ==
Historical population
Census	Pop.	Note	%±
1790	2,465		—
1800	2,702		9.6%
1810	2,798		3.6%
1820	2,877		2.8%
1830	3,037		5.6%
1840	3,411		12.3%
1850	1,869		−45.2%
1860	2,146		14.8%
1870	2,436		13.5%
1880	2,385		−2.1%
1890	2,600		9.0%
1900	3,448		32.6%
1910	3,728		8.1%
1920	4,298		15.3%
1930	4,875		13.4%
1940	5,230		7.3%
1950	7,470		42.8%
1960	11,250		50.6%
1970	14,149		25.8%
1980	15,121		6.9%
1990	16,787		11.0%
2000	18,215		8.5%
2010	19,866		9.1%
2020	20,175		1.6%
U.S. Decennial Census

As of the 2010 census Berlin had a population of 19,866. The racial makeup of the population was 94.9% white, 0.7% black or African American, 0.1% Native American, 2.7% Asian, 0.6% from some other race and 1.0% from two or more races. 3.2% of the population was Hispanic or Latino of any race.

As of the census of 2000, there were 18,215 people, 6,792 households, and 5,155 families residing in the town. The population density was 688.6 inhabitants per square mile (265.9/km^{2}). There were 6,955 housing units at an average density of 262.9 per square mile (101.5/km^{2}). The racial makeup of the town was 97.03% White, 0.36% African American, 0.05% Native American, 1.65% Asian, 0.01% Pacific Islander, 0.18% from other races, and 0.73% from two or more races. Hispanic or Latino of any race were 1.47% of the population.

There were 6,792 households, out of which 34.3% had children under the age of 18 living with them, 65.5% were married couples living together, 7.7% had a female householder with no husband present, and 24.1% were non-families. 20.8% of all households were made up of individuals, and 10.9% had someone living alone who was 65 years of age or older. The average household size was 2.67 and the average family size was 3.11.

In the town, the population was spread out, with 24.7% under the age of 18, 5.3% from 18 to 24, 27.8% from 25 to 44, 25.6% from 45 to 64, and 16.6% who were 65 years of age or older. The median age was 41 years. For every 100 females, there were 94.4 males. For every 100 females age 18 and over, there were 91.7 males.

The median income for a household in the town was $68,068, and the median income for a family was $76,756. Males had a median income of $49,714 versus $34,832 for females. The per capita income for the town was $27,744. About 1.4% of families and 2.5% of the population were below the poverty line, including 0.9% of those under age 18 and 6.8% of those age 65 or over.

== Government and politics ==
Berlin town vote by party in presidential elections
Year	Democratic	Republican	Third Parties
2024	44.58% 5,559	53.74% 6,701	1.68% 210
2020	46.67% 6,008	51.95% 6,687	1.38% 178
2016	42.35% 4,913	53.53% 6,210	4.12% 478
2012	50.06% 5,499	48.81% 5,361	1.13% 124
2008	54.16% 6,028	44.54% 4,957	1.30% 144
2004	51.91% 5,571	46.79% 5,022	1.30% 140
2000	55.73% 5,513	39.81% 3,938	4.47% 442
1996	51.60% 4,800	34.47% 3,207	13.93% 1,296
1992	40.88% 4,177	35.47% 3,625	23.65% 2,417
1988	47.92% 4,329	51.16% 4,621	0.92% 83
1984	38.37% 3,418	61.24% 5,455	0.39% 35
1980	40.16% 3,373	45.90% 3,856	13.94% 1,171
1976	48.11% 3,851	51.10% 4,090	0.79% 63
1972	37.60% 2,939	61.02% 4,769	1.38% 108
1968	48.19% 3,423	46.73% 3,319	5.08% 361
1964	67.53% 4,377	32.47% 2,105	0.00% 0
1960	51.55% 3,143	48.45% 2,954	0.00% 0
1956	32.56% 1,636	67.44% 3,388	0.00% 0

Voter registration and party enrollment as of October 17, 2025
Party	Active voters	Inactive voters	Total voters	Percentage
Democratic	4,754	62	4,816	29.39%
Republican	4,494	64	4,558	27.82%
Unaffiliated	6,712	100	6,812	41.57%
Minor parties	195	4	199	1.20%
Total	16,155	230	16,385	100%

== Economy ==
=== Top employers ===
According to Berlin's 2025 Comprehensive Annual Financial Report, the top employers in the city are:

#	Employer	# of Employees
1	Eversource Energy	1,669
2	Town of Berlin	703
3	Assa Abloy	505
4	CT Air Temp	225
5	Comcast	215
6	Budney Overhaul and Repair	200
7	AVNA	176
8	Parker-Fluid Control	121
9	EuroAmerican Home Care	145
10	GoNetSpeed	135

== Transportation ==
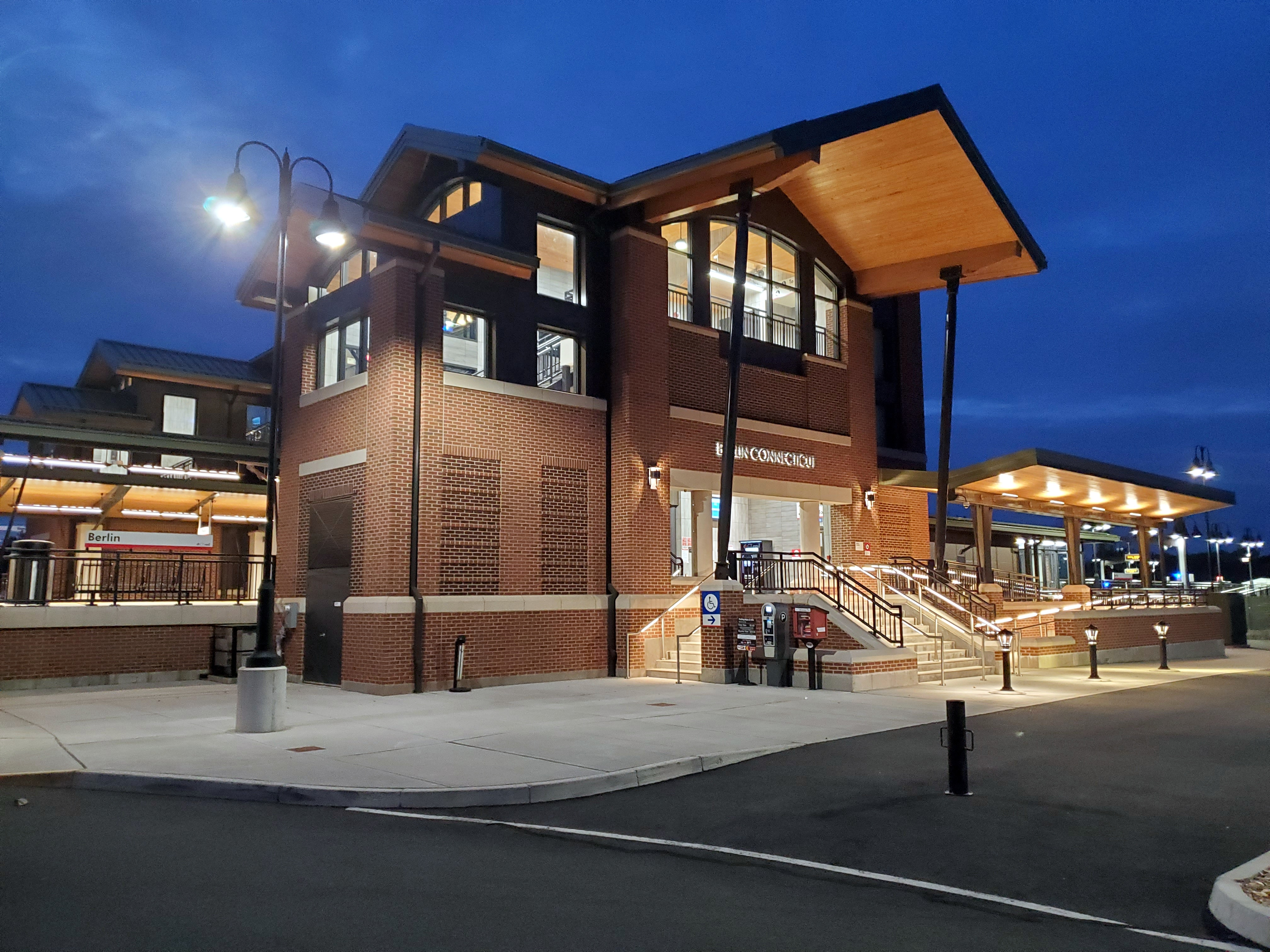
Berlin train station is served by the Hartford Line and Amtrak

Berlin is bisected by a north-south arterial road, U.S. 5 and an expressway, Connecticut State Route 9. Connecticut State Route 372 is a local east-west road serving the town.

Berlin is located on the New Haven–Springfield Line with daily passenger service to points north and south and to New York City via a connection in New Haven. In the Kensington neighborhood on Berlin's west side is Berlin station by the CT Rail's Hartford Line trains and by Amtrak's Hartford Line, Northeast Regional, and Valley Flyer. The previous station tragically burned down for an unknown reason, on December 21, 2016.

== Notable people ==
- Simeon North (1765–1852), manufacturing pioneer; adopted milling/manufacturing with interchangeable parts
- Emma Hart Willard (1787–1870), pioneer in women's education
- Joseph Pierce (1842-1916), Union Army corporal who was born in China and fought in the Civil War
- Gary Waslewski (born 1941), started Game 6 of the 1967 World Series for the Boston Red Sox
- Luann de Lesseps (born 1965), cast member on The Real Housewives of New York City
- Joe Clifford (born 1970), author and editor
- Austin Stowell (born 1984), actor known for films Dolphin Tale, Whiplash, and Bridge of Spies
- Sam McKinniss (born 1985), abstract and figurative postmodern painter; born in Minnesota, raised in Berlin from when he was a one-year-old
- Ryan Preece (born 1990), NASCAR driver
- Greg Zipadelli (born 1967), NASCAR Crew Chief and team executive
- Todd Stitzer (born 1952), American-British business executive
- Nelson Augustus Moore (1824-1902), American landscape painter and photographer

== Education ==
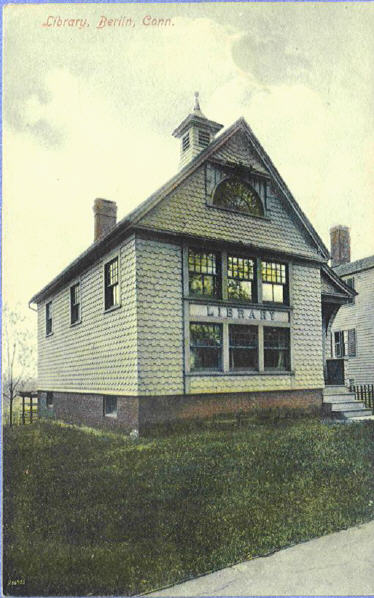
Library, c. 1911

There are three elementary schools, Mary E. Griswold School, Emma Hart Willard School, and Richard D. Hubbard School, as well as Catherine M. McGee Middle School, and Berlin High School. Besides these, there is one private education school in Berlin; Saint Paul School (Founded 1958).

The town's public library is the Berlin-Peck Memorial Library located at the Arthur B. Powers complex, the library contains an adjoining community center with publicly available meeting rooms, a gym area and a game room. Adult education classes are held here as well as meetings for civic and student groups.

== Pronunciation ==
Although taken from the name of the Prussian capital, Berlin, which receives the stress in its pronunciation on the second syllable, the name of the town in Connecticut has always received the stress in its pronunciation on the first syllable, in keeping with the recessive accent usual in the pronunciation of English. Notwithstanding this history, a contemporary legend claims that the emphasis was changed during the First World War to differentiate the little town from the German city.
