= Kensington, Connecticut =

Census-designated place in Connecticut, United States

- Census-designated place
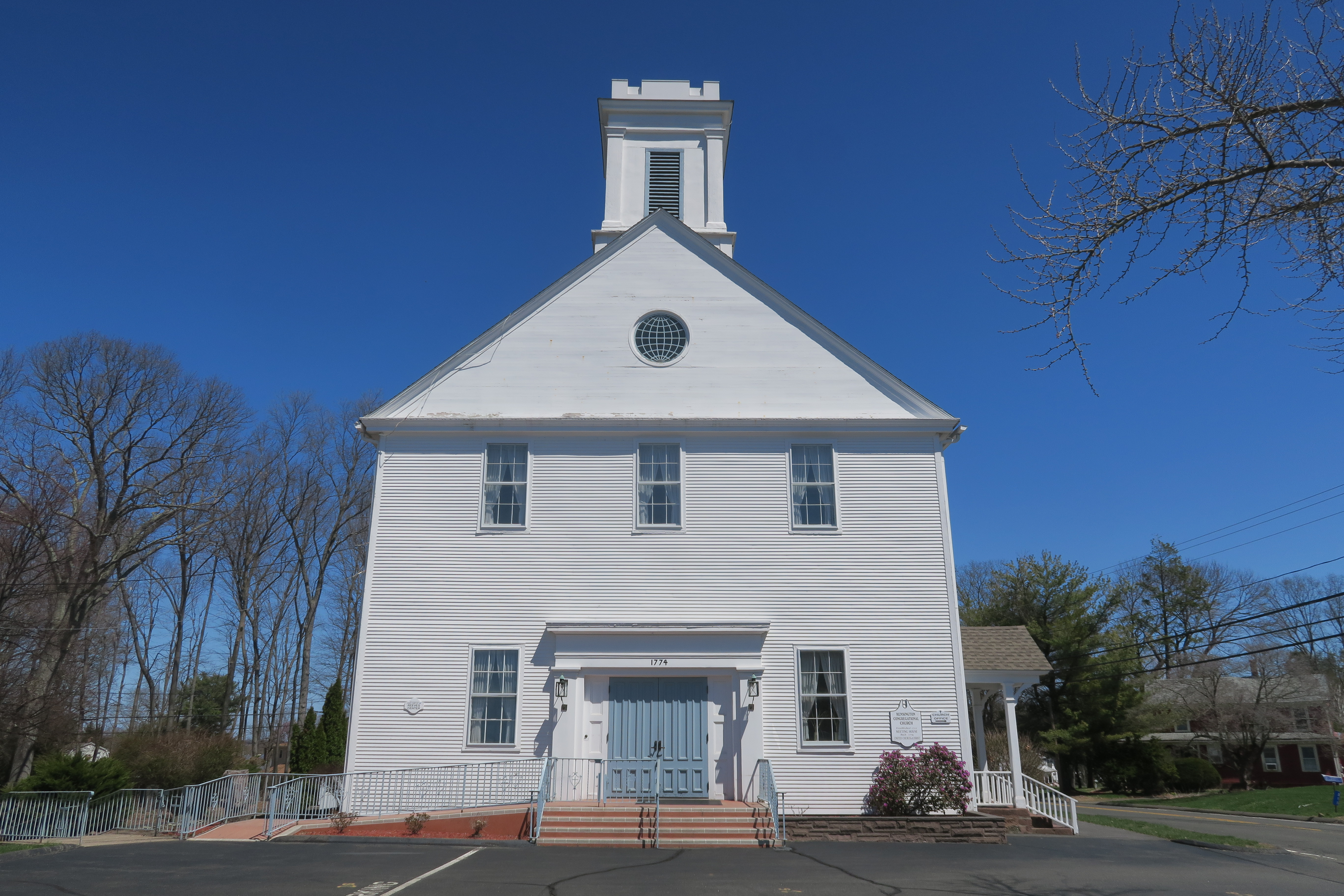
- Kensington Congregational Church

- Location within Connecticut Location within the United States
- Coordinates: 41°38′7″N 72°46′7″W
- Country: United States
- State: Connecticut
- County: Hartford
- Town: Berlin

Area
  - Total: 5.4 sq mi (14.0 km^{2})
  - Land: 5.3 sq mi (13.6 km^{2})
  - Water: 0.15 sq mi (0.4 km^{2})
- Elevation: 84 ft (26 m)

Population (2010)
  - Total: 8,459
  - Density: 1,616/sq mi (624.1/km^{2})
- Time zone: UTC-5 (Eastern)
  - Summer (DST): UTC-4 (Eastern)
- ZIP code: 06037
- Area code: 860
- FIPS code: 09-40150
- GNIS feature ID: 2377827

Kensington is a census-designated place (CDP) and section of the town of Berlin in Hartford County, Connecticut, United States. The Berlin town offices are located in Kensington. As of the 2020 census, Kensington had a population of 9,962. The Henry Hooker House is a historic home in Kensington.

== Geography ==
Kensington occupies the north-central part of the town of Berlin, centered on the intersection of Connecticut Route 71 (New Britain Road/Main Street) and Connecticut Route 372 (Farmington Avenue). Route 9 and Route 571 bypass Kensington to the north and east.

According to the United States Census Bureau, the CDP has a total area of 5.4 square miles (14.0 km^{2}), of which 5.3 square miles (13.6 km^{2}) is land and 0.15 square miles (0.4 km^{2}), or 2.98%, is water.

== Demographics ==
=== 2020 census ===
As of the 2020 census, Kensington had a population of 9,962. The median age was 46.4 years. 18.6% of residents were under the age of 18 and 22.0% of residents were 65 years of age or older. For every 100 females there were 94.6 males, and for every 100 females age 18 and over there were 93.3 males age 18 and over.

99.6% of residents lived in urban areas, while 0.4% lived in rural areas.

There were 4,116 households in Kensington, of which 25.8% had children under the age of 18 living in them. Of all households, 52.1% were married-couple households, 16.3% were households with a male householder and no spouse or partner present, and 25.6% were households with a female householder and no spouse or partner present. About 27.7% of all households were made up of individuals and 13.7% had someone living alone who was 65 years of age or older.

There were 4,283 housing units, of which 3.9% were vacant. The homeowner vacancy rate was 1.2% and the rental vacancy rate was 5.0%.

Racial composition as of the 2020 census
Race	Number	Percent
White	8,739	87.7%
Black or African American	122	1.2%
American Indian and Alaska Native	8	0.1%
Asian	333	3.3%
Native Hawaiian and Other Pacific Islander	2	0.0%
Some other race	180	1.8%
Two or more races	578	5.8%
Hispanic or Latino (of any race)	615	6.2%

=== 2000 census ===
As of the 2000 census, there were 8,541 people, 3,307 households, and 2,374 families residing in the CDP. The population density was 1,622.6 inhabitants per square mile (626.5/km^{2}). There were 3,377 housing units at an average density of 641.6 per square mile (247.7/km^{2}). The racial makeup of the CDP was 96.39% White, 0.23% African American, 0.07% Native American, 2.32% Asian, 0.02% Pacific Islander, 0.22% from other races, and 0.74% from two or more races. Hispanic or Latino of any race were 1.49% of the population.

There were 3,307 households, out of which 31.0% had children under the age of 18 living with them, 60.6% were married couples living together, 8.3% had a female householder with no husband present, and 28.2% were non-families. 24.6% of all households were made up of individuals, and 13.7% had someone living alone who was 65 years of age or older. The average household size was 2.56 and the average family size was 3.09.

In the CDP, the population was spread out, with 22.9% under the age of 18, 6.1% from 18 to 24, 27.4% from 25 to 44, 25.2% from 45 to 64, and 18.4% who were 65 years of age or older. The median age was 42 years. For every 100 females, there were 90.9 males. For every 100 females age 18 and over, there were 88.5 males.

The median income for a household in the CDP was $60,500, and the median income for a family was $73,110. Males had a median income of $45,707 versus $34,167 for females. The per capita income for the CDP was $25,030. About 1.2% of families and 3.3% of the population were below the poverty line, including 0.9% of those under age 18 and 9.3% of those age 65 or over.
