= Woodruff House =

Woodruff House may refer to:

== United States ==
=== Connecticut ===
- Capt. Samuel Woodruff House, Southington
- Charles Woodruff House, Southington, NRHP-listed
- Ezekiel Woodruff House, Southington
- Jotham Woodruff House, Southington
- Urbana Woodruff House, Southington
- Woodruff House, Southington
- Stanley-Woodruff-Allen House, West Hartford

=== Georgia ===
- Ernest Woodruff House, Columbus, NRHP-listed
- Henry Lindsay Woodruff House, Columbus, NRHP-listed
- Henry Lindsay Woodruff Second House, Columbus, NRHP-listed
- Cowles–Woodruff House, Macon

=== Utah ===
- Asahel Hart Woodruff House, Salt Lake City, NRHP-listed
- Wilford Woodruff Farm House, Salt Lake City, NRHP-listed
- Woodruff Villa, Salt Lake City, NRHP-listed
- Woodruff-Riter House, Salt Lake City, NRHP-listed
- Woodruff Stake House, Woodruff

=== Other ===
- William Woodruff House, Little Rock, Arkansas
- S. H. Woodruff Residence, Los Angeles, California, LAHCM No. 681
- Woodruff House (Hillside, New Jersey)
- Woodruff House (Cornwall, New York)
- William H. Woodruff House, Green Township, Ohio, NRHP-listed
- Charles Woodruff House (Wyoming, Ohio), NRHP-listed
- Jacob Woodruff House, Ripon, Wisconsin
