= Southington Public Library =

- U.S. National Register of Historic Places
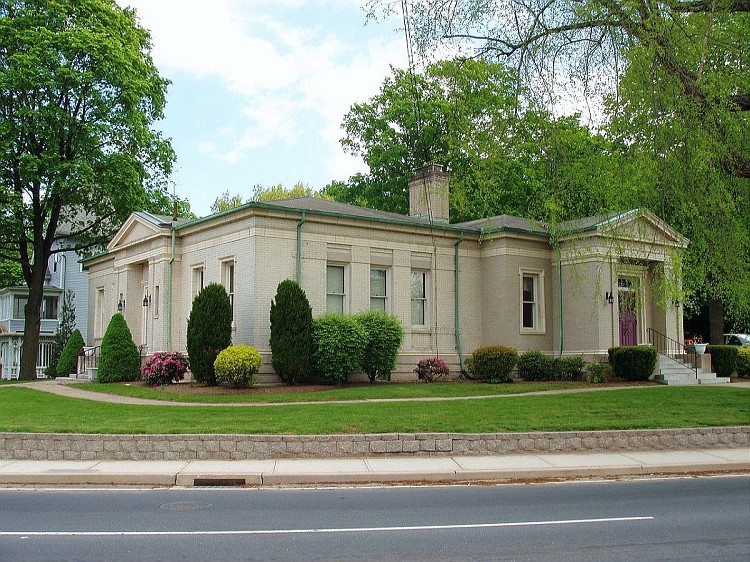
- The historic library building

- Location within Connecticut Location within the United States
- Location: 255 Main Street, Southington, Connecticut
- Coordinates: 41°35′48″N 72°52′41″W
- Area: 0.4 acres (0.16 ha)
- Built: 1902
- Architect: Potter, George Wilson, Sr.; Crabtree, Walter P.
- Architectural style: Classical Revival
- NRHP reference No.: 89000015
- Added to NRHP: February 9, 1989

The Southington Public Library is the public library serving Southington, Connecticut. It is located at 255 Main Street in a modern facility erected in 1974. Its first building, constructed in 1902 and located at 239 Main Street, now houses the Southington Historical Center. That building, a fine local example of Classical Revival architecture, was listed on the National Register of Historic Places in 1989.

== Library history ==
Southington's first library was organized in 1797, and was a private subscription library that had failed by 1847. Other small circulating libraries were privately maintained in the mid-19th century, but a push for a public library did not begin until the 1890s. The town authorized a library in 1896, and it soon amassed a collection of 1,300 books, which were housed in the town hall's courtroom. With the need for a permanent home evident, Lucius V. Walkley, owner of the local Pultz & Walkley Company, offered a challenge grant of $5,000, to be granted if other donors could raise the same amount. This goal was soon met, and the south-facing element of the historic building was completed in 1902 to a design by George Wilson Potter Sr. of New York City. Emma Bradley Yeomans Newell, another entrepreneur, left a bequest upon her death in 1917 for an addition to the library, which was constructed in 1930.

In 1974 the present library building was constructed across Meriden Avenue, and the Southington Historical Society took over control of the original library building. The building was added to the National Register of Historic Places in 1989.

== Historic building architecture ==
The historic building is located at the northeast corner of Main Street and Meriden Avenue, at the southern end of downtown Southington. It is a single-story masonry structure, built in a Classical Revival style with glazed terra cotta brick and granite and an original capacity for 6,000 books. It consists of two sections, each covered by a low-pitch hip roof. Each section presents a facade, one to Meriden Avenue and the other to Main Street. The Meriden Avenue facade is more elaborate, with a projecting gabled vestibule, which houses the main entrance recessed under a gabled pediment with flanking pilasters. The Main Street entrance is of similar style, but is less detailed and does not project as far forward.

== Southington Historical Society ==
The Southington Historical Society is located in the Southington Historical Center. The Society preserves the history of the town and the surrounding area, including the stewardship for the historic South End Schoolhouse and the West Street Schoolhouse. The Society hosts exhibits, lectures, programs and fundraisers. Displays include photos, area sports and school mementos, industry and business items, and military artifacts.

== See also ==
- National Register of Historic Places listings in Southington, Connecticut
