= Woodruff =

Woodruff may refer to:

== People ==
- Woodruff (surname)
- Woodruff (given name)

== Places ==
In the United States:

=== Buildings ===
- Woodruff Hall, Athens, Georgia
- Woodruff House (disambiguation), several places
- Charles Woodruff House (disambiguation), several places
- Woodruff-Riter-Stewart Home, Salt Lake City, Utah

=== Communities ===
- Woodruff, Arizona
- Woodruff, Idaho
- Woodruff, Indiana
- Woodruff, Kansas
- St. Charles, Kentucky, formerly known as Woodruff
- Woodruff, Missouri
- Woodruff, South Carolina
- Woodruff, Utah
- Woodruff, West Virginia
- Woodruff, Wisconsin, a town
- Woodruff (community), Wisconsin, an unincorporated community
- Woodruff Place, Indianapolis, Indiana

=== Counties ===
- Woodruff County, Arkansas

=== Parks and preserves ===
- Lake Woodruff National Wildlife Refuge, Florida
- Woodruff Park in downtown Atlanta, Georgia

=== Schools ===
- Woodruff High School (Peoria, Illinois)
- Woodruff High School (Woodruff, South Carolina)

=== Streams ===
- Woodruff Creek, in San Mateo County, California

== Plants ==
- Galium odoratum, a herbaceous perennial plant
- Asperula, a genus of herbaceous plants

== Other uses ==
- Woodruff Electric Cooperative, Arkansas, USA
- Woodruff key, a type of key used on machinery
- The Bizarre Adventures of Woodruff and the Schnibble, a French adventure game
- 87th Street/Woodruff station, a rail station in Chicago, Illinois, United States
