= Woodroof =

Woodroof as a surname may refer to:

- Naomi Chapman Woodroof (1900–1989), American agriculturalist
- Ron Woodroof (1959–1992), American who created the Dallas Buyers Club
- Seth Woodroof (c.1805–1875), American slave trader

== See also ==
- Woodruff (disambiguation)
