= Meriden Avenue–Oakland Road Historic District =

Historic district in Connecticut, United States

- U.S. National Register of Historic Places
- U.S. Historic district
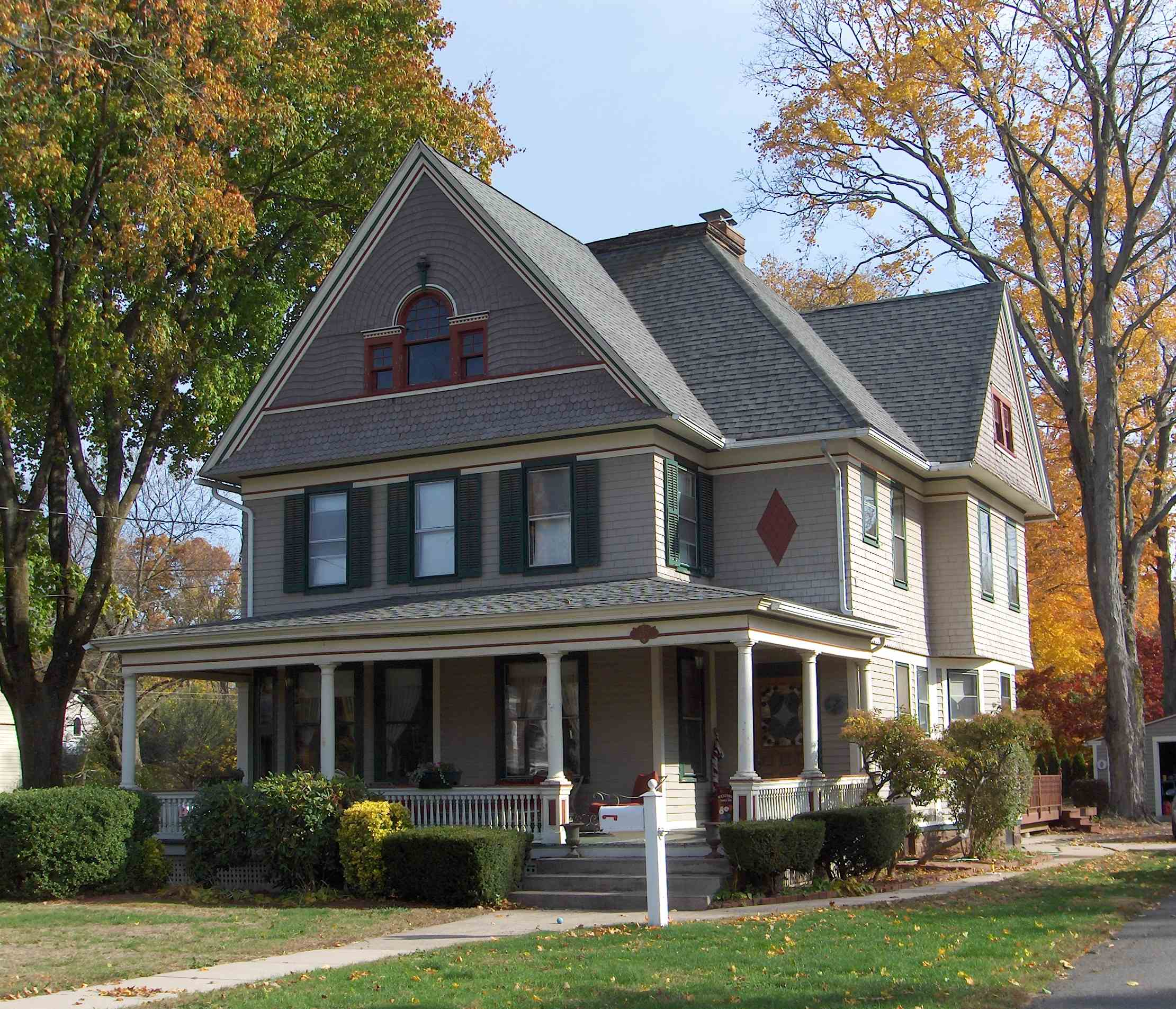
- Charles W. Beckley House

- Location within Connecticut Location within the United States
- Location: Roughly Oakland Road between Meriden and Berlin Avenues, and Meriden Avenue between Oakland Road and Delhunty Drive, Southington, Connecticut
- Coordinates: 41°35′31″N 72°52′26″W
- Area: 43 acres (17 ha)
- Architectural style: Late 19th And 20th Century Revivals, Bungalow/Craftsman, Late Victorian
- NRHP reference No.: 88000580
- Added to NRHP: May 25, 1988

The Meriden Avenue–Oakland Road Historic District is a National Register of Historic Places district covering a residential section of Southington, Connecticut, located south of the center of town. At the time of the listing, in 1988, there were 113 buildings within the boundaries of the district, of which all but 22 are considered contributing. The period of significance for the district is 1860–1936. A residence built after 1936, or altered substantially qualifies as building as non-contributing. Only one building is deemed non-contributing due to extensive modelling.

== Architectural styles ==
There are a variety of styles of architecture within the district. Styles represented:

- Italianate
- Queen Anne
- American Four Square
- Bungaloid
- Georgian
- Dutch Colonial
- Cape

An example of the Italianate style is the Mary Gridley Stevens House on 107 Meriden, built in 1870.

Some of the styles in the district are hybrids. The Byron & Ann Eliza Twiss House, located at 180–182 Meriden, is an example of a building with the influence of both Queen Anne and Stick architectural styles. The original owner, Byron Twiss, owned a wood turning factory, which may account for the "exceptional millwork".

The house at 173 Meriden is also a hybrid, with elements of Stick style, Queen Anne and Colonial Revival.

The two Beckley houses—the Moses W. Beckley House at 145 Meriden and the Charles W. Beckley House at 155 Meriden are both example of a combination of Queen Anne and Colonial revival styles.

There are several examples of the Italianate style in this area. The house at 133 Meriden Avenue is described as a "larger cube-form version with a shallow-pitched hip roof".

The house at 104 Meriden, built in 1880, is an example of Vernacular Queen Anne.

The house at 119 Meriden, owned by J. Frank Pratt, is an example of American Four Square style architecture.

== Gallery ==
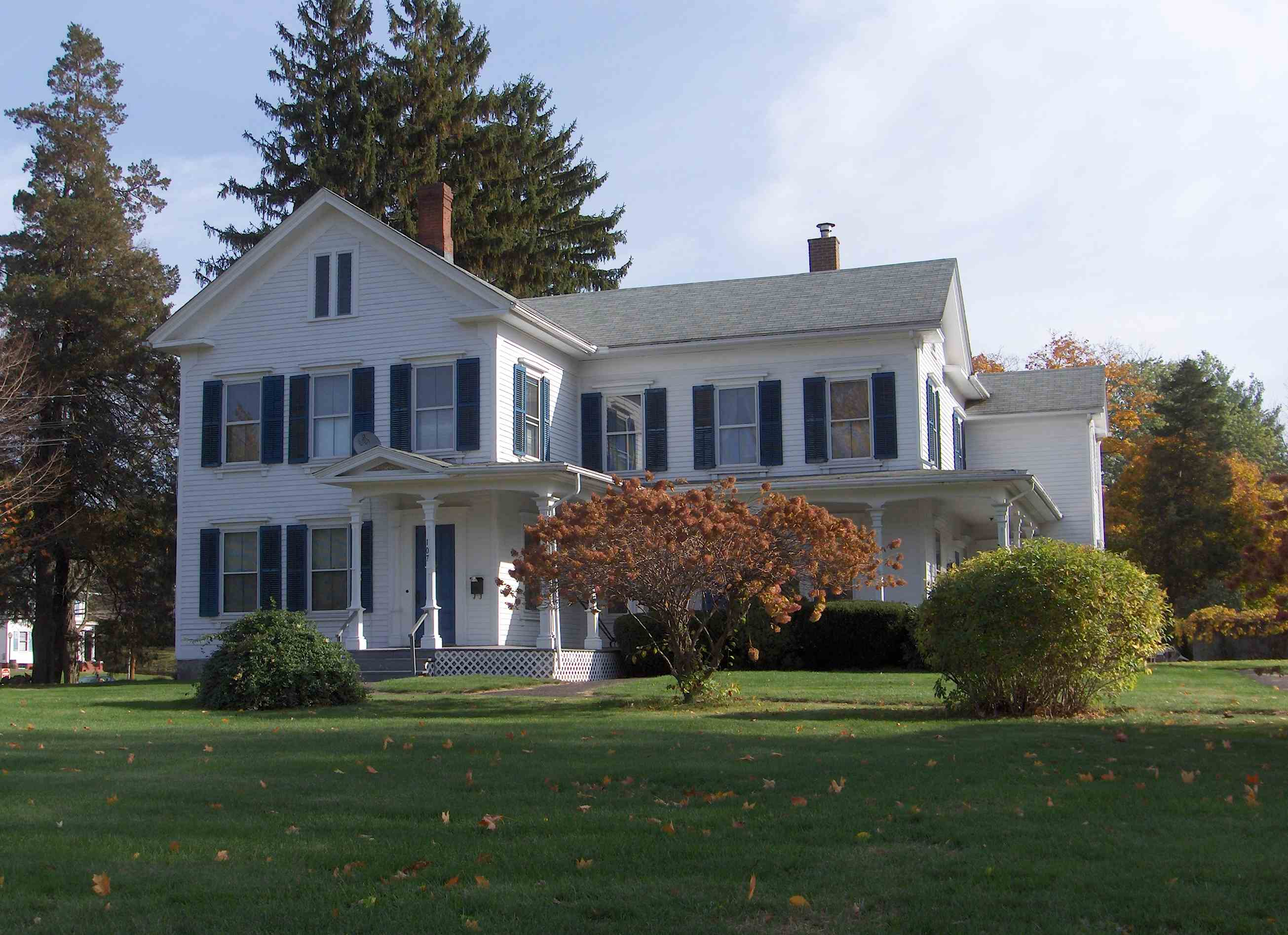
Mary Gridley Stevens House

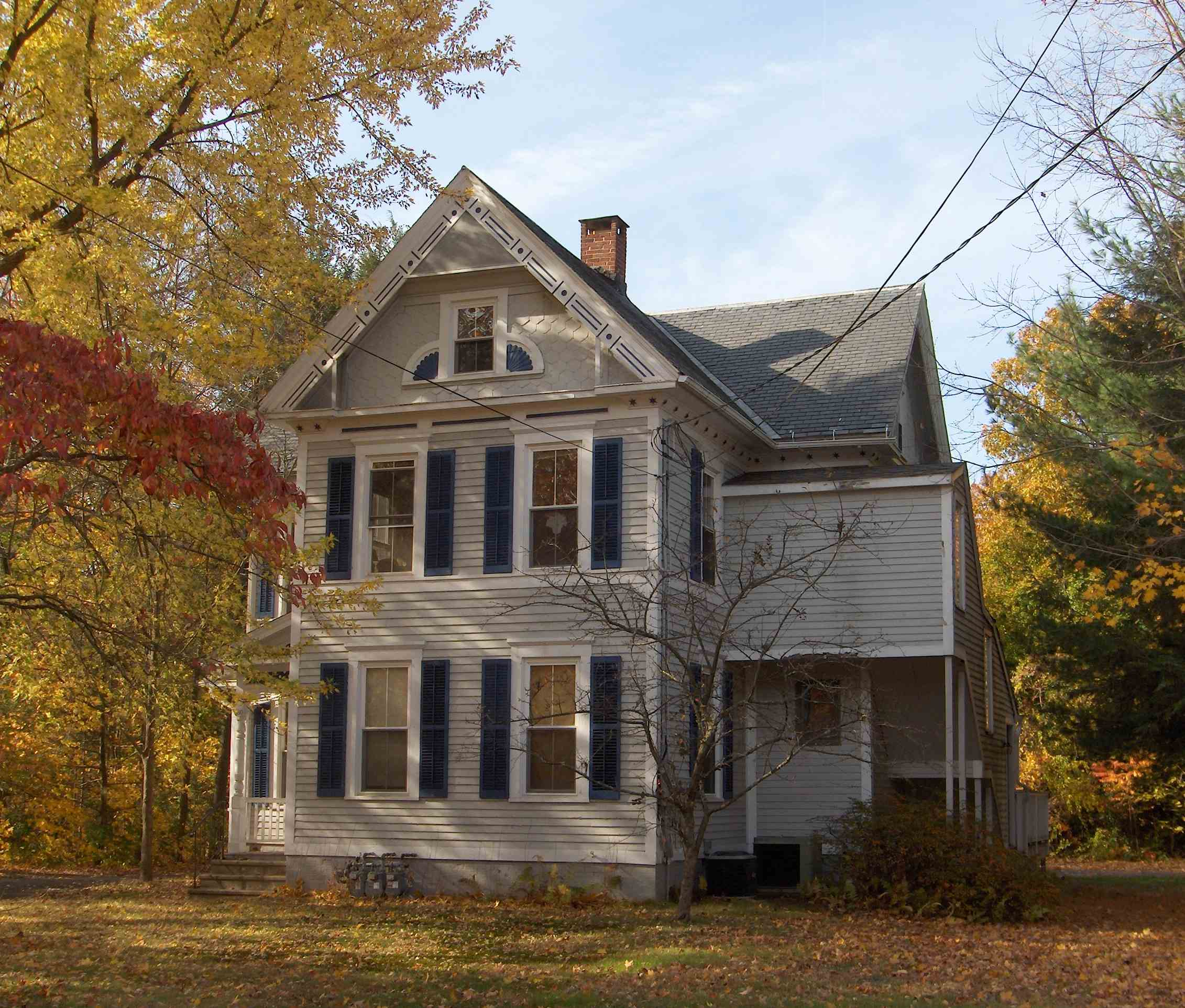
Byron & Ann Eliza Twiss House

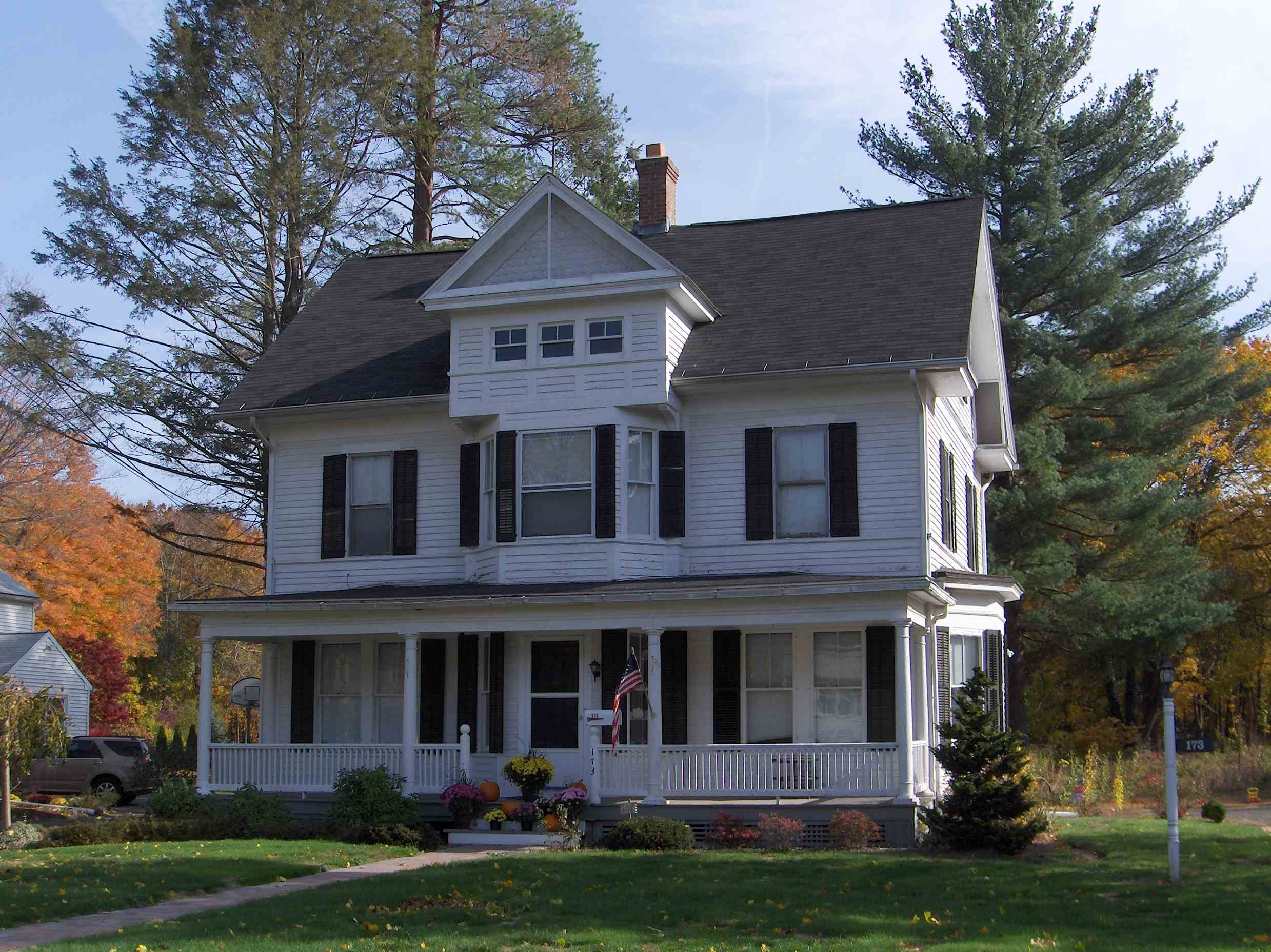
173 Meriden Avenue

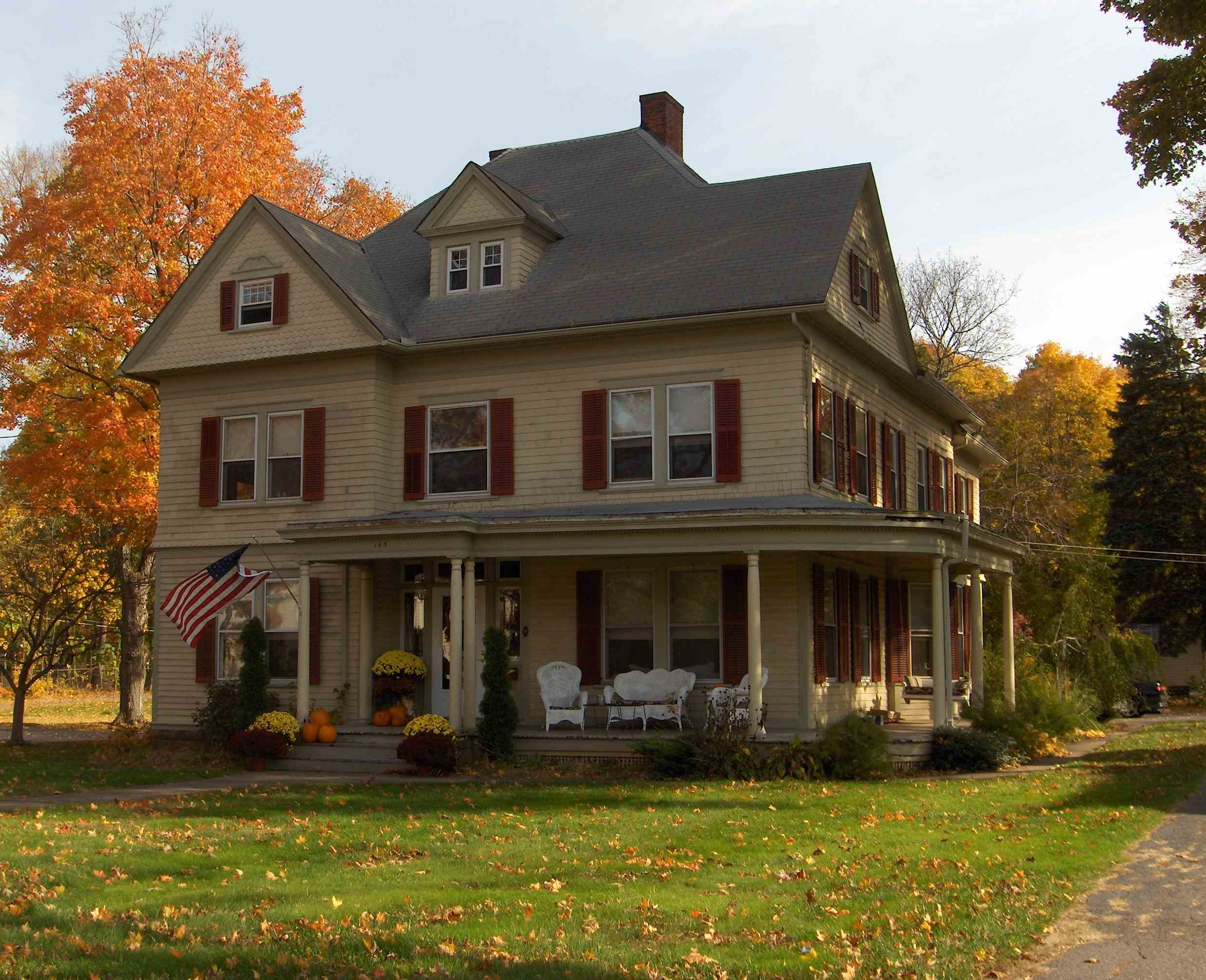
Moses W. Beckley House

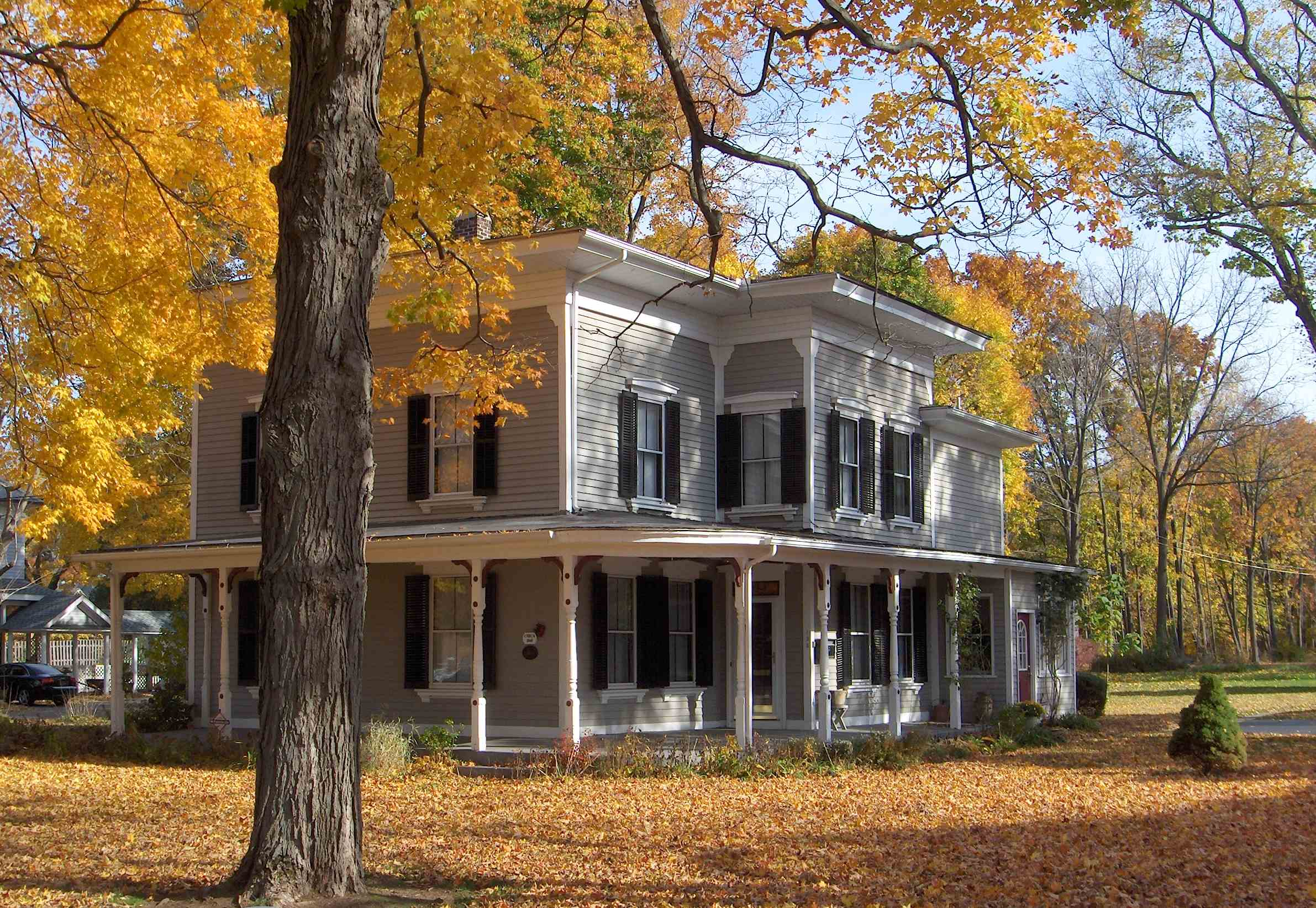
133 Meriden Avenue

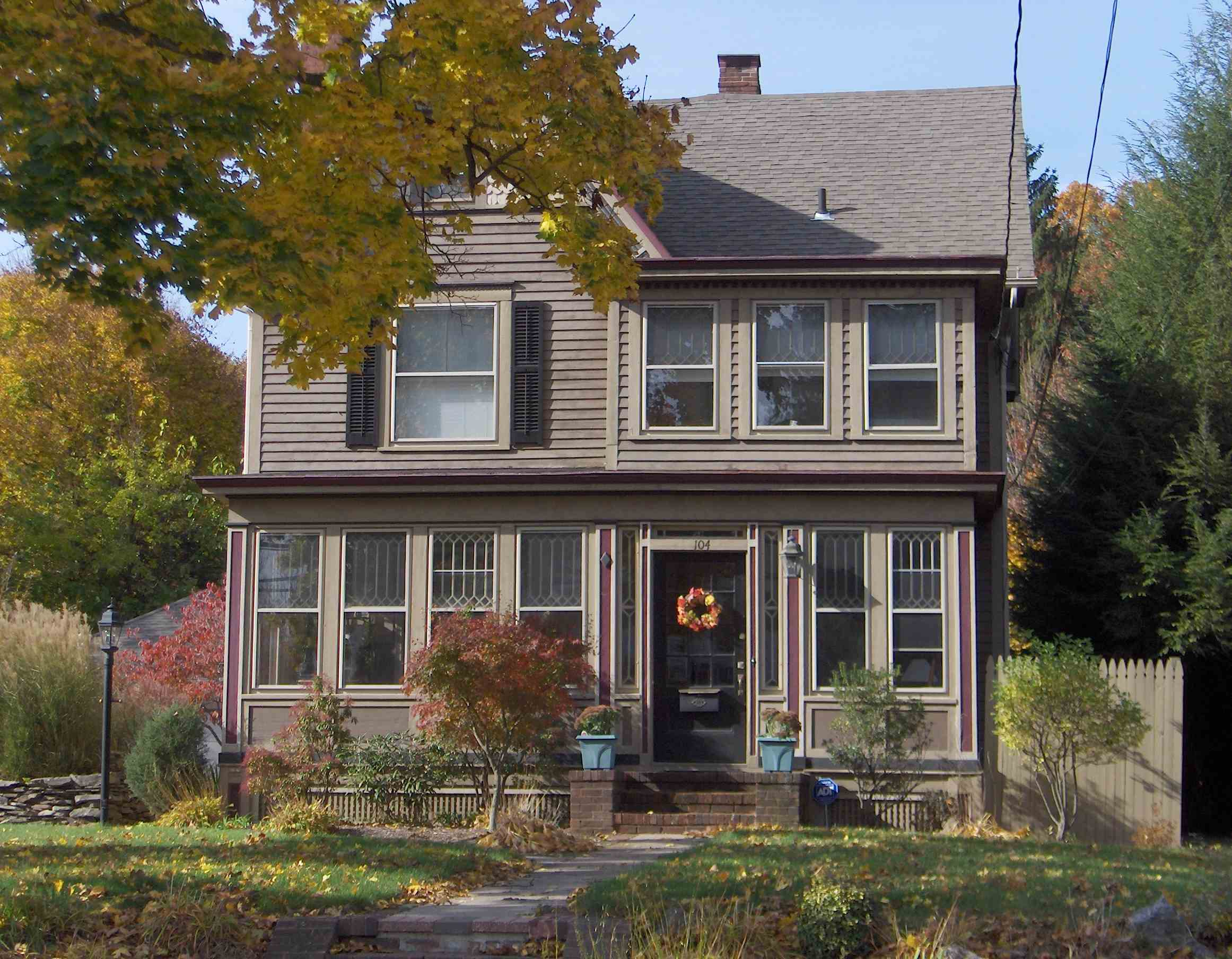
104 Meriden Avenue

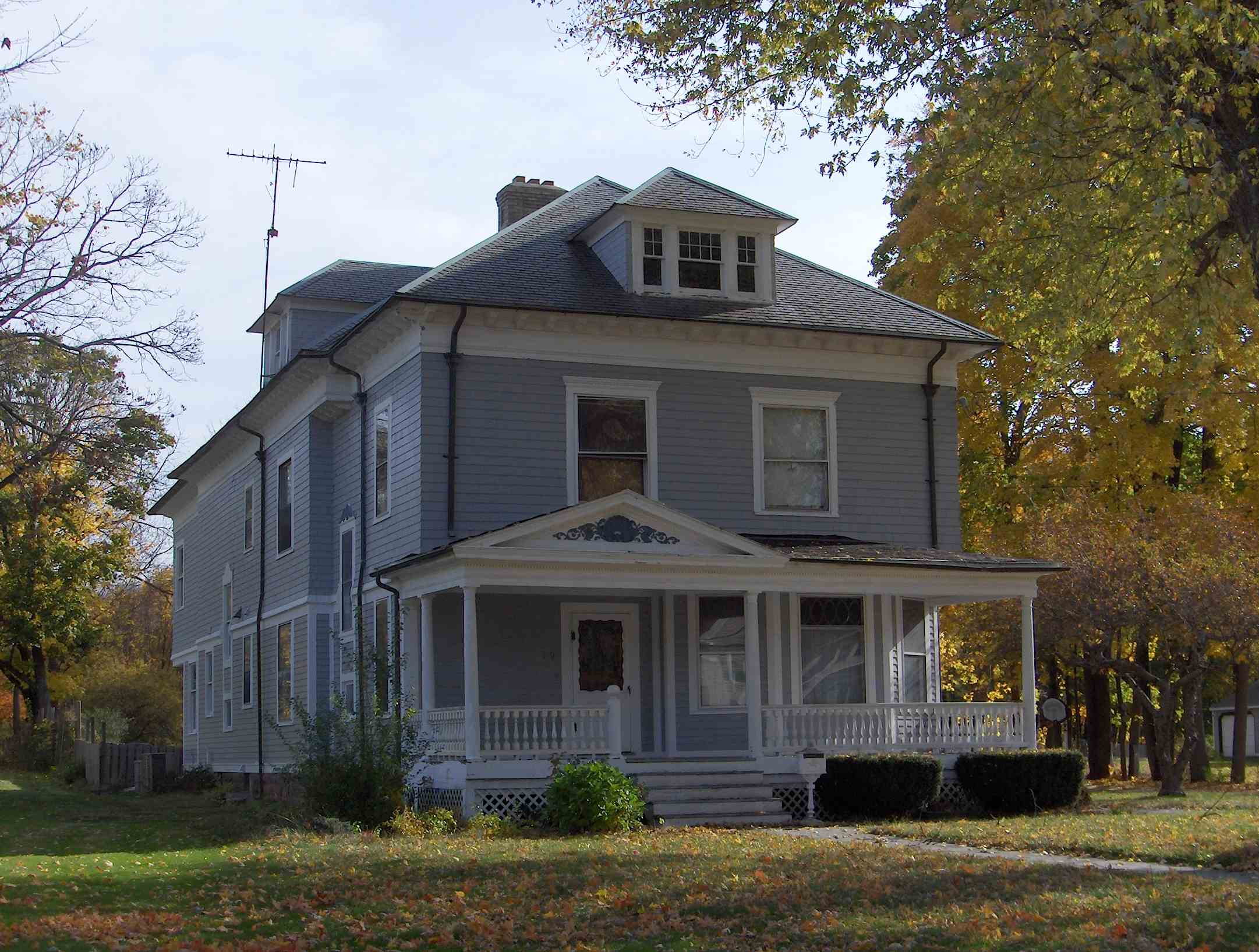
J. Frank Pratt House

== See also ==
- National Register of Historic Places listings in Southington, Connecticut
