= Hurwood Company =

- U.S. National Register of Historic Places
- U.S. Historic district – Contributing property
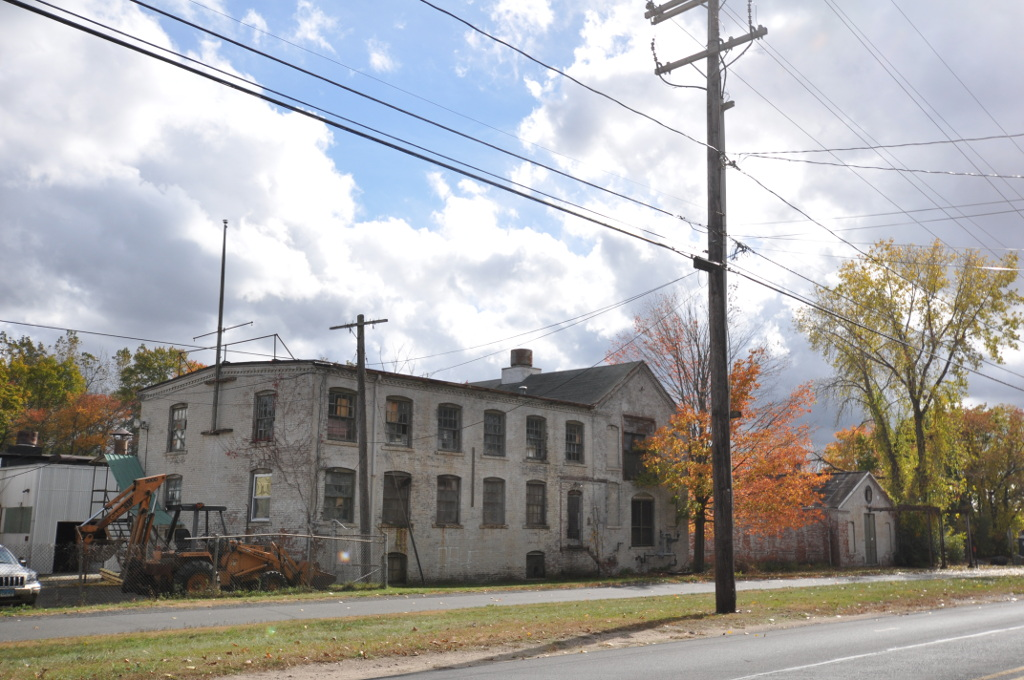

- Location within Connecticut Location within the United States
- Location: 379 Summer Street, Southington, Connecticut
- Coordinates: 41°35′22″N 72°53′26″W
- Area: 4.8 acres (1.9 ha)
- Built: 1885
- Architectural style: Industrial vernacular
- Part of: Plantsville Historic District (ID88002673)
- MPS: Historic Industrial Complexes of Southington TR
- NRHP reference No.: 88002681

Significant dates
- Added to NRHP: December 8, 1988
- Designated CP: December 1, 1988

The Hurwood Company is a historic industrial complex at 379 Summer Street in Southington, Connecticut. Built beginning sometime before 1884, this complex of mainly brick buildings is typical of the town's industrial landscape of the late 19th and early 20th centuries, and was where solid-headed screwdrivers were first manufactured. The complex was listed on the National Register of Historic Places in 1988.

== Description and history ==
The Hurwood Company complex is located north of the village center of Plantsville, on the east side of Summer Street near its junction with Cowles Street. It is separated from Summer Street by the Farmington Canal Heritage Trail, a former railroad right-of-way. Set on over 4 acres (1.6 ha) of land is a complex of more than a dozen interconnected structures. Set perpendicular to the street are two brick buildings, the left one two stories in height and the right one one story tall. Attached to the left one at a right angle to its rear corner is a large steel forge shed with a monitor roof. Each of these buildings is encrusted with small buildings, and they are joined near the rear by a more modern structure.

The oldest buildings of this complex, the two brick buildings, were standing here by 1885, and were probably built by the Connecticut Motor Company, a maker of electric motors. In 1901, George Wood and John Hurley began production of solid-headed screwdrivers here; their company was purchased by Stanley Tools in 1905, continuing operations in the left brick building to make screwdrivers and chisels through the first half of the 20th century. The large forge building was added about 1915. The right brick building became part of Thompson Drop Forge, another local manufacturer. Industrial facilities of this type once dotted Southington's landscape, and are now becoming increasingly rare.

== See also ==
- National Register of Historic Places listings in Southington, Connecticut
