= Roswell Moore II House =

Historic house in Connecticut, United States

- U.S. National Register of Historic Places
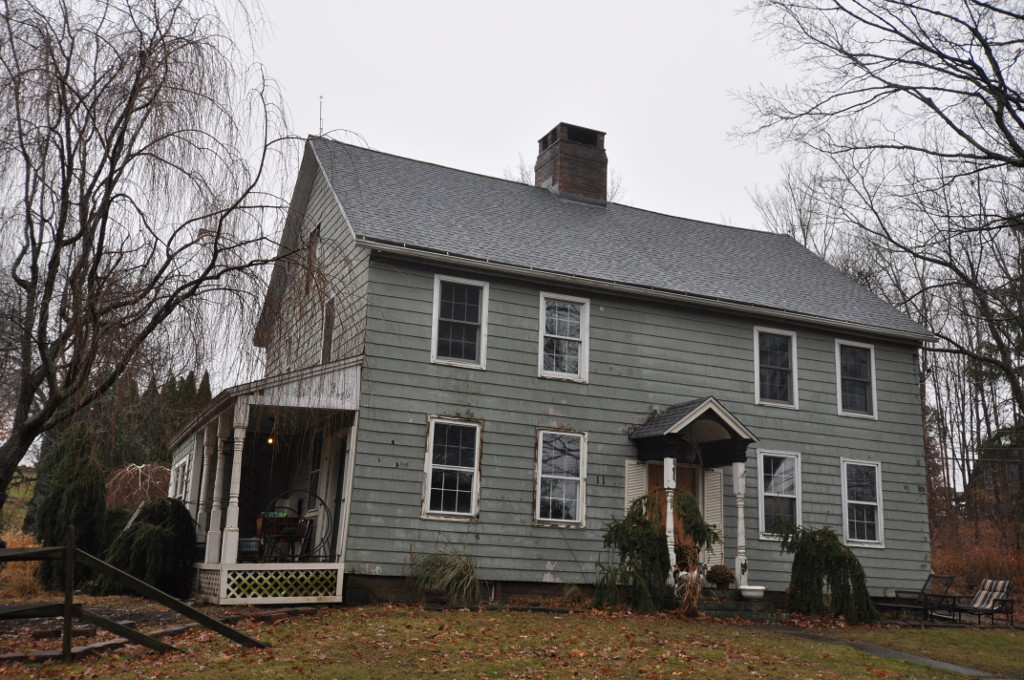

- Location within Connecticut Location within the United States
- Location: 1166 Andrews Street, Southington, Connecticut
- Coordinates: 41°37′23″N 72°49′50″W
- Area: 3 acres (1.2 ha)
- Built: 1787
- Architectural style: Colonial, New England Colonial
- MPS: Colonial Houses of Southington TR
- NRHP reference No.: 88003093
- Added to NRHP: July 1, 2005

The Roswell Moore II House is a historic house at 1166 Andrews Street in Southington, Connecticut. Built around 1787, it is one of a small number of surviving 18th-century houses in the town, and is a well-preserved example of Georgian architecture. It was listed on the National Register of Historic Places in 2005.

== Description and history ==
The Roswell Moore II House is located in a rural-residential setting of northeastern Southington, on the west side of Andrews Street overlooking Wassell Reservoir. It is a 2 1/2-story wood-frame structure, with a side-gable roof, central chimney, and clapboarded exterior. It rests on a foundation of ashlar cut brownstone. The main facade is five bays wide, with a center entrance topped by a half-round fanlight and sheltered by a 19th-century gabled hood. The interior retains some of its original period features, include carved wood paneling, fireplaces, and the winding front staircase. The house's chimney is also distinctive, largely made out of brownstone instead of the more usual brick.

The house was built by Roswell Moore II, the son of one of Southington's early settlers. It was probably built not long after his 1787 marriage. The house remained in the Moore family for three generations. Moore's son Sheldon was instrumental in the establishment of the cement industry in Southington.

== See also ==
- National Register of Historic Places listings in Southington, Connecticut
