= National Register of Historic Places listings in Southington, Connecticut =

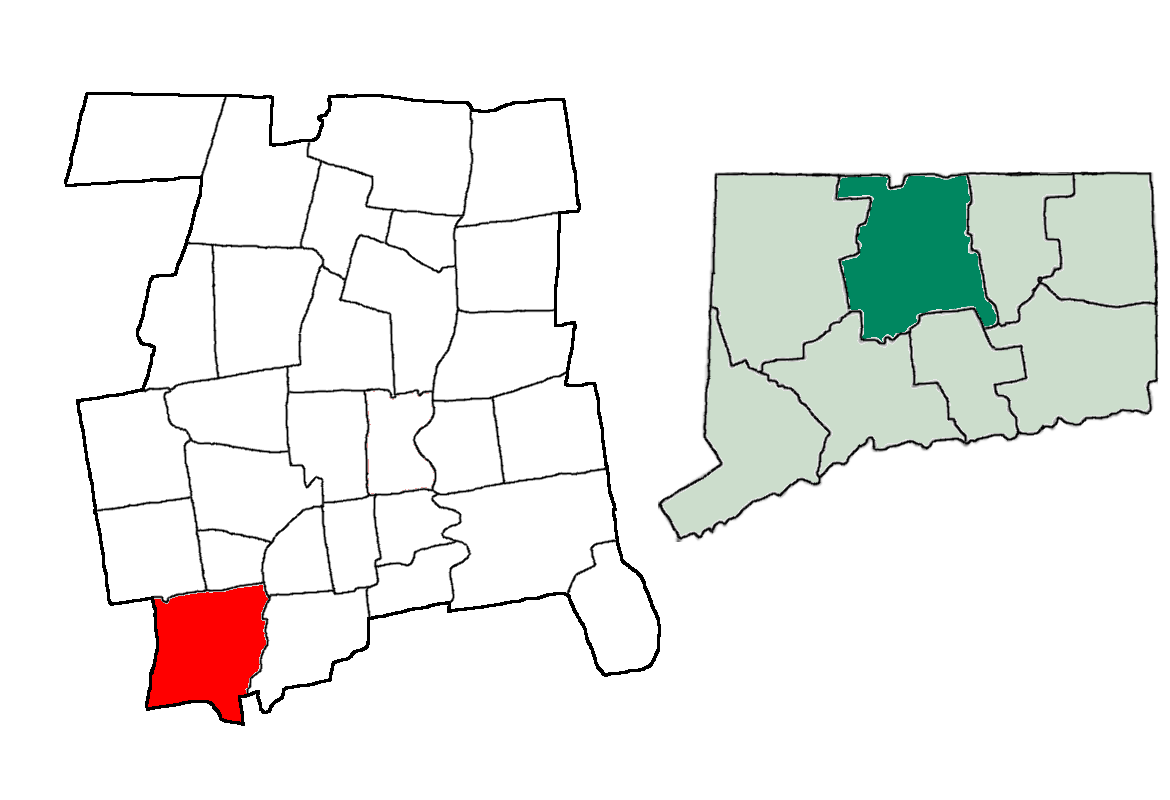
Location of Southington in Connecticut

This is a list of the National Register of Historic Places listings in Southington, Connecticut.

This is intended to be a complete list of the properties and districts on the National Register of Historic Places in Southington, Connecticut, United States. The locations of National Register properties and districts for which the latitude and longitude coordinates are included below, may be seen in various online maps.

There are more than 400 properties and districts listed on the National Register in Hartford County, including 21 National Historic Landmarks. The 41 properties and districts located in the town of Southington are listed below, while the properties and districts in the remaining parts of the county are listed separately. The Farmington Canal-New Haven and Northampton Canal, Hubbard Park, and the Marion Historic District extend into other communities in Hartford County and appear in both lists.

Twenty-five early houses in Southington were covered in a Multiple Property Submission study in 1988, and are indicated by asterisks (*) here.

Contents: Counties and municipalities in Connecticut

Fairfield (city of Bridgeport | town of Greenwich | city of Stamford) | Hartford (city of Hartford | town of Southington | town of West Hartford | town of Windsor) | Litchfield | Middlesex (city of Middletown) | New Haven (city of New Haven) | New London | Tolland | Windham

This National Park Service list is complete through NPS recent listings posted April 3, 2026.

== Current listings ==
Addresses are "Southington, CT" unless otherwise indicated.

	Name on the Register	Image	Date listed	Location	Village	Description
1	Luman Andrews House	Luman Andrews House	January 19, 1989 (#88003095)	469 Andrews Street; 41°36′19″N 72°49′43″W		Colonial house built in 1745; property is also important as location where volcanic rock suited for Portland cement was discovered.*
2	Atwater Manufacturing Company	Atwater Manufacturing Company	December 8, 1988 (#88002678)	335 Atwater Street; 41°34′43″N 72°53′54″W	Plantsville	
3	Selah Barnes House	Selah Barnes House	January 19, 1989 (#88003114)	282 Prospect Street; 41°35′29″N 72°54′01″W	Plantsville	
4	Barnes-Frost House	Barnes-Frost House	January 19, 1989 (#88003109)	1177 Marion Avenue; 41°33′56″N 72°55′31″W	Marion	Built in 1795, significant in part as it is a preserved example of Colonial architecture, and also because it was home of the Barnes and Frost families. The house shows a "high-style Federal embellishment", namely a "diamond and ellipse frieze band pattern".*
5	Blakeslee Forging Company	Blakeslee Forging Company	December 8, 1988 (#88002676)	100 West Main Street; 41°35′12″N 72°53′35″W	Plantsville	
6	Icabod Bradley House	Icabod Bradley House	July 28, 1989 (#88003115)	537 Shuttle Meadow Road; 41°38′55″N 72°50′40″W		
7	Clark Brothers Factory No. 1	Clark Brothers Factory No. 1	December 8, 1988 (#88002679)	1331 South Main Street; 41°34′15″N 72°53′47″W	Milldale	Demolished.
8	Clark Brothers Factory No. 2	Clark Brothers Factory No. 2	December 8, 1988 (#88002680)	409 Canal Street; 41°34′03″N 72°54′09″W	Milldale	
9	Avery Clark House	Avery Clark House	January 19, 1989 (#88003110)	1460 Meriden Avenue; 41°33′48″N 72°51′12″W		
10	Capt. Josiah Cowles House	Capt. Josiah Cowles House	January 19, 1989 (#88003102)	184 Marion Avenue; 41°35′05″N 72°54′12″W	Plantsville	Residence, c. 1750, of an early settler, who was born in Farmington, Connecticut on November 20, 1713. Cowles was a justice of the peace and a captain in the local militia. He held a number of town offices, and was viewed as a leading man in town. At the very first town meeting after the incorporation of Southington, held November 11, 1779, the residents appointed Cowles, along with Jonathan Root to a committee to "provide for the families of officers and soldiers in the field." In 1774, Cowles was appointed to a committee to deliver provisions to Boston, in response to the British blockade of Boston harbor.
11	Ebenezer Evans House	Ebenezer Evans House	January 19, 1989 (#88003101)	17 Long Bottom Road; 41°37′50″N 72°50′03″W		
12	Farmington Canal-New Haven and Northampton Canal	Farmington Canal-New Haven and Northampton Canal	September 12, 1985 (#85002664)	Roughly from Suffield in Hartford County to New Haven in New Haven County; 41°36′00″N 72°53′00″W		First a canal, later a railroad, and now a multi-use trail.
13	Levi B. Frost House	Levi B. Frost House	November 20, 1987 (#87002037)	1089 Marion Avenue; 41°34′05″N 72°55′29″W	Marion	Also known as the Asa Barnes Tavern.
14	Stephen Grannis House	Stephen Grannis House	January 19, 1989 (#88003119)	1193 West Street; 41°37′14″N 72°53′58″W		Demolished.
15	Timothy Hart House	Timothy Hart House	January 19, 1989 (#88003100)	521 Flanders Road; 41°37′09″N 72°50′43″W		
16	House at 1010 Shuttle Meadow Road	House at 1010 Shuttle Meadow Road	January 19, 1989 (#88003116)	1010 Shuttle Meadow Road; 41°38′58″N 72°51′12″W		
17	House at 590 West Street	House at 590 West Street	January 19, 1989 (#88003118)	590 West Street; 41°36′16″N 72°53′57″W		
18	Hubbard Park	Hubbard Park	December 15, 1997 (#97001466)	Roughly bounded by West Main Street, Interstate 691, CT 66, Reservoir Avenue, Edgewood Drive; 41°33′45″N 72°50′05″W		A park partly in Southington, Meriden, and partly in Berlin.
19	Hurwood Company	Hurwood Company	December 8, 1988 (#88002681)	379 Summer Street; 41°35′22″N 72°53′26″W	Plantsville	
20	Lake Compounce Carousel	Lake Compounce Carousel	December 12, 1978 (#78002865)	Lake Compounce Amusement Park; 41°38′21″N 72°55′22″W		
21	Marion Historic District	Marion Historic District	December 21, 1988 (#88001423)	Along Marion Avenue and Meriden-Waterbury Turnpike, in the town of Southington and in the town of Cheshire (in New Haven County); 41°33′50″N 72°55′29″W		Highlights of the district include the Levi B. Frost House, the Barnes-Frost House, the Miles Upson House, and the Lester Beecher House. Extends into Cheshire; see the New Haven County list.
22	Meriden Avenue-Oakland Road Historic District	Meriden Avenue-Oakland Road Historic District	May 25, 1988 (#88000580)	Roughly Oakland Road between Meriden and Berlin Avenues, and Meriden Avenue between Oakland Road and Delhunty Drive; 41°35′31″N 72°52′26″W		
23	Roswell Moore II House	Roswell Moore II House	July 1, 2005 (#88003093)	1166 Andrews Street; 41°37′23″N 72°49′50″W		
24	Peck, Stow & Wilcox Factory	Peck, Stow & Wilcox Factory	December 8, 1988 (#88002682)	217 Center Street; 41°36′08″N 72°52′59″W		Demolished.
25	Plantsville Historic District	Plantsville Historic District	December 1, 1988 (#88002673)	Roughly bounded by Prospect Street, Summer Street, the Quinnipiac River, Grove Street, South Main Street, West Main Street, and West Street; 41°35′26″N 72°53′35″W		
26	Dr. J. Porter House	Dr. J. Porter House	January 19, 1989 (#88003096)	391 Belleview Avenue; 41°35′05″N 72°52′07″W		
27	Pultz & Walkley Company	Pultz & Walkley Company	December 8, 1988 (#88002677)	120 West Main Street; 41°35′12″N 72°53′34″W	Plantsville	
28	Jonathan Root House	Jonathan Root House	January 19, 1989 (#88003113)	140-142 North Main Street; 41°36′16″N 72°52′43″W		
29	Dr. Henry Skelton House	Dr. Henry Skelton House	January 19, 1989 (#88003117)	889 South Main Street; 41°35′02″N 72°53′32″W		
30	H. D. Smith Company Building	H. D. Smith Company Building	September 19, 1977 (#77001420)	24 West Street; 41°35′19″N 72°53′56″W	Plantsville	
31	Southington Center Historic District	Southington Center Historic District	May 8, 1989 (#88002961)	Roughly North Main Street North from Vermont Avenue, and Berlin Street from Main Street to Academy Lane; 41°36′12″N 72°52′41″W		
32	Southington Public Library	Southington Public Library	February 9, 1989 (#89000015)	239 Main Street in Southington Center; 41°35′48″N 72°52′41″W		Building now houses the local historical society.
33	Horace Webster Farmhouse	Horace Webster Farmhouse	August 24, 1977 (#77001417)	577 South End Road; 41°34′01″N 72°52′27″W	Plantsville	
34	West Street School	West Street School	December 1, 1988 (#88002689)	1432 West Street; 41°37′39″N 72°54′03″W		
35	Rev. John Wightman House	Rev. John Wightman House	January 19, 1989 (#88003111)	1024 Mount Vernon Road; 41°35′56″N 72°55′32″W		
36	Valentine Wightman House	Valentine Wightman House	January 19, 1989 (#88003112)	1112 Mount Vernon Road; 41°36′04″N 72°55′32″W		Probably demolished.
37	Woodruff House	Woodruff House	January 19, 1989 (#88003097)	377 Berlin Street; 41°35′49″N 72°51′21″W		
38	Capt. Samuel Woodruff House	Capt. Samuel Woodruff House	May 5, 1989 (#89000014)	23 Old State Road; 41°35′53″N 72°50′49″W		
39	Ezekiel Woodruff House	Ezekiel Woodruff House	January 19, 1989 (#88003099)	1152 East Street; 41°35′41″N 72°50′32″W		
40	Jotham Woodruff House	Jotham Woodruff House	January 19, 1989 (#88003120)	11 Alyssa Court; 41°36′07″N 72°52′13″W		
41	Urbana Woodruff House	Urbana Woodruff House	January 19, 1989 (#88003098)	1096 East Street; 41°35′37″N 72°50′31″W		

== See also ==
- List of National Historic Landmarks in Connecticut
- National Register of Historic Places listings in Connecticut
