= Avery Clark House =

Historic house in Connecticut, United States

- U.S. National Register of Historic Places
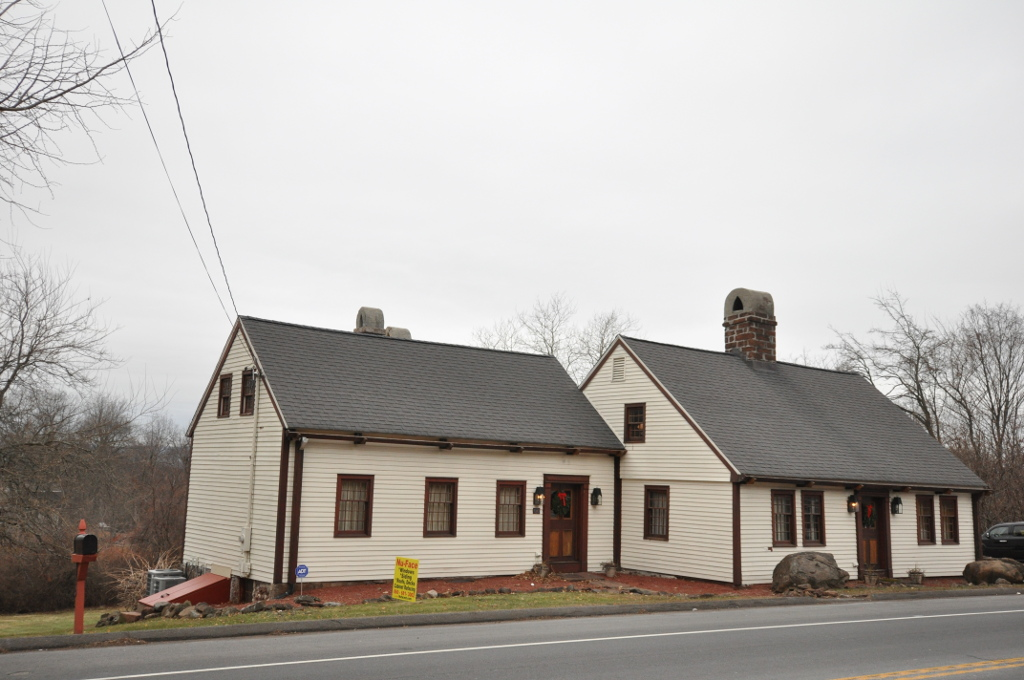

- Location within Connecticut Location within the United States
- Location: 1460 Meriden Avenue, Southington, Connecticut
- Coordinates: 41°33′48″N 72°51′12″W
- Area: 1 acre (0.40 ha)
- Built: 1792
- Architectural style: Colonial, New England Colonial
- MPS: Colonial Houses of Southington TR
- NRHP reference No.: 88003110
- Added to NRHP: January 19, 1989

The Avery Clark House is a historic house at 1460 Meriden Avenue in Southington, Connecticut. Built about 1792, it is one of the town's surviving 18th-century houses, and well-preserved example of late Georgian vernacular architecture. It was listed on the National Register of Historic Places in 1989.

== Description and history ==
The Avery Clark House stands on the west side of Meriden Avenue (Connecticut Route 120), a busy through street in southeastern Southington. It is a single-story wood-frame structure, set close to the road. It is covered by a gabled roof that is more steeply pitched than is typical for the period, and has a central chimney. The roof also extends slightly beyond the first floor on all four sides. The main facade is five bays wide, with a center entrance. A single-story wing, four bays wide, extends northward at a recess. It also has a central chimney, and a secondary entrance in the rightmost bay. Period interior features include three original fireplaces.

The house was built about 1792. It was built for Avery and Anna Walkley Clark, who came to Southington from Durham. The house was owned by five generations of Clark descendants. Twentieth-century updates to the house include new windows and doors, and it is probable that the chimneys are not original.

== See also ==
- National Register of Historic Places listings in Southington, Connecticut
