= Selah Barnes House =

Historic house in Connecticut, United States

- U.S. National Register of Historic Places
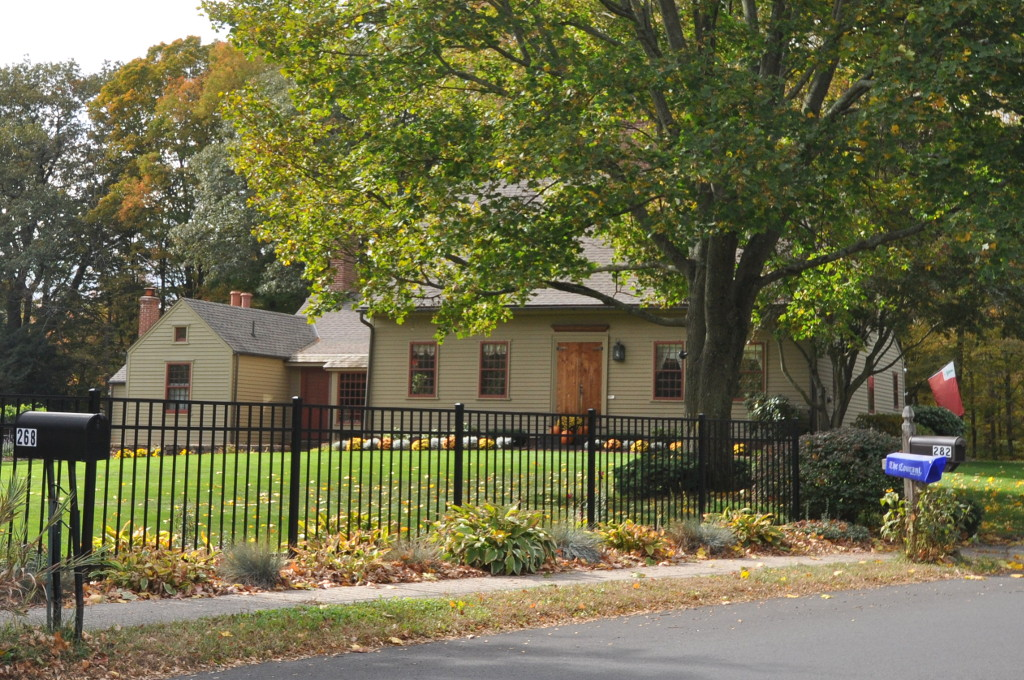

- Location within Connecticut Location within the United States
- Location: 282 Prospect Street, Southington, Connecticut
- Coordinates: 41°35′29″N 72°54′1″W
- Area: 2.1 acres (0.85 ha)
- Built: 1778
- MPS: Colonial Houses of Southington TR
- NRHP reference No.: 88003114
- Added to NRHP: January 19, 1989

The Selah Barnes House is a historic house at 282 Prospect Street Southington, Connecticut. Built about 1778 for a local merchant, it is a good local example of vernacular Georgian architecture. It was listed on the National Register of Historic Places in 1989.

== Description and history ==
The Selah Barnes House is located in Southington's Plantsville area, on the south side of Prospect Street opposite its junction with Ashwell Drive. It is set facing east on about 2 acres (0.81 ha) of land that fronts on the Eightmile River to the west. The house is a 1 1/2-story wood-frame structure, with a side-gable roof, central chimney, and stone foundation. The roof gable is relatively broad, with a shallow-pitch section to the rear giving the house a variant of a classical saltbox profile. Its main facade is five bays wide, with a central entrance framed by simple molding with a dentillated lintel. Windows are generally 12-over-12 sash.

The house was built about 1778 for Selah Barnes, a local merchant who shipped cornmeal to the West Indies. Barnes was the son of Asa Barnes, who owned a tavern in the town. The house's architecture differs from others in the area from the same period, in that its front eave is deeper than typical, and because its clapboarding is nailed directly to the studs. Its chimney is also not as massive as most period chimneys, and is taller.

== See also ==
- National Register of Historic Places listings in Southington, Connecticut
