= Ebenezer Evans House =

Historic house in Connecticut, United States

- U.S. National Register of Historic Places
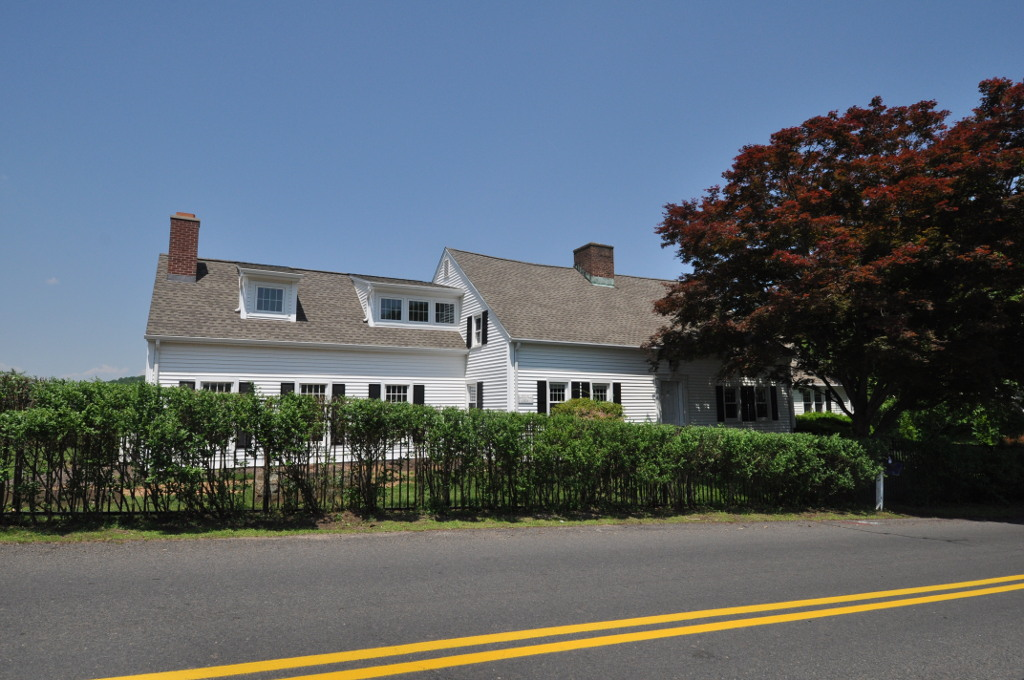

- Location within Connecticut Location within the United States
- Location: 17 Long Bottom Road, Southington, Connecticut
- Coordinates: 41°37′50″N 72°50′3″W
- Area: 3 acres (1.2 ha)
- Built: 1767
- Architectural style: Colonial, New England Colonial
- MPS: Colonial Houses of Southington TR
- NRHP reference No.: 88003101
- Added to NRHP: January 19, 1989

The Ebenezer Evans House is a historic house at 17 Long Bottom Road in Southington, Connecticut. Built about 1767, it is a well-preserved example of a Georgian Cape house. It was listed on the National Register of Historic Places in 1989.

== Description and history ==
The Ebenezer Evans House stands in a rural area of northeastern Southington, on the north side of Long Bottom Road just west of its junction with Andrews Street. It is a single-story wood-frame structure, with a side gable roof, central chimney, clapboarded exterior, and stone foundation. Its main block is five bays wide, with a center entrance framed by fluted pilasters and a plain entablature. A similarly styled modern ell extends to the main block's right at a recess. Windows are twelve-over-eight sash. The roof is set at a steeper pitch than is typical for Cape houses of the period, and the block is also slightly deeper.

The house was built about 1767 by Ebenezer Evans, who moved north to Conway, Massachusetts by 1782. A later owner was Anson Merriman, who was involved in early efforts to mine limestone in the area for use in portland cement. Merriman's descendants, mainly apple farmers, owned the property into the 20th century. (The present-day Rogers Orchard, located further up Long Bottom Road, is run by Merriman descendants.)

== See also ==
- National Register of Historic Places listings in Southington, Connecticut
