= House at 1010 Shuttle Meadow Road =

Historic house in Connecticut, United States

- U.S. National Register of Historic Places
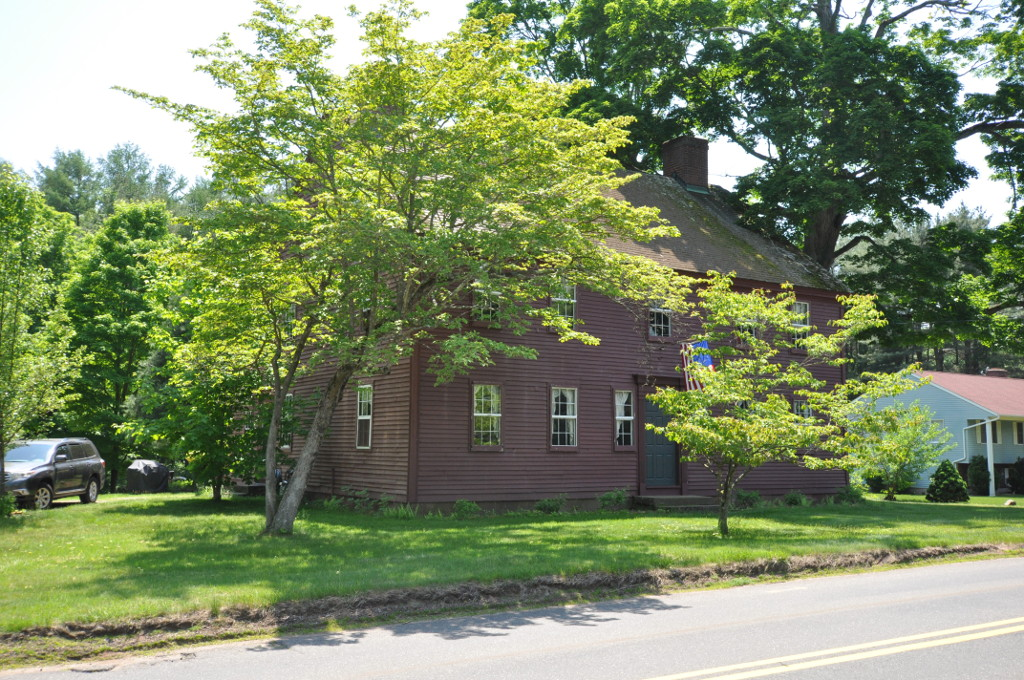

- Location within Connecticut Location within the United States
- Location: 1010 Shuttle Meadow Road, Southington, Connecticut
- Coordinates: 41°38′58″N 72°51′12″W
- Area: 1.9 acres (0.77 ha)
- Built: 1772
- Architectural style: Georgian
- MPS: Colonial Houses of Southington TR
- NRHP reference No.: 88003116
- Added to NRHP: January 19, 1989

1010 Shuttle Meadow Road is a historic house at 1010 Shuttle Meadow Road in Southington, Connecticut. Built about 1772, it is one of the town's few surviving 18th-century houses. It was listed on the National Register of Historic Places in 1989.

== Description and history ==
Shuttle Meadow Road is an east–west road in northern Southington, now residential in character and crossed in its western section by Interstate 84. Number 1010 is on the south side of the street, east of its junction with Dunham Street, and is set closer to the street than surrounding 20th-century development. It is a 2 1/2-story wood-frame structure, with a roof that is gabled at one end and hipped at the other, and a clapboarded exterior. It is set on a brownstone foundation, and as a brownstone front step. Its main facade is five bays wide, with the main entrance at the center, framed by fluted pilasters and a corniced entablature, and flanked by wide sidelight windows. The ground floor interior retains original wide floorboards and fireplaces.

The house was built about 1772. It is a well-preserved local example of Georgian architecture, with its most unusual distinctive feature being the double-wide sidelight windows.

== See also ==
- National Register of Historic Places listings in Southington, Connecticut
