= Atwater Manufacturing Company =

- U.S. National Register of Historic Places
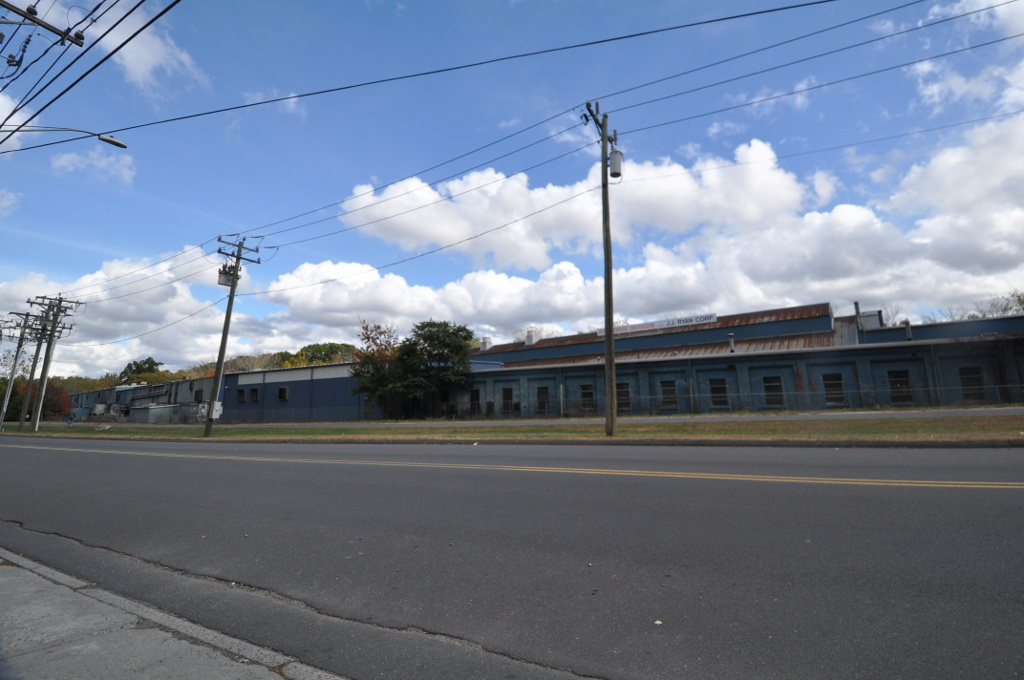

- Location within Connecticut Location within the United States
- Location: 335 Atwater Street, Southington, Connecticut
- Coordinates: 41°34′43″N 72°53′54″W
- Area: 6.5 acres (2.6 ha)
- Built: c. 1912
- Architectural style: Industrial vernacular
- MPS: Historic Industrial Complexes of Southington TR
- NRHP reference No.: 88002678
- Added to NRHP: December 8, 1988

The Atwater Manufacturing Company is a historic industrial property at 335 Atwater Street in Southington, Connecticut, United States. The company, founded in 1867 and now known as Rex Forge, has long been one of Southington's major industrial employers. The ten extant buildings of the complex date as far back as 1912, and are an important element of the town's industrial past. The property was listed on the National Register of Historic Places in 1988.

== Description and history ==
The Atwater Manufacturing Company plant is located in Southington's Plantsville area, on the east side of Atwater Street, just north of its junction with Canal Street. The roughly linear complex extends between the Quinnipiac River, which flows southward to its east, and a former railroad right-of-way (now a multiuse trail) that runs between it and Atwater Street. The area comprises ten buildings, with construction dates ranging from approximately 1912 to the 1980s. Most have an exterior finished in corrugated metal, although some of the oldest buildings have painted brick exteriors. Buildings range in height from one to two stories, with the main forge building the largest; it is covered by a gabled roof with a monitor at its upper level.

The site has a long industrial history, having been the location of Southington's first grist mill in 1767. Atwater Manufacturing was organized in 1869, and at first manufactured parts for carriages. In the 20th century it transitioned to the manufacture of parts for automobiles, and now as Rex Forge does custom metal forging.

== See also ==
- National Register of Historic Places listings in Southington, Connecticut
