= Dr. J. Porter House =

Historic house in Connecticut, United States

- U.S. National Register of Historic Places
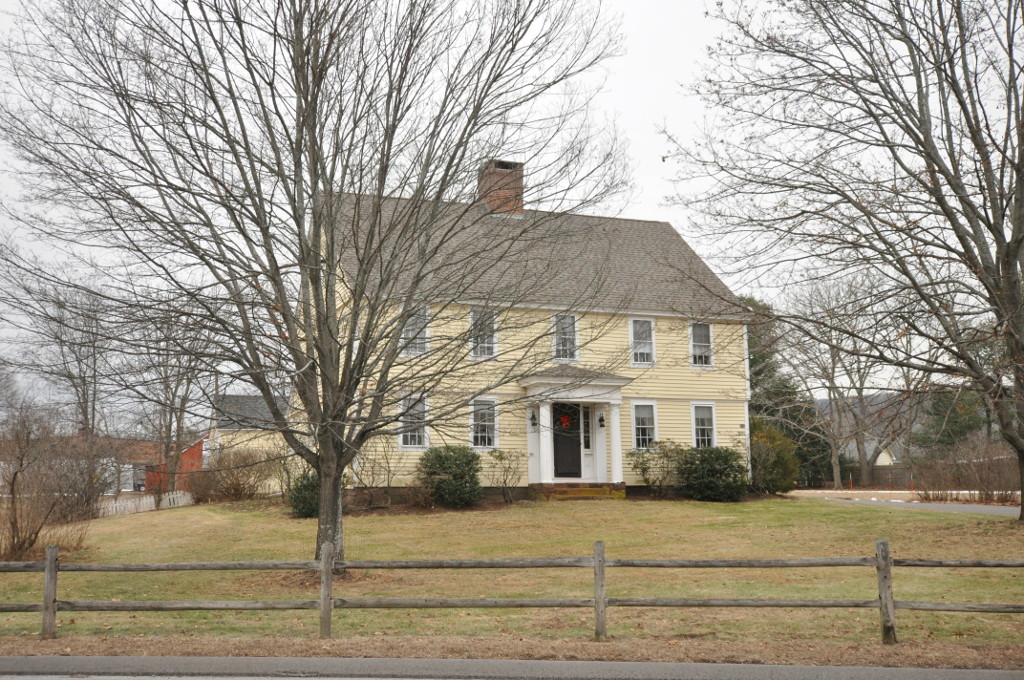

- Location within Connecticut Location within the United States
- Location: 391 Belleview Avenue, Southington, Connecticut
- Coordinates: 41°35′5″N 72°52′7″W
- Area: 3 acres (1.2 ha)
- Built: 1728
- Architectural style: Colonial, New England Colonial
- MPS: Colonial Houses of Southington TR
- NRHP reference No.: 88003096
- Added to NRHP: January 19, 1989

The Dr. J. Porter House is a historic house at 391 Belleview Avenue in Southington, Connecticut. Estimated to have been built about 1728, it is one of the town's few surviving 18th-century houses. It was home from 1754 home to one of the town's largest landowners. It was listed on the National Register of Historic Places in 1989.

== Description and history ==
The Dr. J. Porter House stands in what is now a rural-suburban area south of Southington center, on the east side of Belleview Avenue just east of its junction with Meriden Avenue. It is a 2 1/2-story wood-frame structure, with a side-gable roof, central chimney, and clapboarded exterior. It has a five-bay front facade, with the second floor projecting slightly beyond the first. The main entrance is at the center, flanked by sidelight windows and sheltered by a Greek Revival portico. The portico has fluted Doric columns rising to a plain entablature and a low-pitch hip roof. The interior retains a number of original features, including wide floorboards in some of its rooms, and four fireplaces, including one with a beehive oven. Also preserved is the original front staircase, a traditional colonial winding stair set in the front vestibule.

The house is estimated to have been built about 1728. It was purchased in 1754 by Dr. Joshua Porter at the time of his marriage; Porter was described as one of the town's largest landowners, and as a prominent owner of slaves. The Greek Revival portico is a 19th-century alteration.

== See also ==
- National Register of Historic Places listings in Southington, Connecticut
