= House at 590 West Street =

Historic house in Connecticut, United States

- U.S. National Register of Historic Places
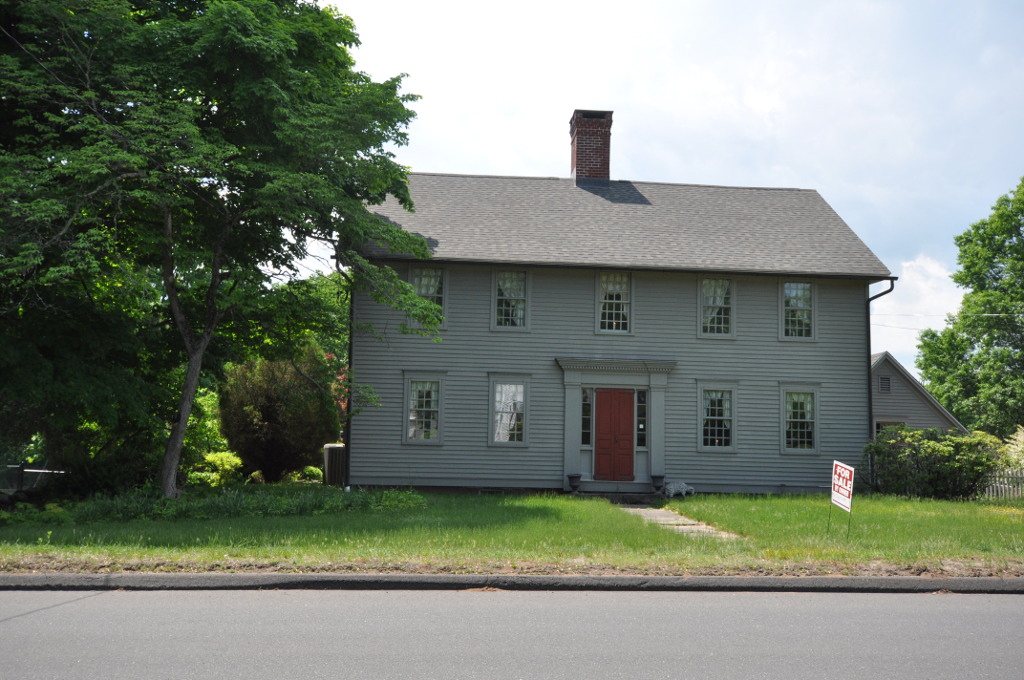

- Location within Connecticut Location within the United States
- Location: 590 West Street, Southington, Connecticut
- Coordinates: 41°36′16″N 72°53′57″W
- Area: 2 acres (0.81 ha)
- Built: 1790
- Architectural style: Colonial, New England Colonial
- MPS: Colonial Houses of Southington TR
- NRHP reference No.: 88003118
- Added to NRHP: January 19, 1989

590 West Street is a historic house in Southington, Connecticut. Built about 1790, it is one of the town's small number of surviving 18th-century houses, and a well-preserved example of Georgian colonial architecture. It was listed on the National Register in 1989.

== Description and history ==
West Street is a major north–south route on the west side of Southington, paralleling Interstate 84 which runs just to the west. Number 590 stands on the west side of the road, just south of its junction with Sunnybrook Hill Road. It is a 2 1/2-story wood-frame structure, with a side-gable roof, central chimney, and clapboarded exterior. It rests on a cut brownstone foundation. The main facade is five bays wide, with a center entrance flanked by sidelight windows and pilasters, and topped by an entablature and projecting cornice. Windows are rectangular sash, set in openings framed by corniced moulding. Ells extend to both the right side and rear of the main block; the right-side ell is modern, while the rear ell is possibly older than the main block. The interior of the house retains original period features, including wide flooring, doors with period hardware, and a narrow winding staircase in the front vestibule.

The house was built about 1790. It is locally significant as a surviving and well-preserved 18th-century house. Modifications at one time included a late 19th-century Victorian portico sheltering the main entrance; this has since been removed.

== See also ==
- National Register of Historic Places listings in Southington, Connecticut
