= Blakeslee Forging Company =

- U.S. National Register of Historic Places
- U.S. Historic district – Contributing property
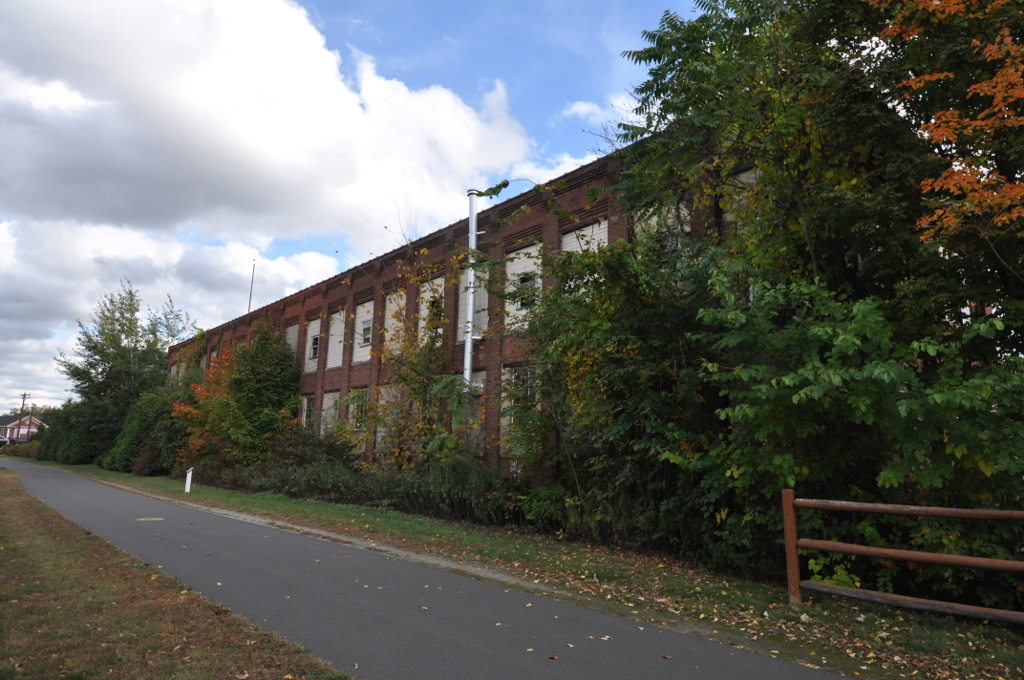

- Location within Connecticut Location within the United States
- Location: 100 West Main Street, Southington, Connecticut
- Coordinates: 41°35′12″N 72°53′35″W
- Area: 3.5 acres (1.4 ha)
- Built: 1912
- Architectural style: Colonial Revival
- Part of: Plantsville Historic District (ID88002673)
- MPS: Historic Industrial Complexes of Southington TR
- NRHP reference No.: 88002676

Significant dates
- Added to NRHP: December 8, 1988
- Designated CP: December 1, 1988

The Blakeslee Forging Company is a historic industrial complex at 100 West Main Street in the Plantsville area of Southington, Connecticut. The surviving six buildings, dating to about 1910 or later, were developed for a company founded in 1877 that specialized in drop forging. The buildings are well preserved structures typifying industrial buildings found in Southington from that era. The complex was listed on the National Register of Historic Places in 1988.

== Description and history ==
The Blakeslee Forging Company complex is located on the south side of the central village of Plantsville. It is set well back from the street, behind a municipal parking lot and the former Pultz & Walkley Company industrial complex. Its largest two buildings form a T, whose top runs parallel to the former railroad right-of-way that now serves as the Farmington Canal Heritage Trail. The top of the T is a two-story brick building, 20 bays long, with industrial Colonial Revival trim elements, while the leg of the T is a longer single-story brick structure with a gabled roof. Also facing the railroad right-of-way, north of those buildings, is a single-story six-bay brick building. Three smaller structures are tucked behind these, between the T and the adjacent buildings to the north.

The Blakeslee Forging Company was founded in 1877 and incorporated in 1896 by Sherman Blakeslee, and first operated in mainly wood-frame buildings built on this site by the Plantsville Manufacturing Company. The company manufactured parts for carriages, and provided custom drop-forging services. Most of the buildings in this complex date to 1912–14, when the older buildings were torn down.

== See also ==
- National Register of Historic Places listings in Southington, Connecticut
