= Icabod Bradley House =

Historic house in Connecticut, United States

- U.S. National Register of Historic Places
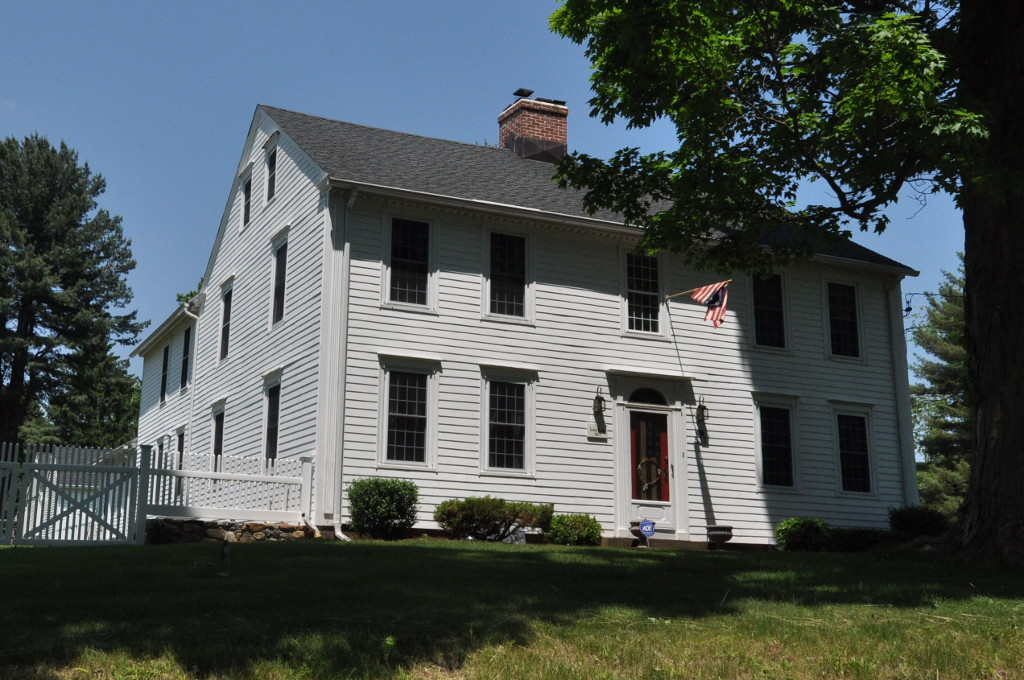

- Location within Connecticut Location within the United States
- Location: 537 Shuttle Meadow Road, Southington, Connecticut
- Coordinates: 41°38′55″N 72°50′40″W
- Area: 3 acres (1.2 ha)
- Built: 1813
- Architectural style: Colonial, Federal, New England Colonial
- MPS: Colonial Houses of Southington TR
- NRHP reference No.: 88003115
- Added to NRHP: July 28, 1989

The Icabod Bradley House is a historic building at 537 Shuttle Meadow Road in Southington, Connecticut. Built in 1813, it is a good local example of transitional Colonial-Federal architecture. It was listed on the National Register of Historic Places in 1989.

== Description and history ==
The Ichabod Bradley House stands in a rural-residential area of northeastern Southington, on the north side of Shuttle Meadow Road just west of the Plainville Reservoir. It is a 2 1/2-story wood-frame structure, with a side-gable roof, center chimney, and clapboarded exterior. Its main facade faces south, and is five bays wide. The ground-floor windows are topped by shallow cornices, while the second-floor windows butt against the eave. The main entrance is at the center, with flanking narrow fluted pilasters, and a half-round fanlight transom above, topped by a dentillated cap. The building corners also exhibit pilasters. A single-story addition extends the building to the rear, and the 3-acre (1.2 ha) property also includes a shed and garage, both from the 20th century.

The house is believed to have been built around 1813 by Ichabod Bradley, a successful farmer in northeastern Southington. The basic plan of the house is Colonial in style, but the door surround and other trim elements are distinctly Federal in style. Bradley was the father of Amon Bradley, a leading figure of civic and business leadership in Southington in the mid-19th century.

== See also ==
- National Register of Historic Places listings in Southington, Connecticut
