= Horace Webster Farmhouse =

Historic house in Connecticut, United States

- U.S. National Register of Historic Places
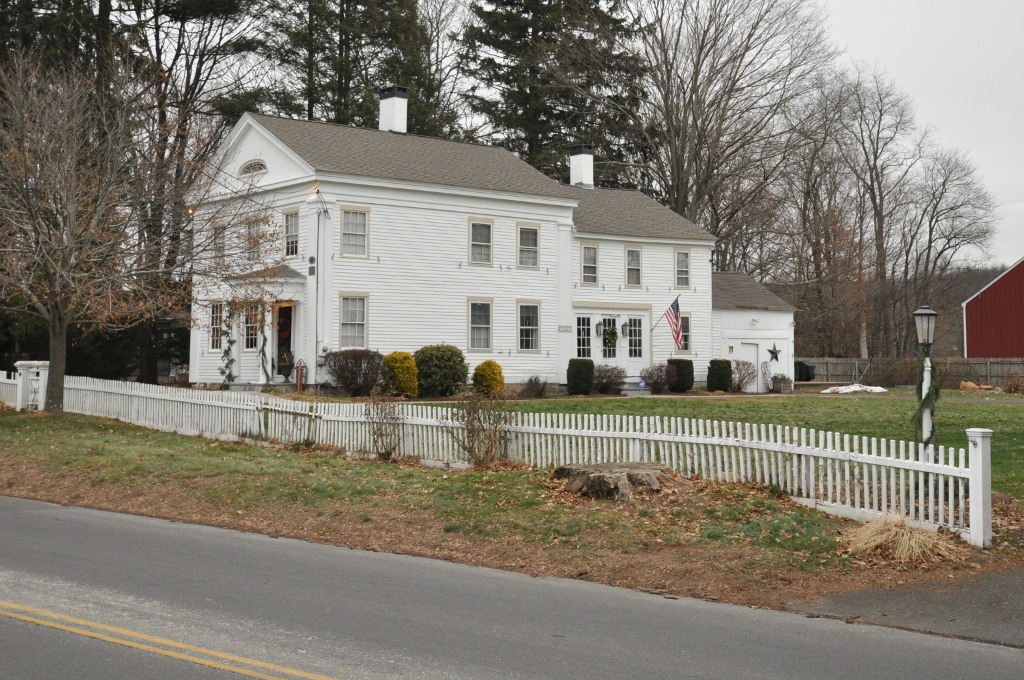

- Location within Connecticut Location within the United States
- Location: 577 South End Road, Southington, Connecticut
- Coordinates: 41°34′1″N 72°52′27″W
- Area: 1 acre (0.40 ha)
- Built: 1837
- Architectural style: Greek Revival
- NRHP reference No.: 77001417
- Added to NRHP: August 24, 1977

The Horace Webster Farmhouse is a historic house at 577 South End Road in Southington, Connecticut. Built about 1837, it is the town's only surviving example of a three-bay Greek Revival house. It was listed on the National Register of Historic Places in 1977.

== Description and history ==
The Horace Webster Farmhouse is located in southeastern Southington, on the east side of South End Road just north of the Southington Country Club. It is a 2 1/2-story wood-frame structure, with a gabled roof and clapboarded exterior. It has a three bay front facade, with broad corner pilasters of the Doric order rising to an entablature and fully pedimented gable. A semi-oval window is set in the center of the gable. The main entrance is in the rightmost bay, sheltered by a hip-roof portico supported by fluted Doric columns. The door is framed by sidelight and transom windows with leaded lights. A two-story ell extends to the rear of the main block, with a shed/garage beyond. The interior is not as sophisticated as the exterior, with a modest open staircase and cast iron fireplace surrounds.

Horace Webster, a descendant of early Connecticut governor John Webster, purchased the land for this house in 1835, which then included the adjacent country club land as farmland. He moved an older house (demolished in 1975) to make way for this house, which was completed about 1937. Webster operated a beef farm and shoe shop, and moved away in 1863. The property remained in the family until 1922. The land for the golf course was leased in the 1920s and eventually sold.

== See also ==
- National Register of Historic Places listings in Southington, Connecticut
