= Luman Andrews House =

Historic house in Connecticut, United States

- U.S. National Register of Historic Places
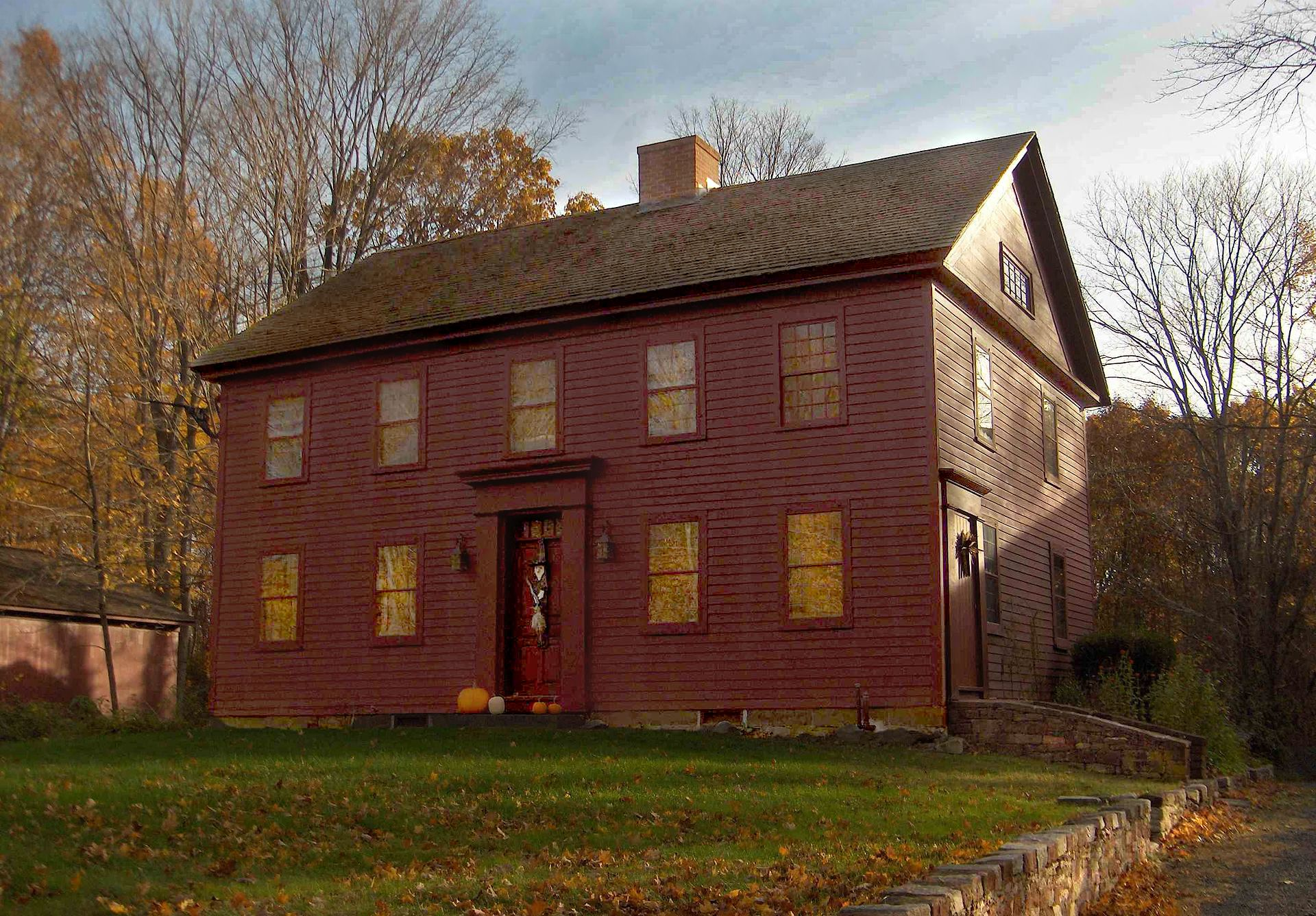

- Location within Connecticut Location within the United States
- Location: 469 Andrews Street, Southington, Connecticut
- Coordinates: 41°36′19″N 72°49′43″W
- Area: 1.8 acres (0.73 ha)
- Built: 1745
- Architectural style: Greek Revival, Colonial, New England Colonial
- MPS: Colonial Houses of Southington TR
- NRHP reference No.: 88003095
- Added to NRHP: January 19, 1989

The Luman Andrews House is a historic house at 469 Andrews Street in Southington, Connecticut. Built in 1745, it is one of the oldest houses in Southington. Its property was also the site of the early manufacture of hydraulic cement. The 1.8-acre (0.73 ha) property was listed on the National Register of Historic Places in 1989.

== Description and history ==
The Luman Andrews House stands in a rural area of central eastern Southington, on the east side of Andrews Street just south of its junction with Woodruff Street. It is a 2 1/2-story wood-frame structure, with a side-gable roof, central chimney, and clapboarded exterior. Its main facade is five bays wide, with a center entrance topped by a four-light transom window and framed by a Greek Revival surround with pilasters and a corniced entablature. The side gable ends have also been fully pedimented in another Greek Revival alteration. The property also includes the remains of a 19th-century lime kiln. A quarry on the site was the source of volcanic rock used in Portland cement during the 1830s and 1840s.

The house was built in 1745 by Nathaniel Messenger with just four bays, and was enlarged by its fifth bay in 1795 by Eunice Judd Root. In 1818 the house was purchased by Luman Andrews, the son of a local American Revolutionary War here. Andrews discovered blue limestone on the property, an important ingredient in portland cement, which prior to that time was imported to the United States from England. The quarry and kiln operation that Andrews established was productive until about 1860. The house's Greek Revival alterations were made during Andrews' ownership of the property. It was sold out of the Andrews family in 1873.

== See also ==
- National Register of Historic Places listings in Southington, Connecticut
