= Dr. Henry Skelton House =

Historic house in Connecticut, United States

- U.S. National Register of Historic Places
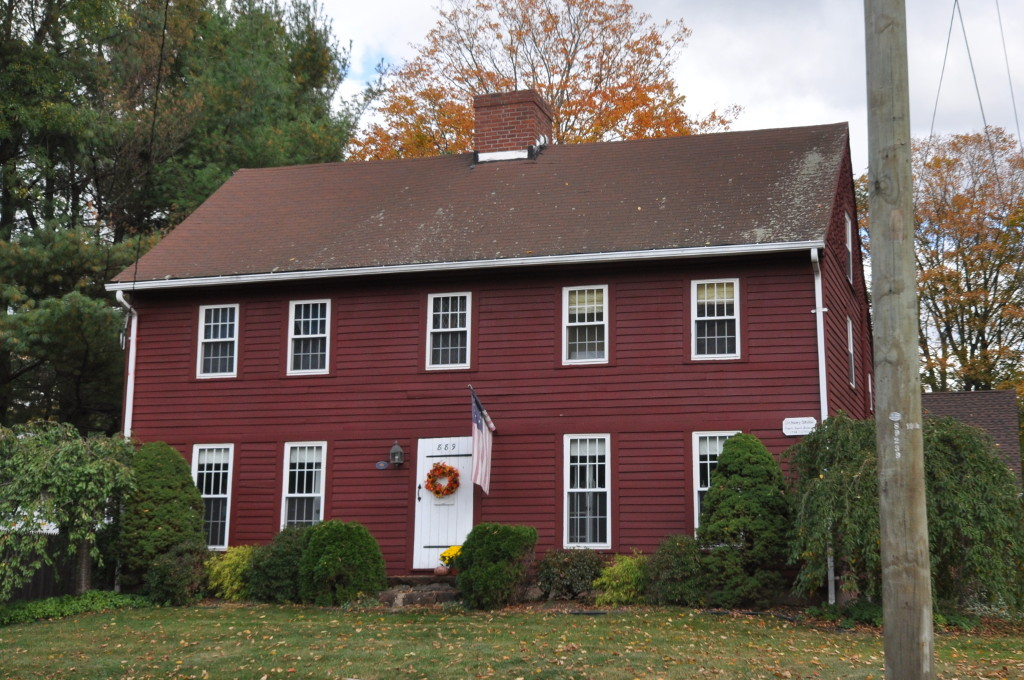

- Location within Connecticut Location within the United States
- Location: 889 South Main Street, Southington, Connecticut
- Coordinates: 41°35′2″N 72°53′32″W
- Area: 0.6 acres (0.24 ha)
- Built: 1748
- Architectural style: Colonial, New England Colonial
- MPS: Colonial Houses of Southington TR
- NRHP reference No.: 88003117
- Added to NRHP: January 19, 1989

Dr. Henry Skelton House is a historic house at 889 South Main Street in Southington, Connecticut, United States. Built about 1748, it is a well-preserved example of colonial Georgian architecture. It was listed on the National Register of Historic Places in 1989.

== Description and history ==
The Dr. Henry Skelton House is located south of the village center of Southington, at the northeast corner of South Main Street and Buckland Street. It is a 2 1/2-story wood-frame structure, with a side-gable roof, central brick chimney, and clapboarded exterior. Its main facade is five bays wide, with windows placed with slight asymmetry around a center entrance. The entrance has a period board door with strap hinges; it and the first floor windows (which are unusually tall for the period) are topped by a wooden stringcourse that serves as a lintel. A leanto section (apparently integral to the main body construction) extends to the rear, giving the house a saltbox profile. The side gable peak sections are finished in decorative Queen Anne style cut wooden shingles.

The house was built about 1748 for Southington's second doctor, Henry Skelton, who was born in England in 1688. The tall windows on the first floor are probably a later Greek Revival modification, and the building at one time sported a full-width Italianate porch.

== See also ==
- National Register of Historic Places listings in Southington, Connecticut
