= Timothy Hart House =

Historic house in Connecticut, United States

- U.S. National Register of Historic Places
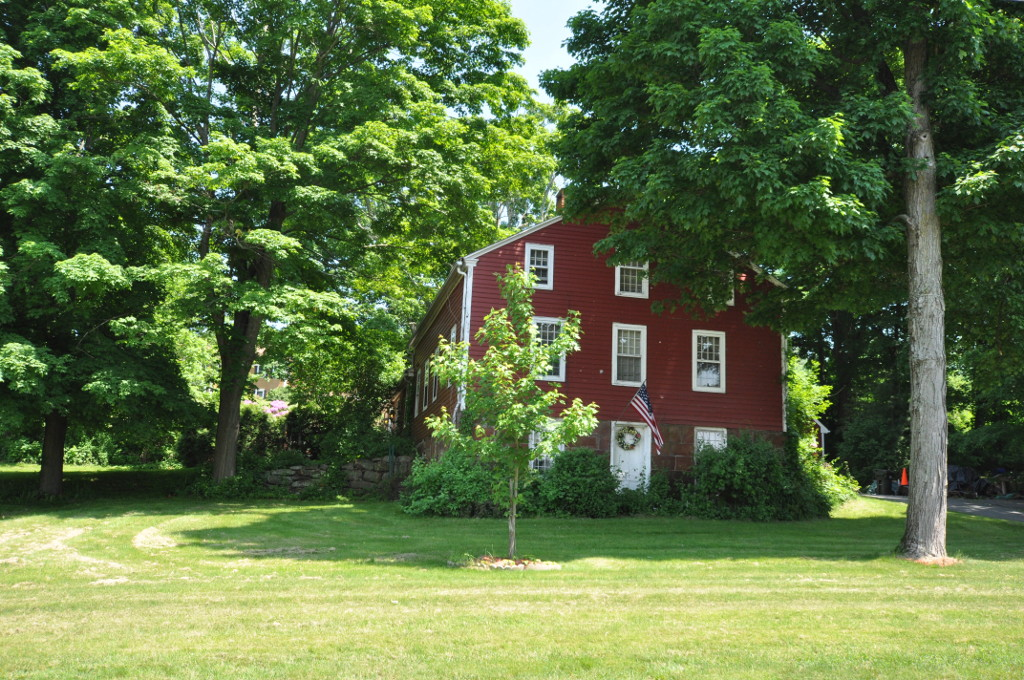
- Street-facing facade

- Location within Connecticut Location within the United States
- Location: 521 Flanders Road, Southington, Connecticut
- Coordinates: 41°37′9″N 72°50′43″W
- Area: 1.1 acres (0.45 ha)
- Built: 1810
- MPS: Colonial Houses of Southington TR
- NRHP reference No.: 88003100
- Added to NRHP: January 19, 1989

The Timothy Hart House is a historic house at 521 Flanders Road in Southington, Connecticut. Built about 1810, it is a well-preserved local example of vernacular early 19th-century Federal period architecture. It was listed on the National Register of Historic Places in 1989.

== Description and history ==
The Timothy Hart House stands in what is now a rural-suburban residential area of northeastern Southington. It is located on the east side of Flanders Road, south of its junction with Flanders Street. It is a 1 1/2-story wood-frame structure, with a gabled roof and clapboarded exterior, set on a partial basement of ashlar brownstone. It has a central chimney that is a replacement of the original. Its formal front facade is oriented facing south; it is five bays wide with the entrance at the center. The street-facing west facade has an exposed basement level owing to the sloping site, with a secondary entrance at the center of three bays, three windows on the main level, and three more in the attic level. Original interior features include a winding central staircase, wide floorboards, and three fireplaces, one with a period oven.

The house's construction date is uncertain. Although a local history gives it a date of 1822, other research has suggested a date of 1798. Based on architectural analysis, it appears to date to the first decade of the 19th century. It is remarkably well preserved as an essentially vernacular piece of period architecture, and is unusual for its treatment of the exposed basement level.

== See also ==
- National Register of Historic Places listings in Southington, Connecticut
