= Stephen Grannis House =

Historic house in Connecticut, United States

- U.S. National Register of Historic Places
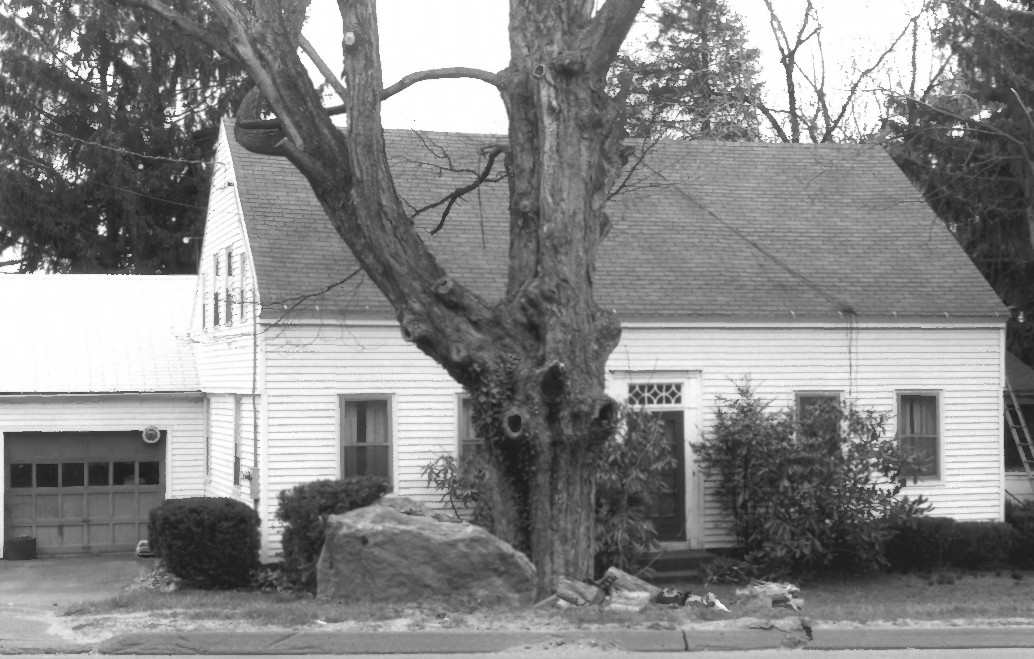
- 1985 photo

- Location within Connecticut Location within the United States
- Location: 1193 West Street, Southington, Connecticut
- Coordinates: 41°37′14″N 72°53′58″W
- Area: 1.3 acres (0.53 ha)
- Built: 1812
- MPS: Colonial Houses of Southington TR
- NRHP reference No.: 88003119
- Added to NRHP: January 19, 1989

The Stephen Grannis House was a historic house at 1193 West Street in Southington, Connecticut. Built about 1812, it was a good local example of Federal period architecture. It was listed on the National Register of Historic Places in 1989, and was demolished sometime thereafter.

== Description and history ==
The Stephen Grannis House stood on the east side of West Street (Connecticut Route 229), a busy through street in northwestern Southington, between Curtiss and Churchill Streets. It was a 1 1/2-story wood-frame structure, with a side-gable roof, central chimney, and exterior finished in clapboard-like asbestos siding. Its front facade was five bays wide, with symmetrically placed one-over-one sash windows on either side of a center entrance. The entrance was topped by a patterned rectangular glass transom window and a flat projecting cap with dentil moulding. The windows were topped by similar caps without moulding.

The house was built in 1812 for Stephen Grannis and is a good vernacular expression of Federal period architecture. Family tradition states that this house, and a similar one at 1137 West Street, were both built by Grannis' father for his two sons on the occasion of their marriages. It remained in the hands of Grannis' descendants, part of the locally significant interrelated Grannis, Andrews, and Tolles families, until the late 20th century. The house has been demolished since its listing on the National Register in 1988; the vacant land is still within the Tolles family.

== See also ==
- National Register of Historic Places listings in Southington, Connecticut
