= West Street School =

- U.S. National Register of Historic Places
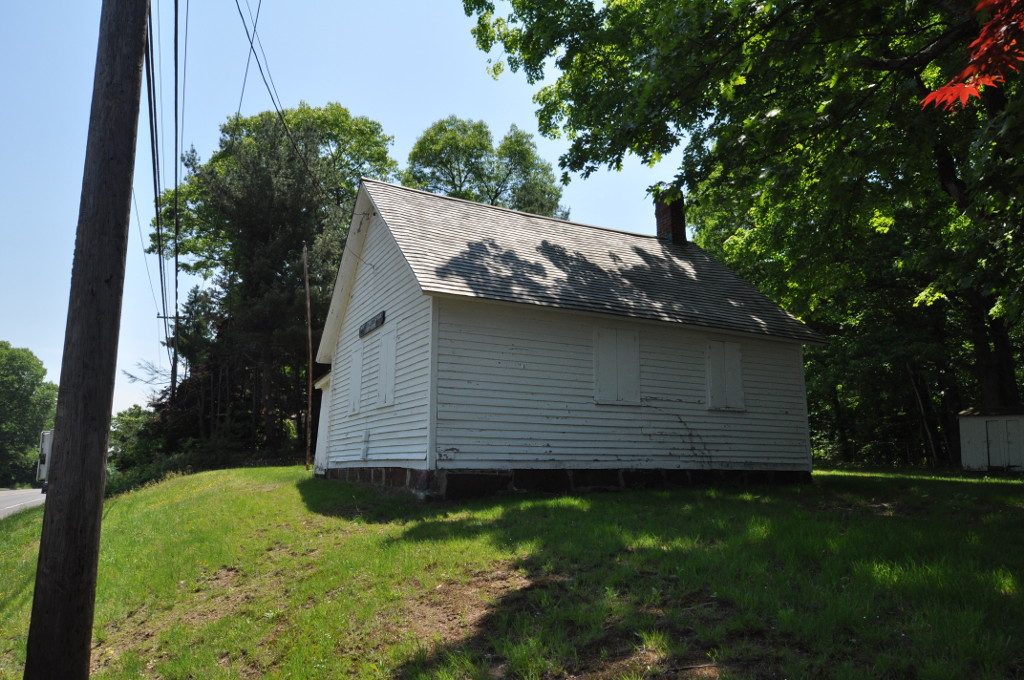

- Location within Connecticut Location within the United States
- Location: 1432 West Street, Southington, Connecticut
- Coordinates: 41°37′39″N 72°54′3″W
- Area: 0.3 acres (0.12 ha)
- Built: 1760
- NRHP reference No.: 88002689
- Added to NRHP: December 1, 1988

West Street School is a historic one-room school house at 1432 West Street in Southington, Connecticut. Built about 1760, it is the oldest surviving school building in the town. It served the town as a school until 1946, and is now preserved by the Southington Historical Society. It was added to the National Register of Historic Places in 1988.

== Description and history ==
The West Street School is located in a suburban setting in northwestern Southington, on the west side of West Street a short way south of its junction with Spring Street. It is set on a rise above the road, the result of a road widening project. It is a modest single-story wood frame structure, with a gabled roof and clapboarded exterior. The front facade has two windows, and each of the sides is three bays wide, with the entrance at the front of the left side. It is sheltered by a gabled vestibule. The interior of the building has a 19th-century finish, with wooden flooring and beadboard wainscoting. It was at that time furnished with desks bolted to the floor, but these have been removed. The property also includes a shed and a privy.

The school was built for a school district established by the town of Farmington (which this area was part of at the time) in 1750. It served as a public school of Farmington and then Southington until 1947, when the town consolidated its district schools. Maintenance of the school and its grounds was then taken over by the West Street School Alumni Association, which had been founded in 1922. Its care is now in the hands of the Southington Historical Society.

== See also ==
- National Register of Historic Places listings in Southington, Connecticut
