= Woodruff House (Southington, Connecticut) =

Historic house in Connecticut, United States

- U.S. National Register of Historic Places
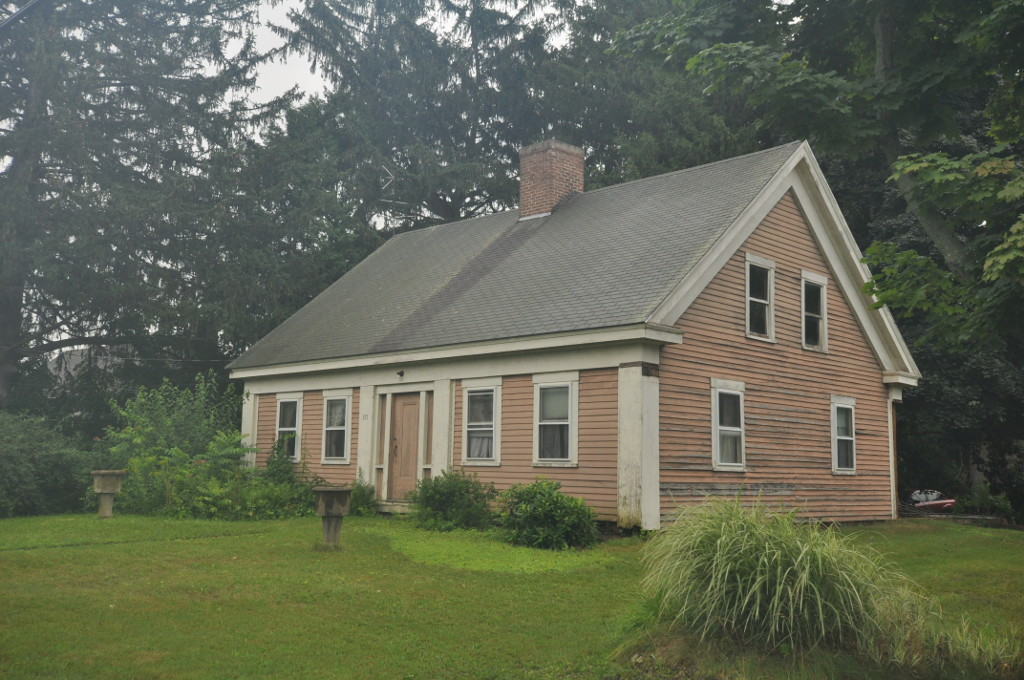

- Location within Connecticut Location within the United States
- Location: 377 Berlin Street, Southington, Connecticut
- Coordinates: 41°35′49″N 72°51′21″W
- Area: 0.5 acres (0.20 ha)
- Built: 1780
- Architectural style: Greek Revival
- MPS: Colonial Houses of Southington TR
- NRHP reference No.: 88003097
- Added to NRHP: January 19, 1989

The Woodruff House is a historic house at 377 Berlin Street in Southington, Connecticut. Built about 1780, it is a well-preserved example of an 18th-century Cape with later Greek Revival styling. It was listed on the National Register of Historic Places in 1989.

== Description and history ==
The Woodruff House stands east of downtown Southington, on the south side of Berlin Street (Connecticut Route 364) between Pleasant Street and Butternut Lane. It is a 1 1/2-story wood-frame structure, with a gable roof, central brick chimney, and clapboarded exterior. Its front facade is five bays wide, with corner pilasters rising to an entablature that runs beneath the eave. The centered entrance is flanked by sidelight windows and pilasters, and is topped by a corniced entablature. Interior features include 18th-century wide pine flooring, some original paneling, and three fireplaces. The entry vestibule, which commonly has a narrow winding staircase in houses of this age, was apparently built without one.

Based on deed research, the house is estimated to have been built about 1780, probably by a member of the Woodruff family, who were among the Southington area's early settlers. The Greek Revival features are a 19th-century addition, as are the inside window surrounds.

== See also ==
- National Register of Historic Places listings in Southington, Connecticut
