= Jotham Woodruff House =

Historic house in Connecticut, United States

- U.S. National Register of Historic Places
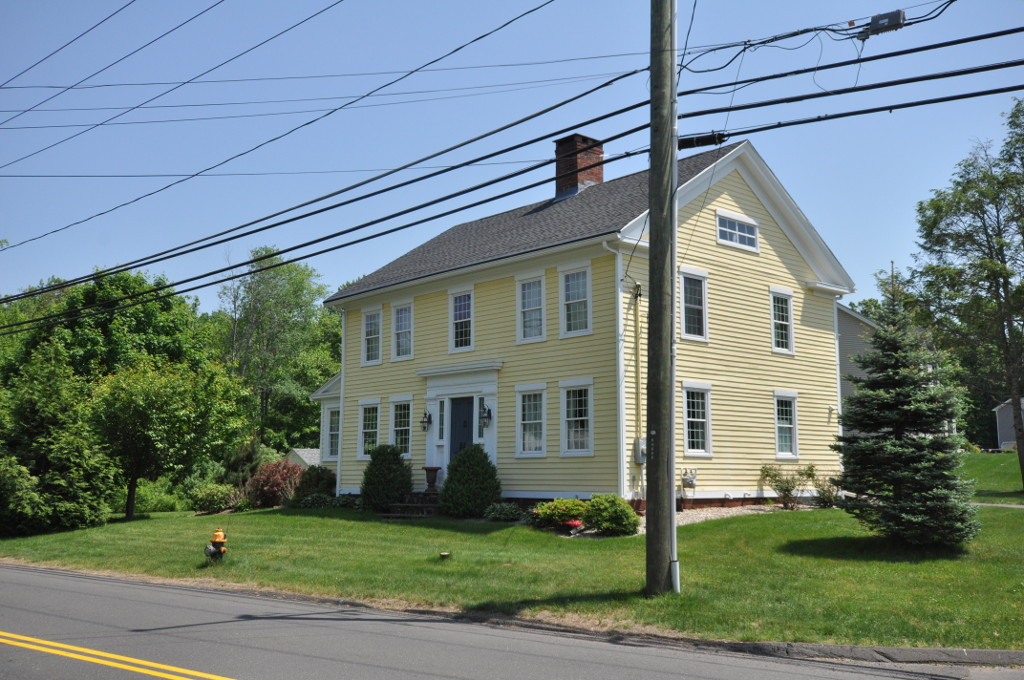

- Location within Connecticut Location within the United States
- Location: 11 Alyssa Court, Southington, Connecticut
- Coordinates: 41°36′7″N 72°52′13″W
- Area: 3 acres (1.2 ha)
- Built: 1790
- Architectural style: Colonial, New England Colonial
- MPS: Colonial Houses of Southington TR
- NRHP reference No.: 88003120
- Added to NRHP: January 19, 1989

The Jotham Woodruff House is a historic house at 11 Alyssa Court in Southington, Connecticut. Probably built about 1790, it is a good local example of late Georgian architecture with later Greek Revival alterations. It was listed on the National Register of Historic Places in 1989.

== Description and history ==
The Jotham Woodruff House stands in what is now a suburban residential area east of downtown Southington, on the south side of Woodruff Street at its junction with Alyssa Court. It is a 2 1/2-story wood-frame structure, with a gabled roof, central chimney, and clapboarded exterior. The gable ends have broad fascia boards and returns that are a 19th-century modification. Its main facade is five bays wide, with a center entrance flanked by sidelight windows and pilasters, and topped by a broad corniced entablature. A single-story shed-roof bay projects to the left side, and a single-story gabled ell extends to the rear, joining the main block to a 20th-century garage.

The house as traditionally been ascribed a construction date of about 1730, but stylistic evidence suggests a later date. It was probably built around 1790 by Jotham Woodruff, a member of one of Southington's founding families, who married in 1793. The entrance surround and the gable returns, added in the mid-19th century, are Greek Revival alterations.

== See also ==
- National Register of Historic Places listings in Southington, Connecticut
