= Capt. Samuel Woodruff House =

Historic house in Connecticut, United States

- U.S. National Register of Historic Places
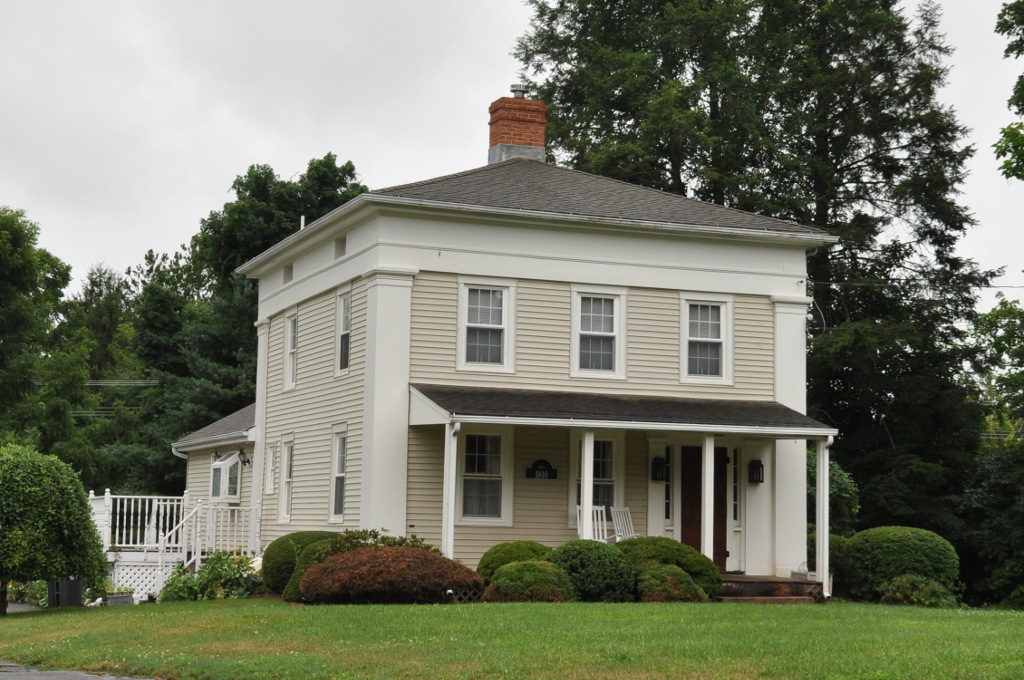

- Location within Connecticut Location within the United States
- Location: 23 Old State Road, Southington, Connecticut
- Coordinates: 41°35′53″N 72°50′49″W
- Area: 3.2 acres (1.3 ha)
- Built: c. 1840
- Architectural style: Greek Revival
- NRHP reference No.: 89000014
- Added to NRHP: May 5, 1989

The Capt. Samuel Woodruff House is a historic house at 23 Old State Road in Southington, Connecticut. Built about 1840, it is a well-preserved and somewhat rare example of a square Greek Revival farmhouse. It was listed on the National Register of Historic Places in 1989.

== Description and history ==
The Captain Samuel Woodruff House is located east of Southington's town center, facing north on the south side of Old State Road, an old alignment of the main Berlin road, which now passes just south of the property. It is a 2 1/2-story wood-frame structure, roughly square in shape, with a hip roof, central chimney, and clapboarded exterior. The main facade is three bays wide, with wide pilasters at the corners rising to an entablature. The main entrance is in the rightmost bay, framed by sidelight and transom windows. A single-story porch extends across the front facade, supported by plain square posts. There are single-story extensions to the rear and side of the main block. Interior features include an original staircase with Greek Revival details, wooden panels below parlor windows, and original doors and hardware. The property includes a number of smaller early 20th-century outbuildings.

The house was built about 1840, and is unusual among the town's remaining Greek Revival houses for its square plan. It was probably built by Captain Samuel Woodruff, whose family had owned land in the area for several generations. Woodruff was well known in the town as a veteran of the American Civil War and was a carpenter who co-owned a local carriage business. The property remained as rural farmland until the 1960s, and has since been subdivided into a suburban residential area.

== See also ==
- National Register of Historic Places listings in Southington, Connecticut
