= Ezekiel Woodruff House =

Historic house in Connecticut, United States

- U.S. National Register of Historic Places
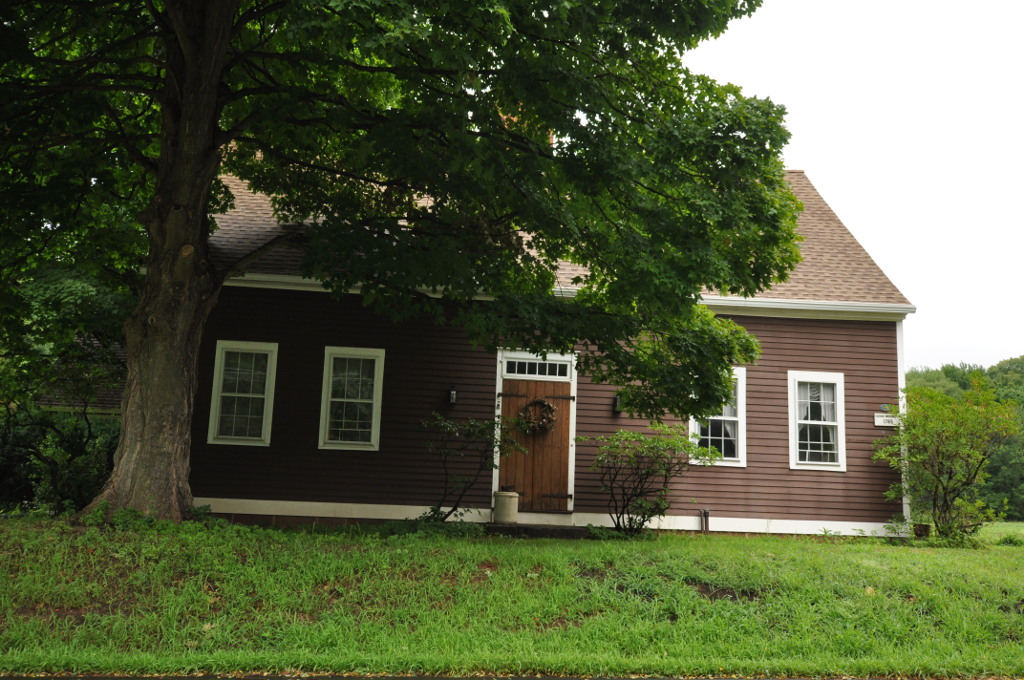

- Location within Connecticut Location within the United States
- Location: 1152 East Street, Southington, Connecticut
- Coordinates: 41°35′41″N 72°50′32″W
- Area: 0.8 acres (0.32 ha)
- Built: 1758
- MPS: Colonial Houses of Southington TR
- NRHP reference No.: 88003099
- Added to NRHP: January 19, 1989

The Ezekiel Woodruff House is a historic house at 1152 East Street in Southington, Connecticut., Built in the mid-to-late 18th-century, it is a well-preserved example of a Georgian Cape style house. It was listed on the National Register of Historic Places in 1989.

== Description and history ==
The Ezekiel Woodruff House is located in eastern Southington, on the east side of East Street (Connecticut Route 364), just south of its crossing of Misery Brook. It is a single-story wood-frame structure, with a gabled roof, central chimney, and clapboarded exterior. It is set close to the road, on a brownstone foundation, with a large brownstone slab as its front step. Its main facade is five bays wide, with a center entrance topped by a six-light transom window. Windows are rectangular sash, set in openings with simple surrounds. The interior retains a number of original features, including wide floorboards, wooden paneling, and fireplace surrounds.

The date of its construction was determined to be 1785 according to research performed in the 1950s by the Colonial Dames, and this date accords with the house's styling; however, in local records its construction date is given as 1758, which may be a simple transposition error. Ezekiel Woodruff for whom it was built, was descended from one of the area's first settlers. It is a well-preserved example of vernacular rural late Georgian architecture.

== See also ==
- National Register of Historic Places listings in Southington, Connecticut
