= Pultz & Walkley Company =

- U.S. National Register of Historic Places
- U.S. Historic district – Contributing property
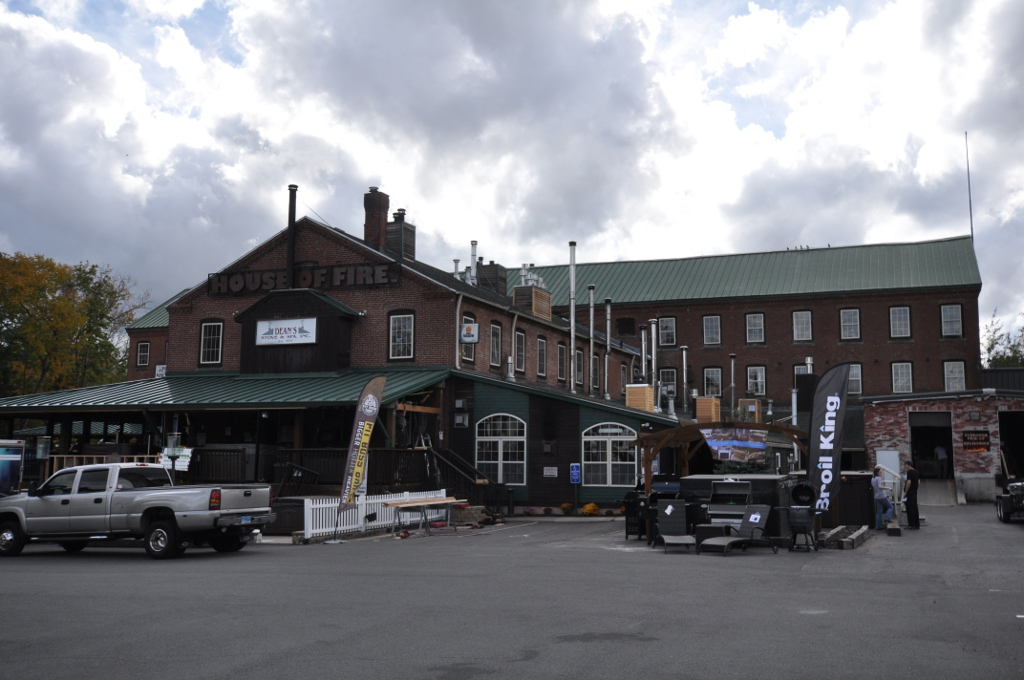

- Location within Connecticut Location within the United States
- Location: 120 West Main Street, Southington, Connecticut
- Coordinates: 41°35′12″N 72°53′34″W
- Area: 1.5 acres (0.61 ha)
- Built: 1880
- Architectural style: Industrial vernacular
- Part of: Plantsville Historic District (ID88002673)
- MPS: Historic Industrial Complexes of Southington TR
- NRHP reference No.: 88002677

Significant dates
- Added to NRHP: December 8, 1988
- Designated CP: December 1, 1988

The Pultz & Walkley Company, also known more recently as The Five Star Company, is a historic industrial complex at 120 West Main Street in the Plantsville village of Southington, Connecticut. Founded in the 1870s, Pultz & Walkley was a major producer of paper bags. The multi-building complex is one of the town's better-preserved industrial properties, and was listed on the National Register of Historic Places in 1988.

== Description and history ==
The Pultz & Walkley complex is located on the south side of the central village of Plantsville. It is set well back from the street, behind a municipal parking lot and in front of the former Blakeslee Forging Company industrial complex. Its main buildings are tall 3-1/2 and 2 1/2-story brick buildings, oriented in a T shape with the leg of the T facing north toward West Main Street. These buildings are in typical late 19th-century commercial Italianate style, with windows set in segmented-arch openings, and with corbelled brickwork cornices. Smaller buildings have been attached to the southern side of the larger structure.

Pultz & Walkley was established in 1870 by L.V. Walkley and J.P. Pultz, who had invented machinery for manufacturing paper bags. The surviving main building of the complex is estimated to date to 1875, and was enlarged in 1898. The plant turned out 3 million bags in 1899. The well-preserved street-facing northern facade is a prominent reminder of Southington's industrial heritage.

== See also ==
- National Register of Historic Places listings in Southington, Connecticut
