= William Woodruff House =

Historic house in Arkansas, United States

- U.S. National Register of Historic Places
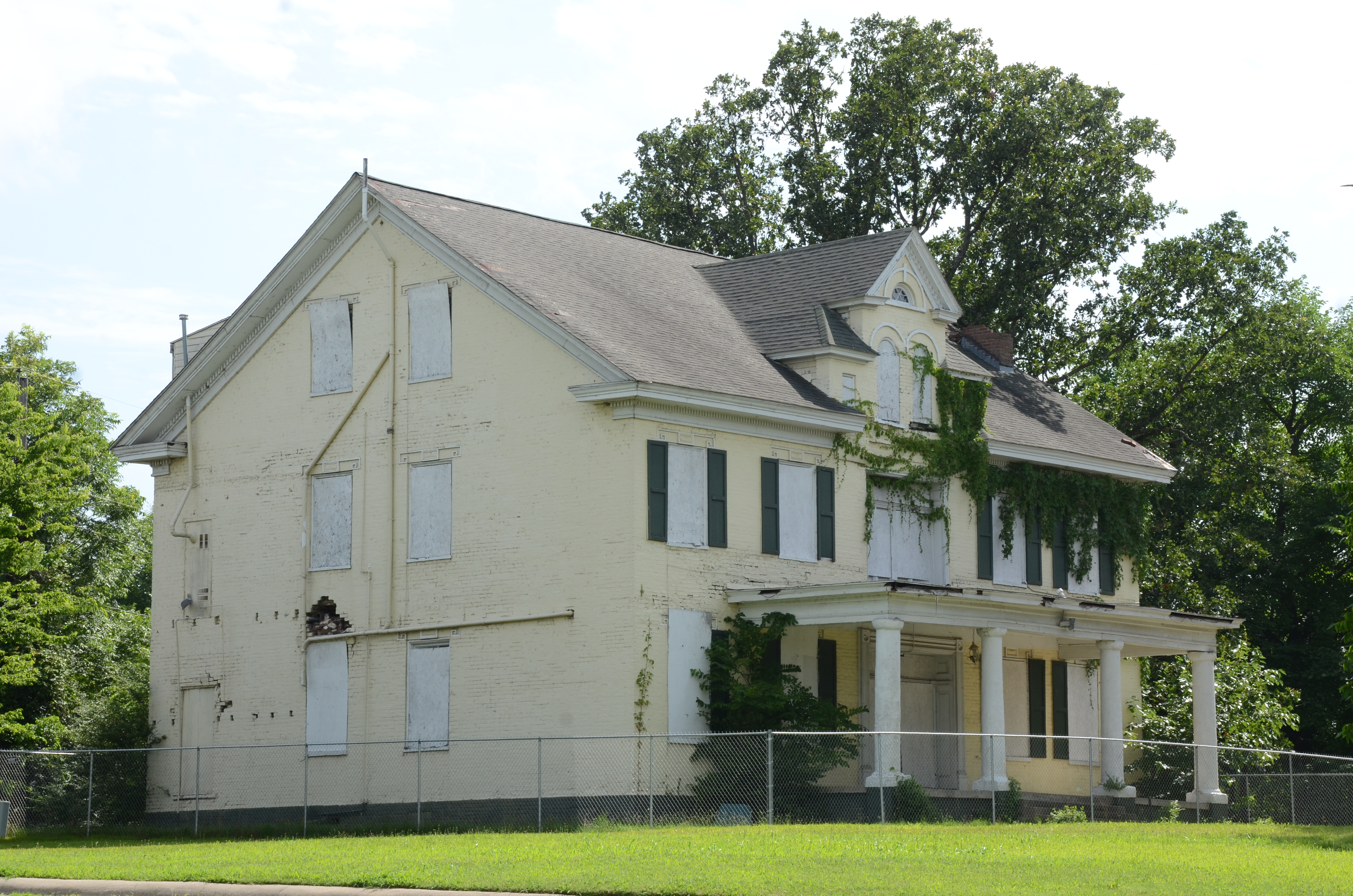

- Location within Arkansas Location within the United States
- Location: 1017 E. 8th St., Little Rock, Arkansas
- Coordinates: 34°44′24″N 92°15′32″W
- Area: less than one acre
- Architect: John Robins
- Architectural style: Greek Revival
- NRHP reference No.: 89000173
- Added to NRHP: March 21, 1989

The William Woodruff House is a historic house at 1017 East 8th Street in Little Rock, Arkansas, United States. It is a 2 1/2-story brick structure, with a gabled roof. A single-story porch extends across the central portion of the front, supported by Doric columns, and there is a large gable dormer projecting from the roof, housing a pair of round-arch windows and a small half-round window in the gable. The core of the house was built in 1853 for William E. Woodruff, publisher of the first newspaper west of the Mississippi River.

The house was listed on the National Register of Historic Places in 1989. It is one of four remaining antebellum homes in Little Rock.

== History ==
Woodruff was an early advocate, newspaper publisher, and politician in Arkansaw Territory and Little Rock. During the height of his career, he moved from his apartment above the newspaper office to a 25 acres (10 ha) urban farmstead of orchards, livestock, and gardens. The home was built of on-site cypress and bricks, likely using slave labor and was overseen by local builder John Robins. Originally facing Ninth Street, the two-and-a-half story home contained ten rooms, with outbuildings for laundry and slave quarters.

During the American Civil War, Union troops intercepted a letter in which Woodruff was voicing support for the Confederacy. He was expelled from Little Rock; the Union took over the home, but allowed Woodruff's wife and daughters to stay for a few months before expelling them as well. It was used as a Union headquarters and military hospital until the end of the war, when the Woodruff family returned.

Woodruff died in 1885, and it remained in the family until 1891. It later became a boarding house for women, and was later modified into 14 apartment units. A fire in 2005 made the home uninhabitable. It was vacant and subject to vandalism until the Quapaw Quarter Association bought it in 2016.

== See also ==
- National Register of Historic Places listings in Little Rock, Arkansas
- Headquarters House, home with similar history in Fayetteville, Arkansas
