= Urbana Woodruff House =

Historic house in Connecticut, United States

- U.S. National Register of Historic Places
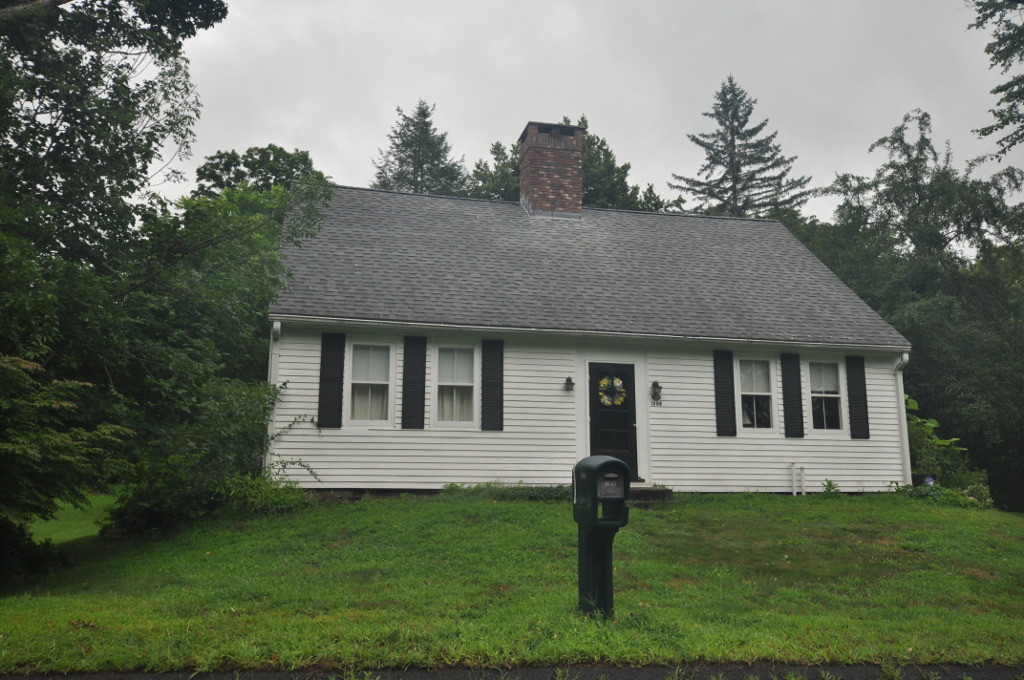

- Location within Connecticut Location within the United States
- Location: 1096 East Street, Southington, Connecticut
- Coordinates: 41°35′37″N 72°50′31″W
- Area: 3 acres (1.2 ha)
- Built: 1784
- MPS: Colonial Houses of Southington TR
- NRHP reference No.: 88003098
- Added to NRHP: January 19, 1989

The Urbana Woodruff House is a historic house at 1096 East Street in Southington, Connecticut. Built about 1784, it is a well-preserved example of vernacular Georgian architecture. It was listed on the National Register of Historic Places in 1989.

== Description and history ==
The Urbana Woodruff House stands in a rural-residential area of eastern Southington, on the east side of East Street at its junction with Kensington Street. It is a single-story wood frame structure, with a side gable roof, central brick chimney, and clapboarded exterior. Its main facade is five bays wide, with a center entrance. A secondary entrance is located on the right side; both entrances feature vertical board doors with original hardware. Windows are two-over-two sash, and both door and window moulding is very simple. The interior retains a number of original period features, include some wide floorboards, wooden wall paneling, and fireplace mantels. An early 20th-century garage stands just north of the house.

The house was built about 1784 for Urbana Woodruff, and is a good example of vernacular Georgian architecture. He was the son of Isaac Woodruff, one of Southington's early colonial settlers. In the early 20th century the house was home to John Jamieson, who supplied ice to Southington's population from nearby Sloper Pond.

The Woodruff names may be confused. Urban Woodruff (1799-1873), son of Isaac Woodruff (1773-1807), could not have built this house, if it is dated correctly, but his uncle Urbane [sic] Woodruff (1766-1798) could have. Urbane and his wife Silence Woodruff, née Sloper, are buried in Southington's South End Burying Ground.

== See also ==
- National Register of Historic Places listings in Southington, Connecticut
