= Woodruff (given name) =

Woodruff is a given name. Notable people with the name include:

- Woodruff Leeming (1870–1919), American architect
- Woodruff T. Sullivan III (born 1944), American astronomer
