= Jonathan Root =

Jonathan Root may refer to:

- Jon Root (born 1964), former American volleyball player
- Jonathan Root (photographer) (born 1959), English portrait photographer
- Jonathan Root, early settler of Southington, Connecticut, namesake of the Jonathan Root House
