= Zarrella =

Zarrella is a surname. Notable people with the surname include:

- Dale Zarrella, Hawaiian sculptor and painter
- Giovanni Zarrella (born 1978), German-Italian singer and television presenter
- Jana Ina Zarrella (born 1976), Brazilian television personality and presenter
- John Zarrella, American news correspondent
