= Clark Brothers Factory No. 1 =

- U.S. National Register of Historic Places
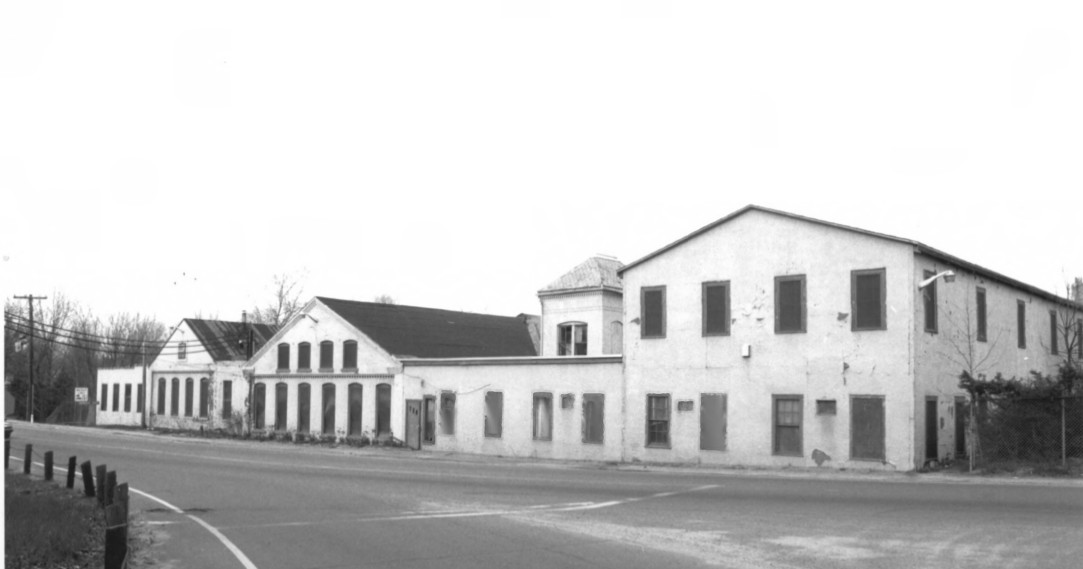
- Factory complex, 1988

- Location within Connecticut Location within the United States
- Location: 1331 South Main Street, Southington, Connecticut
- Coordinates: 41°34′15″N 72°53′47″W
- Area: 4.7 acres (1.9 ha)
- Built: 1893
- Architectural style: Industrial vernacular
- MPS: Historic Industrial Complexes of Southington TR
- NRHP reference No.: 88002679
- Added to NRHP: December 8, 1988

The Clark Brothers Factory No. 1 was a historic industrial complex at 1331 South Main Street in the Milldale area of Southington, Connecticut. Developed beginning in the 1850s, it was one of the nation's largest sources of carriage bolts. The complex listed on the National Register of Historic Places in 1988 consisted of a group of brick buildings dating to 1893 and later. It has since been entirely demolished, and the land stands vacant and overgrown.

== Description and history ==
The Clark Brothers Factory was located in central southern Southington, on the east side of South Main Street just south of the Quinnipiac River and east of Clark Street. The complex consisted of nine connected buildings, the largest of which were all either one or 1-1/2 stories in height. The main buildings housed the machine shops in which the company manufactured its products, while the smaller attached buildings typically provided space for supporting functions. The complex included a dam across the Quinnipiac River, and a headrace that supplied water to the complex for power.

The Clark Brothers were one of the first industries in Southington, and played a significant role in its development as an industrial community in the second half of the 19th century. The company began manufacturing bolts for carriages in wood-frame buildings on this site, using water power from the Quinnipiac River. It developed innovations in the manufacture of these fasteners, including a specialized "hammer lathe" that formed the bolt's head while cutting the thread, and eventually fully automated the manufacturing process. The company's existing buildings on the site were destroyed by fire in 1893, and new facilities were immediately built in brick.

The buildings were demolished some time after their listing on the National Register of Historic Places in 1988. The dam was removed from the river in 2016.

== See also ==
- Clark Brothers Factory No. 2, still standing on Canal Street
- National Register of Historic Places listings in Southington, Connecticut
