= Clark Brothers Factory No. 2 =

- U.S. National Register of Historic Places
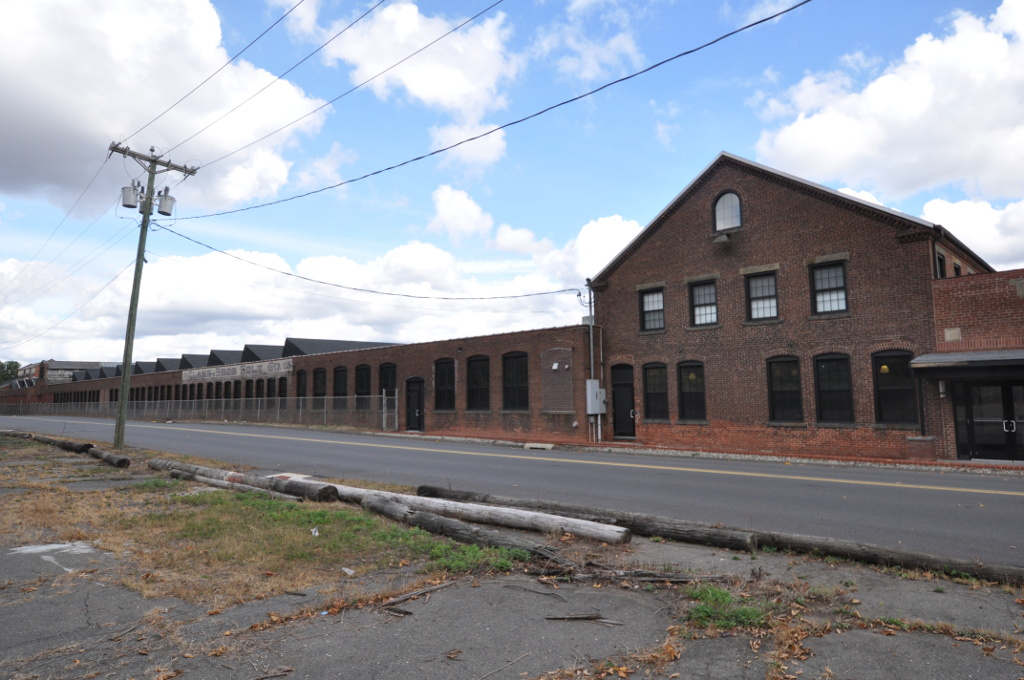

- Location within Connecticut Location within the United States
- Location: 409 Canal Street, Southington, Connecticut
- Coordinates: 41°34′3″N 72°54′9″W
- Area: 5.7 acres (2.3 ha)
- Built: 1911
- Architectural style: Industrial vernacular
- MPS: Historic Industrial Complexes of Southington TR
- NRHP reference No.: 88002680
- Added to NRHP: December 8, 1988

The Clark Brothers Factory No. 2, also known as Clark Brothers Bolt Company, is an industrial complex at 409 Canal Street in Southington, Connecticut. Built between 1911 and 1918, the complex is a good example of vernacular industrial architecture of the early 20th century, and was home to one of the community's major industrial employers. The complex was listed on the National Register of Historic Places in 1988.

== Description and history ==
The Clark Brothers Factory No. 2 is located in Southington's Milldale section, on the east side of Canal Street, roughly midway between Burritt Street and Connecticut Route 322. It is a long and basically linear complex, most of which is sandwiched between the road and a railroad right-of-way that now carries the Farmington Canal Heritage Trail. The complex consists of eleven buildings, ten of which are connected, and one (a boiler house) that is located across the railroad right-of-way. Notable buildings in the complex include a large manufacturing building with an original sawtooth roof, and a heat-treatment and forge building with a monitor roof.

The Clark Brothers Company was one of the early industrial concerns in Southington, and was influential in its growth as an industrial community in the second half of the 19th century. In the 1850s they developed specialized equipment for the manufacture of carriage bolts, a process they eventually automated in its entirety. Originally located in a factory on South Main Street (since demolished), they had this facility built beginning in 1911, using steam power for the manufacturing processes instead of water. It was expanded during the First World War, and broadened its production line to include other types of fasteners.

== See also ==
- National Register of Historic Places listings in Southington, Connecticut
