= Joel Root =

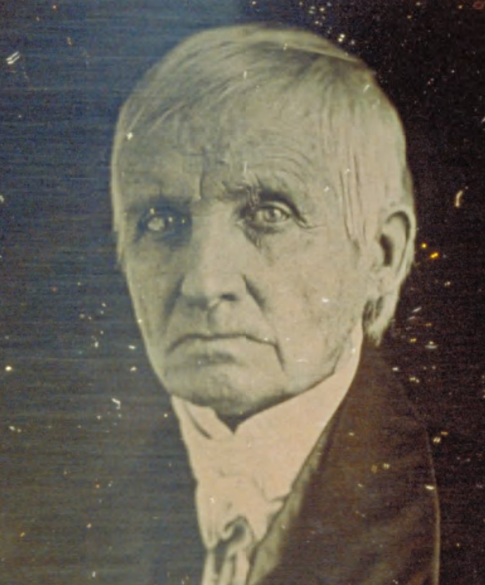
- Born: August 31, 1770; Southington, Connecticut Colony, British America
- Died: January 12, 1847
- Occupations: Supercargo on the sealing ship Huron, author

Joel Root (1770–1847) was an American sailor. He authored a journal of his around the world voyage while working as supercargo on the sealing ship Huron.

== Biography ==
Among Root's earliest American ancestors who settled in Connecticut were Captain William Curtis (1618–1702) from Essex, England, and John Porter (1623–1688) and Mary Stanley (1631–1688) from Kent, England. On his father's side of the family his earliest American ancestors were John Root (1608–1684) from Northamptonshire, England, and Mary Francis Kilbourne (1619–1697) from Cambridge, England. Root's mother, Lucy Curtis Root, died when he was two, and when he was six, his father, Col. Elisha Root (1737–1776), died of dysentery while serving in the Revolutionary War army in West Chester, Connecticut. Joel and his two sisters inherited their father's farm of one hundred twenty acres and the good country house in which they lived. He was then adopted and raised by his paternal grandfather, Jonathan Root (1707–1794), namesake of the Jonathan Root House in Southington, Connecticut, now listed in the National Register of Historic Places.

== Journey around the world on the brig Huron ==
Root sailed out of New Haven harbor in 1802 on the Huron with Captain David Montthrop (variant spelling Molthrop) in what he expected to be a lucrative adventure trading in seal furs.

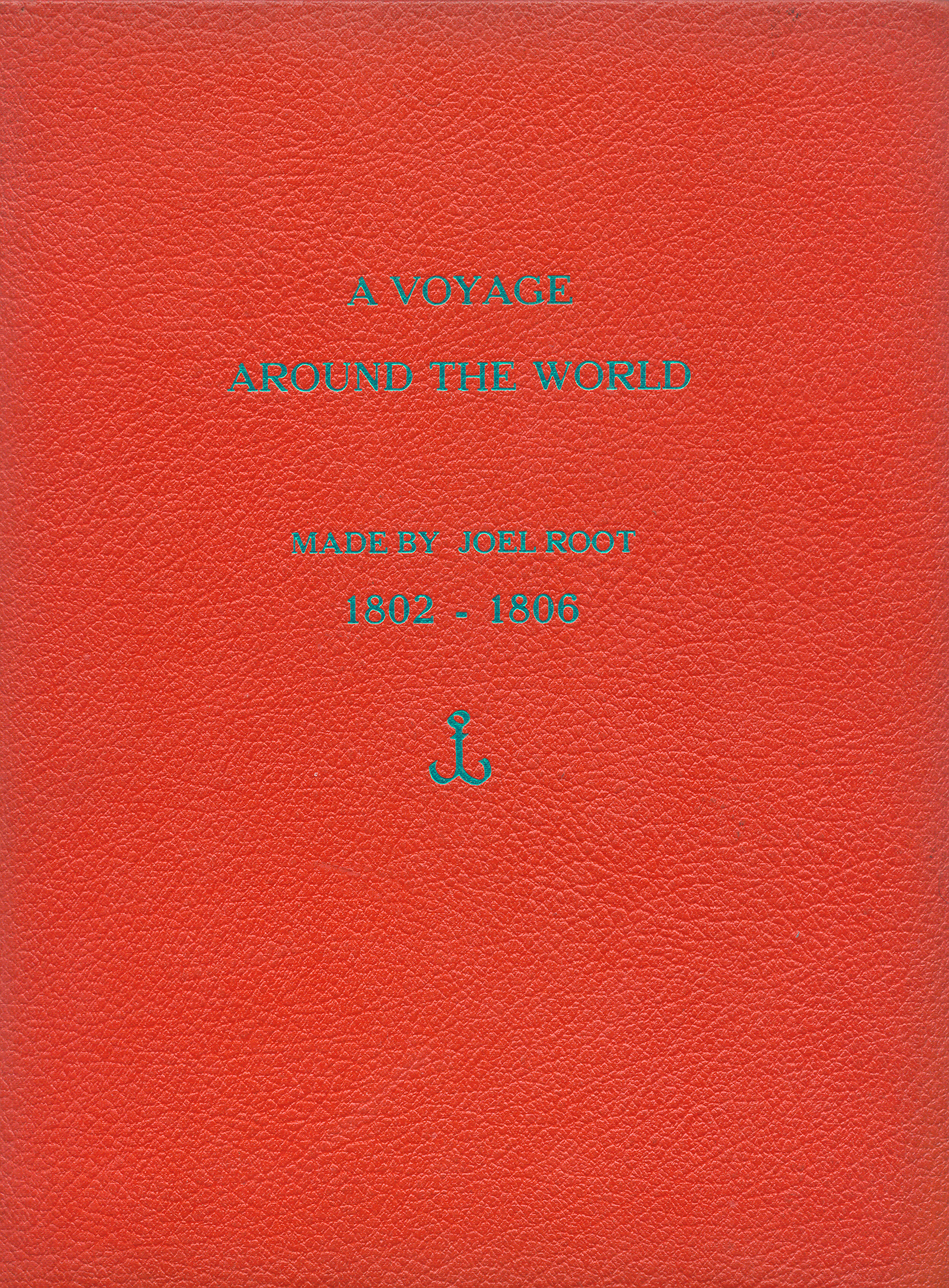
Joel Root 0166(667)

The port of New Haven was a frequent point of departure for sealing expeditions. The first recorded voyage to sealing grounds along the shores of the southern Pacific Ocean was that of Captain Daniel Greene from New Haven in 1790. Root's memoir, written in 1840, recounts his adventures and misadventures while engaged in sealing operations mostly on islands off the coast of Chile. He gives a "detailed account of efforts to take hair seal skins for the American market and fur seal skins for the Chinese trade, primarily from the islands of Mocha, St. Mary's and Masafuero [Mas a tierra], in the Juan Fernandez Islands." Masafuero was also known as Mas Afuero "further away," or Alexander Selkirk's Island, or the Robinson Crusoe Islands. Daniel Defoe based his novel Robinson Crusoe on the experiences of Alexander Selkirk's survival on the island between 1704 and 1709.

Root tells of navigation disagreements with the Captain of the brig Huron. He tells how he was cast ashore on the Indian inhabited coast of Peru, and he tells of his imprisonment by the Spanish at Concepción, Chile and difficulty with the Spanish government while sealing on the Island of Masafuero. The Huron made the long voyage home via China and Europe, trading along the way in Canton, China, Hamburg, Germany and St. Petersburg, Russia. Root and his party arrived back in the United States at New York, their first home port, on October 26, 1806, four years after their departure. He arrived home in New Haven on October 30, where his wife and seven daughters were in good health, having survived the smallpox epidemic, and were overjoyed to see him. From his travels, he presented gifts of fine fabric for the trousseau of each of his daughters, linens for his wife's linen closet, and China tea cups for each of the girls. His memoir was titled A Voyage Around the World 1802–1806.

There is no record of his going to sea again. When Root died at age 76, he was buried at Grove Street Cemetery in New Haven.
