= Murder of Rebecca Landrith =

2021 murder in Pennsylvania, United States

Rebecca Landrith was murdered in 2021. Her body was dumped near an Interstate 80 ramp in Pennsylvania. Police arrested Tracy Ray Rollins, a 29-year old truck driver from Texas. Surveillance videos show 47-year old former model with Rollins at truck stops and a fast food restaurant in three Midwestern states.

Rollins was charged in Pennsylvania with homicide and abuse of a corpse. The district attorney did not seek the death penalty. In 2022, Rollins was sentenced to 40-80 years in state prison.

== Victim ==
Landrith was born in Alexandria, Virginia. According to her biography she was a professional model in NYC. She played violin, was a contestant on "America's It Girl" and a finalist in the 2014 Miss Manhattan Pageant. She was shot 18 times, most likely in the cab of Rollins's truck. Her body was dumped along the interstate exit. Officials say they believe she was probably killed at another location before her body was dumped. The body was reported by a PennDOT worker early Sunday morning. State police said she had recently been travelling through the Midwestern United States.

== Accused ==
Police arrested Tracy Ray Rollins, a 29-year-old truck driver, in Connecticut a few days after Landrith's body was found. Police said they found his name on a note discovered on the victim's body. They were seen together on surveillance video at a truck stop in Wisconsin, at a Popeye's in Indiana, and again at a truck stop in Ohio. Cell phone data placed Rollins at the I-80. Police recovered spent shells and physical evidence from the sleeper portion of Rollins' truck. He was arrested at a truck stop in Southington, Connecticut. Rollins told police he does not know Landrith.

== Trial ==
Rollins was charged in Pennsylvania with homicide and abuse of a corpse. The district attorney did not seek the death penalty. In 2022, Rollins was sentenced to 40-80 years in state prison.
