= New England Baptist College =

Coordinates: 41.6303°N 72.8995°W

- Type: Private Bible college
- Established: 2004
- President: Pastor Joel Boyle
- Location: Southington, Connecticut, U.S.
- Website: www.newenglandbaptistcollege.com

New England Baptist College is a Christian college located at 1541 West Street in Southington, Connecticut.

It was founded in 2004 and is affiliated with the nearby Central Baptist Church and Central Christian Academy.
