= Valentine Wightman House =

Historic house in Connecticut, United States

- U.S. National Register of Historic Places
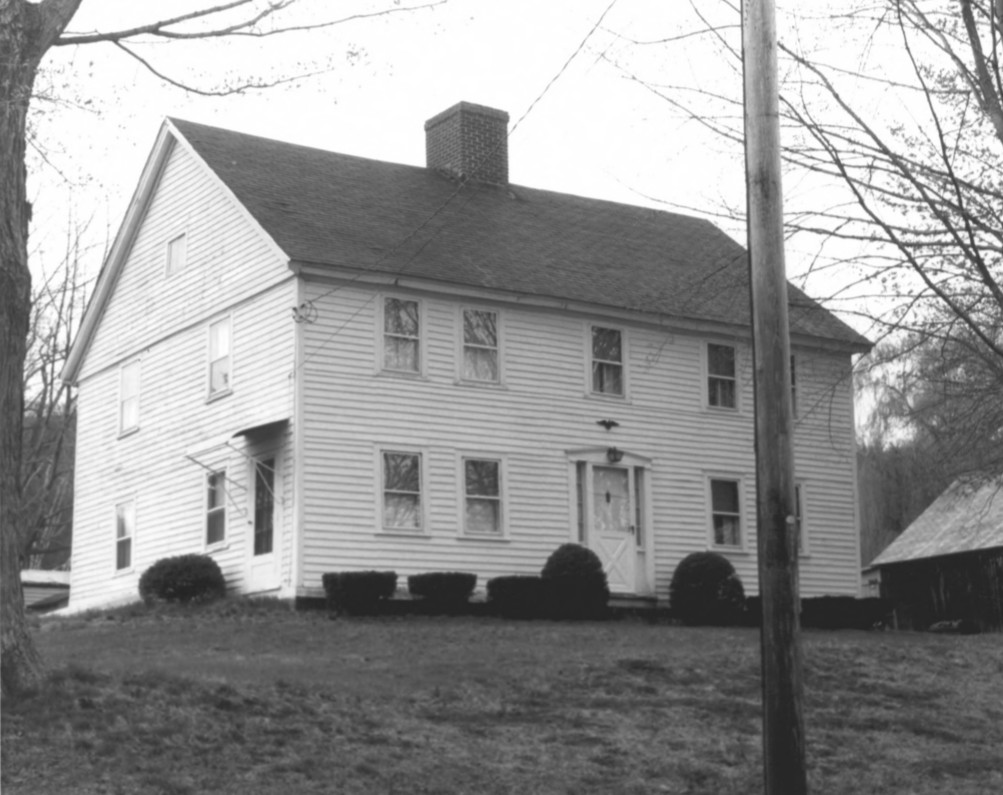
- 1985 photo

- Location within Connecticut Location within the United States
- Location: 1112 Mount Vernon Road, Southington, Connecticut
- Coordinates: 41°36′4″N 72°55′32″W
- Area: 3 acres (1.2 ha)
- Built: 1800
- Architectural style: Colonial, New England Colonial
- MPS: Colonial Houses of Southington TR
- NRHP reference No.: 88003112
- Added to NRHP: January 19, 1989

The Valentine Wightman House was a historic house at 1112 Mount Vernon Road in Southington, Connecticut. It was built around 1800 and was added to the National Register of Historic Places in 1989. It has apparently been demolished.

== Description ==
The Valentine Wightman House stood in western Southington, on the west side of Mount Vernon Road at its junction with Whitman Road. It was a 2 1/2-story wood-frame structure, with a gabled roof, central chimney, and clapboarded exterior. Its front facade was five bays wide, with a central entrance flanked by sidelight windows and narrow moulding, and topped by a peaked lintel. The gable ends slightly overhung the sidewalls. The interior included three period fireplaces and some original wide flooring and carved wooden paneling. Its location is now occupied by a modern single-story house. The property also includes a 19th-century barn and farm outbuildings.

The house was probably built about 1800 for Valentine Wightman, the son of Reverend John Wightman, whose house still stands further south on Mount Vernon Road and who was the second settled Baptist minister in Southington. The house was notable primarily for its architecture, as a well-preserved example of late Georgian architecture.

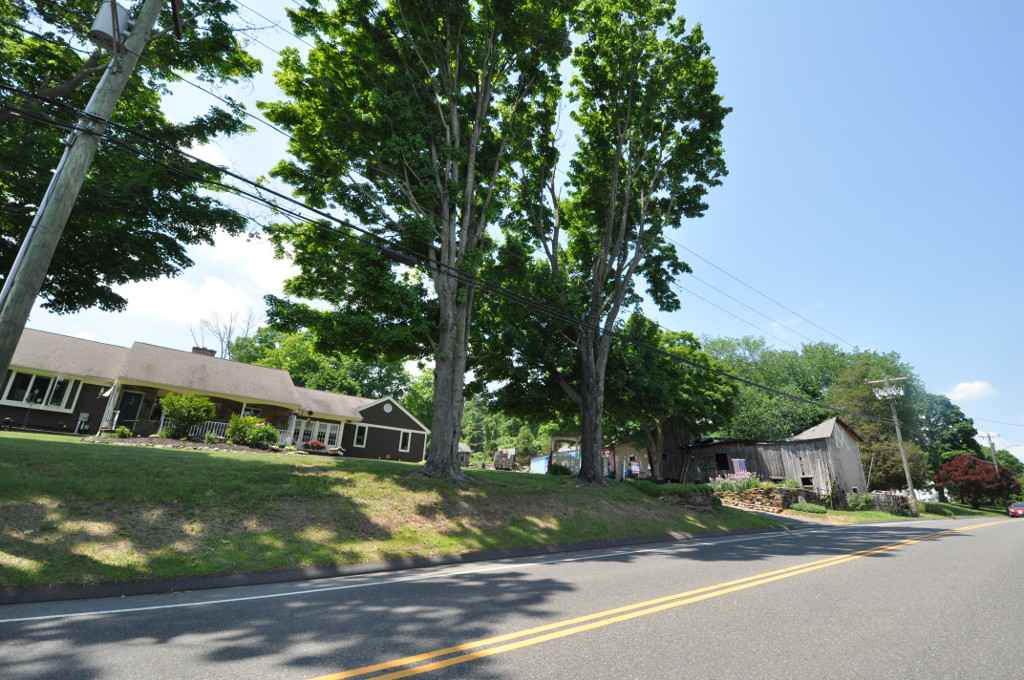
Site where house stood, in 2018

== See also ==
- National Register of Historic Places listings in Southington, Connecticut
