= Andrew Upson =

American politician

Andrew Upson (May 18, 1825 – February 18, 1864) was an American politician and American Civil War officer.

He was son of Levi Upson, born in Southington, Connecticut, on May 18, 1825.

He graduated from Yale College in 1849. After two years employed in teaching at Salem, New Jersey, and Wellsboro, Pennsylvania, he returned to his native place, and resided there, engaged in agriculture. He was a member of the General Assembly of Connecticut in 1854.

In August, 1862, Upson entered the military service of the country as First Lieutenant, Company E, 20th Connecticut Infantry Regiment and was subsequently promoted to be Captain of Co K., in the same Regiment. In the Battle of Chancellorsville, May 3, 1863, he was taken prisoner and carried to Libby Prison. After his release, he was stationed with his company at Tracy City, Tennessee, a small place on the Cumberland Mountains, which it was important to hold for the protection of a coal mine worked for the government. On the 20th of Jan., 1864, a detachment of rebel cavalry dashed into the place to take over the general store. Captain Upson was standing by the depot with about ten of his men, some distance from their weapons. Upson noticing the Captain and his men assumed, the rebel cavalry shot at them. Captain Upson was shot twice and captured with his men for over four hours. Captain Upson survived for a time and continued to write letters home to his family. On the 19th of February he died from the effects of the double wounds.

He married Miss Elizabeth Gridley, of Southington, Connecticut, who, with three children, survived him.
