= Southington, Connecticut =

- Town
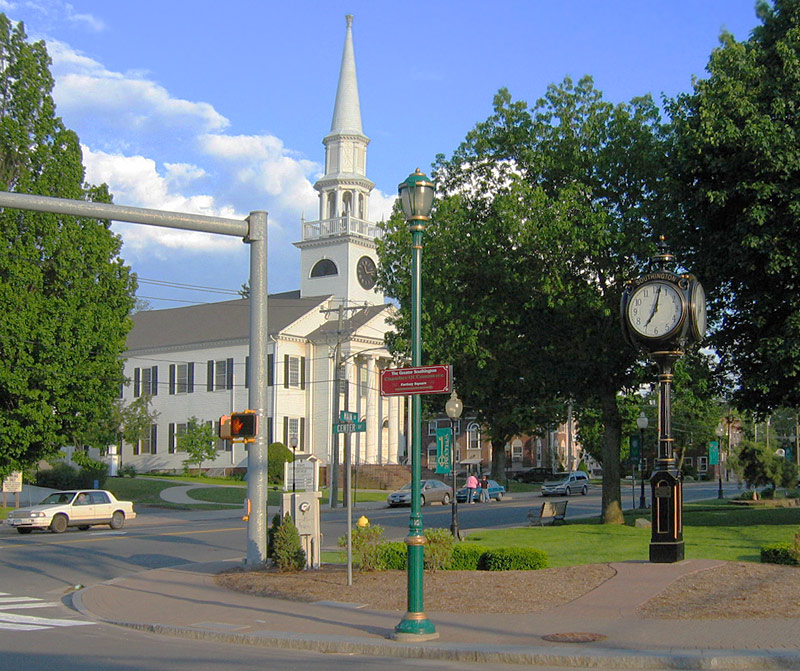
- First Congregational Church in town center

- Flag Seal
- Motto: The City of Progress
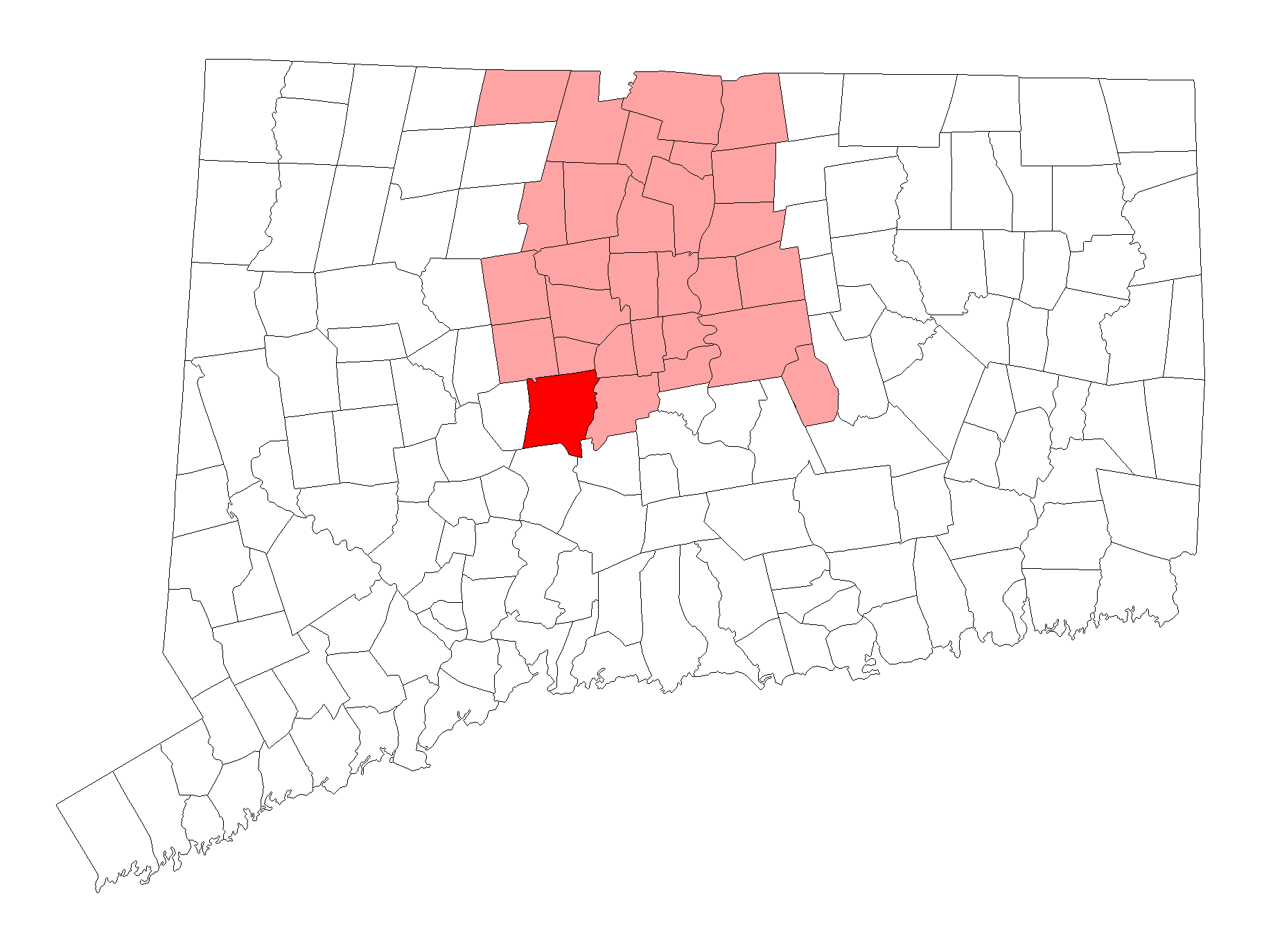
- Interactive map of Southington, Connecticut
- Location within the state of Connecticut Location within the United States
- Coordinates: 41°36′18″N 72°52′45″W
- Country: United States
- U.S. state: Connecticut
- County: Hartford
- Region: Capitol Region
- Incorporated: February 15, 1779
- Consolidated: April 28, 1947

Government
  - Type: Council-manager
  - Town manager: Alex Ricciardone
  - Town council: Paul Chaplinsky Jr. (R), Chair; Jennifer Clock (R), Vice Chair; Michael DelSanto (R); Tony Morrison (R); Joshua Serafino (R); Jim Morelli (R); Christopher Palmieri (D); David Zoni (D); Kristen Guida (D)

Area
  - Total: 36.6 sq mi (94.8 km^{2})
  - Land: 35.9 sq mi (92.9 km^{2})
  - Water: 0.73 sq mi (1.9 km^{2})
- Elevation: 154 ft (47 m)

Population (2020)
  - Total: 43,821
  - Density: 1,212/sq mi (468.1/km^{2})
- Time zone: UTC−5 (Eastern)
  - Summer (DST): UTC−4 (Eastern)
- ZIP Codes: 06489, 06479, 06467, 06444
- Area codes: 860/203
- FIPS code: 09-70550
- GNIS feature ID: 0213508
- Website: www.southingtonct.gov

Southington (/ˈsʌðɪŋtən/ SUH-thing-tən) is a town in Hartford County, Connecticut, United States. The town is part of the Capitol Planning Region. As of the 2020 United States census, it had a population of 43,501. Southington contains the villages of Marion, Milldale, and Plantsville.

== History ==
Although Southington was formally established as a town in 1779, its roots go back to a much earlier time. Samuel Woodruff, Southington's first white settler, moved from Farmington to the area then known as "Panthorne" that was settled in 1698. It became the "South Society of Farmington" in 1726 and became a separate town in 1779.The land was formerly occupied by the Tunxis or Sepores Indians. The settlement grew, prospered, and came to be known as "South Farmington" and then later, the shortened version, Southington.

The town's most important early visitor was General George Washington, who passed through the town in 1770 on his way to Wethersfield.

The Marion section of Southington is one of the most historic places in the town. It is the site of an encampment by the great French general, Jean-Baptiste Donatien de Vimeur, comte de Rochambeau, and his troops during the American Revolutionary War. In June 1781, the French troops under Rochambeau's command left Farmington and marched 13 miles (21 km) to their eighth camp through Connecticut, near Asa Barnes Tavern in the Marion section of Southington, now the Marion Historic District.

They camped there for four days. Rochambeau and his officers took shelter in the tavern, and the troops set up camp on a hill on the other side of the road. The area of the encampment has since become known as French Hill, and a marker on the east side of Marion Avenue commemorates the French campsite. According to Rev. Timlow's Sketches of Southington (1875), "Landlord Barnes gave a ball at his tavern, at which a large number of the young women of the vicinity were present; and they esteemed it something of an honor to have had a 'cotillion' with the polite foreigner." The celebrations-infused with spirits provided by Landlord Barnes-spanned the four nights they were in Southington. Rochambeau revisited Barnes's Tavern on the return march on October 27, 1782. According to Timlow, coins, buttons and other things were picked up in the vicinity many years after the two encampments. The Asa Barnes Tavern is now a private residence very near the camp site at 1089 Marion Avenue.

Southington originally was a small, rural farming community. In the early 1900s, Southington developed as a manufacturing center, but still maintained a very small population of a few thousand residents. Some of the products invented there include the first cement that was able to harden under water, the first carriage bolt cutting machine, the break-neck rat trap, and a new tinware process.

With the overall decline of industry in New England, and the construction of Interstate 84 in the mid 1960s, Southington developed into a bedroom community in which the town saw explosive growth and a population that has surged to over 42,000 today. 28% of the workers in Southington are still employed in manufacturing, most of them in the production of fabricated metals and aircraft.

In May 1942, during World War II, the town was selected by the War Department to be highlighted in a defense booklet called Southington, CT—Microcosm of America. Photographers roamed the community taking photos of residents at work, at play and in their homes and churches. The final publication was intended to show friends and foes alike in Europe the typical American citizens and families, their traditions and values. Thousands of copies were dropped from military airplanes over Europe during the Nazi German Occupation. Also in 1942 the mural, Romance of Southington, was painted in the town post office by Ann Hunt Spence. Murals were produced from 1934 to 1943 in the United States through the Section of Painting and Sculpture, later called the Section of Fine Arts, of the Treasury Department. The WPA was the largest and most ambitious American New Deal agency, employing individuals to carry out public works projects.

Each year, Southington is home to the Apple Harvest Festival, an effort to bring together local businesses and denizens from the area and surrounding cities. This has been a tradition of the town since 1969, generally spanning six weekdays and two weekends. Its highlights include a town parade, carnival rides and games, musical performances, and a wide selection of unique recipes and foods served by community cornerstones including the Boy Scouts of America, local churches, the Southington Fire Department and Police Department, the Southington Rotary Chapter, and the Southington Jaycees. Southington is home to several farms and apple orchards, including Rogers Orchards, the largest in the state.

On May 24, 1962, the town was heavily damaged by a high-end F3 tornado. The tornado, which was "near-F4" intensity at the time, damaged or destroyed numerous buildings, homes, businesses, and vehicles throughout the area before it dissipated northeast of town. Overall, the storm left one dead and 50 injured.

Two of Southington's main state roads are ceremonially named for notable residents. Southington's portion of Route 10 is named the Louis G. Tolles Memorial Highway for the late state Grange leader and legislator (1885–1956). The road was dedicated on August 6, 1960, and rededicated with new signs on October 6, 2007. A section of Route 364 (Oakland Road and Berlin Street) was dedicated as the Officer Timothy Foley Memorial Highway on September 11, 2009, in honor of the first Southington police officer killed in the line of duty. He died six days after being struck by a vehicle on December 30, 1937.

In January 2011, John Weichsel retired as town manager after 44 years. He was hired by the first Town Council when the council/manager form of government was established in town in 1966. His tenure as a town manager in the same community is one of the longest in the United States. Weichsel died in 2013. The municipal center at 196–200 North Main St. is named in his honor.

Southington ranked second nationally on an August 2023 Realtor.com list of hottest zip codes in the country, based on views of listings, how fast houses are selling and at what price.

Photos

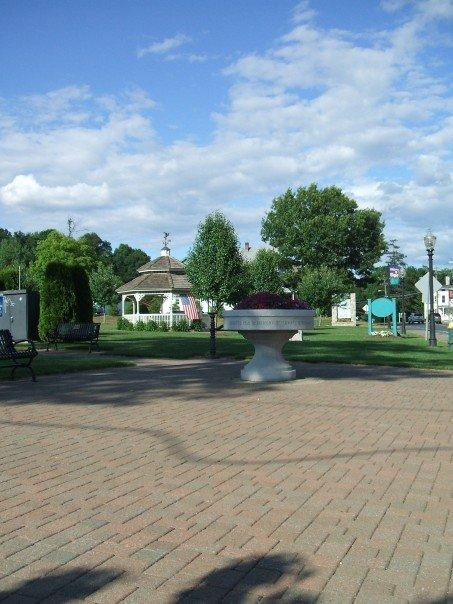
The Plantsville Green

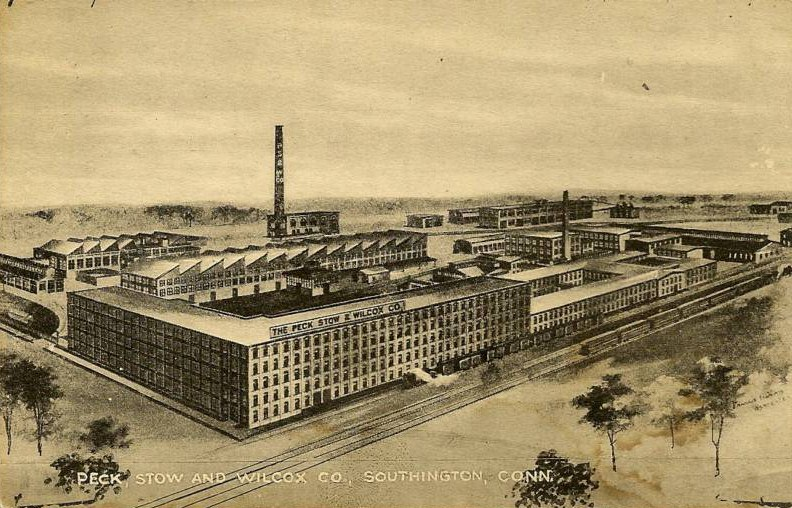
The Wilcox Factory located in Southington, in 1910.

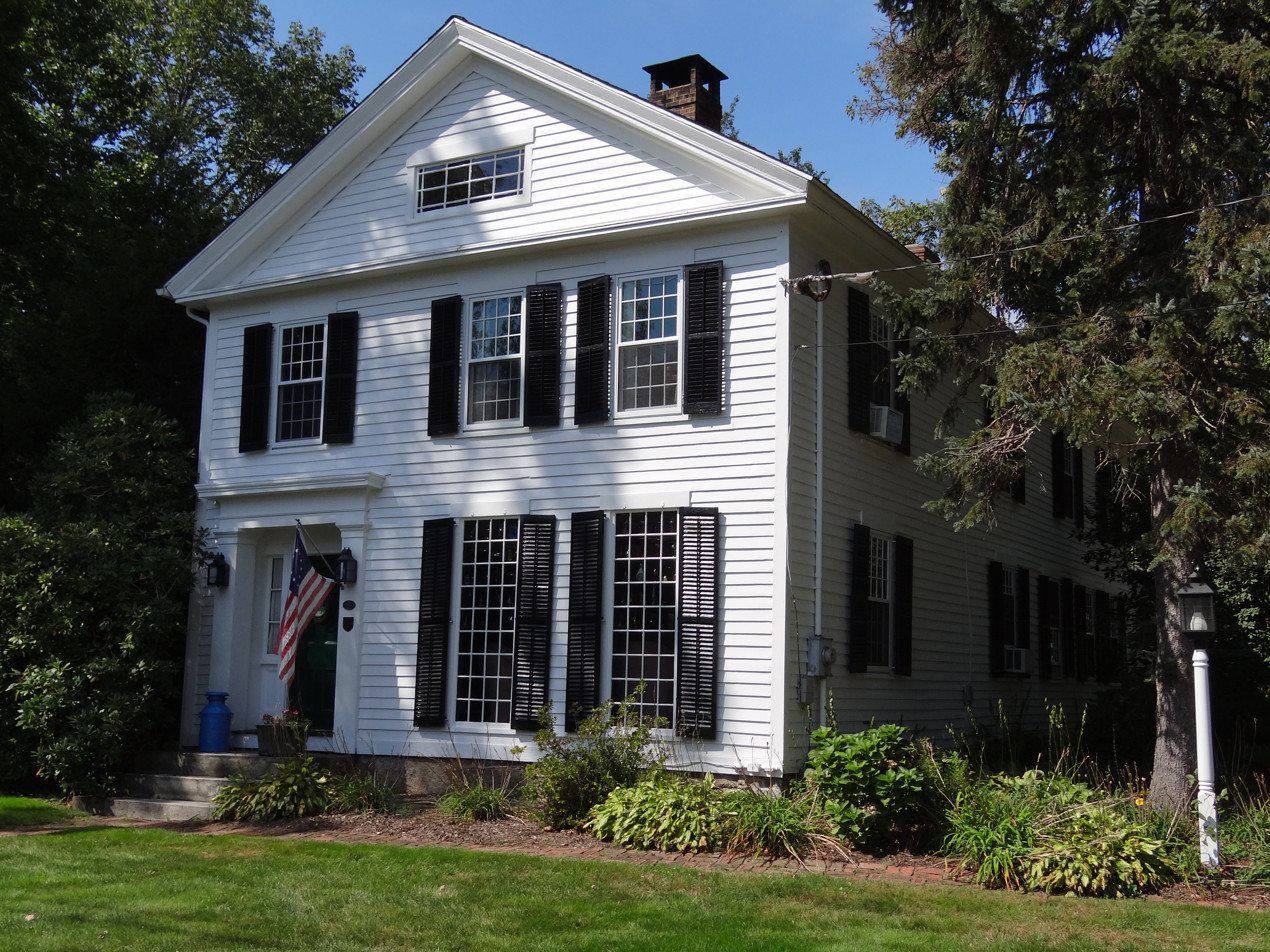
Levi B. Frost House, built in 1765

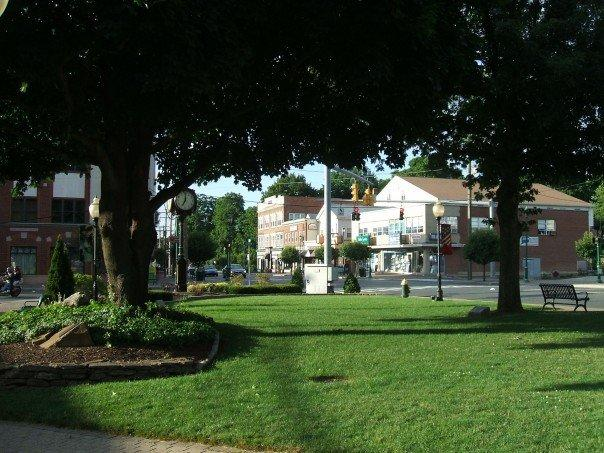
The town center

== Geography ==
Southington is situated about 20 miles (32 km) southwest of Hartford, about 80 miles (130 km) northeast of New York City, 105 miles (169 km) southwest of Boston and 77 miles (124 km) west of Providence. It includes the areas of Plantsville, Marion and Milldale, each of which has its own post office and distinct architecture. The town rests in a valley, with two mountains on its east and west sides. The town is located along exits 28 through 32 of Interstate 84, exits 5 through 7 of Interstate 691, and bisected by Route 10. Southington has the nickname of "The Apple Valley", due to the many orchards that still dot its landscape. The Quinnipiac River flows through the town. It is home to Mount Southington ski area, which has drawn visitors since the 1960s.

Southington is located at geographical coordinates 41° 35′ 48" North, 72° 52′ 40" West (41.596588, −72.87767). According to the United States Census Bureau, the town has a total area of 36.6 square miles (94.9 km^{2}), of which 35.9 square miles (93.0 km^{2}) are land and 0.73 square miles (1.9 km^{2}), or 1.99%, is water.

The Metacomet Ridge, a rugged trap rock mountain ridge that extends from Long Island Sound to the Massachusetts/Vermont border, passes through Southington. Notable peaks along the ridge form the eastern edge of town: Bradley Mountain, Ragged Mountain, Short Mountain, and part of the Hanging Hills. The ridge is traversed by the 51-mile-long (82 km) Metacomet Trail.

Southington's west ridge is rich with many geological formations. These include North Hamlin Brook, Roaring Brook, and Soltys Pond. Soltys Pond was named after Alexander Soltys, who settled in the area in 1713. The most well-known geological formation in the area is one of several in the world known as the Great Unconformity.

Located less than one mile northwest of the Great Unconformity on Southington Mountain is Hushak Rock, which has been known informally for decades as White Rock. The overlook has expansive views of the region and can be seen from much of Route 229 and area neighborhoods. The state of Connecticut officially named Hushak Rock in 2017 for longtime Southington civic leader and World War II pilot Walter J. Hushak (b. 1923).

== Demographics ==
Historical population
Census	Pop.	Note	%±
1820	2,681		—
1850	2,126		—
1860	3,315		55.9%
1870	4,314		30.1%
1880	5,411		25.4%
1890	5,501		1.7%
1900	5,890		7.1%
1910	6,516		10.6%
1920	8,440		29.5%
1930	9,237		9.4%
1940	9,649		4.5%
1950	13,061		35.4%
1960	22,797		74.5%
1970	30,946		35.7%
1980	36,879		19.2%
1990	38,518		4.4%
2000	39,728		3.1%
2010	43,069		8.4%
2020	43,501		1.0%
U.S. Decennial Census

As of the 2020 census, there were 43,501 people and 17,149 households in the town. The population density was 1,212 inhabitants per square mile (468/km^{2}). There were 18,154 housing units at an average density of 506 per square mile (195/km^{2}). The racial makeup of the town was 89.6% White, 2.4% Black or African American, 0.0% Native American, 2.9% Asian, 0.0% Pacific Islander, and 3.7% from two or more races. Hispanic or Latino of any race were 5.1% of the population.

As of 2010, there were 16,814 households, out of which 31.8% had children under the age of 18 living with them, 58.2% were married couples living together, 9.4% had a female householder with no husband present, and 28.8% were non-families. 24% of all households were made up of individuals, and 11.8% had someone living alone who was 65 years of age or older. The average household size was 2.54 and the average family size was 3.01.

In the town, the population was spread out, with 23.8% under the age of 18, 5.9% from 18 to 24, 29.3% from 25 to 44, 26.3% from 45 to 64, and 14.7% who were 65 years of age or older. The median age was 43.3 years. For every 100 females, there were 94.1 males. For every 100 females age 18 and over, there were 90.1 males.

As of 2015, the median income for a household in the town was $82,704, and the median income for a family was $102,775. Households in Southington were relatively affluent, with 41.9% of its households earning above $100,000. The per capita income for the town was $36,682 according to the 2010 census. Males had a median income of $68,378 versus $50,599 for females. About 2.2% of families and 3.5% of the population were below the poverty line, including 3.0% of those under age 18 and 5.6% of those age 65 or over.

== Economy ==
=== Top employers ===
Top employers in Southington according to the town's 2019 Comprehensive Annual Financial Report

#	Employer	# of Employees
1	Town of Southington	1,270
2	Hartford Healthcare	1,003
3	Webster Bank	648
4	Southington YMCA	552
5	Connecticut On-Line Computer Company	432
6	Yarde Metals	370
7	Smith's Medical (Medex)	271
8	Aqua Turf	200
9	Walmart	175
10	Economy Spring	175

=== Revitalization ===
As industry in the area declined, many old factories and buildings were left vacant. The latest to close was Ideal Forging, which filed for bankruptcy in 2001 and vacated its building in the town center. In 2005, Meridian Development Partners of New York City purchased the land with plans to transform the former factory site into homes and retail space. Demolition of the factory began in October 2014, but the project was later abandoned because of the high cost necessary to decontaminate the soil. As of 2023, preparations have begun for a new attempt at developing the space. The soil decontamination for the most recent plan has been subsidised by the EPA, the state, and the town.

Southington has taken the initiative to spur its own revitalization. In 2002, the town completed the downtown renaissance project. This project replaced the sidewalks on Main Street and Center Street with granite curbing and brick paving stones. Lifelong resident and philanthropist Robert Petroske donated $50,000 to the revitalization effort which led to the installation of decorative iron lamp posts, benches, and garbage cans. Flowering trees were planted, and a former fountain and light fixture was restored and relocated from Recreation Park (where it had been moved in 1961) to the town center. A renaissance zone was created where private business owners in the zone could apply to the town to continue the project of granite, brick pavers, and lamp posts, of which the town would pay the difference of replacement concrete sidewalks versus the more expensive brick. The extension of brick pavers from Center Street to a section on the east side of Liberty Street was completed in July 2008 to connect with the pavers installed outside the new Liberty Square office building.

The town water department, which built a new facility on West Queen Street in 2002, demolished its former facility located between Mill and High streets in June 2008 and developed the land into a landscaped park, along with a continuation of the sidewalks, iron fences and decorative lamp posts. The old water facility abuts the linear walking trail.

== Arts and culture ==
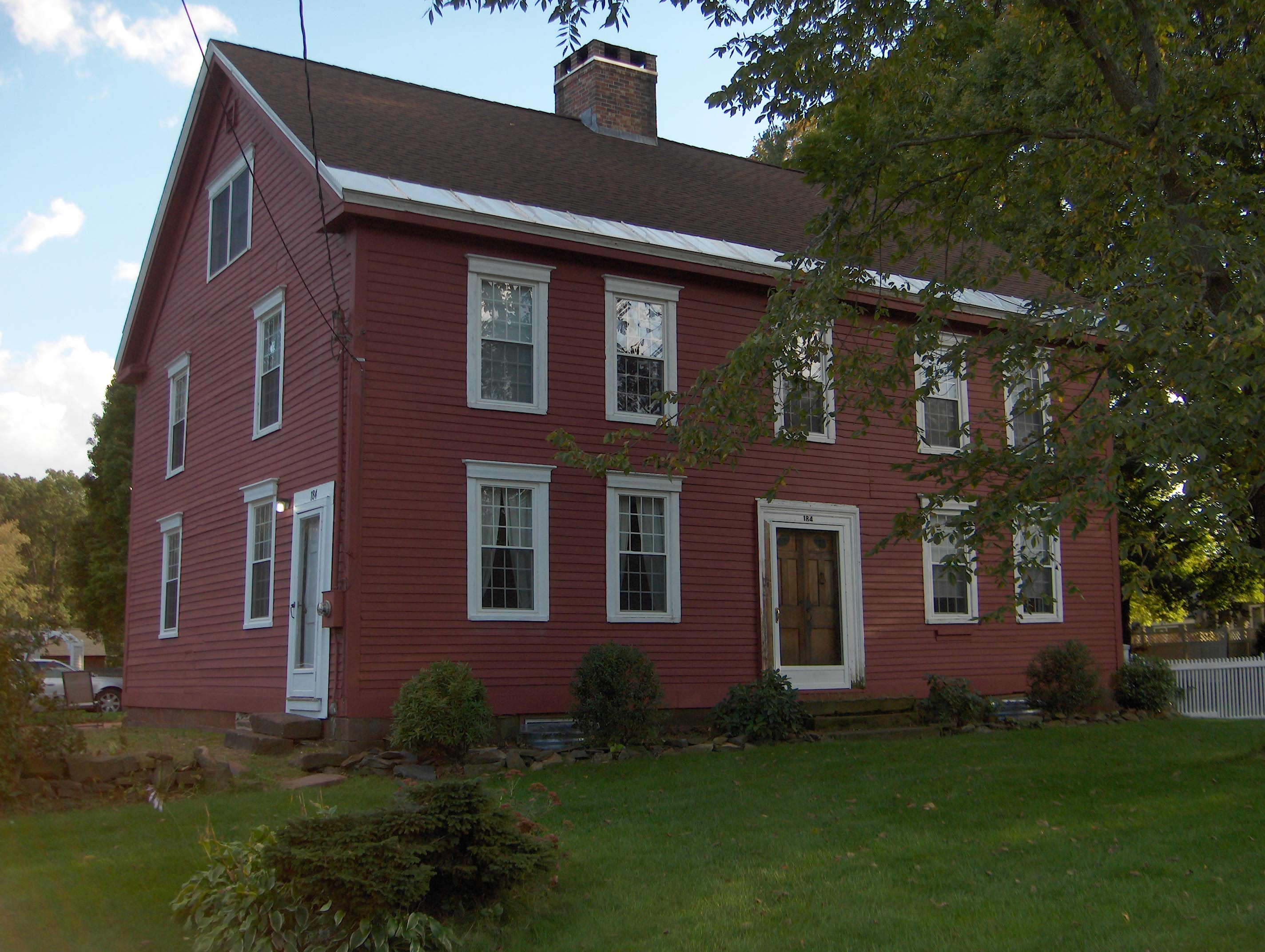
Capt. Josiah Cowles House, built c. 1750

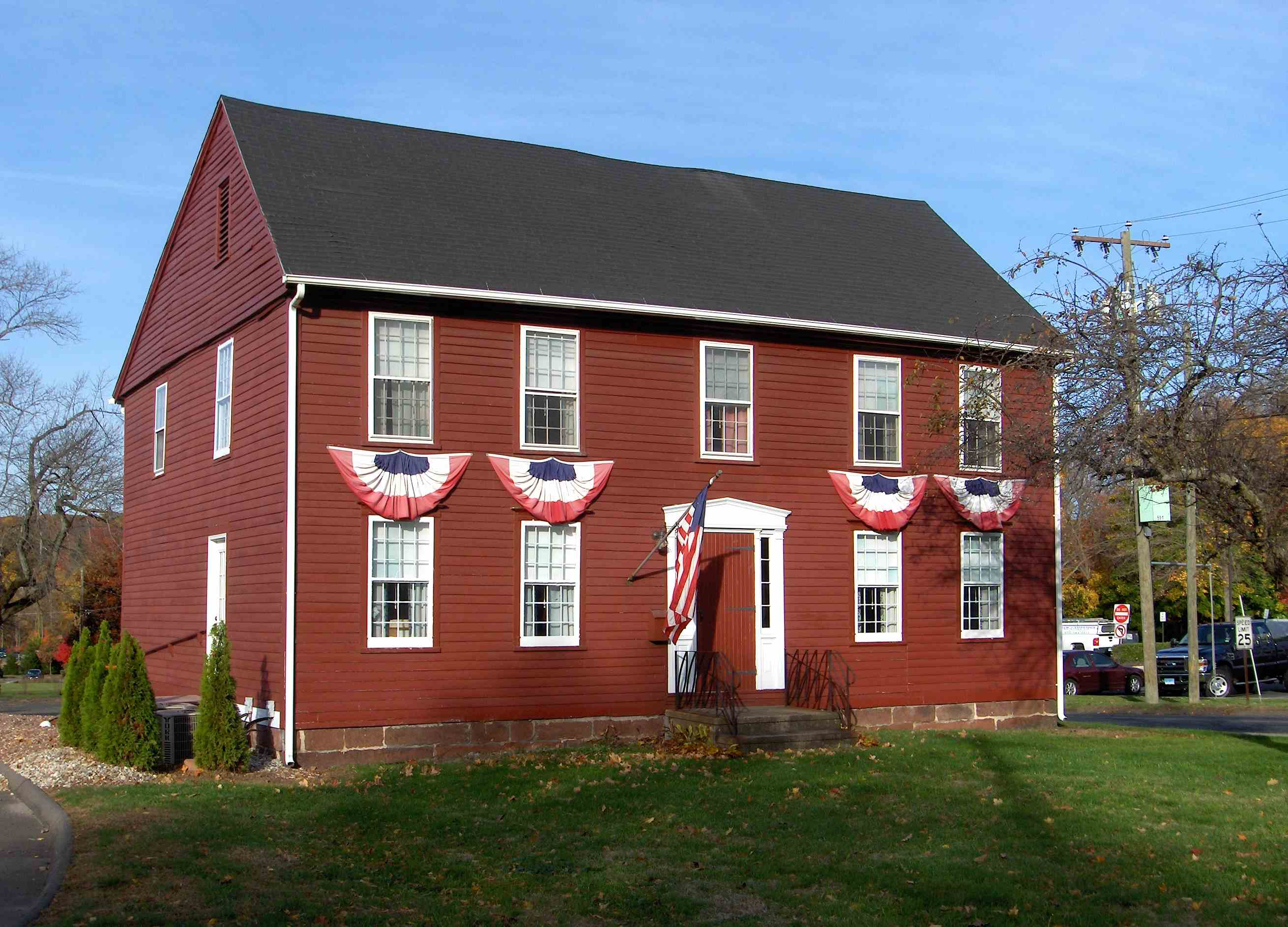
Jonathan Root House, built c. 1720

There are numerous houses and districts in Southington that are listed on the National Register of Historic Places, including:

- Luman Andrews House
- Atwater Manufacturing Company
- Asa Barnes Tavern
- Selah Barnes House
- Barnes-Frost House
- Blakeslee Forging Company
- Icabod Bradley House
- Clark Brothers Factory No. 1
- Clark Brothers Factory No. 2
- Avery Clark House
- Capt. Josiah Cowles House
- Ebenezer Evans House
- Farmington Canal-New Haven and Northampton Canal
- Stephen Grannis House
- Timothy Hart House
- House at 1010 Shuttle Meadow Road
- House at 590 West Street
- Hurwood Company
- Lake Compounce Carousel
- Marion Historic District
- Meriden Avenue-Oakland Road Historic District
- Roswell Moore II House
- Peck, Stow & Wilcox Factory
- Plantsville Historic District
- Dr. J. Porter House
- Pultz & Walkley Company
- Jonathan Root House
- Dr. Henry Skelton House
- H. D. Smith Company Building
- Southington Center Historic District
- Southington Public Library
- Horace Webster Farmhouse
- West Street School
- Rev. John Wightman House
- Valentine Wightman House
- Woodruff House
- Capt. Samuel Woodruff House
- Ezekiel Woodruff House
- Jotham Woodruff House
- Urbana Woodruff House

== Parks and recreation ==
Southington has a fair share of large parks and open land, each serving several outdoor activities.

=== Linear walking trail ===
The linear trail opened to the public in the summer of 2003. This trail was built over the town's old rail line which had ceased operation several years earlier. Dubbed the Farmington Canal Greenway, when completed it will stretch from New Haven, Connecticut, to Northampton, Massachusetts, following the route of the historical Farmington Canal. The second phase of construction on the trail, which officially opened in 2011, redeveloped the old train line from Plantsville center to the Cheshire town line.

The project has brought landscaping, iron benches, and intersections of brick pavers where the trail crosses roads. This is seen as a major link for the further revitalization of downtown Southington and Plantsville. Eventually the trail will connect with the Cheshire-to-New Haven route.

=== Lake Compounce ===
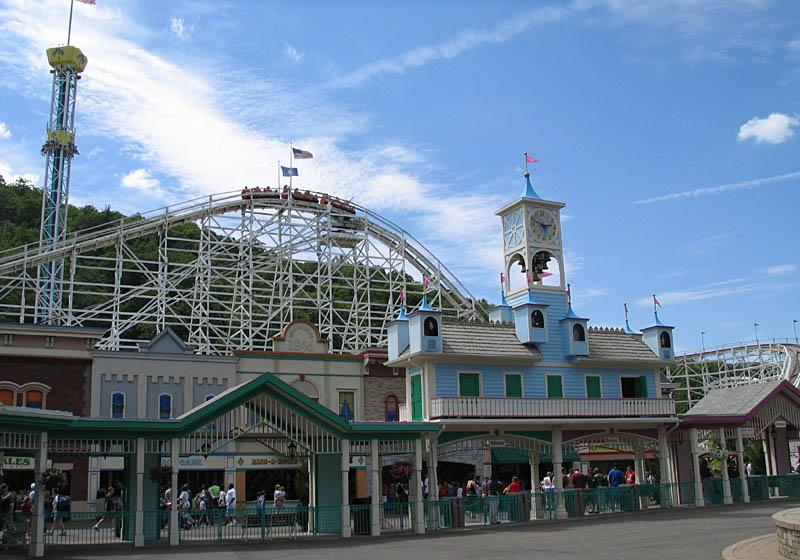
Main entrance to Lake Compounce amusement park

Lake Compounce, an amusement park founded in 1846, is located partially in Southington, as well as neighboring Bristol. Lake Compounce is considered the oldest continuously-operating amusement park in the United States.

=== Public parks ===
- Crescent Lake
- Panthorn Park
- Recreation Park
- Southington Dog Park
- Soltys Pond
- Southington Little League Fields
- Veterans Memorial Park

=== Recreation ===
- Mount Southington Ski Resort
- Southington Country Club
- Hawks Landing Country Club
- Metacomet Trail
- Ragged Mountain
- Southington Community YMCA
- Lake Compounce

== Government ==
In state government, Southington is divided into the following districts for the Connecticut House of Representatives: 22, 30, 80, and 81; it is part of District 16 for the Connecticut Senate.

At the federal level, Southington is located in Connecticut's 1st congressional district. The district's current Representative is John B. Larson, a Democrat.

Locally, the Town of Southington has a form of government known as Council-Manager Government. It consists of a nine-member Town Council, elected every odd year through an at-large popular vote. Due to state minority representation laws, a maximum of six nominees from each party can run. The nine candidates who receive the most votes become councillors. The council appoints a nonpartisan full-time administrator, known as the Town Manager.

Voters also elect a municipal Planning and Zoning Commission (four year terms), Board of Education (two year terms), Board of Finance (two year terms), Water Commission (two year terms), Town Clerk (six year term) and Registrar of Voters (four term term).

Voter registration and party enrollment
Party	Active voters	Inactive voters	Total voters	Percentage
Republican	9,221	275	9,496	27.77%
Democratic	8,507	251	8,758	25.61%
Unaffiliated	14,831	506	15,337	44.85%
Minor Parties	580	26	606	1.77%
Total	33,139	1,058	34,197	100%

== Education ==
Southington has eight public elementary schools, two middle schools and one high school. It also has an alternative school for children in grades 8–12 called the Karen Smith Academy. Approximately 6,500 students are enrolled in Southington public schools, making it one of the larger districts in the state of Connecticut. Southington High School has a growing enrollment exceeding 2,200 students, of which 90% of graduates attend post-secondary education.

Due to Southington's popularity as a family suburb, the town has undertaken plans to expand all schools to accommodate the growing enrollment. Three elementary schools have been completed, and a new building and second cafeteria has been added to the high school campus. In 2012, voters approved expansion and renovations to two other elementary schools (with one to be demolished and rebuilt), as well as to the two middle schools.

Southington also has two parochial schools; Southington Catholic is pre-kindergarten through eighth and the other, Central Christian Academy is pre-kindergarten through twelfth.

=== Elementary schools ===
- Walter A. Derynoski (formerly Central High)
- Flanders
- William H. Hatton
- Urbin T. Kelley
- Zaya A. Oshana (renamed June 2019; formerly Plantsville School)
- South End
- William M. Strong
- Reuben E. Thalberg

=== Middle schools ===
- Joseph A. DePaolo
- John F. Kennedy

=== High schools ===
- Southington High School
- Karen Smith Academy (formerly Southington Alternative Education or ALTA)

=== Parochial schools ===
- Southington Catholic (Pre-K–8) – formerly St. Thomas School (Pre-K–8) & Saint Dominic School (Pre-K–5)
- Central Christian Academy (Pre-K–12)

=== Colleges ===
- New England Baptist College

== Infrastructure ==
=== Transportation ===
==== Buses ====
On March 28, 2015, CTfastrak, Connecticut's first bus rapid transit corridor, opened. It provides a separated right-of-way between Hartford and New Britain; Express bus services travel between downtown Hartford and Waterbury, with service to Southington, with its free park-and-ride located at the corner of South Main and Mulberry streets. Following its creation, public transportation can now connect Southington residents to Waterbury station and the Metro-North Railroad, providing service to Bridgeport and ultimately Stamford and New York City.

In 2024, CT Transit introduced the new route 532, running up and down Queen Street and into Plainville.

==== Highways ====
Southington is home to several highways, including Interstate 84, also known as The Yankee Expressway, and Interstate 691.

== Notable people ==
- John Anderson (born 1965), SportsCenter anchor
- Jim Aparo (1932–2005), comic book artist for DC Comics
- Tom Cichowski (1944–2015), football player
- Vince Clements (born 1949), professional football player 1972–1973, NY Giants
- Jonathan Coachman (born 1972), "Sportscenter" anchor and former WWE authority figure
- Ann Dandrow (1936–2017), educator and politician
- Chris Denorfia (born 1980), baseball player
- Rob Dibble (born 1964), baseball player, talk show host
- Marcus H. Holcomb (1844–1932), Governor of Connecticut
- Lisa Robin Kelly (1970–2013), actress
- Ellen Olney Kirk (1842–1928), novelist
- Aaron Lipstadt born 1952, film director and producer
- Mansfield Merriman (1848–1925), civil engineer, educator, and writer
- Alwin Nikolais (1910–1993), choreographer
- Jesse Olney (1798–1872), geographer
- Carl Pavano (born 1976), baseball player
- Tom Poitras (born 1968), head soccer coach at the University of Hartford
- Delando Pratt (1823–1874), member of the Wisconsin State Assembly
- Sal Romano (born 1993), baseball player
- Joel Root (1770–1847), author of a journal of a voyage around the world (1802–1806) while working as supercargo on the sealing ship Huron
- John H. Swift (1840–1911), member of the New York State Assembly
- Joseph Twichell (1838–1918), writer and minister
- Andrew Upson (1825–1864), American politician
- Logan West (born 1994), Miss Teen USA 2012
- Charles Whittlesey (1808–1886), geologist
- Dale Zarrella, sculptor
- Marie Catharine Neal, botanist

== Pictures ==
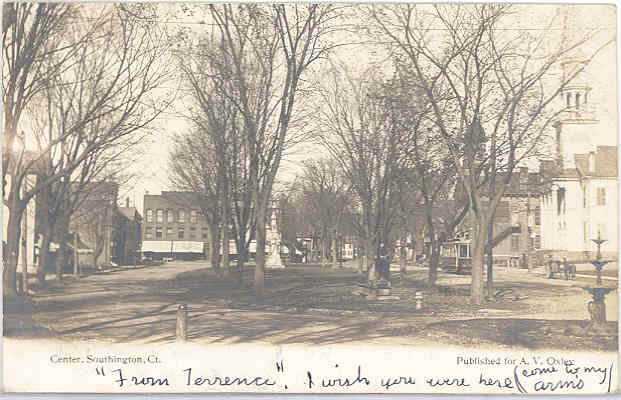
Southington center, c. 1909

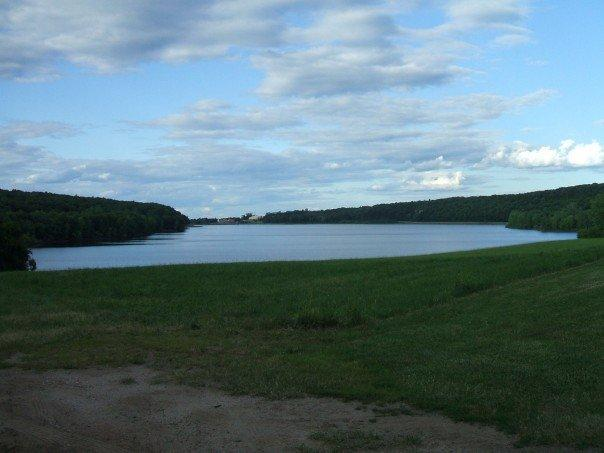
Southington Reservoir

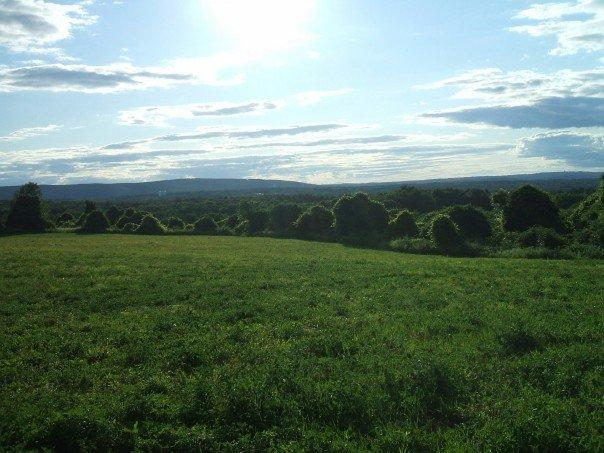
Southington's Rolling Hills

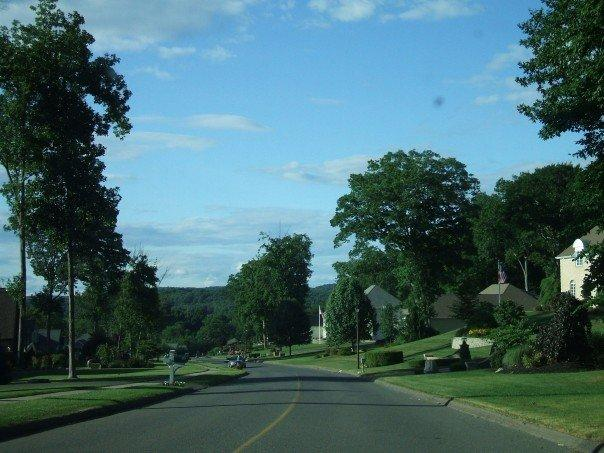
A typical neighborhood in Southington

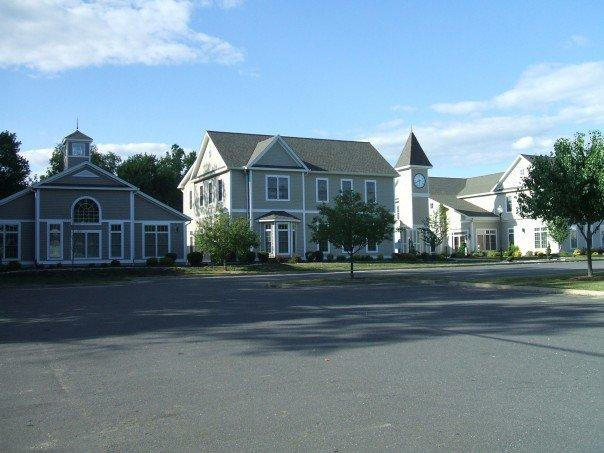
Southington Clock Tower Square

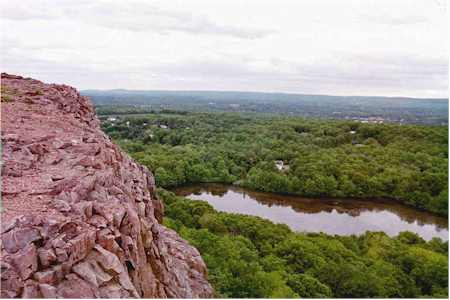
Ragged Mountain overlooking the town.
