= Delando Pratt =

American politician

Delando Pratt was a member of the Wisconsin State Assembly.

== Biography ==
Pratt was born in Southington, Connecticut in 1823. He was married to Imogene Pratt and they had at least two children. Pratt died in Platteville, Wisconsin in 1874.

== Career ==
Pratt represented Sauk County, Wisconsin in the Assembly during the 1848 session. He was a Democrat.
