= Southington Center Historic District =

Historic district in Connecticut, United States

- U.S. National Register of Historic Places
- U.S. Historic district
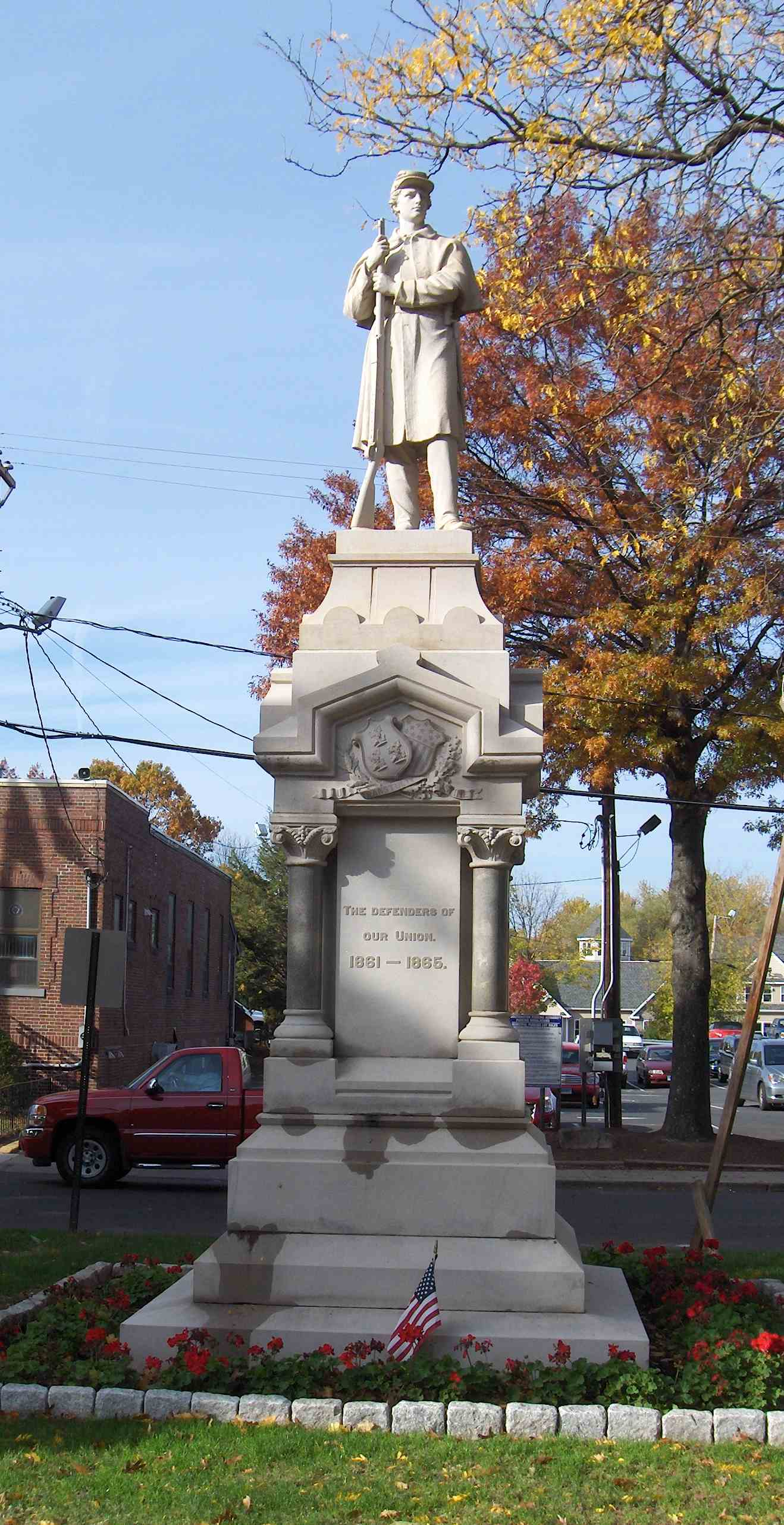
- Civil War monument

- Location within Connecticut Location within the United States
- Location: Roughly North Main Street North from Vermont Avenue, and Berlin Street from Main Street to Academy Lane, Southington, Connecticut
- Coordinates: 41°36′12″N 72°52′41″W
- Area: 58 acres (23 ha)
- Architect: Campbell, Lauren T.
- Architectural style: Late 19th And 20th Century Revivals, Greek Revival, Late Victorian
- NRHP reference No.: 88002961
- Added to NRHP: May 08, 1989

The Southington Center Historic District is a National Register of Historic Places district covering a major portion of the center of Southington, Connecticut. The area includes a considerable number of resources, many of which are buildings, commercial, governmental, religious and residential, but the list also includes monuments, and the town green. The district was added to the National Register in 1989.

Many of the buildings in the district date to Colonial times. Southington became a town in 1779, but European settlers first came to the area in 1698. Many of the commercial, religious and government buildings lie along Main or North Main, on either side of the town green. There are some residential buildings on the two main streets, but the majority of the residential buildings are on Vermont and Berlin streets, adjacent to Main Street.

== Monuments ==
The district includes four monuments, each of which is located on the town green, in the center of town. The monuments are:

- A Civil War monument
- A World War I monument
- A World War II- Korea - Vietnam monument
- A granite fountain commemorating Amon Bradley, a 19th-century industrialist.

== Residences ==
One of the oldest residences in town is that of Jonathan Root, whose house was used both as a dwelling and a tavern. This building is within the district, but is also separately listed on the National Register of Historic Places.

The Cyrus C. Chamberlain House, at 114 Main Street, is an example of a residential building in the center of town. It was built in 1823, in the Federal style.

== Commercial, religious and governmental ==
The Congregational Church, at 37 Main Street, was built between 1828 and 1832 in the Federal style. The Federal Post Office, at 125 Main street, dates to 1939, although it has an addition built in 1964. The style is Georgian Revival.

== Gallery ==
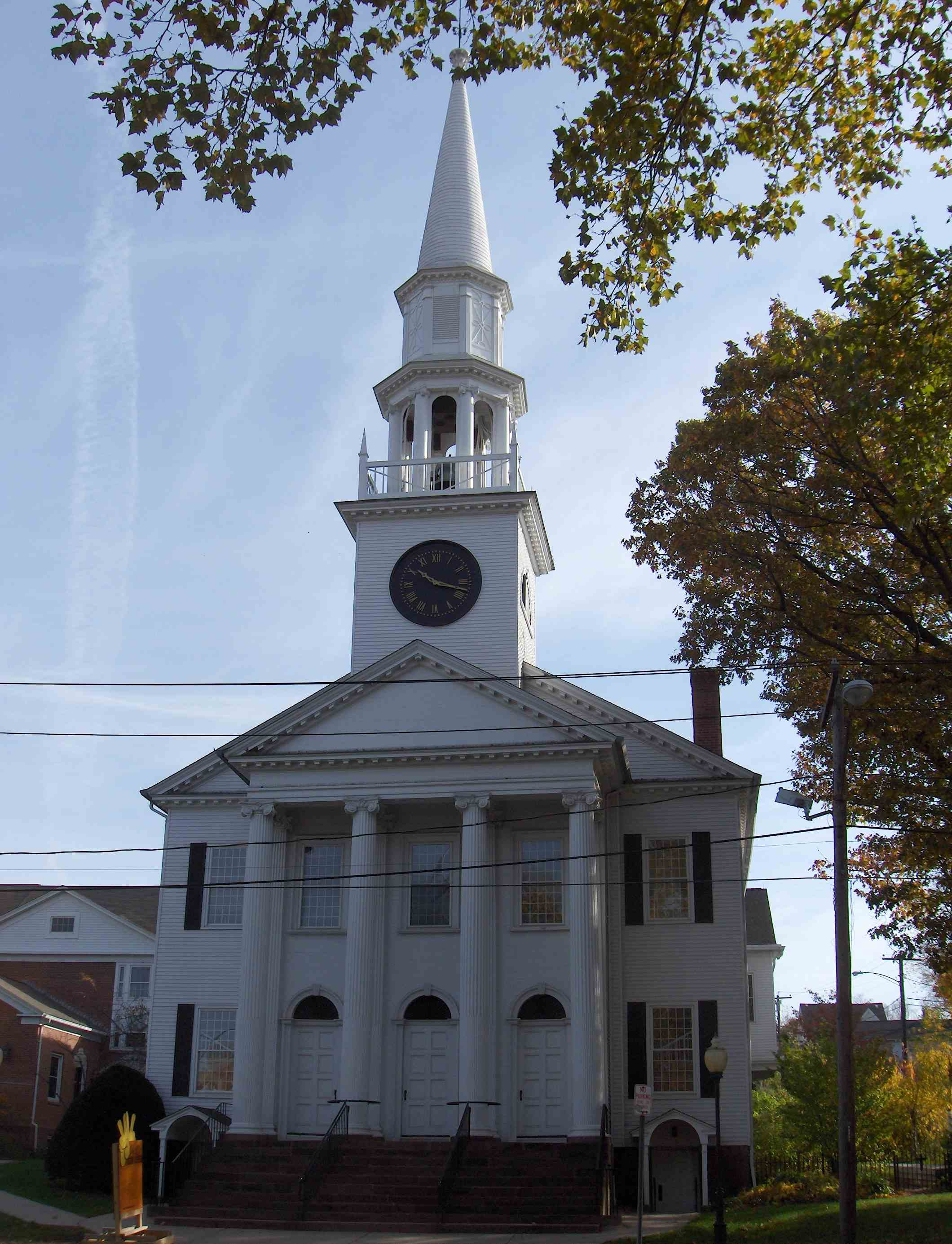
Congregational Church

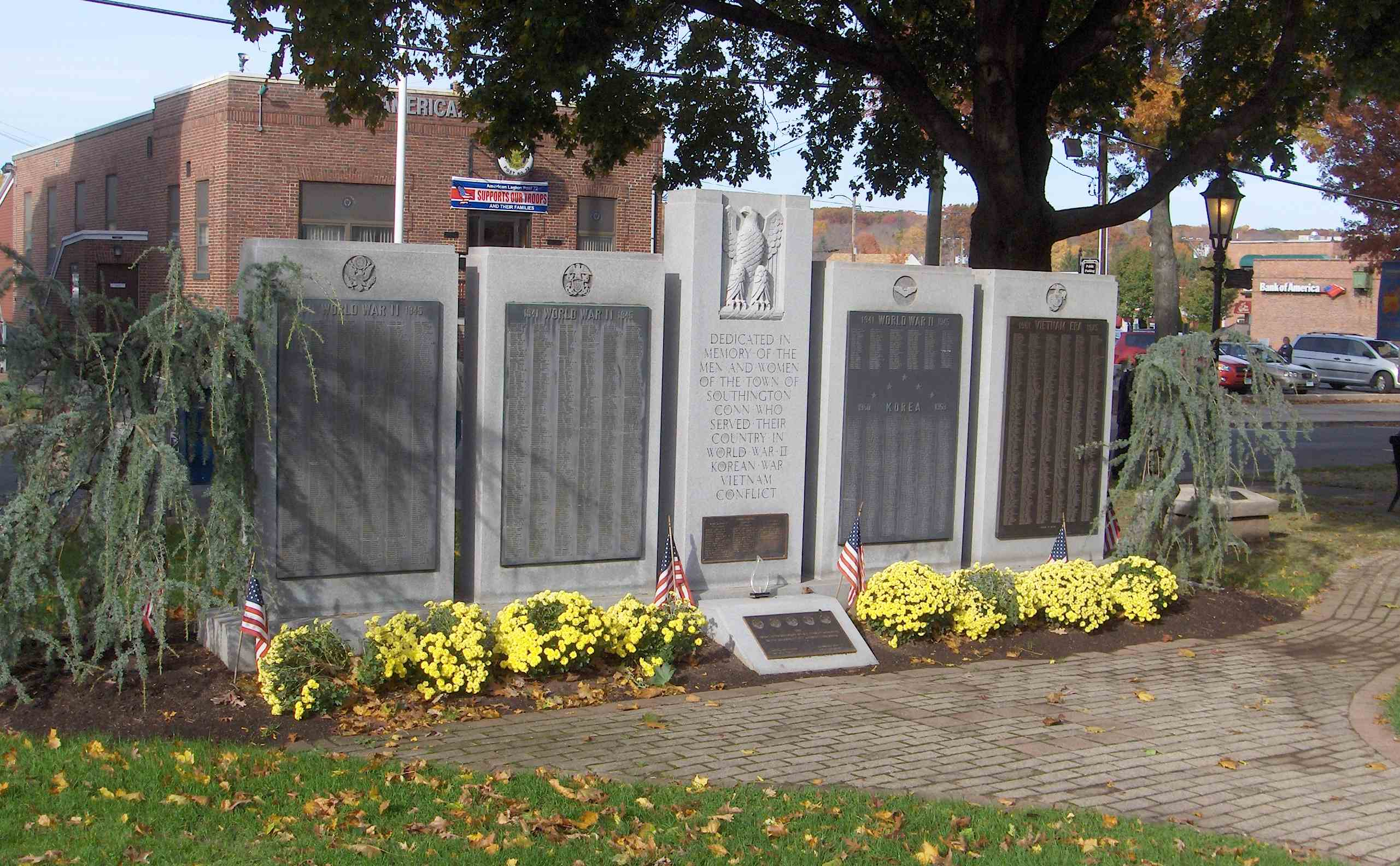
World War II-Korea-Vietnam monument

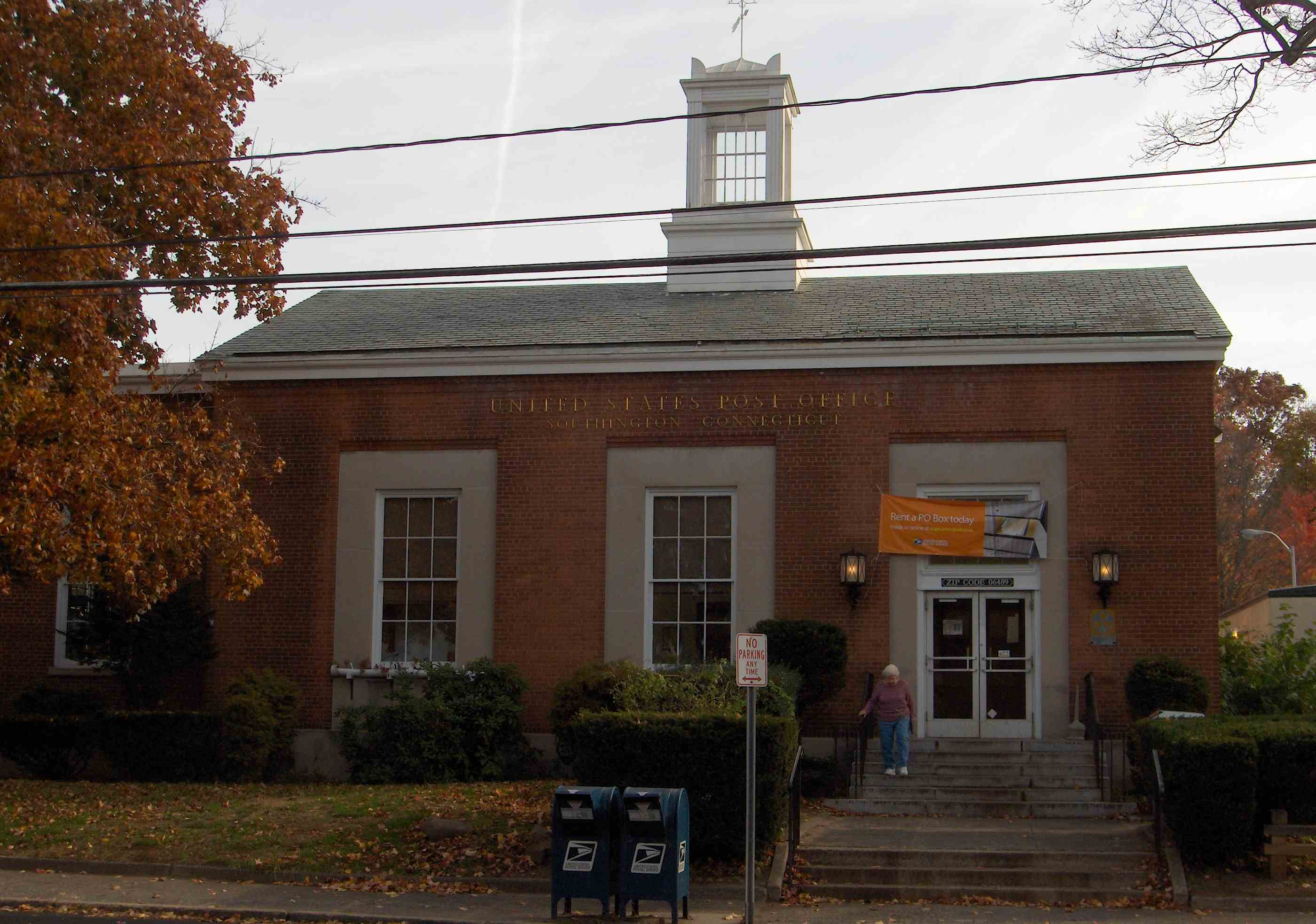
US Post Office

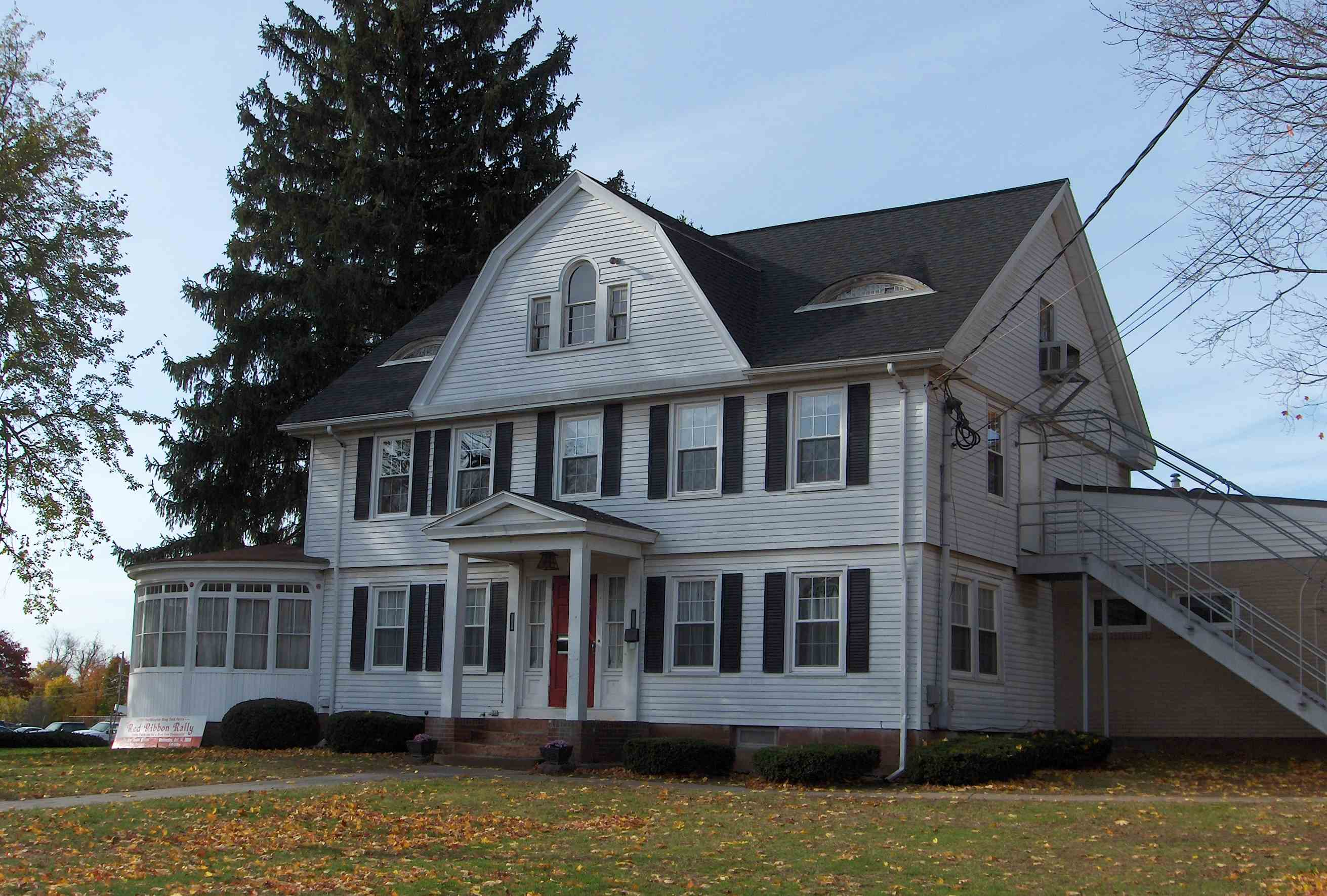
Cyrus C. Chamberlain House

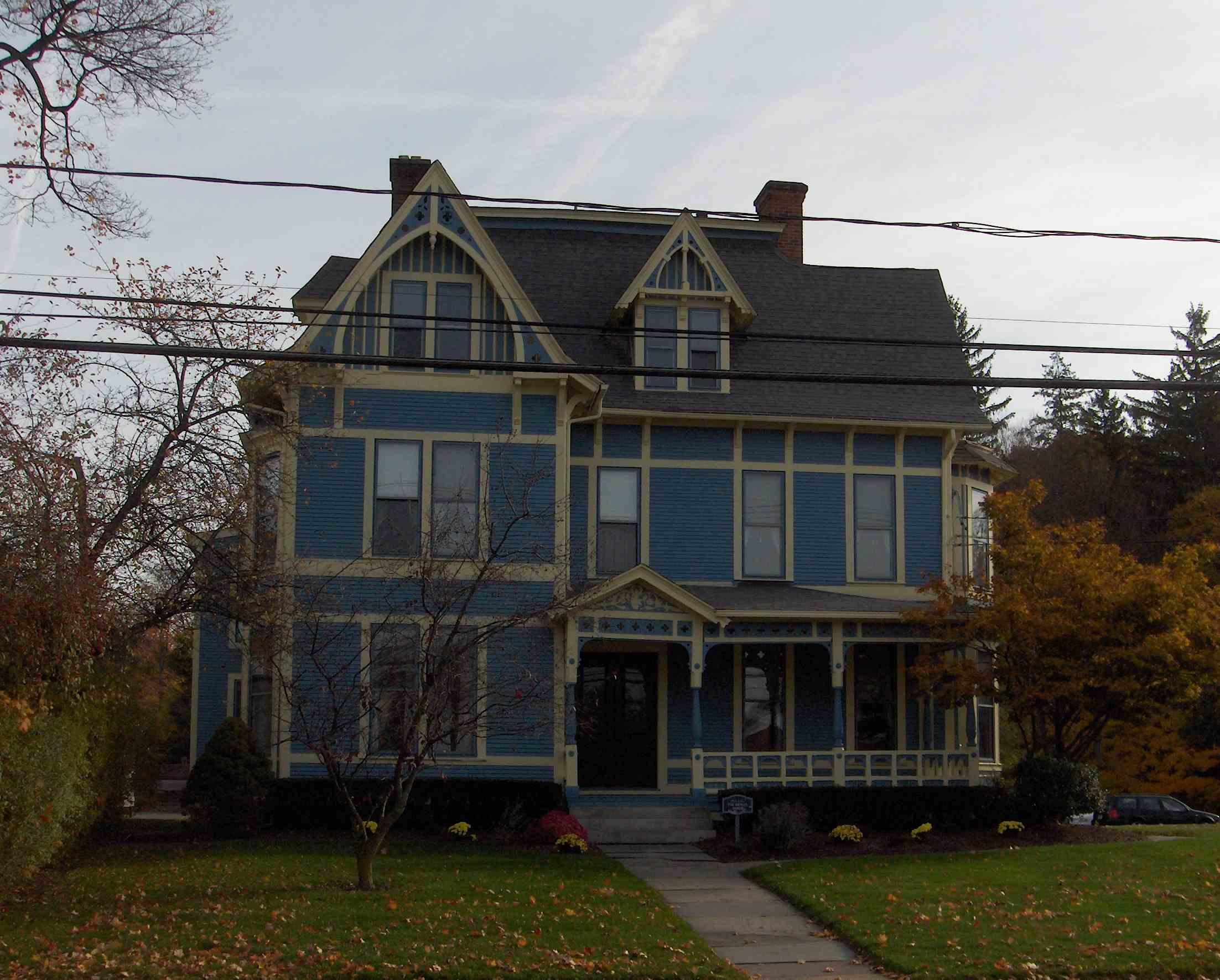
Marcellus B. Willcox House

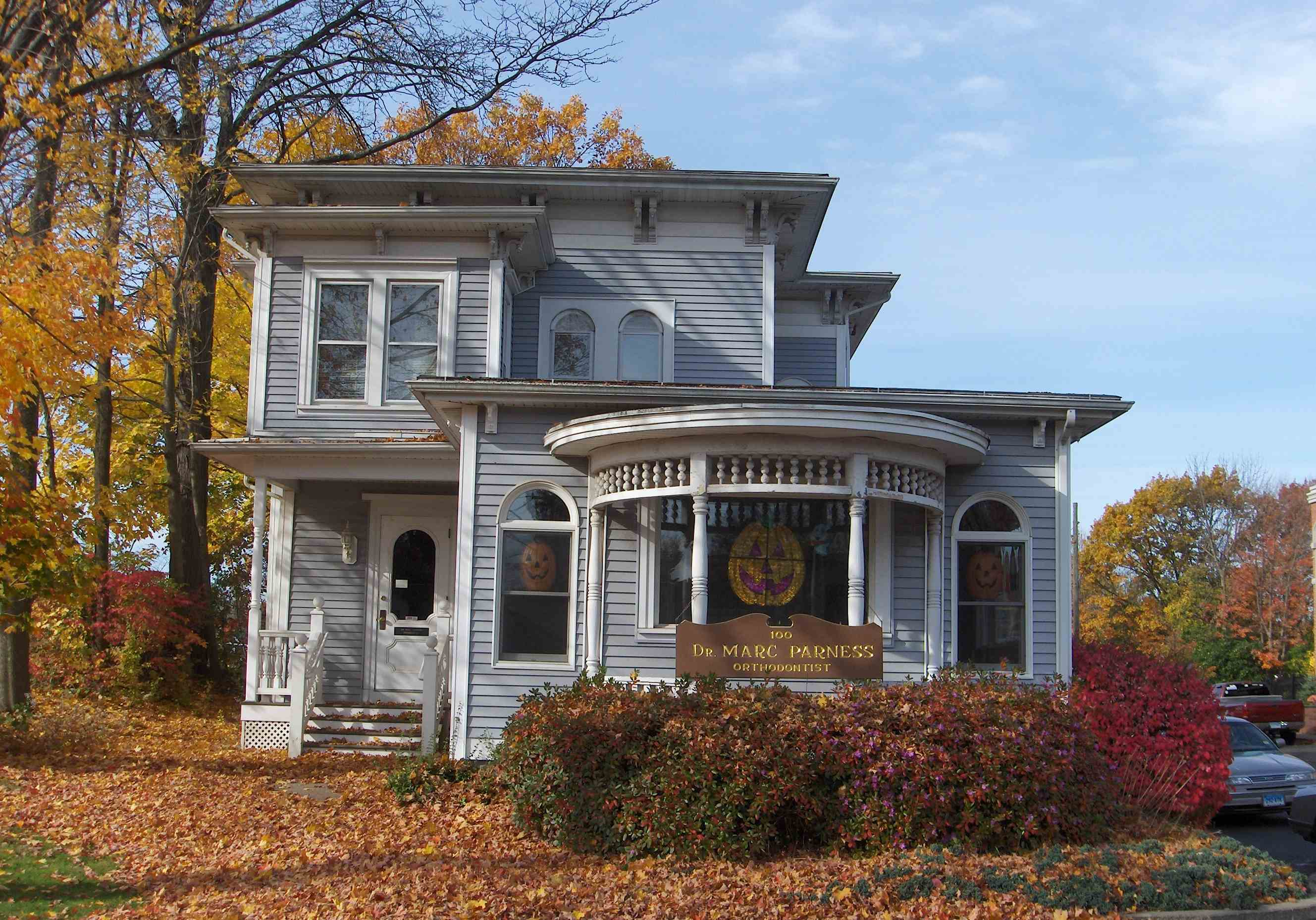
Truman E. Barnes House

== See also ==
- National Register of Historic Places listings in Southington, Connecticut
