= Peck, Stow & Wilcox Factory =

- U.S. National Register of Historic Places
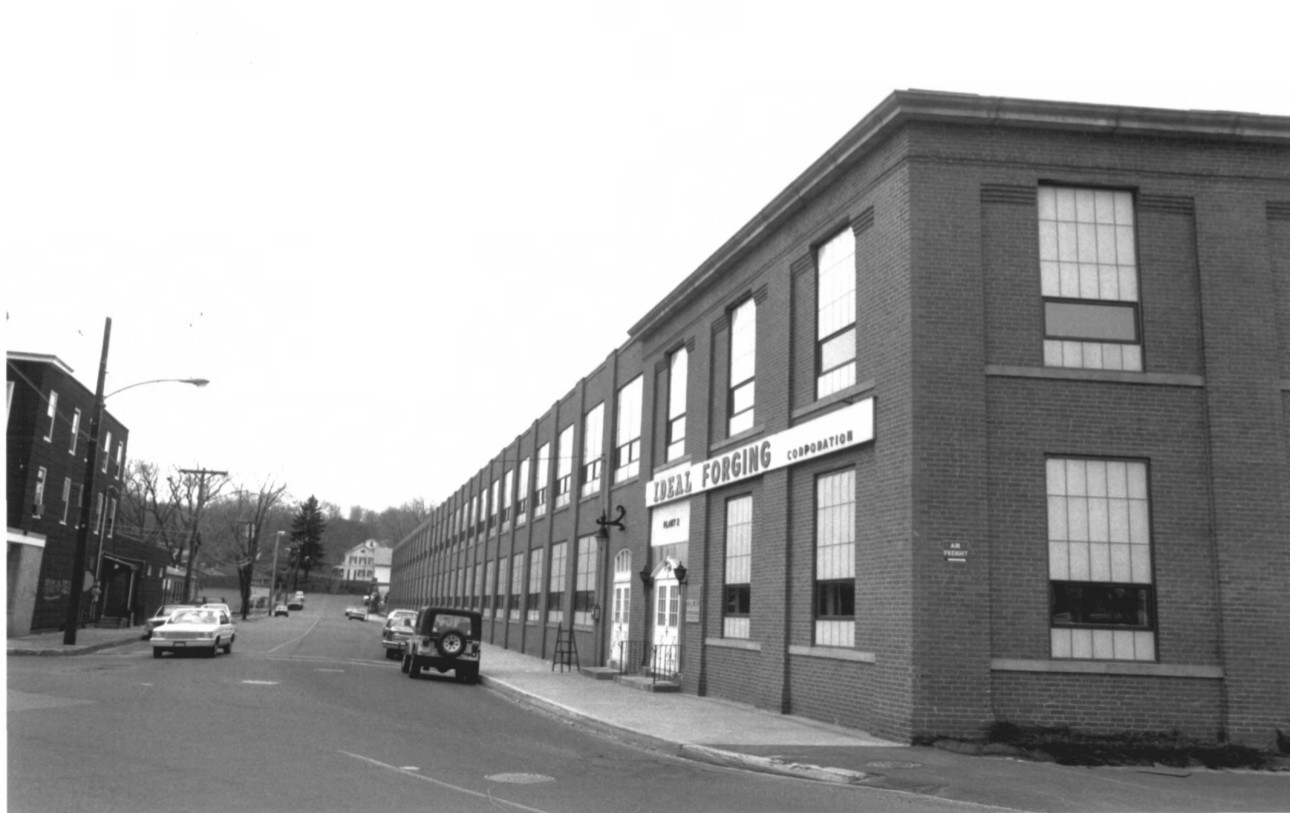
- 1988 photo

- Location within Connecticut Location within the United States
- Location: 217 Center Street, Southington, Connecticut
- Coordinates: 41°36′8″N 72°52′59″W
- Area: 0.6 acres (0.24 ha)
- Built: 1912
- Architectural style: Industrial vernacular
- MPS: Historic Industrial Complexes of Southington TR
- NRHP reference No.: 88002682
- Added to NRHP: December 8, 1988

The Peck, Stow & Wilcox Factory was a historic factory complex at 217 Center Street in Southington, Connecticut. Begun in 1870, it was home to the town's largest industrial employer of the late 19th century. Surviving elements of the factory, dating to 1912, were listed on the National Register of Historic Places in 1989. The complex was demolished in 2015 after it was shuttered in 2003.

== Description and history ==
The former Peck, Stow & Wilcox Factory complex was located west of the town center of Southington, and occupied most of a block bounded by Center, Water, and Mill Streets, and the railroad right-of-way now occupied by the Farmington Canal Heritage Trail. When it was described in 1989 for the National Register, its main buildings were a large forge with a sawtooth roof, and an equally large annealing building. These two were accompanied by an assortment of smaller one and two-story brick buildings. Buildings already demolished at that time included the company's original 1870 plant.

Peck, Stow & Wilcox was founded in 1870 by the merger of three different industrial tool manufacturers specializing in tin-processing equipment. The company grew rapidly, and was by 1890 producing a diversified array of tools. It was also the town's largest employer, its business leadership occupying positions of influence in the town's civic, social, and political spheres. The plant was substantially enlarged in 1912, which is the period when most of the buildings surviving in 1989 were built. By that time, the complex was operated by Ideal Forging. That company went bankrupt in 2003, and the plant was acquired by real estate developers not long afterward. Demolition of the premises took place in 2015, after hazardous materials were removed.

Peck, Stow & Wilcox also operated a plant in Cleveland, Ohio.

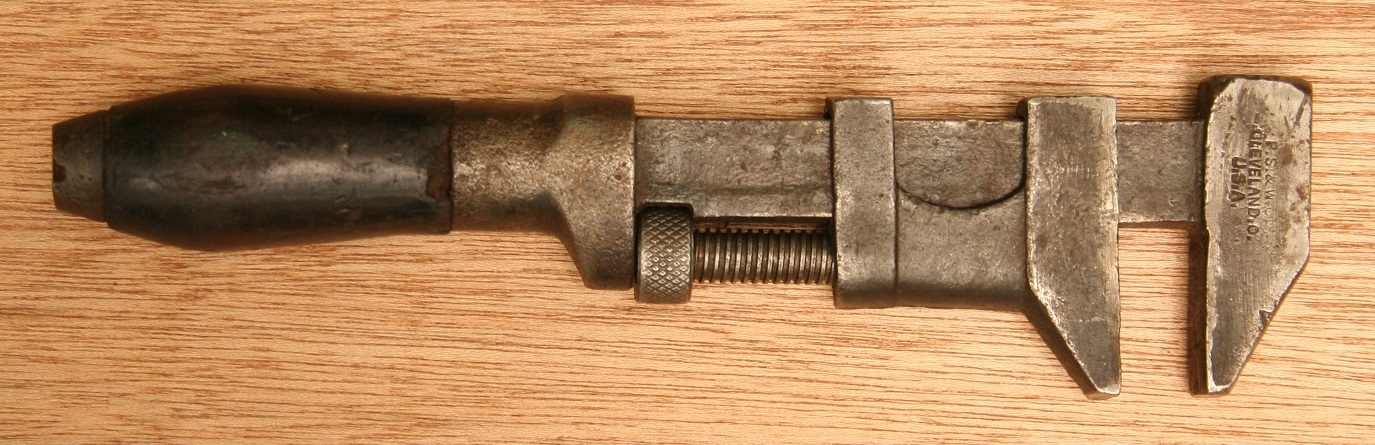
A monkey wrench marked with "P.S. & W, Cleveland, Ohio" (late 1800s or early 1900s).

== See also ==
- National Register of Historic Places listings in Southington, Connecticut
