= Rev. John Wightman House =

Historic house in Connecticut, United States

- U.S. National Register of Historic Places
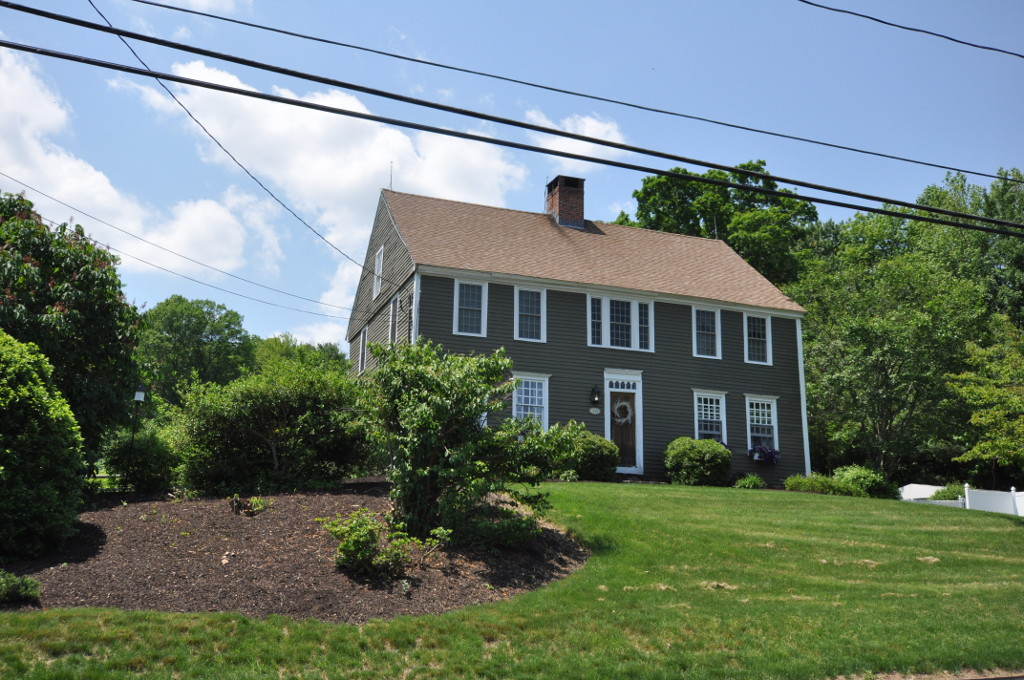

- Location within Connecticut Location within the United States
- Location: 1024 Mount Vernon Road, Southington, Connecticut
- Coordinates: 41°35′56.8″N 72°55′31.3″W
- Area: 3 acres (1.2 ha)
- Built: 1770
- Architectural style: Colonial, New England Colonial
- MPS: Colonial Houses of Southington TR
- NRHP reference No.: 88003111
- Added to NRHP: January 19, 1989

Rev. John Wightman House is a historic American colonial house at 1024 Mount Vernon Road in Southington, Connecticut. It was built about 1770 for the town's second Baptist minister, and is a good local example of Georgian architecture. It was added to the National Register of Historic Places in 1989.

== Description and history ==
The Rev. John Wightman House is located in western Southington, on the west side of Mount Vernon Road north of its junction with West Center Street. It is a 2 1/2-story wood-frame structure, with a gabled roof, central chimney, and clapboarded exterior. Its front facade is five bays wide, with a symmetrical arrangement of windows around a center entry. Upper floor windows are butted against the eave, with a narrow band of dentil moulding, while ground floor windows and the entrance are topped by slightly projecting and splayed lintels. The entrance flanked by narrow moulding and has a transom window with five panes in the shape of a tombstone. Above the entrance is a three-part window with narrow side windows. The interior is architecturally distinguished, and there is a later ell extending to the rear.

John Wightman was an itinerant Baptist minister who purchased this parcel of land in 1770, and is presumed to have the house built soon afterward. He became the second settled minister for a small congregation of Baptist families. He is buried in a small cemetery nearby, and was succeeded by his son Valentine, whose house stood further north on Mount Vernon Road.

== See also ==
- National Register of Historic Places listings in Southington, Connecticut
