= Josiah Cowles House =

Historic house in Connecticut, United States

- Capt. Josiah Cowles House
- U.S. National Register of Historic Places
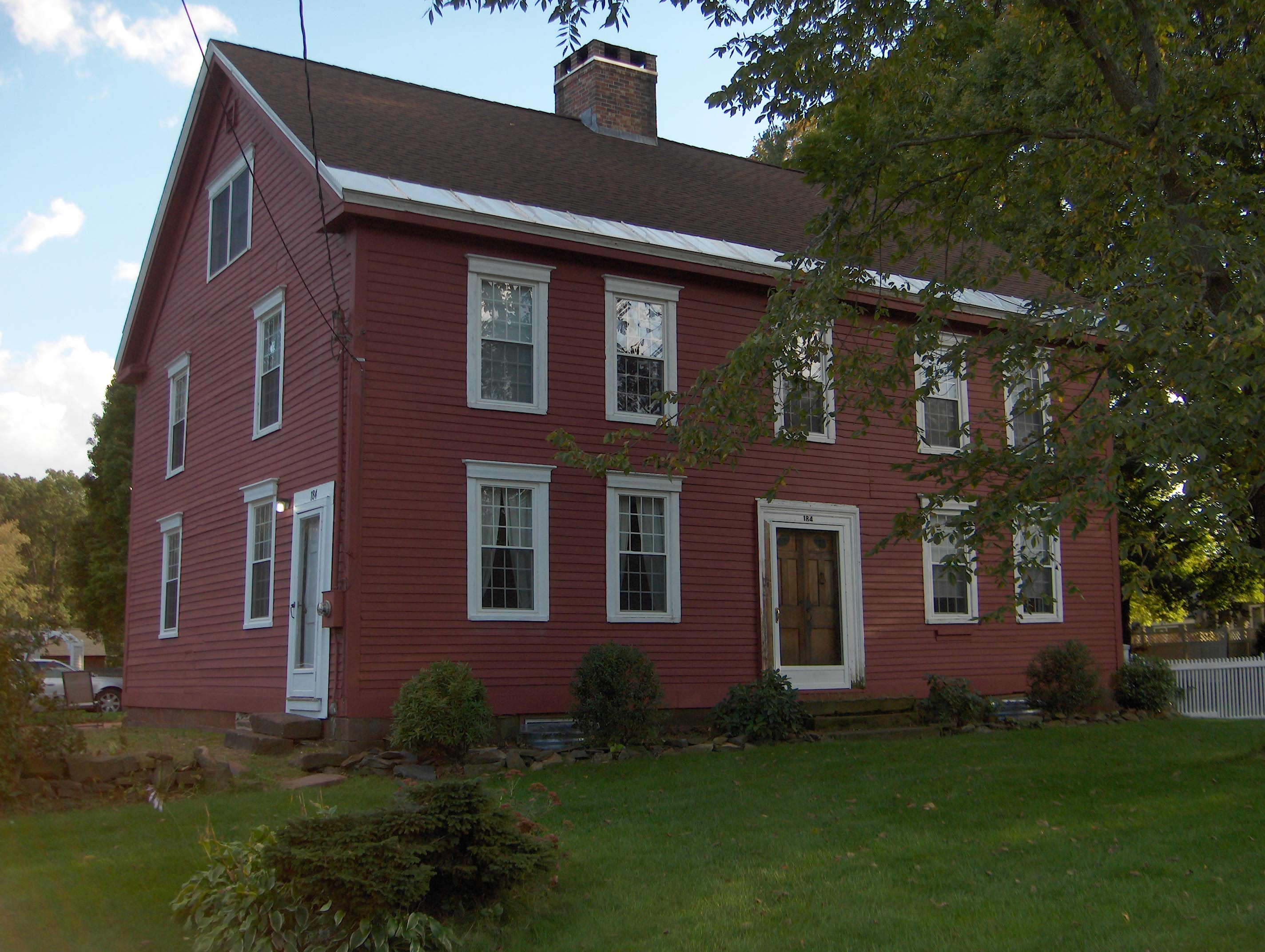

- Location within Connecticut Location within the United States
- Location: 184 Marion Avenue, Southington, Connecticut
- Coordinates: 41°35′5″N 72°54′12″W
- Area: 1.1 acres (0.45 ha)
- Built: 1750
- Architectural style: Colonial, New England Colonial
- MPS: Colonial Houses of Southington TR
- NRHP reference No.: 88003102
- Added to NRHP: January 19, 1989

The Josiah Cowles House is a historic house at 184 Marion Avenue, in the Plantsville section of Southington, Connecticut. Built in the mid-18th century, it is a well-preserved local example of Georgian architecture. It was listed on the National Register of Historic Places in 1989. It presently houses a bed and breakfast inn.

== Description and history ==
The Josiah Cowles House stands on the south side of Marion Avenue, between Sunny Ridge Drive and Old Mill Road west of the village center of Plantsville and Interstate 84. It is a 2 1/2-story wood-frame structure, five bays wide, with a side-gable roof, central chimney, and clapboarded exterior. Its main facade is five bays wide, with a wide double door at its center. The door is framed by simple trim, while the windows are surmounted by slightly projecting caps.

Although traditionally ascribed a construction date of 1728, the architecture suggests it was built closer to 1750, probably around the time of Josiah Cowles' second marriage. The house was the residence of Captain Josiah Cowles, one of the early settlers of Southington. Cowles was born in Farmington, Connecticut on November 20, 1713. He was a justice of the peace and a captain in the local militia. He held a number of town offices, and was viewed as a leading man in town. At the very first town meeting after the incorporation of Southington, held November 11, 1779, the residents appointed Cowles, along with Jonathan Root to a committee to "provide for the families of officers and soldiers in the field." In 1774, Cowles was appointed to a committee to deliver provisions to Boston, in response to the British blockade of Boston harbor.

== See also ==
- National Register of Historic Places listings in Southington, Connecticut
