= Marie Catharine Neal =

American botanist and author (1889–1965)

Marie Catherine Neal
- Born: December 7, 1889; Southington, Connecticut, U.S.
- Died: June 6, 1965 (aged 75); Honolulu, Hawaii, U.S.
- Education: Smith College
- Occupations: Botanist, author

Marie Catherine Neal (December 7, 1889 – June 6, 1965) was an American botanist and author known for her contributions to the study of Hawaiian flora and her efforts to popularize botanical knowledge.

== Biography ==
=== Early life and education ===
Marie Catherine Neal was born on December 7, 1889, in Southington, Connecticut, to Linus B. Neal, a banker, and Eva W. Chedney. Her interest in nature was sparked during childhood hunting and fishing excursions with her father, leading to a lifelong passion for botany.

Neal pursued her education at Smith College, graduating in 1912 with a B.A. degree. Her studies included a course in botany. During her college years, she gained administrative experience working as a secretary for various organizations. She received an MS degree from Yale University in 1925.

=== Career ===
Following her graduation, Neal began her career in botany as a secretary in the geology department at Yale under Herbert E. Gregory. In 1920, she moved to Honolulu, Hawaii, to continue her work for Gregory at the Bishop Museum. Initially placed in the conchology department, she collaborated on research projects, including cataloging terrestrial mollusks and coauthoring a monograph on land snails. Later on, Neal's botanical interests led her to focus on Hawaiian flora instead. During her tenure at the Bishop Museum from 1920 to 1930, Neal made notable contributions to the study of Hawaiian plants.

Neal's expertise in botany extended beyond academia. She contributed articles to the Paradise of the Pacific magazine, popularizing her knowledge of Hawaii's cultivated plants. In 1928, Neal coauthored her first major book, "In Honolulu Gardens," which provided scientific descriptions and illustrations of Hawaiian plants. The book received acclaim for its blend of botanical information with Hawaiian legends and folklore.

==== Contributions to botany ====
In 1930, Neal was appointed botanist at the Bishop Museum, where she expanded the herbarium collections and earned international recognition for her scholarship. She assisted scholars and the public in identifying Hawaiian plants and contributed to the museum's educational initiatives. Neal's botanical research extended to the outer islands of Hawaii, where she conducted extensive fieldwork, discovering new plant species and conducting research for her publications.

=== Later life and legacy ===
Marie Catherine Neal's significant work, In Gardens of Hawaii, published in 1948 and revised in 1965, described over 2,000 botanic species with detailed scientific information and illustrations. Neal's contributions to botany were recognized, and she received honors for her scientific achievements. She died on June 6, 1965.

== Bibliography ==
- Peterson, Barbara Bennett (February 2000). "Neal, Marie Catherine". American National Biography. New York: Oxford University Press. doi:10.1093/anb/9780198606697.article.2001406. (subscription required)
