= Tom Poitras =

American soccer coach (born 1968)

Biographical details
- Born: September 21, 1968 (age 58); Southington, Connecticut
- Education: Southern Connecticut

Playing career
- 1986–1989: Southern Connecticut
- 1992–1994: Connecticut Wolves

Coaching career (HC unless noted)
- 1994–1997: New Haven
- 1998–2003: Southern New Hampshire
- 2004–2010: UW-Green Bay
- 2011–2021: Hartford
- 2022–2025: Northern Kentucky

Head coaching record
- Overall: 250–173–71

Accomplishments and honors

Championships
- 2× Northeast 10 Tournament (2000, 2002); Horizon League Tournament (2009)

Awards
- New England Collegiate Conference Coach of the Year (1996); NSCAA New England Region Coach of the Year (2002); Connecticut Soccer Hall of Fame (2017)

Tom Poitras is an American soccer coach. He is formerly the head men's soccer coach at Northern Kentucky University, a position he held from 2022 to 2025.

== Playing career ==
Poitras played collegiate soccer at Southern Connecticut State University. During the 1987 season he was part of the division II national championship team.

== Coaching career ==
=== New Haven ===
From 1994 to 1997, he coached at the University of New Haven where he compiled a 38–32–5 record.

=== Southern New Hampshire ===
From 1998 to 2003, he served as the head men's soccer coach at Southern New Hampshire University where he posted an 81–25–16 record. His team advanced to four NCAA tournaments, and compiled five 10 win seasons.

=== UW Green Bay ===
His 2009 squad went 14–3–3, and reached the NCAA tournament for the first time in 26 years. During the season, UW-Green Bay had victories against Wisconsin, DePaul, and Butler. The team finished undefeated at home with a 7–0–1 record for the first time in 26 years, and a second place overall finish in the Horizon League. In 2007, his team beat NCAA runner-up Ohio State University in a major upset.

=== Hartford ===
He was hired as head coach at Hartford in April 2011. In 2014 Poitras signed a 5-year contract extension with Hartford. Poitras was inducted into the Connecticut Soccer Hall of Fame in 2017.

=== Northern Kentucky ===
He was hired as the 5th head coach in the history of Northern Kentucky's men's soccer program in January 2022.

He resigned following the 2025 season.

== Head coaching record ==
Record table
Season	Team	Overall	Conference	Standing	Postseason
New Haven Chargers (NECC) (1994–1997)
1994	New Haven	3–12–1	1–7		
1995	New Haven	7–9–2	2–5–2		
1996	New Haven	13–5–1	6–2–1		
1997	New Haven	15–6–1	3–4–1		
New Haven:		38–32–5	12–18–4		
Southern New Hampshire Penmen (NECC/Northeast-10 Conference) (1998–2003)
1998	Southern New Hampshire	16–3–2	7–2		
1999	Southern New Hampshire	12–4–2	6–1		
2000	Southern New Hampshire	13–4–5	8–2–3		
2001	Southern New Hampshire	13–4–1	10–3		
2002	Southern New Hampshire	20–3–2	11–1–1		NCAA Runner-Up
2003	Southern New Hampshire	7–7–4	5–6–2		
Southern New Hampshire:		81–25–16	47–15–9		
Green Bay Phoenix (Horizon League) (2004–2010)
2004	Green Bay	5–11–12	2–4–1	6th	
2005	Green Bay	9–10	3–4	6th	
2006	Green Bay	14–6	5–2	2nd	
2007	Green Bay	11–5–6	4–2	T-4th	
2008	Green Bay	6–7–5	4–2	4th	
2009	Green Bay	14–3–3	6–2	2nd	NCAA First Round
2010	Green Bay	13–4–2	6–2	2nd	
Green Bay:		72–46–18	30–18–5		
Hartford Hawks (America East Conference) (2011–2021)
2011	Hartford	8–9–4	3–2–2	5th	
2012	Hartford	7–9–1	1–5–1	8th	
2013	Hartford	13–4–4	4–2–1	3rd	
2014	Hartford	11–6–2	5–2–0	2nd	
2015	Hartford	5–7–5	1–4–2	8th	
2016	Hartford	9–10–3	2–3–2	6th	
2017	Hartford	5–10–3	1–5–1	8th	
2018	Hartford	1–10–5	1–5–1	8th	
2019	Hartford	12–5–4	4–2–1	3rd	
2020	Hartford	†	†	†	†
2021	Hartford	4–10–3	2–6–0	9th	
Hartford:		75–80–34 (.487)	24–36–11 (.415)		
Total:		266–188–78 (.573)			
National champion Postseason invitational champion Conference regular season champion Conference regular season and conference tournament champion Division regular season champion Division regular season and conference tournament champion Conference tournament champion

†NCAA canceled 2020 collegiate activities due to the COVID-19 virus.
