= Rogers Orchards =

American agricultural company

Rogers Orchards Incorporated
- Type: private company
- Industry: Agriculture
- Founded: 1807
- Founder: Chauncey Merriman
- Headquarters: Southington, Connecticut, U.S.
- Number of locations: 2
- Area served: New England
- Products: Farm Store Products
- Services: Wholesale and retail sales
- Revenue: $1,200,000 (Est. annual sales)
- Number of employees: 18 (Est.)
- Website: http://www.rogersorchards.com

Rogers Orchards, in Southington, Connecticut, is an agricultural-produce company owned and operated by members of the same family since its founding in 1807 and one of the leading agricultural producers in Connecticut.

Totaling 250 acres (1.0 km^{2}), it is Southington's largest farm and the largest apple-grower in the state, selling wholesale to local stores and retail at its farmers' markets.

It harvests and sells twenty varieties of apples annually, with McIntosh, Macoun, Cortland, and Empire among its most popular. Rogers Orchards also harvests and sells apricots, peaches, nectarines, plums, pumpkins, and other fruits and vegetables in season, and sells baked goods, honey and syrups, cut flowers, other farm-specialty products, and firewood.

== Company history ==
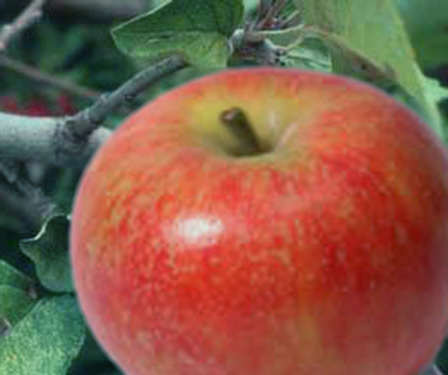
Baldwin apple

Founded by Chauncey Merriman in 1807, this family farm began operating in 1809, after Merriman's son, Anson, and four-year-old grandson, Josiah, began its apple orchards by planting one thousand Baldwin apple trees by hand. Once popular, now rare Baldwin apples, unlike other varieties, have been prized for the making of traditional New England cider.

Spanning "eight generations", the family farm, which came to be called Rogers Orchards, expanded to a 250-acre (1.0 km^{2}) operation split between two locations, the Home Farm and Sunnymount Farm, both located in Southington.

John Rogers, the president of Rogers Orchards and the great-great-great-great-grandson of Chauncey Merriman, runs the operation, which has an estimated 18 employees.

== Trade association memberships ==
Rogers Orchards is an active member of trade organizations of Connecticut fruit growers, including: the Connecticut Pomological Society; the Connecticut Apple Marketing Board; the New England Apple Association; and the New England Apple Council. Rogers Orchards President John Rogers is a member of the board of directors and secretary-treasurer of the New England Apple Association and a former president of the Connecticut Pomological Society.

== Site of Connecticut farm investment program launch ==
On July 25, 2008, Connecticut Governor M. Jodi Rell used Rogers Orchards as a setting to announce the launch of a $500,000 investment program designed to aid Connecticut's farmers. Rogers Orchards President John Rogers acknowledged in a newspaper interview that he did not know why the governor chose his farm as the setting for her visit and announcement, but that he was pleased by her presence and support of local independent farming operations.
