= Dale Zarrella =

American sculptor and painter

Dale Zarrella is a sculptor and painter living in Maui, Hawai'i. Born in Southington, Connecticut, he began sculpting at the age of nine and received his first commission, for a crucifix for St. Dominic Catholic Church, when he was 18. He relocated to Hawaii in 1985. He is best known for his statue of Saint Damien of Molokai, created for the Damien and Marianne of Moloka'i Heritage Center in Waikiki. A second copy of the statue was later presented to Pope Benedict XVI in commemoration of Father Damien's canonization.

Zarrella also serves as a director of the World Turtle Trust, a Hawaiian nonprofit that works to protect the endangered green sea turtle.

Examples of his work are on display at the King Kamehameha Golf Course Clubhouse, St. John's Seminary, the Grand Wailea Resort, and in the Vatican Museums, and have been collected by August Busch IV, Danny DeVito, Carl Weathers, and Fred L. Turner.
