= Mount Southington =

Ski area in Plantsville, Connecticut, US

Mount Southington Ski Area
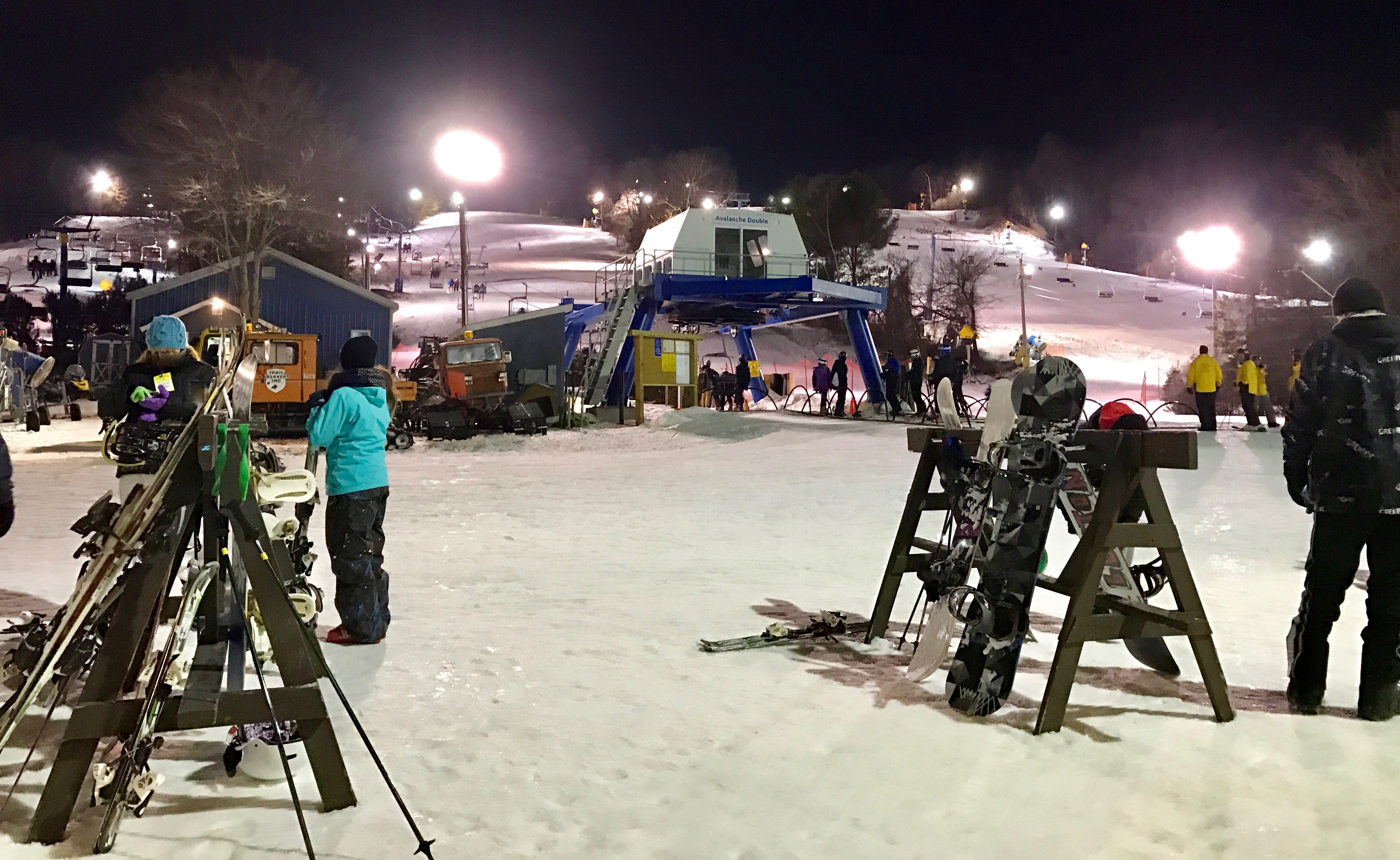
- Mount Southington's lifts Northstar, Stardust, Avalanche and Thunderbolt ski lifts and All trails lit at night
- Interactive map of Mount Southington Ski Area
- Location: Mount Southington, Plantsville, Connecticut
- Nearest city: Waterbury, Connecticut
- Coordinates: 41.58235°N 72.92587°W
- Status: Operating
- Vertical: 425 feet (130 m)
- Top elevation: 525 feet (160 m)
- Base elevation: 100 feet (30 m)
- Skiable area: 51 acres (0.21 km^{2})
- Trails: 14
- Longest run: .08 miles (0.13 km)
- Lift system: 7 lifts: 3 triple chairs,1 Double , 1 handle tow, 2 carpet lifts
- Terrain parks: 1
- Snowfall: 40 inches (100 cm)
- Snowmaking: 100%
- Night skiing: 100%
- Website: www.mountsouthington.com

Mount Southington Ski Area is located in Plantsville, Connecticut, United States, on Mount Vernon Road.

== Mountain information ==
The mountain has a skiing season from December to mid- March. However, in some years winter rainfall ends the season early. The runs are open 9am-9pm (Sat-Sun) and 10am-9pm (Mon-Fri).

There are fourteen trails: six Green Circle, four Blue Square, and two Black Diamond. Seven lifts serve the mountain: two double chairs (1-Summit, 1-Beginner Hill), two triple chairs (Summit), one rope tow (Children's Learning Area), and two Magic Carpets (Beginner Area and Children's Learning Area).

== History ==
Mount Southington was the site of a dairy farm until the 1960s when Dr. Harold Richman, the Palmisano family, and other investors purchased the farm and developed a ski area at the site after Richman was inspired by ski areas in Vermont. The mountain opened for skiing on December 10, 1964 and gradually expanded with more trails and lifts. Mount Southington formerly had a J-bar in the beginner area until 2001, when it was replaced by a double chair. The mountain also once had two T-bars on the Stardust Trail, which were removed back in the late 1980s or early 1990s.

The mountain's two remaining T-bars, lift #4 and lift #5, were removed after the conclusion of the 2008-2009 ski season. They are being replaced with a new Partek Triple Chairlift. The new chair runs on a similar path as the old T-bars, but slightly re-angled because the chairlift goes to the top of the mountain, unlike the previous mid-mountain T-bars.
