= Jonathan Root (photographer) =

Jonathan Root is an English portrait photographer.

His subjects include: David Hockney, Peter Blake, Allen Jones, Gilbert & George, Philippe Starck, Marc Newson, Richard Rogers, Norman Foster, Zaha Hadid, Alan Bennett, Mark Rylance, Lord Bath, and Nicholas Haslam.

His portraits of Gavin Turk, Craigie Aitchison, David Adjaye, John Winter, Lord Harewood and Lord March are part of The National Portrait Gallery Photographs Collection.

His exhibitions include:

“The John Kobal Photographic Portrait Awards” 1995, 1996 and 2000.

“The Edwardian Drape Society” (Tapestry Gallery) 2004.

“Lords and Ladies” (Tapestry Gallery) 2004.

“Sitting Pretty” (Rabih Hage Gallery) 2007.
