= Jonathan Root House =

Historic house in Connecticut, United States

- U.S. National Register of Historic Places
- U.S. Historic district – Contributing property
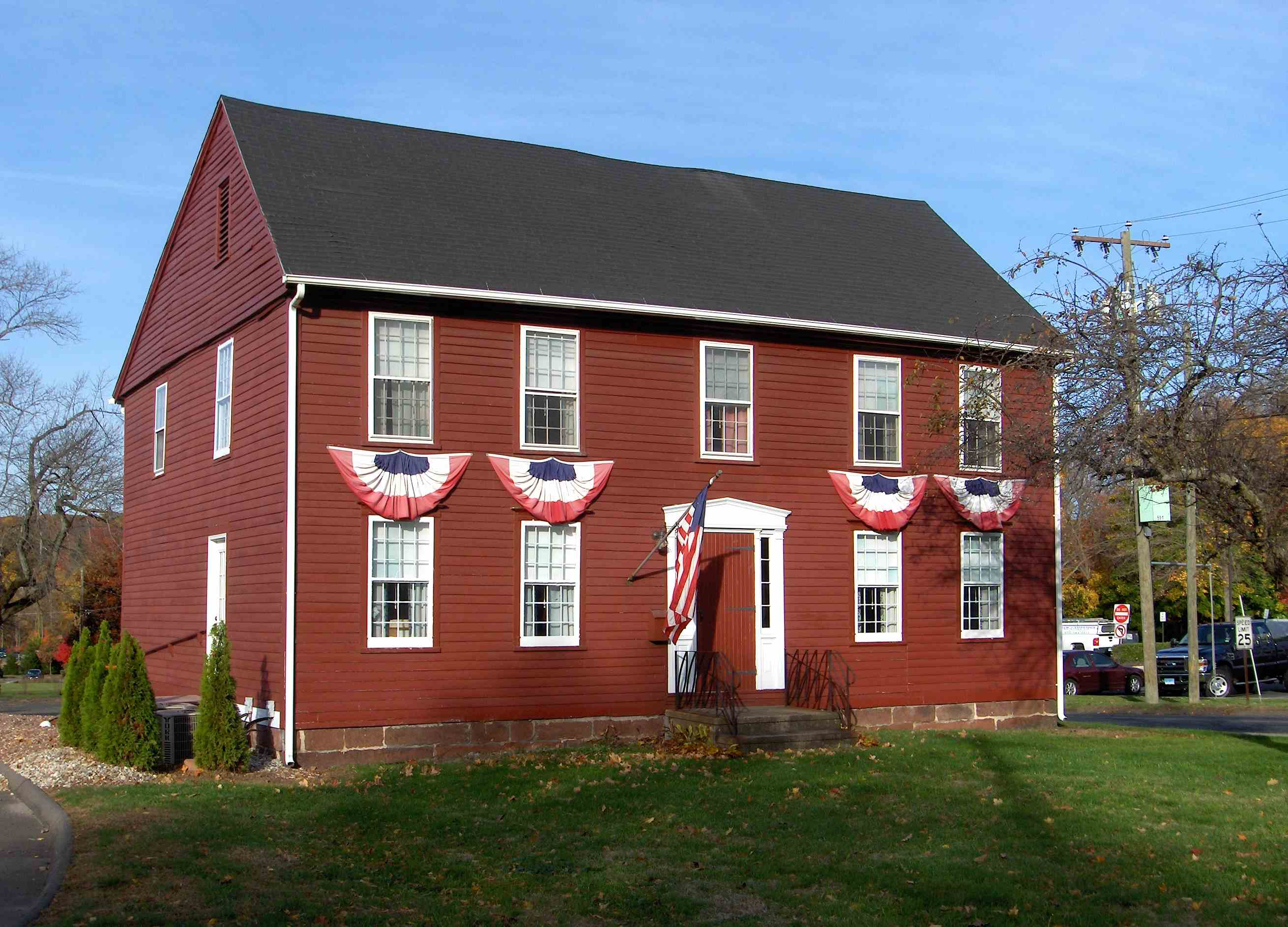

- Location within Connecticut Location within the United States
- Location: 140–142 North Main Street, Southington, Connecticut
- Coordinates: 41°36′16″N 72°52′43″W
- Area: 0.5 acres (0.20 ha)
- Built: c. 1720
- Architectural style: Colonial, New England Colonial
- Part of: Southington Center Historic District (ID88002961)
- MPS: Colonial Houses of Southington TR
- NRHP reference No.: 88003113

Significant dates
- Added to NRHP: January 19, 1989
- Designated CP: May 8, 1989

The Jonathan Root House is a historic house at 140–142 North Main Street in Southington, Connecticut. Built about 1720, it is believed to be the oldest surviving colonial building in the town. It was listed on the National Register of Historic Places in 1989, and now houses professional offices.

== Description and history ==
The Jonathan Root House is located north of the village center of Southington, on the west side of North Main Street at its junction with Mill Street. It is a 2 1/2-story wood-frame structure, five bays wide, with a large central chimney and a center entrance. The entrance is flanked by sidelight windows and topped by a gabled entablature. It originally had a more steeply sloping rear roof, giving it a saltbox profile, but that was raised in the 20th century to provide for a larger second story. Well-preserved interior elements include a period builtin cupboard.

The house's exact construction date is not known, but it was the residence of Jonathan Root, a prominent 18th-century resident, and is estimated to have been built around 1720. The town was first settled in the late 17th century, and Root (born 1707) married into the locally prominent Woodruff family. When Southington was incorporated in 1779, the residents chose Root as one of the five first selectmen. At that same meeting, Root, along with Josiah Cowles, were appointed to a committee to "provide for the families of officers and soldiers in the field." In 1774, Root was appointed to a committee to deliver provisions to Boston, in response to the British blockade of Boston harbor. In addition to living here, Root also operated a tavern on the premises.

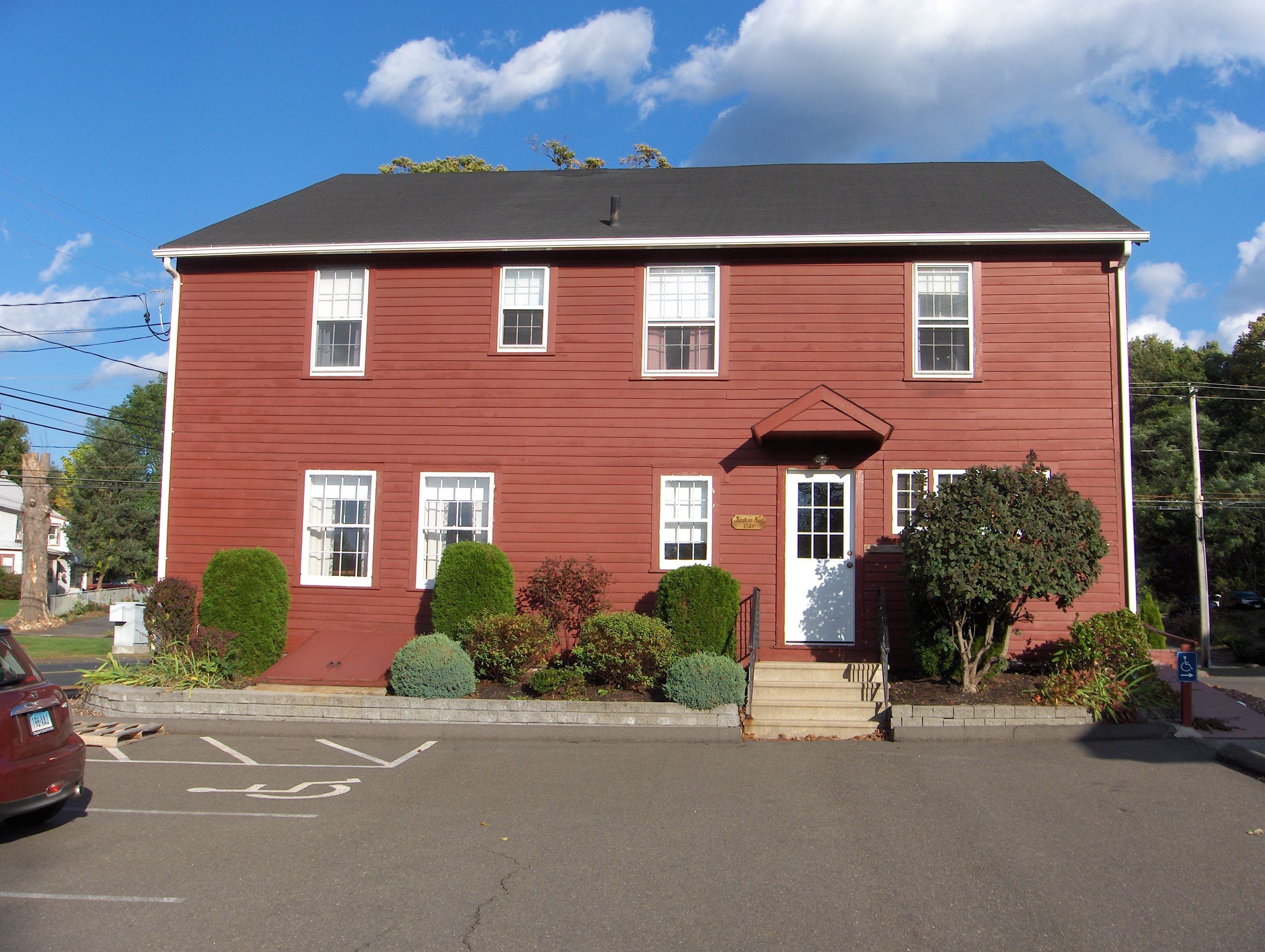
Jonathan Root House from rear of building

== See also ==
- National Register of Historic Places listings in Southington, Connecticut
