= Carriage bolt =

Type of bolt

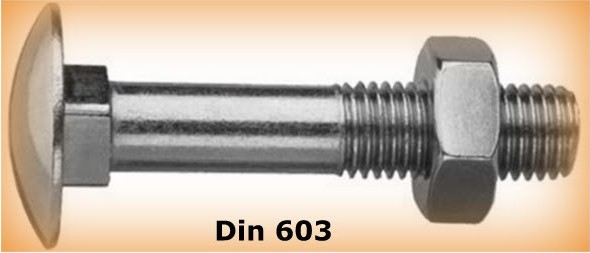
Carriage bolt according DIN 603

A carriage bolt (also called coach bolt and round-head square-neck bolt) is a type of bolt. It is also known as a cup head bolt in Australia and New Zealand.

It is distinguished from other bolts by its shallow mushroom head and the fact that the cross-section of the shank, though circular for most of its length (as in other kinds of bolt), is square immediately beneath the head. This makes the bolt self-locking when it is placed through a square hole in a metal strap. This allows the fastener to be installed with only one wrench, working from the opposite end. The head of a carriage bolt is usually a shallow dome. The shank has no threads and its diameter equals the size of the square cross-section.

The carriage bolt was devised for use through an iron strengthening plate on either side of a wooden beam, the squared part of the bolt fitting into a square hole in the ironwork. It is also not uncommon to use a carriage bolt on bare timber, the square section being allowed to sink into the soft wood fibers when tightened, giving enough grip to prevent rotation. The principle is the same as in purpose-built timber bolts.

The carriage bolt is used extensively in security applications, such as locks and hinges, where the bolt must be removable from one side only. The smooth, domed head and square nut below prevent the carriage bolt from being gripped and rotated from the insecure side.

== Timber bolt ==
Closely related to the carriage bolt is the timber bolt (also called mushroom-head bolt and dome-head bolt), meant to fasten wood to wood (rather than metal to wood), for use with large wood planks and structures. It has a domed head that is proportionally wider than that of a carriage bolt. Instead of the carriage bolt's square part of the shank immediately under the head, the timber bolt has four fillets, whose sharp corners grip the edge of the hole in the wood to prevent rotation.

== Plow bolt ==
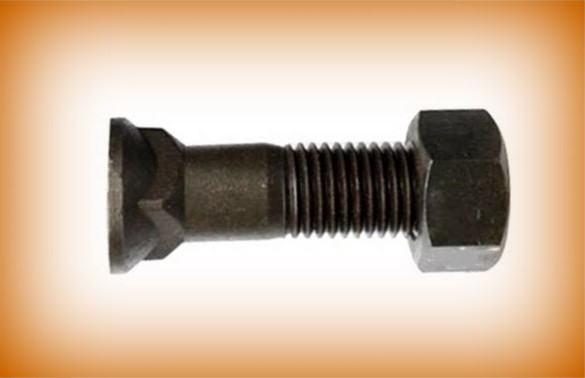
Plow bolt

The plow bolt or plough bolt is a flush-fitting carriage bolt, whose head is countersunk beneath the surface of the material. The plow bolt was devised to hold replaceable plowshares to the moldboards of iron plows. The share, the fastest-wearing part of the plow, would be replaced several times over the life of the plow. Such bolts continue to be used anywhere a protruding head is undesirable, such as to hold shovels onto cultivators, and cutting edges onto earthmoving implements.

== See also ==
- Coach screw or lag bolt, a square- or hex-headed screw with a tapered woodscrew thread.
