= Connecticut Route 322 =

State highway in central Connecticut, US

Route 322
- Map of central Connecticut with Route 322 highlighted in red

Route information
- Maintained by CTDOT
- Length: 9.80 mi (15.77 km)
- Existed: 1963–present

Major junctions
- West end: Route 69 in Wolcott
- I-84 in Southington
- East end: I-691 in Southington

Location
- Country: United States
- State: Connecticut
- Counties: New Haven, Hartford

Highway system
- Connecticut State Highway System; Interstate; US; State; SSR; SR; Scenic
← Route 320	→ Route 334

Route 322 is a state highway in west central Connecticut, running from Wolcott to Southington.

== Route description ==
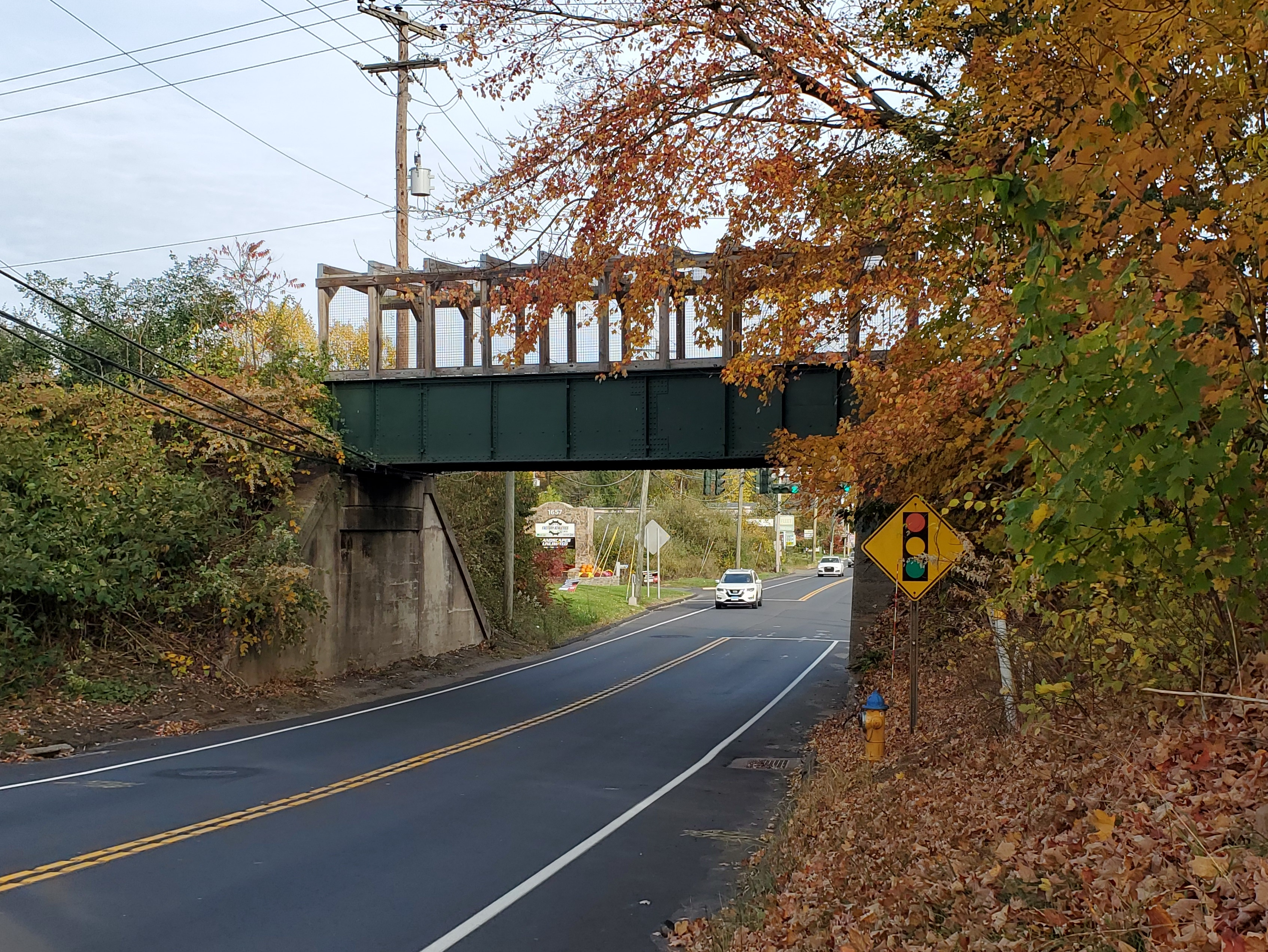
Route 322 passing under the Farmington Canal Trail in Milldale

Route 322 begins at an intersection with Route 69 in Wolcott and passes through the Town Center as it curves East, Southeast, and South to the Southeast Corner of the Town. It then turns onto Meriden Road, and descends into Southington, becoming Meriden-Waterbury Turnpike. In Southington, it continues in a generally east-southeasterly direction just north of the Southington-Cheshire Town line. It intersects I-84 at exit 40B, and then meets Route 10 at a grade separated intersection. It briefly crosses into Cheshire before crossing the Quinnipiac River and reentering Southeastern Southington. It meets the Southern End of Route 120 before ending at an interchange with I-691 near the Southington-Meriden Town line. The road continues into Meriden as West Main Street.

== History ==
Route 322 was established in 1963, running from Route 69 to then US 6A (Meriden Road) in Wolcott. The year before becoming a signed route, Route 322 was taken over by the state and designated as unsigned SR 522 as part of the Route Reclassification Act. In 1967, with the decommissioning of US 6A, it was extended east along former US 6A to I-84 in Southington. In 1987, with the opening of I-691, the portion from I-84 to exit 4 of I-691 was transferred from Route 66 (which was truncated to I-91) to Route 322.

== Junction list ==
County	Location	mi	km	Destinations	Notes
New Haven	Wolcott	0.00	0.00	Route 69 – Waterbury, Bristol	Western terminus
New Haven	Wolcott	4.31	6.94	Meriden Road (SR 844 west) – Waterbury	Former US 6A
Hartford	Southington	6.14	9.88	I-84 – Waterbury, Hartford	Exit 40B on I-84
Hartford	Southington	6.82	10.98	Clark Street (SR 509 north)	
Hartford	Southington	7.34	11.81	Route 10 – Cheshire, New Haven, Plantsville	Interchange
Hartford	Southington	9.35	15.05	Route 120	
Hartford	Southington	9.80	15.77	I-691 – Waterbury, Meriden	Eastern terminus; exit 5 on I-691; former Route 66
1.000 mi = 1.609 km; 1.000 km = 0.621 mi
