= Connecticut Route 120 =

State highway in Connecticut, United States

Route 120
- Meriden Avenue
- Map of Hartford County in northern Connecticut with Route 120 highlighted in red

Route information
- Maintained by CTDOT
- Length: 3.11 mi (5.01 km)
- Existed: 1932–present

Major junctions
- South end: Route 322 in Southington
- North end: Route 10 in Southington

Location
- Country: United States
- State: Connecticut
- Counties: Hartford

Highway system
- Connecticut State Highway System; Interstate; US; State; SSR; SR; Scenic
← Route 118	→ Route 121

Route 120 is a state highway in Connecticut, running entirely in the town of Southington. It serves as a more direct connection between the town center of Southington and the city of Meriden.

== Route description ==
Route 120 begins at an intersection with Route 322 in southeastern Southington, just west of the Meriden city line and about 0.3 miles (0.48 km) from an interchange with I-691. It heads in a northwest direction, crossing Misery Brook about 1.5 miles (2.4 km) later, passing by the St. Thomas Cemetery, then intersecting with Route 364 after another 1.5 miles (2.4 km). Route 120 ends at an intersection with Route 10 in the center of town after another 0.2 miles (0.32 km). The entire length of Route 120 is two lanes wide and is known as Meriden Avenue. Route 120 is classified as an urban major collector road and carries an average daily traffic volume of 8,900.

== History ==
In the 1920s, the direct Southington-Meriden route was designated as a secondary state highway known as Highway 326. The old highway was renumbered to Route 120 as part of the 1932 state highway renumbering. The route has remained mostly unchanged since then.

== Junction list ==
The entire route is in Southington, Hartford County.

mi	km	Destinations	Notes
0.00	0.00	Route 322 – Meriden, Milldale	Southern terminus
2.94	4.73	Route 364 east – Berlin	Western terminus of Route 364
3.11	5.01	Route 10 – Plainville, Plantsville	Northern terminus
1.000 mi = 1.609 km; 1.000 km = 0.621 mi
