= Connecticut Route 10 =

State highway in Connecticut, US

Route 10
- Map of Connecticut with Route 10 highlighted in red

Route information
- Maintained by CTDOT
- Length: 54.28 mi (87.36 km)
- Existed: 1922–present

Major junctions
- South end: I-95 in New Haven
- US 1 in New Haven; I-691 in Cheshire; I-84 in Southington; US 6 in Farmington; US 44 / US 202 in Avon
- North end: US 202 / Route 10 at the Massachusetts state line in Granby

Location
- Country: United States
- State: Connecticut
- Counties: New Haven, Hartford

Highway system
- Connecticut State Highway System; Interstate; US; State; SSR; SR; Scenic
← Route 9A	→ Route 11
← Route 9	N.E.	→ Route 11

Connecticut Route 10 is a state highway that runs from Interstate 95 (I-95) in New Haven to the Massachusetts state line, where it continues as Massachusetts Route 10, which in turn continues directly to New Hampshire Route 10.

Route 10 was originally commissioned in 1922 as New England Route 10, connecting Old Saybrook to Granby. In the 1927, the New England system of route numbers was disbanded, and the route was added to the state route system. In the 1930s, it was realigned to connect New Haven and Granby through Connecticut. It is co-signed with US 202 starting in Avon and continuing north to the state line.

== Route description ==
Route 10 begins at a diamond interchange with Interstate 95 (I-95) as Ella T. Grasso Boulevard in The Hill neighborhood in the city of New Haven, New Haven County. Ella T. Grasso Boulevard continues west as a four-lane undivided, municipally-maintained street to a T junction with Kimberly Avenue, just west of the I-95 interchange and east of the West River.

Route 10 then heads northwest through mixed areas of development, parallel to the river on the east. The route crosses over Metro-North Railroad's New Haven Line, which also carries Amtrak trains on the Northeast Corridor, before reaching a four-way intersection with U.S. Route 1 to the southwest of Evergreen Cemetery.

Past US 1, Route 10 enters the West River neighborhood, where it intersects Route 34, which connects westwards with the Yale Bowl and eventually Derby. The route turns northeast, narrows to two lanes and comes into the residential Edgewood Park Historic District after crossing Chapel Street. A short distance later, Route 10 turns left (northwest) again on Whalley Avenue, which is city-maintained, to the east towards the Yale University campus, while Ella. T Grasso Boulevard (still municipally maintained) continues northeast into the Beaver Hills neighborhood. The route widens to four lanes until it reaches its intersection with the southern terminus of Route 63. Route 63 continues northwest and takes the Whalley Avenue name, while Route 10 turns northeast onto the undivided, two-lane Fitch Street. On Fitch Street, the route passes through more residential areas and the campus of Southern Connecticut State University, where it briefly divides into four lanes.

After leaving the university, Route 10 enters the town of Hamden before turning right (east) onto Arch Street, which continues west as a town-maintained street to Pine Rock Avenue. Shortly afterward, the route turns left and north-northeast onto Dixwell Avenue, which continues south back towards New Haven. Route 10 becomes a four-lane undivided road through a mix of residential and commercial areas, running to the west of Lake Whitney, before it crosses the Mill River and reaches another interchange with Route 15, the Wilbur Cross Parkway. From the Parkway, the route parallels the river to the west, passes between several shopping centers, prior to briefly gaining a median to accommodate a gas station and passing under the right-of-way of the Farmington Canal, then reaching its four-way intersection with Whitney Avenue. Here, Route 10 turns north onto Whitney Avenue, which continues south towards New Haven, while Dixwell Avenue continues east to US 5 in the town of North Haven. The route passes through the center of Hamden, prior to intersecting the western end of the Route 40 freeway, which provides access to I-91; a flyover ramp exists from southbound Route 10 to eastbound Route 40. Past Route 40, Route 10 immediately intersects the western terminus of Route 22, which heads east towards North Haven, prior to passing near the campuses of Quinnipiac University and Sleeping Giant State Park in the Mount Carmel neighborhood. At this point, Route 10 reduces to two lanes and begins to parallel the Farmington Canal to the east, before it leaves Hamden and becomes South Main Street of the town of Cheshire.

In Cheshire, the route passes residential areas, before reaching commercial areas near the center of town, intersecting the east end of Route 42, as well as passing east of Cheshire High School. At the center of Cheshire, Route 10 has a brief concurrency with Route 68/Route 70 to the west of the Cheshire Academy; Route 68 heads east towards the town of Wallingford and west towards the town of Prospect, while Route 70 leads east towards the city of Meriden and west towards the city of Waterbury, the latter via a connection with I-84. Past the triplex, the route's name changes to Highland Avenue and passes to the east of the Cheshire Correctional Institution, before it reaches an interchange with the I-691 freeway, which provides access to I-91 eastbound in Meriden, and I-84 westbound. Shorty past I-691, Route 10 passes to the west of a park-and-ride lot, prior to coming to an oblique junction with Route 322, with a bridge over that highway; access from northbound Route 10 to eastbound Route 322 and from westbound Route 322 to southbound Route 10 is via Old Turnpike Road. At this junction, the route comes into both the town of Southington and Hartford County as Cheshire Road, and shortly afterward becomes Norton Street in the Milldale neighborhood. Route 10 crosses the Quinnipiac River, and passes east of another park and ride lot, to the south of its intersection with connector ramps to and from the eastbound direction of the I-84 freeway, before becoming the southern leg of North Main Street of Southington.

The route heads into the center of the neighborhood of Plantsville, where it insects the western leg of North Main Street that provides full access to I-84, and it also turns northeast onto the mainline North Main Street. Route 10 turns north again at its northern intersection with Old Turnpike Road, before intersecting the northern terminus of Route 120, which provides access to Route 364 in Southington Center. The route also passes through the Southington Campus of the Branford Hall Career Institute, prior to becoming Queen Street at the Flanders Street intersection. From here, Route 10 heads through a commercial zone, expands to four lanes, and comes to a partial cloverleaf interchange with I-84, before it narrows back to two lanes after its intersection with West Queen Street. The route enters the town of Plainville as it intersects the southern terminus of Route 177, where its name also changes to East Street. In Plainville, Route 10 heads through a mix of residential and commercial areas, before it crosses the Highland Division of the former New York, New Haven, and Hartford Railroad at a grade crossing, and shortly afterward, Route 372 at an oblique intersection; eastbound Route 372 provides access to both the I-84 and the eastbound direction of the Route 72 freeway. Past Route 372, the route passes under Route 72 without an interchange, and continues through a residential neighborhood as Farmington Avenue. Route 10 heads back into areas of businesses as it leaves Plainville and becomes the Main Street of the town of Farmington. The route comes into wooded areas, prior to reaching another oblique, grade-separated junction with US 6, in which Scott Swamp Road provides the access not provided by the ramp from northbound Route 10 to eastbound US 6.

From US 6, Route 10 continues into the areas of historic Farmington Center, before intersecting and crossing Route 4, providing access to I-84 eastbound and the town of Unionville westbound. In 1999, a 1.11-mile (1.79 km) section of Route 10 in Farmington Center between Tunxis Road and Route 4 was designated as a scenic road by the state of Connecticut. After the Route 4 intersection, the route begins to parallel the Farmington River on the west and its name changes to Waterville Road, as it passes through a country club and more wooded areas of residences. Around its intersection with Talcott Notch Road, Route 10 enters the town of Avon, continuing through large-lotted residential zones, before meeting its southern/eastern junction with US 44 in the village of Alsop Corner; US 44 continues eastbound towards the town of West Hartford. The northbound state route joins a duplexed concurrency with westbound US 44, along the Main Street of Avon that crosses the Farmington River, before reaching the northern/western junction with US 44 and the southern junction with US 202 in Avon Center; US 44/US 202 continues west along their own duplexed-concurrency toward the towns of Canton, where westbound US 202 splits, and Winsted. Meanwhile, northbound Route 10 turns north again and forms another duplexed concurrency with northbound US 202 along the Avon Veterans Memorial Highway, and heads through mix of residences and business parks, before becoming Hopmeadow Street upon coming into the town of Simsbury. In the village of Weatogue, the routes meets the west end of Route 185, which heads east towards the town of Bloomfield, and east of Simsbury Center, intersects the northern end of Route 167 that provides access to Route 309.

US 202/Route 10 continues through the historic residential and commercial areas of the center of Simsbury, before intersecting the western terminus of Route 315, which leads northeast toward the village of Tariffville. The two routes head into wooded residential zones and enter the town of Granby as Veteran's Highway, before becoming Salmon Brook Street. In the center of Granby, US 202/Route 10 are briefly triplexed with northbound Route 189, up to the Route 20 intersection, where northbound Route 189 becomes duplexed with westbound Route 20, and heads northwest towards the village of North Granby. The routes continue through more areas of forests and residences, with some businesses around, until Connecticut Route 10 ends at the Massachusetts state line and US 202 continues north, into the town of Southwick, Hampden County. A continuation of Connecticut Route 10, Massachusetts Route 10, begins at the state line duplexed with US 202, and crosses Massachusetts, which in turn continues into New Hampshire as New Hampshire Route 10, as part of the legacy of 1922-designated multi-state New England Route 10.

The Southington section of Route 10 was dedicated on Aug. 6, 1960 (and rededicated on Oct. 6, 2007) as the Louis G. Tolles Memorial Highway in honor of the late Southington native and leader of the Connecticut State Grange (1885–1956).

== History ==
Route 10 originally followed a different route south of Granby, Connecticut, starting in the town of Old Saybrook instead of at its current New Haven terminus. It moved to its current alignment along the Connecticut section of the College Highway in 1932, with the former alignment becoming the original Route 9. The original routing is now Routes 154, 99, and 189. During the 1960s Connecticut planned on building an expressway along the Route 10 corridor, but the only part of this plan actually constructed was Route 40 in the Mount Carmel area of Hamden, as well as several exit ramps connecting Route 10 to I-84 southwest of Hartford.

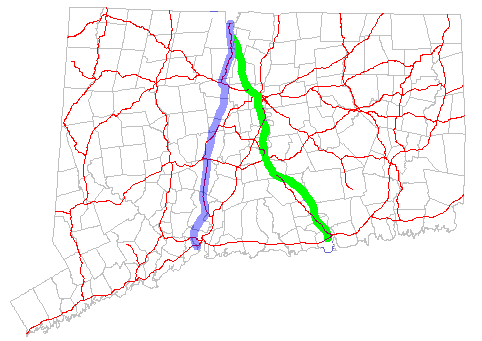
Map of Connecticut showing the original 1920s route in green and the modern route in blue

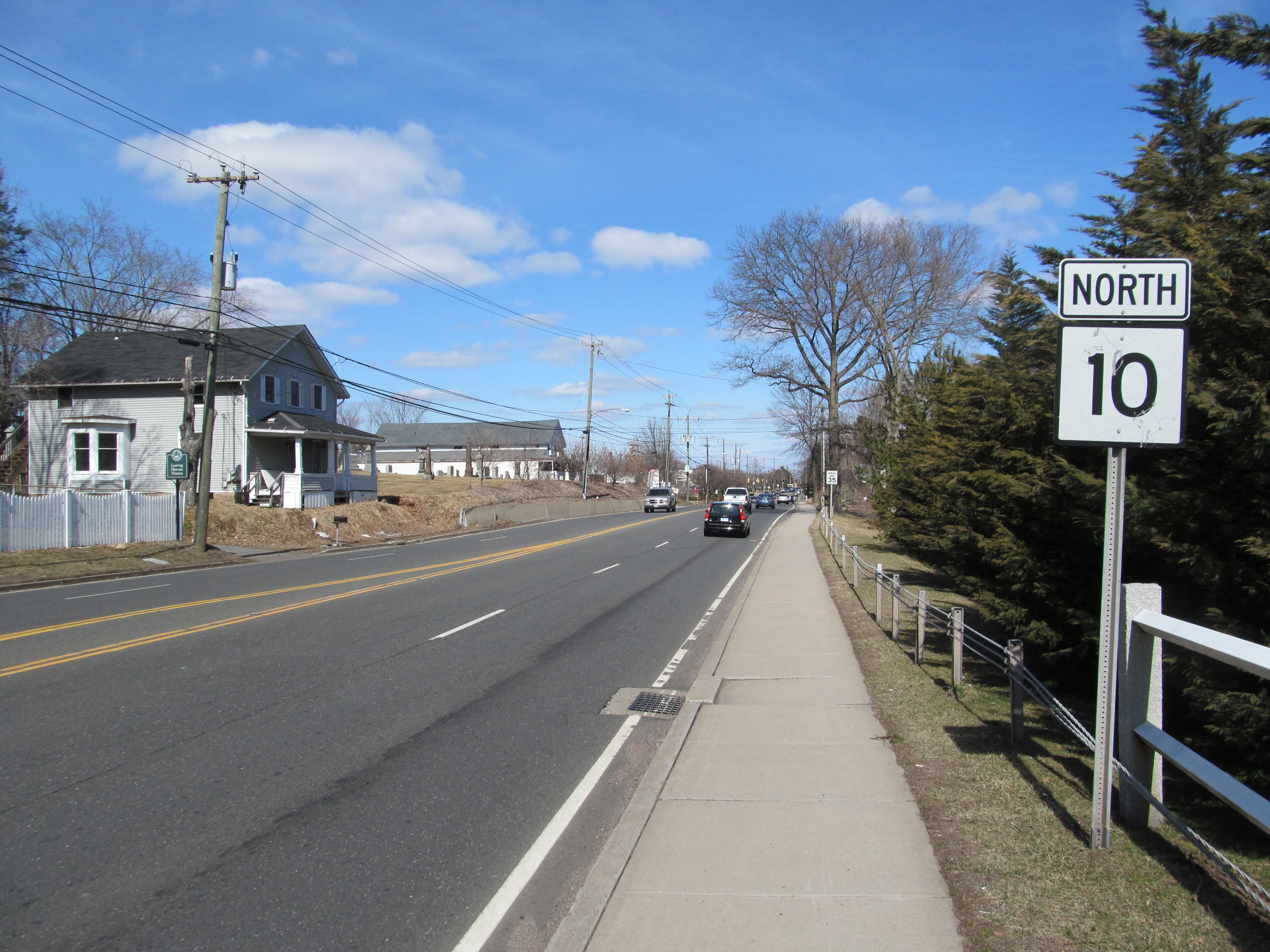
Route 10 Northbound in Cheshire

== Junction list ==
County	Location	mi	km	Destinations	Notes
New Haven	New Haven	0.00	0.00	I-95 / Kimberly Avenue (SR 745) – New London, New York City	Southern terminus; exit 46A on I-95
New Haven	New Haven	0.27	0.43	Kimberly Avenue (SR 745 south)	
New Haven	New Haven	1.29	2.08	US 1 (Boston Post Road / Columbus Avenue)	
New Haven	New Haven	1.88	3.03	Legion Avenue – Downtown New Haven	Former Route 34
New Haven	New Haven	2.20	3.54	Route 34 west (Derby Avenue) – Derby	Eastern terminus of Route 34
New Haven	New Haven	3.42	5.50	Route 63 north (Whalley Avenue)	Southern terminus of Route 63
New Haven	Hamden	7.03	11.31	Route 15 (Wilbur Cross Parkway) – Hartford, New Haven	Exit 50 on Wilbur Cross Parkway
New Haven	Hamden	8.59	13.82	Whitney Avenue (SR 707 south) / Dixwell Avenue (SR 717 east) to I-91	
New Haven	Hamden	10.05	16.17	Route 40 south to I-91 – Hartford, New Haven	Northern terminus of Route 40
New Haven	Hamden	10.27	16.53	Route 22 east – North Haven	Western terminus of Route 22
New Haven	Cheshire	15.77	25.38	Route 42 west (North Brooksvale Road)	Eastern terminus of Route 42
New Haven	Cheshire	16.94	27.26	Route 68 east / Route 70 east – Meriden, Wallingford	Southern end of Route 68/Route 70 concurrency
New Haven	Cheshire	17.09	27.50	Route 68 west / Route 70 west – Prospect, Waterbury	Northern end of Route 68/Route 70 concurrency
New Haven	Cheshire	20.99	33.78	I-691 – Meriden, Waterbury	Exit 7 on I-691
Hartford	Southington	21.55	34.68	Route 322 – Marion, Wolcott	Interchange
Hartford	Southington	22.05	35.49	Clark Street (SR 509 south)	
Hartford	Southington	22.25	35.81	To I-84 east – Hartford	Access via SR 597
Hartford	Southington	23.25	37.42	To I-84 – Hartford, Waterbury	Access via West Main Street
Hartford	Southington	24.28	39.07	Route 120 south (Meriden Avenue) to Route 364 east	Northern terminus of Route 120
Hartford	Southington	26.75	43.05	I-84 – Hartford, Waterbury	Exit 46 on I-84
Hartford	Plainville	28.09	45.21	Route 177 north (Town Line Road)	Southern terminus of Route 177
Hartford	Plainville	29.82	47.99	Route 372 to I-84 / Route 72 east – New Britain, Plainville Business District	
Hartford	Farmington	32.01	51.52	To US 6 – Bristol, Plymouth, Hartford	Access via SR 552
Hartford	Farmington			US 6 east – Hartford	Interchange; northbound exit only
Hartford	Farmington	33.85	54.48	Route 4 to I-84 (US 6 east) – West Hartford, Hartford, Unionville	
Hartford	Avon	39.42	63.44	US 44 east – West Hartford, Hartford	Southern end of US 44 concurrency
Hartford	Avon	40.16	64.63	US 44 west / US 202 west – Canton, Winsted	Northern end of US 44 concurrency; southern end of US 202 concurrency
Hartford	Simsbury	42.99	69.19	Route 185 east – Bloomfield	Western terminus of Route 185
Hartford	Simsbury	44.75	72.02	Route 167 south to Route 309 west – West Simsbury	Northern terminus of Route 167
Hartford	Simsbury	46.81	75.33	Route 315 east – Tariffville	Western terminus of Route 315
Hartford	Granby	50.84	81.82	Route 189 south – Bloomfield	Southern end of Route 189 concurrency
Hartford	Granby	50.92	81.95	Route 20 / Route 189 north – North Granby, East Granby	Northern end of Route 189 concurrency
Hartford	Granby	54.28	87.36	US 202 north / Route 10 north – Westfield, Holyoke, Northampton	Continuation into Massachusetts; northern end of US 202 concurrency
1.000 mi = 1.609 km; 1.000 km = 0.621 mi: Concurrency terminus; Incomplete access

== See also ==
- New England Interstate Route 10
