= Connecticut Route 69 =

North-south state highway in Connecticut, US

Route 69
- Map of central Connecticut with Route 69 highlighted in red

Route information
- Maintained by CTDOT
- Length: 35.16 mi (56.58 km)
- Existed: 1932–present

Major junctions
- South end: Route 63 in New Haven
- Route 15 / Wilbur Cross Parkway in New Haven; Route 42 in Bethany; Route 68 in Prospect; I-84 in Waterbury; Route 322 in Wolcott; Route 72 in Bristol
- North end: Route 4 in Burlington

Location
- Country: United States
- State: Connecticut
- Counties: New Haven, Hartford

Highway system
- Connecticut State Highway System; Interstate; US; State; SSR; SR; Scenic
← Route 68	→ Route 70

Route 69 is a primary north–south state highway in the U.S. state of Connecticut connecting the city of New Haven to the city of Bristol in the western part of Greater Hartford, passing through Greater Waterbury along the way. The route extends north of Bristol as a secondary route into the town of Burlington. Route 69 is 35.16 miles (56.58 km) in total length.

== Route description ==
Route 69 begins in the Amity neighborhood of New Haven as the continuation of Whalley Avenue, splitting off from Route 63, which continues along Amity Road. It soon crosses underneath Route 15 (Wilbur Cross Parkway) with an interchange at the Woodbridge town line. Past the Parkway, the road becomes known as Litchfield Turnpike and heads northward along the western side of West Rock. Route 69 then enters the town of Bethany, where the route leaves the Litchfield Turnpike to head along Carrington Road. Several miles later, Route 69 enters the town of Prospect with the road becoming known as New Haven Road. North of Prospect center, the road becomes Waterbury Road as it heads towards the city of Waterbury. In Waterbury, the road becomes Prospect Road and then later Hamilton Avenue, before meeting with I-84, then turning right onto Silver Street Expressway, later becoming Meriden Road. Route 69 leaves Meriden Road following Woodtick Road and Stillson Road, then turns right onto Wolcott Street.

Wolcott Street becomes Wolcott Road as Route 69 crosses from Waterbury into the town of Wolcott. Route 69 intersects with Route 322 in the town center then continues north towards the city of Bristol. In central Bristol, the route turns onto West Street, intersecting with Route 72 and U.S. Route 6. After a brief 0.4-mile (0.64 km) overlap with Route 6, Route 69 continues its northward journey along Burlington Avenue. After the junction with Route 6, the road becomes a secondary, minor arterial road as it heads into the town of Burlington. In Burlington, the road name changes to Milford Street and eventually ends at a junction with Route 4 near the town center of Burlington.

== History ==
Parts of modern Route 69 belonged to two separate state highways in the 1920s. The road from Prospect to Waterbury was designated as State Highway 348, while the road from Waterbury to Bristol was known as State Highway 172. Route 69 was created in the 1932 state highway renumbering as a direct route from New Haven to Waterbury. It used the southernmost portion of the old Litchfield Turnpike (local name for the Straits Turnpike) from the Amity section of New Haven to Bethany, then former town roads from Bethany to Prospect (Carrington Road and New Haven Road), and then former State Highway 348 from Prospect to East Main Street (then Route 14) in Waterbury. The section from Waterbury to Bristol (former State Highway 172) was renumbered to Route 119 in 1932. In 1934, Route 69 was extended to Bristol (at Route 6), taking over former Route 119. In 1962, a further extension north to Burlington (at Route 4) using former unsigned SR 787 was made. At the same time, the route in Waterbury was shifted slightly east (from Wolcott Street to Woodtick Road) for better through traffic flow.

== Junction list ==
County	Location	mi	km	Destinations	Notes
New Haven	New Haven	0.00	0.00	Route 63 – Downtown New Haven, Woodbridge	Southern terminus
New Haven	New Haven	0.32	0.51	Route 15 (Wilbur Cross Parkway) – Hartford, New York City	Exit 46 on Wilbur Cross Parkway
New Haven	Woodbridge	0.48	0.77	Lucy Street (SR 749 west)	
New Haven	Bethany	8.95	14.40	Route 42 – Beacon Falls, Cheshire	
New Haven	Prospect	12.04	19.38	Route 68 – Union City, Cheshire	
New Haven	Waterbury	15.77	25.38	I-84 east – Hartford	Exit 33B on I-84
New Haven	Waterbury			To I-84 west – Danbury	Access via Union Street
New Haven	Wolcott	21.31	34.30	Route 322 east – Wolcott Center	Western terminus of Route 322
Hartford	Bristol	27.12	43.65	Route 72 – Terryville, Plainville	
Hartford	Bristol	27.82	44.77	US 6 west – Terryville, Plymouth, Thomaston	Southern end of US 6 concurrency
Hartford	Bristol	28.21	45.40	US 6 east – Farmington, Hartford	Northern end of US 6 concurrency
Hartford	Burlington	35.16	56.58	Route 4 – Harwinton, Unionville	Northern terminus
1.000 mi = 1.609 km; 1.000 km = 0.621 mi
