= Pines Bridge Historic District =

Historic district in Connecticut, United States

- U.S. National Register of Historic Places
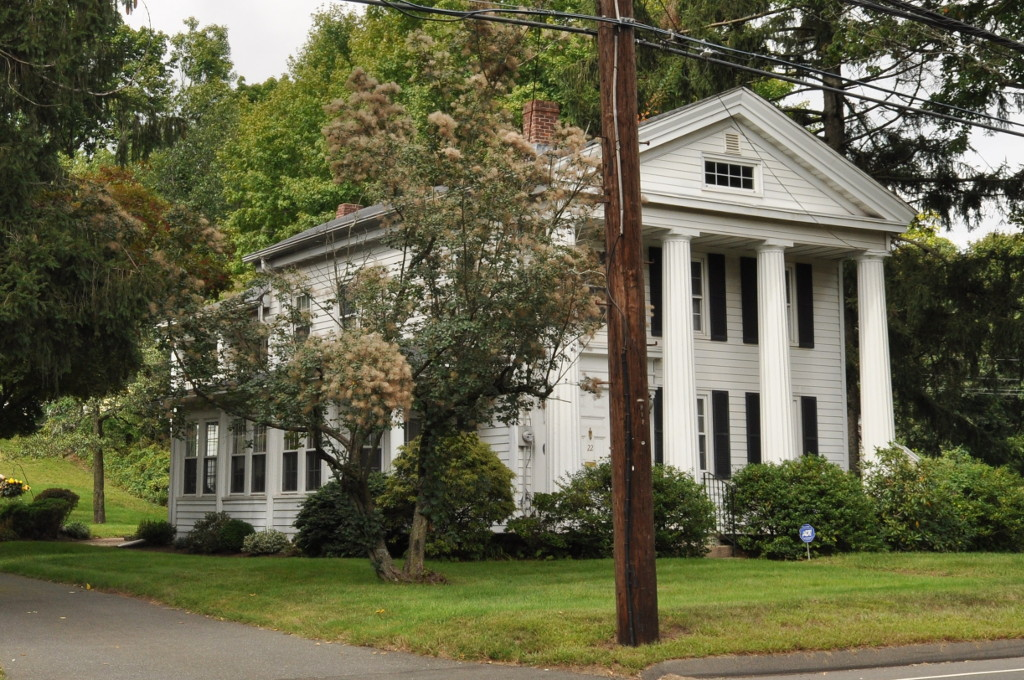

- Location within Connecticut Location within the United States
- Location: 3-17 Bishop Street, 70-99 Old Broadway, 2-10 Philip Place, 9-56 State Street, North Haven, Connecticut
- Coordinates: 41°23′24″N 72°52′18″W
- Area: 40 acres (16 ha)
- Architect: Linsley, Solomon Fowler; Et al.
- Architectural style: Greek Revival, Queen Anne, Georgian
- NRHP reference No.: 88000577
- Added to NRHP: May 27, 1988

The Pines Bridge Historic District encompasses a historic industrial and commercial village in North Haven, Connecticut. Located just West of the Town Green and centered around the Broadway Bridge over the Quinnipiac River, the village developed first as a commercial hub around a 17th-century bridge at the site, and then as a small industrial village in the 19th century. Now mainly residential, it was listed on the National Register of Historic Places in 1988.

== Description and history ==
The Pines is a name historically associated with the head of navigation of the Quinnipiac River, which was first settled in the 1670s. Construction of a bridge made the area a small commercial center, serving travelers on the road connecting New Haven and Hartford (now roughly State Street). The area developed in the early 19th century as a brickmaking center, a business which expanded after the railroad (whose line forms the district's eastern boundary) arrived by 1840. It became the principal commercial area of North Haven by the 1850s, but declined in importance in the mid-20th century due to increased automobile use and the construction of Interstate 91, which separated the area from the town center.

The historic district is 40 acres (16 ha) in size, and consists of two sections, joined by the Broadway bridge. The western section is roughly L-shaped, extending along State Street on either side of the Broadway junction, and then west along Bishop Street. The eastern section consists of a lobe of land south of Broadway and Old Broadway, which is bounded on the east by the railroad and the west and south by the river. A cluster of fine houses stand along State and Bishop Streets, most dating to the first half of the 19th century. More densely built housing lines the west side of Philip Place. There is now only one formerly industrial building in the district; it is a former carriage factory at 9 State Street which has been converted to residential use.

== See also ==
- National Register of Historic Places listings in New Haven County, Connecticut
