= Connecticut Route 70 =

State highway in New Haven County, Connecticut, US

Route 70
- Map of New Haven County in southern Connecticut with Route 70 highlighted in red

Route information
- Maintained by CTDOT
- Length: 10.92 mi (17.57 km)
- Existed: 1932–present

Major junctions
- West end: I-84 in Cheshire
- East end: Route 71 in Meriden

Location
- Country: United States
- State: Connecticut
- Counties: New Haven

Highway system
- Connecticut State Highway System; Interstate; US; State; SSR; SR; Scenic
← Route 69	→ Route 71

Route 70 is a 10.92-mile-long (17.57 km) state highway in the U.S. state of Connecticut, connecting the towns of Cheshire and Meriden. The western half of the route is an important link between the Greater New Haven and the Greater Waterbury areas and is part of the state primary highway system. It runs in a “U” Shaped Pattern.

== Route description ==
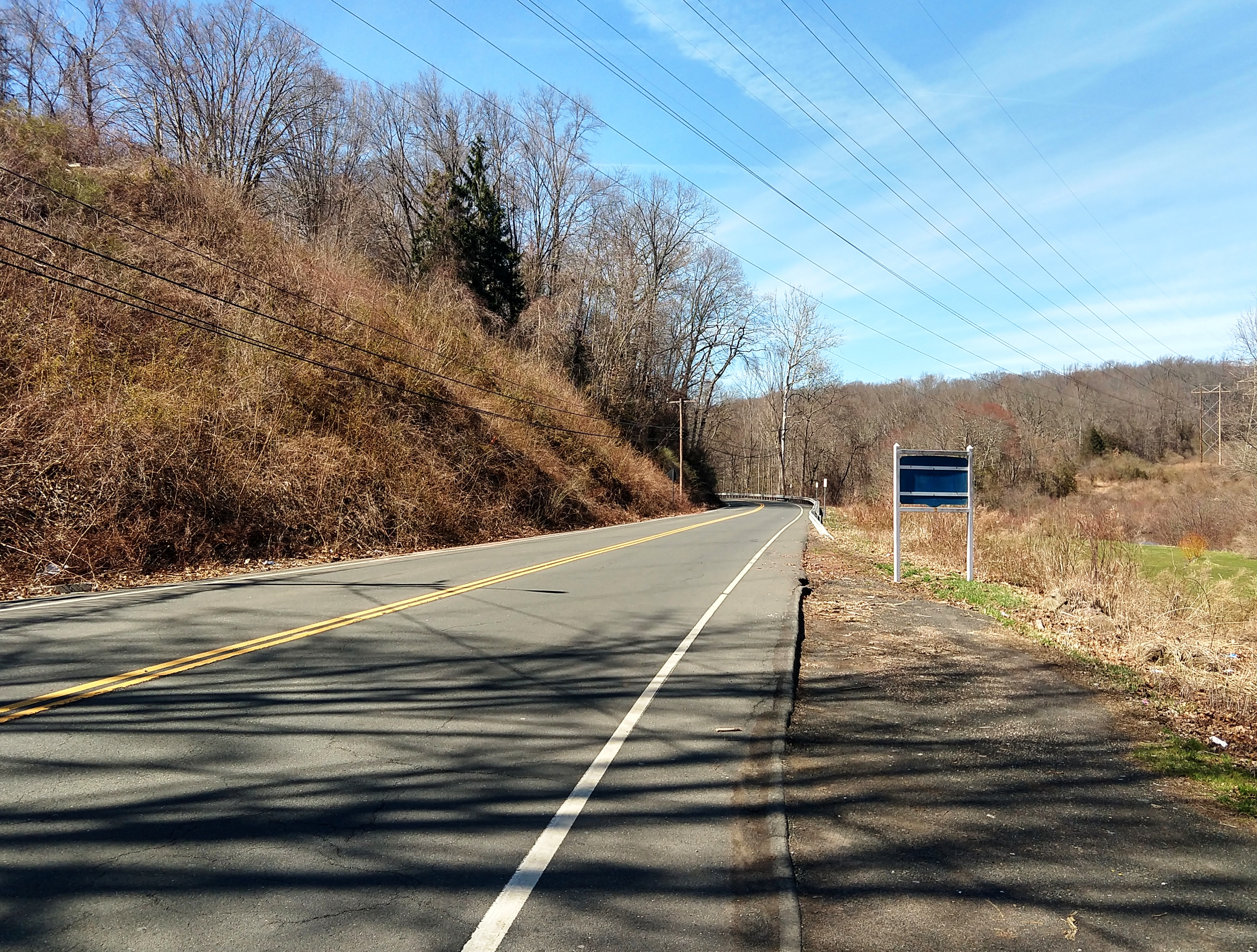
Route 70 westbound past Oregon Road in Meriden

Route 70 officially begins as a continuation of SR 801, known locally as Waterbury Road, at its interchange with Interstate 84 (I-84) at exit 38 in Cheshire. Route 70 proceeds southeast on Waterbury Road into the Mixville section of Cheshire, then meets Route 68 about 2.4 miles (3.9 km) east of the I-84 junction. Routes 68 and 70 become concurrent as they proceed east along West Main Street and Main Street into Cheshire center. After a brief (0.15 mi) three-way overlap with Route 10, Routes 68 and 70 continue eastward together as Academy Road for another 1.2 miles (1.9 km). Route 68 then splits off to the east towards Wallingford while Route 70 heads northeast towards Meriden (as South Meriden Road). The Route 68/70 overlap is 2.9 miles (4.7 km) long. Route 70 enters the city of Meriden, where the road name changes to River Road. Route 70 follows River Road for about 1.6 miles (2.6 km) then turns onto Main Street. After crossing the Quinnipiac River, Route 70 turns southeast onto Hanover Avenue, ending after another 0.8 miles (1.3 km) at Route 71. Route 70 carries average traffic volumes of about 15,400 vehicles per day west of Route 10 and about 6,300 vehicles per day east of Route 10.

== History ==
The route directly connecting downtown Waterbury and Cheshire center was first improved in 1852 by the Waterbury and Cheshire Plank Road Company, which had built the toll road. The company continued operating the toll road until 1880 when the company charter was repealed by the Connecticut General Assembly. In 1922, the Waterbury to Cheshire road was designated as a secondary state highway known as Highway 323. Highway 323 began at the intersection of Meriden Road and East Main Street and followed East Main Street towards Cheshire. In Cheshire, Highway 323 followed modern Route 70 until the junction with Highland Avenue (modern Route 10). In the 1932 state highway renumbering, modern Route 70 was created from old Highway 323 plus an extension east of Route 10 along a previously unnumbered road to the South Meriden section of the city of Meriden. The original eastern terminus was at Hanover Road (then Route 71) just after crossing the Quinnipiac River. The route was extended by 1955 along New Hanover Avenue to Old Colony Road (then US 5A). In 1962, Route 70 took over the former south end of Route 71 (Hanover Avenue) to its modern terminus at Old Colony Road (modern Route 71) after Route 71 was relocated to the former US 5A. In 1964, Route 70 was truncated in the west so that it now began at the I-84 Interchange 26 westbound onramp. The former Route 70 in Waterbury was redesignated as unsigned State Road 801.

== Junction list ==
The entire route is in New Haven County.

Location	mi	km	Destinations	Notes
Cheshire	0.00	0.00	Waterbury Road (SR 801 west)	Continuation west
Cheshire	0.00	0.00	I-84 – Waterbury, Hartford	Exit 38 on I-84
Cheshire	2.67	4.30	Route 68 west – Prospect, Union City	Western end of Route 68 concurrency
Cheshire	4.36	7.02	Route 10 north – Southington	Western end of Route 10 concurrency
Cheshire	4.51	7.26	Route 10 south – Hamden, New Haven	Eastern end of Route 10 concurrency
Cheshire	5.76	9.27	Route 68 east – Yalesville, Durham	Eastern end of Route 68 concurrency
Meriden	10.92	17.57	Route 71 – Berlin, Wallingford	Eastern terminus
1.000 mi = 1.609 km; 1.000 km = 0.621 mi
