= H. D. Smith Company Building =

- U.S. National Register of Historic Places
- U.S. Historic district – Contributing property
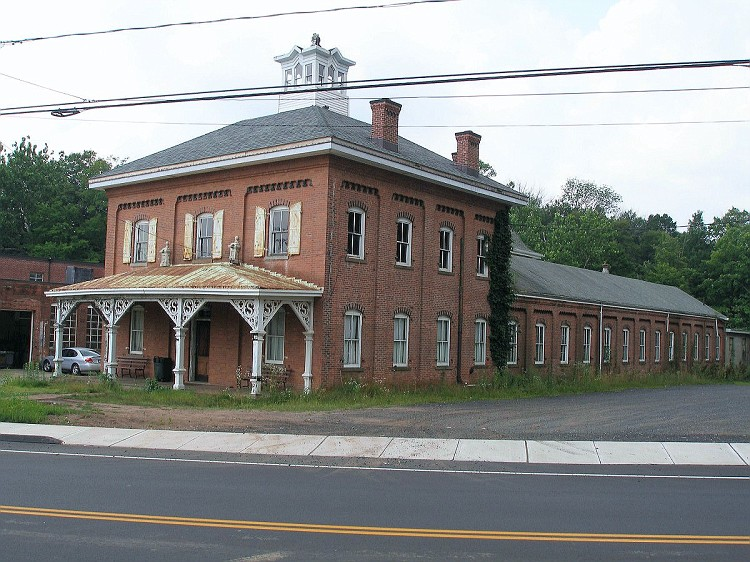

- Location within Connecticut Location within the United States
- Location: 24 West Street, Plantsville, Connecticut
- Coordinates: 41°35′19″N 72°53′56″W
- Area: 1.9 acres (0.77 ha)
- Built: 1882
- Part of: Plantsville Historic District (ID88002673)
- MPS: Historic Industrial Complexes of Southington TR (AD)
- NRHP reference No.: 77001420

Significant dates
- Added to NRHP: September 19, 1977
- Designated CP: December 1, 1988

The H. D. Smith Company Building (also known as the American Standard Company Building) is a historic industrial building at 24 West Street in Plantsville, Connecticut. With a construction history dating to 1882, it is one of the more architecturally interesting examples of Southington's industrial architecture, and was home to H. D. Smith & Co. from construction to the 1920s. It was listed on the National Register of Historic Places in 1977.

== Description and history ==
The former H. D. Smith Company complex is located in the Plantsville area of southwestern Southington, on the west side of West Street a short way north of its junction with West Main Street. It is located between West Street and the Eightmile River, which runs at the rear of the property and historically provided the facility's power. The building has two parts, both built out of red brick: the front section is two stories in height, with a truncated hip roof topped by a square cupola, and the rear section is a long single-story gable-roofed structure. The building's bays are articulated as recessed panels, with brick corbelling at the top. The front section has a single-story hip-roof porch extending across its front, with chamfered square posts rising to brackets with jigsawn spandrels. Windows are set in segmented-arch openings, with headers that use alternating red and black bricks.

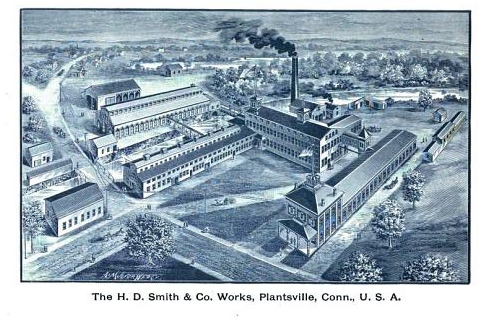
H. D. Smith & Co. Works. Plantsville, Connecticut in 1893

The H. D. Smith & Co. was founded in 1850 by Henry D. Smith, who had invented machinery for automating the manufacture of previously handmade iron parts for carriages. Originally located in Meriden, Smith moved the company to Plantsville, and built this factory around 1882. It was originally much larger, having a large U shape with an open courtyard, and was considered a local showpiece of design. The surviving building represents the northernmost leg of the U. The company shifted to the production of bicycle parts in the 1890s, and the manufacture of toolkits for automobiles in the early 20th century. It failed in the 1920s, after which the factory stood vacant. In 1938 it was purchased by the Florian family, who owned the American Standard Company, a maker of gardening tools. In August 2015, the building, as well of the remainder of the old H. D. Smith & Co. Works, was purchased by Jon Rondeau, with plans to turn it into a high-end whiskey and bourbon distillery.

== See also ==
- National Register of Historic Places listings in Southington, Connecticut
