= H. D. Smith & Co. =

Tool manufacturing company

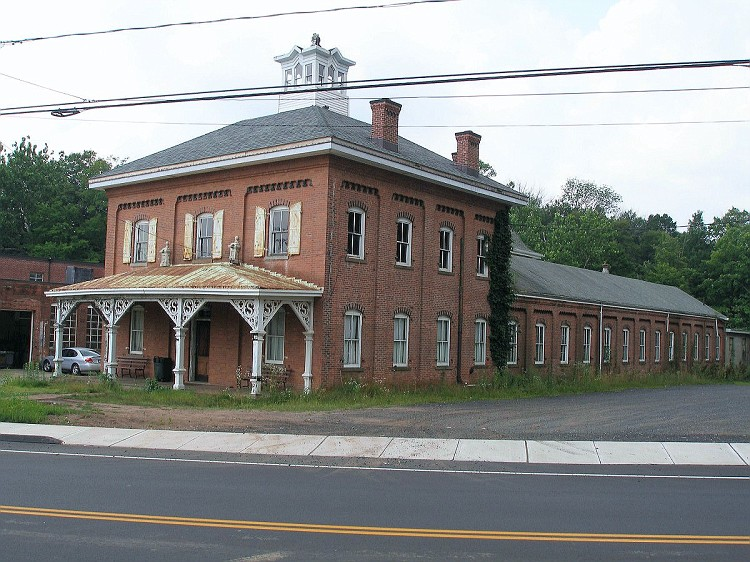
- Industry: Manufacturing
- Founded: 1850
- Headquarters: 24 West St., Plantsville, Connecticut
- Key people: Henry D. Smith, president (1850–1898)
- Products: Carriage, wagon and sleigh forgings

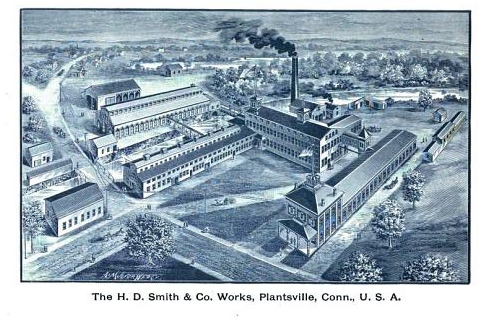
H. D. Smith & Co. Works. Plantsville, Connecticut, cir. 1883

H. D. Smith & Co. was a tool manufacturing company based in Plantsville, Connecticut, founded by Henry D. Smith in 1850.

H.D. Smith & Co. hardware works was originally in Meriden, Connecticut, and began as a supplier to the carriage makers of New Haven, Connecticut. H.D. Smith later moved to Plantsville, Connecticut, where the company originally used leased facilities until they were able to move into the H.D. Smith & Co. works.

H. D. Smith was one of the originators of the drop-forging process, and was described by The New York Times as being one of the pioneers of the carriage hardware industry.

Around 1900, the company shifted production to bicycle parts and tool kits for automobiles.

== Staff ==
- Henry D. Smith, president (1850–1898)
- G. F. Smith, secretary
- E. W. Twitchell, treasurer
- W. S. Ward, superintendent
- E. P. Hotchkis
- L. V. Walkley, president
- Louis H. Schmitt, secretary
- George R. Bond, treasurer
- William. S. Ward, general superintendent (1883–April 11, 1909)

== See also ==
- List of defunct consumer brands
