= Robert Chatfield =

American politician

Mayor of Prospect, Connecticut
- Incumbent
- Assumed office November 7, 1977
- Preceded by: George Sabo

Personal details
- Born: 1943 (age 82–83) Prospect, Connecticut
- Party: Republican
- Spouse: Ginny
- Children: 1

Robert J. Chatfield (born 1943), known colloquially as Mayor Bob, is an American politician who has served as the mayor of Prospect, Connecticut since 1977. A member of the Republican Party, he was elected to his 24th term in 2023, making him the longest-serving elected official in Connecticut.

== Career ==
After going through the Prospect school system, Chatfield graduated from W.F. Kaynor Technical High School in the neighboring city of Waterbury, Connecticut. He then served in the United States Air Force from 1961 to 1965 and was stationed in Germany for three years.

Chatfield has many roles in Prospect in addition to being mayor. He has been a member of the Prospect Volunteer Fire Department for over 40 years, during which he served as Chief and Assistant Chief. Chatfield currently serves as the Fire Department's Day Commander.

Chatfield was later investigated by police on claims that he harassed a female employee.

== See also ==
- List of longest-serving mayors in the United States
