= Interstate 691 =

Interstate Highway in Connecticut

Interstate 691
- Henry D. Altobello Highway
- I-691 highlighted in red

Route information
- Auxiliary route of I-91
- Maintained by CTDOT
- Length: 8.38 mi (13.49 km)
- Existed: 1988 (completed)–present
- NHS: Entire route

Major junctions
- West end: I-84 in Southington
- US 5 in Meriden; Route 15 / Wilbur Cross Parkway in Meriden
- East end: I-91 / Route 66 in Meriden

Location
- Country: United States
- State: Connecticut
- Counties: Hartford, New Haven

Highway system
- Interstate Highway System; Main; Auxiliary; Suffixed; Business; Future; Connecticut State Highway System; Interstate; US; State; SSR; SR; Scenic
← I-684	→ US 1

Interstate 691 (I-691) is an auxiliary Interstate Highway in Connecticut beginning at I-91 in Meriden and ending at I-84 near the Cheshire–Southington town line. According to the Federal Highway Administration, it is 8.38 miles (13.49 km) in length; however, the Connecticut Department of Transportation (CTDOT) includes the 0.54 miles (0.87 km) of the exit ramp that I-691 uses to the merge with westbound I-84, making their recorded length 8.92 miles (14.36 km) long.

I-691 is also known as the Henry D. Altobello Highway for its entire length.

== Route description ==
I-691 is the main east–west highway of the city of Meriden. The freeway actually begins in Middlefield as Route 66, technically becoming I-691 at the junction with I-91 (exit 1A). However, westbound signage indicates I-691 begins at the start of the freeway (just west of exit 1), while eastbound signage shows I-691 ending at the Route 15 interchange (at eastbound exit 1B about 0.5 miles [0.80 km] west of the interchange with I-91). To go from I-91 northbound to I-691 westbound (or from I-691 eastbound to I-91 southbound), one must actually use Route 15. Exit 1C westbound provides access to Route 15 north.

West of the I-91/Route 15 interchange, I-691 meets US Route 5 (US 5), which provides access to Route 15 north for eastbound traffic. Exit 2B provides access to Downtown Meriden. Westbound traffic exits onto State Street Extension, while eastbound traffic enters onto Columbia Street. Exit 3 provide access to Route 71, as well as access to Meriden Mall. Exit 3 to Lewis Avenue, while exit 3 directly to Route 71. From here, I-691 passes along the north side of Hubbard Park as well as by Castle Craig before it crosses into Southington. It then meets the eastern end of Route 322 at exit 5. It then crosses the Quinnipiac River into Cheshire, where it has an interchange with Route 10, then continues west to end at I-84 at the Southington–Cheshire Town line. The highway officially ends as it merges into I-84 west.

== History ==

In the 1940s, the I-691 routing was part of a planned US 6A expressway from Southington to Willimantic. A section of the expressway (from its Middlefield terminus west to exit 8) first opened in 1966. By 1968, the US 6A designation was dropped in favor of Route 66. The highway was extended west to exit 4 by 1971. The connection to I-84 was eventually completed in 1987, with the renumbering to I-691 done at the same time. The portion east of I-91 remained as Route 66. Environmental and community groups successfully blocked attempts to extend the freeway east of its present terminus due to potential impacts on the Mt. Higby Reservoir, which provides drinking water for the local area. A compromise was reached in the late 1990s allowing CTDOT to convert Route 66 from a two-lane road to four lanes from the eastern end of the I-691 freeway to the business district in Middletown. Construction on the Route 66 widening project was completed in 2005.

== Exit list ==
Exits were converted to mileage-based exit numbering in April 2023.

County	Location	mi	km	Old exit	New exit	Destinations	Notes
Hartford	Southington	8.38	13.49	1	8B	I-84 west – Waterbury	Western terminus
Hartford	Southington	7.96	12.81	2	8A	I-84 east – Hartford	Westbound exit and eastbound entrance; exit 40A on I-84
New Haven	Cheshire	6.97	11.22	3	7	Route 10 – Cheshire, Plantsville	
Hartford–New Haven county line	Southington–Meriden line	4.78	7.69	4	5	Route 322 – Southington	Eastern terminus of Route 322
New Haven	Meriden	3.02	4.86	5	3	Route 71 (Chamberlain Highway)	Eastbound exit and westbound entrance
New Haven	Meriden	2.47	3.98	6	3	To Route 71 (Chamberlain Highway)	Westbound exit and eastbound entrance; access via Lewis Avenue
New Haven	Meriden	2.36– 1.71	3.80– 2.75	7	2B	Downtown Meriden	Access via Columbia Street eastbound, State Street westbound
New Haven	Meriden	1.31	2.11	8	2A	US 5 – Downtown Meriden	
New Haven	Meriden	0.40	0.64	10	1B	Route 15 south (Wilbur Cross Parkway) to I-91 south – New Haven	Eastbound exit and westbound entrance
New Haven	Meriden	0.40	0.64	9	1C	Route 15 north (Wilbur Cross Parkway)	Westbound exit only; Wilbur Cross Parkway signed as Berlin Turnpike
New Haven	Meriden	0.00	0.00	10-11	1A-B	I-91 to Route 15 south (Wilbur Cross Parkway) – Hartford, New Haven	No eastbound access to I-91 south; signed as exits 1A (I-91 north) and 1B (I-91 south/Route 15 south)
New Haven	Meriden	0.00	0.00	—	—	Route 66 east – Middlefield, Middletown	Continuation east to East Main Street
1.000 mi = 1.609 km; 1.000 km = 0.621 mi: Incomplete access
