= Cheshire Village, Connecticut =

Census-designated place in Connecticut, United States

- Census-designated place
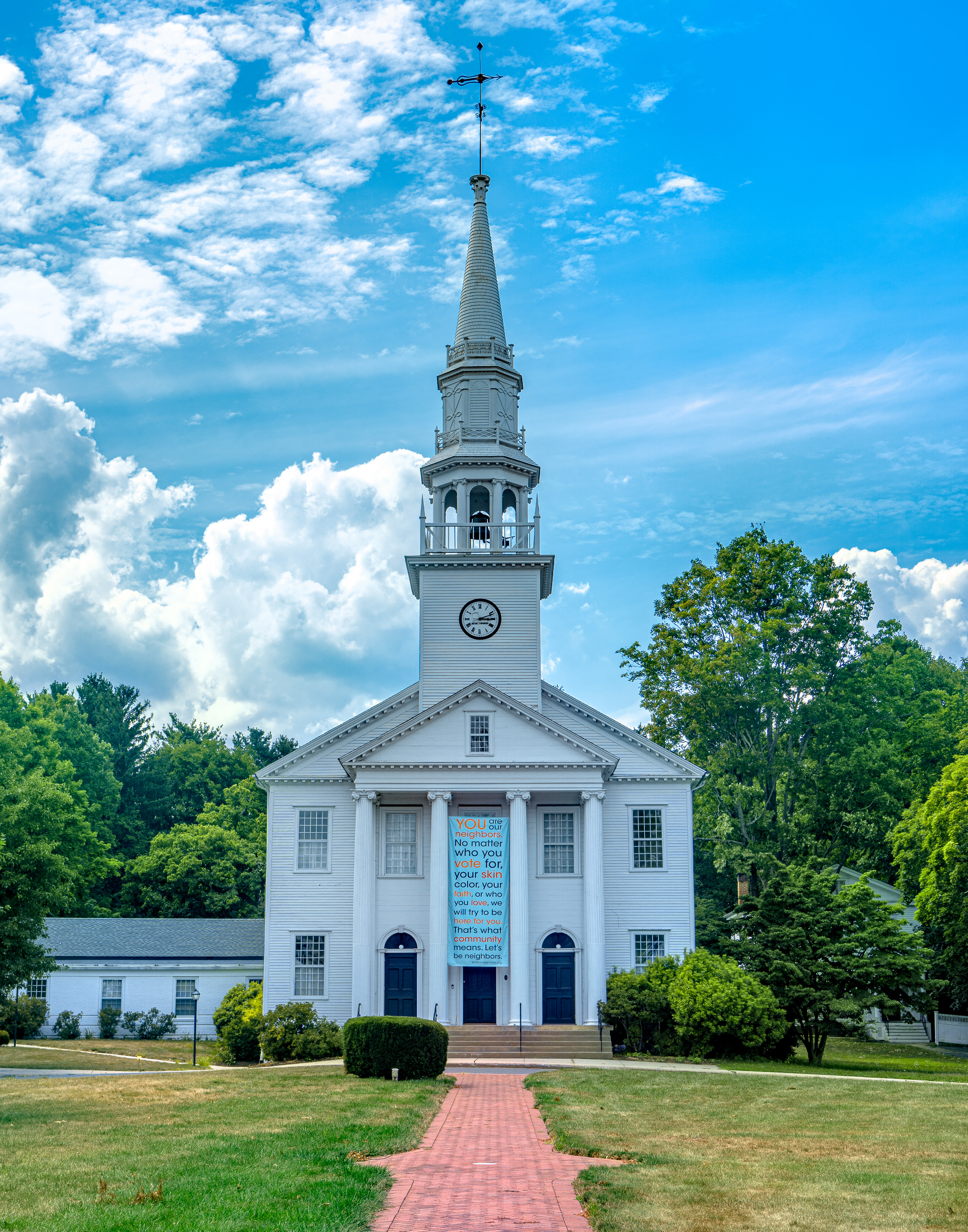
- First Congregational Church

- Location within Connecticut Location within the United States
- Coordinates: 41°30′0″N 72°54′3″W
- Country: United States
- State: Connecticut
- County: New Haven
- Town: Cheshire

Area
  - Total: 4.00 sq mi (10.36 km^{2})
  - Land: 4.00 sq mi (10.36 km^{2})
  - Water: 0 sq mi (0.0 km^{2})
- Elevation: 266 ft (81 m)

Population (2010)
  - Total: 5,786
  - Density: 1,446/sq mi (558.2/km^{2})
- Time zone: UTC-5 (Eastern (EST))
  - Summer (DST): UTC-4 (EDT)
- ZIP Code: 06410 (Cheshire)
- Area codes: 203/475
- FIPS code: 09-14200
- GNIS feature ID: 2378345

Cheshire Village is a census-designated place (CDP) comprising the primary village and adjacent residential land in the town of Cheshire, New Haven County, Connecticut, United States. It is in the center of the town, surrounding the intersections of Connecticut Routes 10, 70, and 68.

As of the 2020 census, Cheshire Village had a population of 6,499.

== Demographics ==
=== 2020 census ===
As of the 2020 census, Cheshire Village had a population of 6,499. The median age was 46.6 years. 21.6% of residents were under the age of 18 and 22.6% of residents were 65 years of age or older. For every 100 females there were 92.0 males, and for every 100 females age 18 and over there were 88.4 males age 18 and over.

100.0% of residents lived in urban areas, while 0.0% lived in rural areas.

There were 2,534 households in Cheshire Village, of which 28.7% had children under the age of 18 living in them. Of all households, 55.2% were married-couple households, 14.2% were households with a male householder and no spouse or partner present, and 27.5% were households with a female householder and no spouse or partner present. About 28.9% of all households were made up of individuals and 17.7% had someone living alone who was 65 years of age or older.

There were 2,637 housing units, of which 3.9% were vacant. The homeowner vacancy rate was 1.4% and the rental vacancy rate was 6.4%.

Racial composition as of the 2020 census
| Race | Number | Percent |
|---|---|---|
| White | 5,448 | 83.8% |
| Black or African American | 144 | 2.2% |
| American Indian and Alaska Native | 9 | 0.1% |
| Asian | 371 | 5.7% |
| Native Hawaiian and Other Pacific Islander | 1 | 0.0% |
| Some other race | 125 | 1.9% |
| Two or more races | 401 | 6.2% |
| Hispanic or Latino (of any race) | 383 | 5.9% |
