= Regional School District 16 (Connecticut) =

School district in Connecticut, United States

Address
- 30 Coer Road Prospect, Connecticut, 06712; United States

District information
- Type: Public
- Grades: PreK–12
- NCES District ID: 0903538

Students and staff
- Students: 1,992
- Teachers: 161.1
- Staff: 247.25
- Student–teacher ratio: 12.36

Other information
- Website: www.region16ct.org

Regional School District 16 is a school district made up of the towns of Beacon Falls and Prospect in New Haven County, Connecticut. It is currently run by Superintendent of Schools Michael Yamin.

== History ==
In 2014, the district rolled out plans for a three-part construction project that would take place over the following years: renovations to Laurel Ledge, a new elementary school for Prospect students, and a new district office.

At the closing of the 2014–2015 school year, construction of Prospect Elementary School was completed. Algonquin School, which previously held students grades K-3, was demolished shortly afterwards, with a new district office built on site.

Beginning with the 2016–2017 school year, the district rolled out plans for a 1:1 initiative, which allocates a Chromebook to every student at Woodland Regional High School.

== Prospect BoE Members ==
Mr. Robert Hiscox - BOE Chair (2013-2017)Member: Personnel and Negotiations Committee

Ms. Daisy Laone (2015-2019) Member: Wellness Committee, Professional Development Committee, Curriculum Committee, Technology Committee

Mr. Nazih Noujaim (2013-2017) Chair: Technology Committee Member: Facilities and Transportation Committee, Policy Committee

Ms. Roxann Vaillancourt (2015-2019) Chair:Public Communications Committee, Policy Committee Member: Curriculum Committee,

== Beacon Falls BoE Members ==
Mrs. Priscilla Cretella BOE Vice-Chair (2015-2019) Chair: Personnel and Negotiations Committee Member: Facilities and Transportation Committee, Public Communications Committee

Mrs. Christine Arnold (2013-2017) Chair:Recognition Committee Member: Personnel and NegotiationsCommittee, Policy Committee

Mr. Erik Dey (2017-2021) Chair: Curriculum Committee Member: Technology Committee, Professional Development Committee

Mr. David Rybinski (2015-2019) Chair: Facilities and Transportation Committee, Public Communications Committee

== Schools ==
- Laurel Ledge Elementary School
- Prospect Elementary School
- Long River Middle School
- Woodland Regional High School

=== Former Schools ===
- Algonquin School
- Community School
