= Grannis Island =

Island in Connecticut, United States

Coordinates: 41°18′57″N 72°52′58″W

Grannis Island is an uninhabited island in the Quinnipiac River in New Haven, Connecticut. It is owned by the New Haven Land Trust as part of the Eugene B. Fargeorge Nature Preserve at Quinnipiac Meadows.

The island was inhabited by Quinnipiac Native Americans in historic times. Archeological digs have identified dog burials, middens, fire pits and other signs of human habitation.
