= Connecticut Route 364 =

State highway in Hartford County, Connecticut, US

Route 364

- Map of Hartford County in northern Connecticut with Route 364 highlighted in red

Route information
- Maintained by CTDOT
- Length: 4.56 mi (7.34 km)
- Existed: 1963–present

Major junctions
- West end: Route 120 in Southington
- East end: Route 71 in Berlin

Location
- Country: United States
- State: Connecticut
- Counties: Hartford

Highway system
- Connecticut State Highway System; Interstate; US; State; SSR; SR; Scenic
← Route 361	→ Route 372

Route 364 is a state highway in central Connecticut running from Southington to Berlin.

== Route description ==
Route 364 begins at an intersection with Route 120 near the Southington town center and heads east to Berlin. In Berlin, it continues northeast and east to end at an intersection with Route 71.

== History ==
Route 364 was commissioned from SR 564 in 1963 and has had no significant changes since. SR 564 was designated only the year before as part of the 1962 Route Reclassification Act.

== Junction list ==
The entire route is in Hartford County.

Location	mi	km	Destinations	Notes
Southington	0.00	0.00	Route 120 – Downtown Southington, Meriden	Western terminus
Berlin	4.56	7.34	Route 71 – Meriden, Kensington	Eastern terminus
1.000 mi = 1.609 km; 1.000 km = 0.621 mi
