= Prospect, Connecticut =

- Town
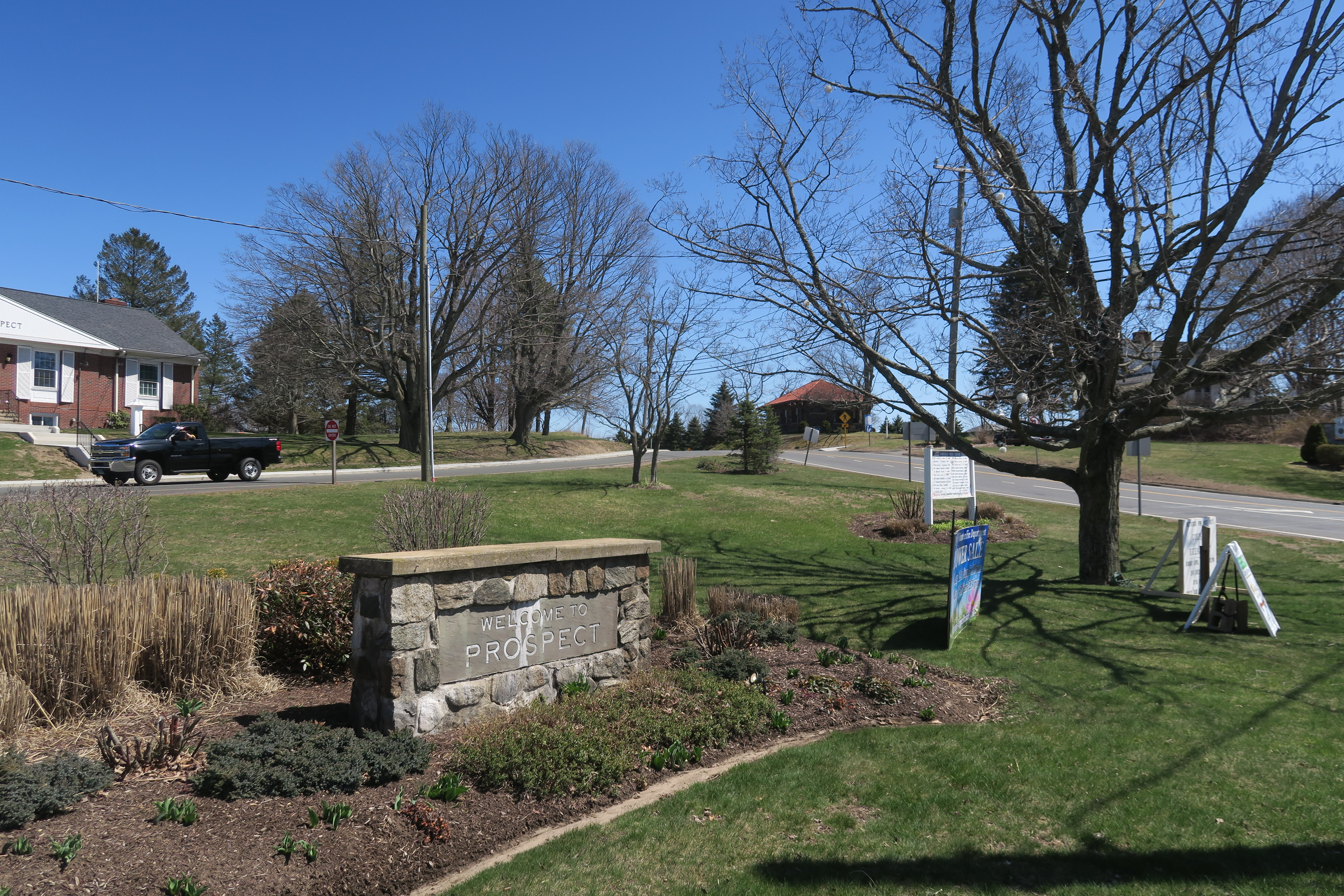
- Welcome to Prospect

- Flag Seal

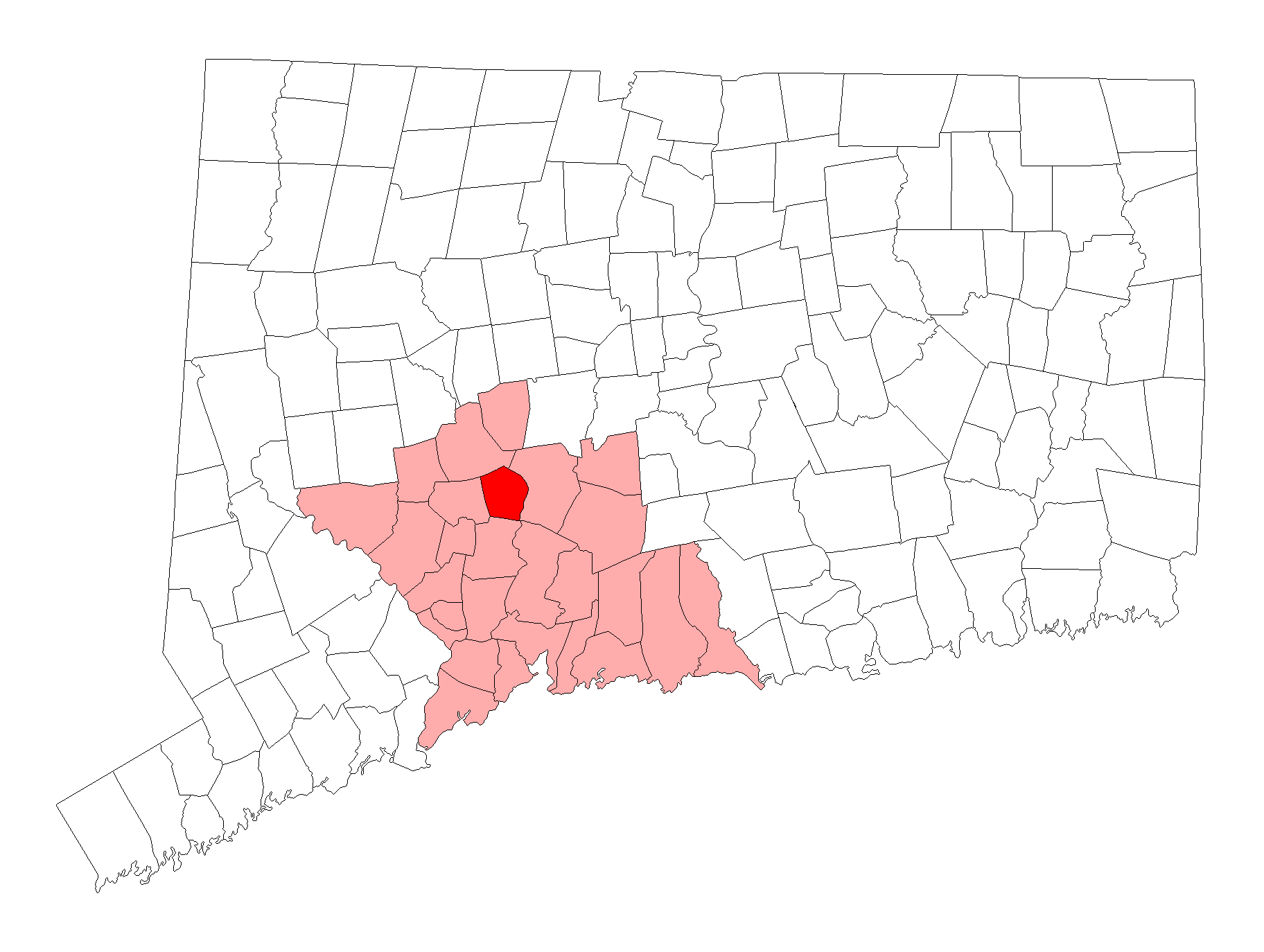
- Coordinates: 41°29′58″N 72°58′31″W
- Country: United States
- U.S. state: Connecticut
- County: New Haven
- Region: Naugatuck Valley
- Settled: 1710s
- Incorporated: 1827

Government
  - Type: Mayor-council
  - Mayor: Robert J. Chatfield (R)
  - Town Council: Michael Palmerie, Jr. (R); Richard Blanc (R); Jeffrey B. Slapikas (R); Stanley Pilat (R); Megan Patchkofsky (R); Kathyn F. Zandri (D); Patricia S. Geary (D); Larry Fitzgerald (D); Theresa C. Graveline (D)

Area
  - Total: 14.5 sq mi (37.6 km^{2})
  - Land: 14.3 sq mi (37.1 km^{2})
  - Water: 0.23 sq mi (0.6 km^{2})
- Elevation: 823 ft (251 m)

Population (2020)
  - Total: 9,401
  - Density: 656/sq mi (253/km^{2})
- Time zone: UTC-5 (Eastern)
  - Summer (DST): UTC-4 (Eastern)
- ZIP code: 06712
- Area codes: 203/475
- FIPS code: 09-62290
- GNIS feature ID: 0213493
- Website: townofprospect.gov

Prospect is a town in New Haven County, Connecticut, United States. It is a suburb of the nearby city of Waterbury to its north, and is on the north-eastern fringes of the New York metropolitan area. The population was estimated to be 9,401 in 2020. Prospect is part of the Waterbury NECTA and of the historical New Haven County. Prospect is also a member of the regional health district Chesprocott, along with Cheshire and Wolcott.

Prospect was incorporated as a town in 1827 from the South Farms part of Waterbury and the West Rocks part of Cheshire. Prospect is an exurban town, with residents often traveling to other major cities and employment centers across the state.

== History ==
It is believed that the Native Americans who lived in the area now known as Prospect first arrived to the area between 20,000 and 40,000 years ago. Little is known of their time living here, with only a few arrowheads, stone tools, and utensils being found in the town. What is known is that the town rested near the border zone of the Quinnipiac and Tunxis peoples, and it was known that the area served as a hunting and fishing ground for both tribes. There is no known evidence for any indigenous permanent settlement within the town prior to white European settlers permanently occupying the town. The portion of the town that was located in Waterbury also briefly had an indigenous reservation of 50 acres (20 ha) between 1731 and 1778. The reservation was located on today's Bronson Road, and did not have a large population, with a total of four inhabitants in 1774.

The first land record inside the town comes from a 1694 land record of John Moss, Jr., who owned 90 acres (36 ha) to 100 acres (40 ha) of land on "ye Tenn Mile river alongside an irremovable hill." The land was then first surveyed in 1697, and divided into four tracts, starting from the Waterbury border, and advancing towards Cheshire in half-mile intervals. Several roads in the town today follow the tier lines as outlined in the original survey, and the old border between Wallingford and Waterbury is seen in the modern-day Straitsville Road.

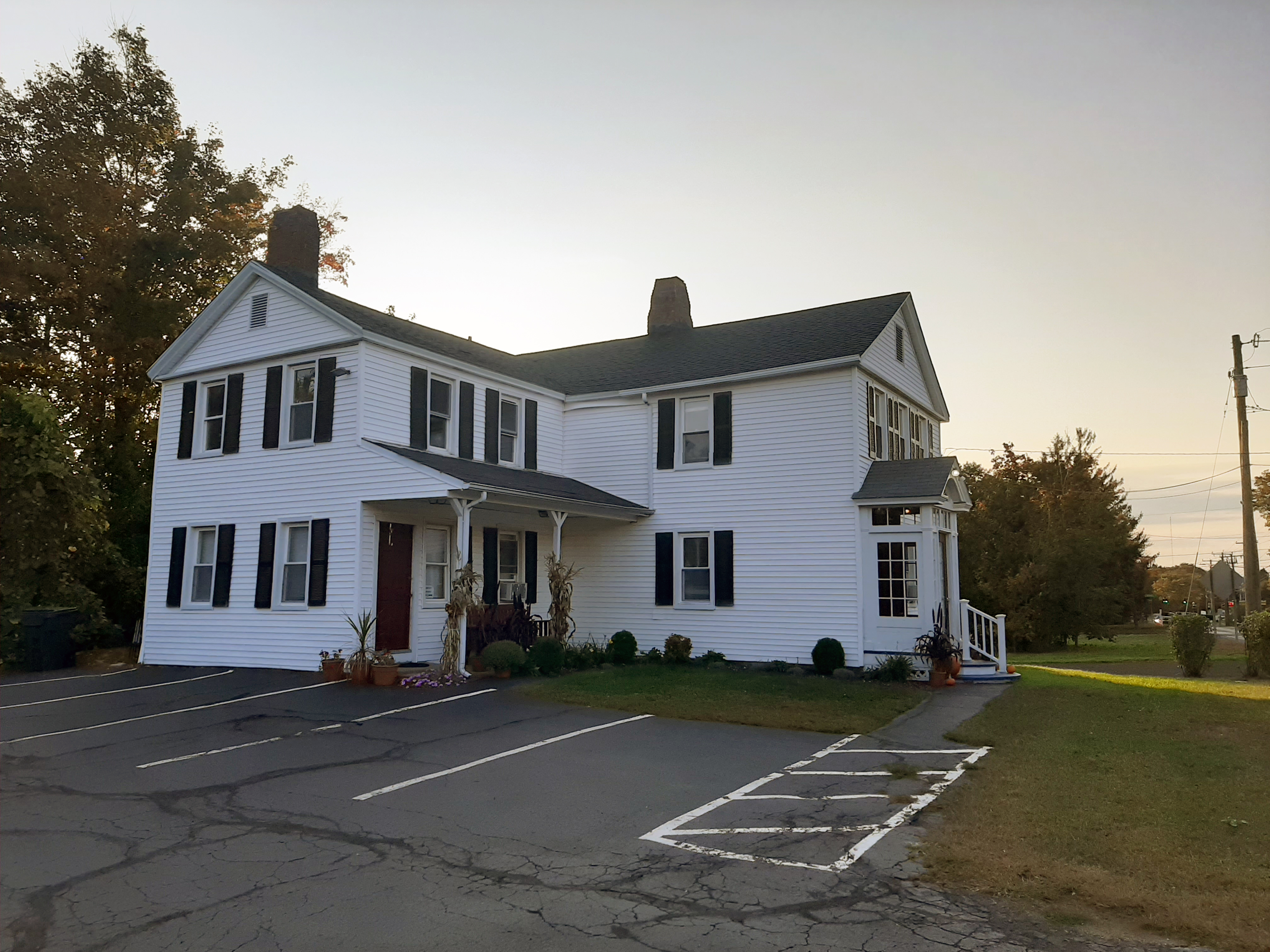
Harris Platt House, built c. 1803; the oldest standing building in Prospect

The first European settlers in what would become the town of Prospect arrived in 1712, building homes in the "West Rocks" near the then boundary line of Waterbury and Cheshire. In 1775, citizens petitioned both towns to establish their own church, which was denied. It was in 1778 that a separatist church was constructed, which gained the name Columbia church from its official title of "Society of Columbia." In 1797, through an act of the Connecticut General Assembly, the Congregational Church was established, governed by the "Columbia Company," earning the territory the name Columbia Parish until its incorporation as a municipality in 1827. The town was denied the name Columbia, owing to the already incorporated Columbia in Tolland County, and instead it was named Prospect. This name was chosen because of the view from the town green, which before the growth of the trees, one could observe Long Island Sound, the Connecticut River, and even Long Island on clear days.

The town's economic history has long been dominated by agriculture, with agricultural production never being eclipsed by manufacturing or services until the onset of suburbanization in the 1950s. The town used to produce wood, charcoal, hay, ice, apples, cider, milk, butter, cheese, eggs, wool, flax, corn, rye, barley, and oats. For some time, the town did have a manufacturing base. From the onset of the Industrial Revolution, farmers saw manufacturing as a way to supplement their incomes. Manufacturing activities that required water power were often located at the edges of the town, where the steep drops allowed for a large amount of power to be obtained. This led to the highest concentration of industry in the town being located in the Rag Hollow area, near the border of Cheshire. This section of town had factories that made sewing needles, britannia and pewter ware, cutlery, buttons, button hooks, hardware, and wagon wheels. The town was also where the first parlor matches were made in the United States, with the factory of Ives & Judd producing them. Other manufacturing was scattered around the town, often on the farms of those who owned the factories. These factories often moved locations. The town's brief foray into manufacturing came to a close by the twentieth century, with operations halting and entrepreneurs leaving for Waterbury, Naugatuck, Cheshire, or even New York.

Given the town's rural nature and sparse population, modern amenities developed slowly in the town. A telephone line was run through the town in 1898, connecting New Haven and Waterbury, but it was not until 1904 that a telephone was installed in the town. Electrification took place in 1929, when service was established along Route 69. At this time, the Grange hall, the Congregational church, and three street lights made up the initial electric customers. The town made use of dirt roads until the 1920s, where they were upgraded to gravel roads. Other than the two state highways, none of the roads in the towns were paved until 1968, when Asphalt concrete roads began to be installed across the town. The town had a post office from 1830 to 1902, when it was closed and covered by rural delivery until a post office was reopened in 1962. The town has no publicly available sewer service, and all extant hookups are privately funded. Since 2002, there has been limited availability of public water line connections on some roads, which is provided by Connecticut Water. Most town residents and businesses rely on septic systems for discharge, and wells for water. Regulation of these systems is managed by Chesprocott, the regional health authority.

Since the 1950s, the town has undergone a rapid period of suburbanization, as families fled the nearby city of Waterbury and other municipalities during the period of the national white flight. Between 1950 and 1969, 1,053 houses were built, which today makes up one third of Prospect's town housing. Today, 88.4% of the houses in the town have been built since 1950. Single family homes make up 90% of the housing stock in the town. In 1955, the "Black Friday Flood" inundated Naugatuck and Waterbury with flood waters, and Prospect became the primary evacuation center. Those who lost their homes found refugee in Prospect's Community School, where they received medical attention and temporary housing. This event helped to drive more residents to move to the town.

In 1977, Lorne J. Acquin murdered several members of his extended family. It was the largest mass murder in Connecticut history until the Sandy Hook Elementary School shooting.

Prospect is known locally as being "The Best Small Town in Connecticut," with the phrase posted on the town's trucks and website. The name originates from an early 1990s article in Connecticut Magazine which ranked Prospect as the worst small town in the entire state. The measurement was done based on its school system, economy, the cost of living, crime rate and cultural resources. In response to this, the town's long-time mayor Robert Chatfield removed the magazine from the library, and declared Prospect "The Best Small Town in Connecticut," and ordered it placed on town vehicles and bumper stickers.

== Geography ==
According to the United States Census Bureau, the town has a total area of 14.5 square miles (38 km^{2}), of which 14.3 square miles (37 km^{2}) is land and 0.2 square miles (0.52 km^{2}), or 1.58%, is water. Neighboring towns are Waterbury to the north, Cheshire to the east, Bethany to the south, and Naugatuck to the west.

The town is located among the far eastern hills of the Berkshires, and the hilly landscape dominates the town's geography. The town is notable for rocky soil, deposited during the retreat of the glaciers around 11,000 years ago. Trees in the town are relatively new, they had all once been cleared for farming and pastures. Oaks are the most abundant tree in the town, although in the swamp areas, the Red Maple dominates. The town has several reservoirs either fully or partially inside its boundaries. Several small streams and brooks also originate in the town.

=== Climate ===
According to the Köppen classification, Prospect is Dfb, or a humid continental climate. The town has warm and humid summers with cold winters. Precipitation is spread throughout the year, with thunderstorms frequent during the summer months, and heavy snowfalls during the winter months. Due to Prospect's elevation and location, temperatures are often colder, leading to snow in the town while lower towns to its east have rain. Like Connecticut, Prospect frequently experiences Nor'easters and Blizzards during the winter, which can bring heavy snowfall to the town.

Climate data for Ansonia (ANSONIA 1 NE, CT), elevation: 41.5 m or 136 ft, 2010–present normals, extremes 2010–present, precipitation 1966–present
Month	Jan	Feb	Mar	Apr	May	Jun	Jul	Aug	Sep	Oct	Nov	Dec	Year
Record high °F (°C)	74 (23)	73 (23)	75 (24)	84 (29)	93 (34)	96 (36)	99 (37)	96 (36)	95 (35)	84 (29)	76 (24)	64 (18)	99 (37)
Mean daily maximum °F (°C)	32.7 (0.4)	35.5 (1.9)	41.7 (5.4)	49.8 (9.9)	63.0 (17.2)	70.1 (21.2)	75.8 (24.3)	75.7 (24.3)	68.4 (20.2)	58.8 (14.9)	46.9 (8.3)	37.3 (2.9)	58.9 (14.9)
Daily mean °F (°C)	27.7 (−2.4)	31.8 (−0.1)	35.8 (2.1)	47.4 (8.6)	59.6 (15.3)	67.4 (19.7)	73.4 (23.0)	72.1 (22.3)	65.7 (18.7)	54.1 (12.3)	41.7 (5.4)	33.1 (0.6)	51.3 (10.7)
Mean daily minimum °F (°C)	23.0 (−5.0)	28.3 (−2.1)	30.4 (−0.9)	43.1 (6.2)	54.9 (12.7)	66.3 (19.1)	69.9 (21.1)	68.9 (20.5)	60.7 (15.9)	52.2 (11.2)	38.1 (3.4)	28.3 (−2.1)	38.1 (3.4)
Record low °F (°C)	−9 (−23)	−9 (−23)	4 (−16)	20 (−7)	30 (−1)	44 (7)	49 (9)	50 (10)	32 (0)	23 (−5)	13 (−11)	0 (−18)	−9 (−23)
Average precipitation inches (mm)	3.89 (99)	3.29 (84)	4.48 (114)	4.69 (119)	4.25 (108)	4.15 (105)	3.70 (94)	3.84 (98)	4.29 (109)	4.33 (110)	4.25 (108)	4.25 (108)	48.26 (1,226)
Average snowfall inches (cm)	6.5 (17)	8.1 (21)	3.5 (8.9)	0.2 (0.51)	0.0 (0.0)	0.0 (0.0)	0.0 (0.0)	0.0 (0.0)	0.0 (0.0)	trace	0.4 (1.0)	2.3 (5.8)	10.8 (27)
Source: NOAA

== Demographics ==
Historical population
Census	Pop.	Note	%±
1830	651		—
1840	548		−15.8%
1850	666		21.5%
1860	574		−13.8%
1870	551		−4.0%
1880	492		−10.7%
1890	445		−9.6%
1900	562		26.3%
1910	539		−4.1%
1920	266		−50.6%
1930	531		99.6%
1940	1,006		89.5%
1950	1,896		88.5%
1960	4,367		130.3%
1970	6,543		49.8%
1980	6,807		4.0%
1990	7,775		14.2%
2000	8,707		12.0%
2010	9,405		8.0%
2020	9,401		0.0%
U.S. Decennial Census

As of the 2010 Census, there were 9,405 people, 3,357 households, and 2,616 families living in the town. The population density was 608.1 inhabitants per square mile (234.8/km^{2}). There were 3,094 housing units at an average density of 216.1 per square mile (83.4/km^{2}). The racial makeup of the town was 95.3% White, 1.9% African American, 0.1% Native American, 0.8% Asian, 0.8% from other races, and 1.1% from two or more races. Hispanic or Latino of any race were 3.3% of the population.

Of the 3,357 households 32.4% had children under the age of 18 living with them, 66.3% were married couples living together, 7.9% had a female householder with no husband present, and 22.1% were non-families. 28.4% of households were one person and 8.4% were one person aged 65 or older. The average household size was 2.76 and the average family size was 3.15.

The age distribution was 22.6% under the age of 18, 7.5% from 18 to 24, 22.0% from 25 to 44, 32.7% from 45 to 64, and 15.2% 65 or older. The median age was 43.8 years. For every 100 females, there were 93.1 males. For every 100 females age 18 and over, there were 93.0 males.

The median household income was $93,631 and the median family income was $104,306. The per capita income for the town was $26,827. About 2.1% of families and 2.4% of the population were below the poverty line, including 3.1% of those under age 18 and 3.7% of those age 65 or over.

== Government ==
Prospect vote by party in presidential elections
Year	GOP	DEM	Others
2020	64.4% 3,935	34.5% 2,110	1.1% 66
2016	66.4% 3,701	29.8% 1,661	3.8% 214
2012	62.8% 3,235	35.7% 1,839	1.5% 75
2008	57.4% 2,982	41.1% 2,134	1.2% 81
2004	61.1% 2,983	37.0% 1,804	1.9% 93
2000	50.9% 2,310	43.7% 1,985	5.4% 247
1996	43.7% 1,845	41.4% 1,750	14.9% 630
1992	45.5% 2,118	24.6% 1,146	29.9% 1,377
1988	62.8% 2,379	36.1% 1,366	1.1% 42

The present mayor is Robert Chatfield, known to town residents as "Mayor Bob." First elected in 1977, Chatfield is the town's second mayor and for many residents is the only mayor they've ever known. He is the sixth longest serving incumbent mayor in the United States, and the longest serving Mayor in Connecticut. As of 2020, Chatfield is serving in his 22nd term as the town's chief executive.

Prospect operated under the Board of selectmen system of government until 1967, when it shifted to adopt a manager-council form of government. In 1975, the town adopted the mayor–council system of government. George Sabo, the incumbent chief administrative officer, won election as the town's first mayor over his Republican opponent, Ronald Dreher. Sabo won 1,636 votes to Dreher's 1,189. Chatfield, then a member of the town council, defeated Sabo in the 1977 election with 1,599 votes to Sabo's 1,311. Chatfield has been re-elected to the office ever since. His longevity in office has led him to become the only mayor residents have ever known.

Prospect's town council employs block voting in its elections. A total of nine members are elected every two years, and the town charter mandates that no political party have a majority larger than one seat. Since 1977, the town council has been controlled by the Republicans. Other elected officials include the Town Clerk, the Town Treasurer, the Tax Collector, members of the Board of Assessment Appeals, the Planning and Zoning Commission, the Zoning Board of Appeals, and seats to the Regional Board of Education.

The current town hall was built in 1961, and prior to that there was no dedicated building for the town's government. Just prior to the construction of the town hall the government met in the back of Oliver's Supermarket (now LaBonne's Market). Prior to this, the town government met at the local tavern (which no longer exists) until 1841. From there, it regularly met in the basement of the Congregational Church. Other locations that they met were the Grange hall, Community School, and Center School. The town's form of government remained mostly unchanged until the 1960s, when it underwent a rapid series of changes, first replacing the three selectmen system with just one First Selectman, then changing the position to Chief Administrative Officer, and finally in 1975 to Mayor. Prospect is the least populated town in Connecticut with a mayoral form of government.

== Education ==
Since 1969, the town of Prospect and the town of Beacon Falls have jointly operated Regional School District 16, with the first full school year having been operated in 1970. Both towns did not have access to a High School of their own, pursuant to the original intent of school district consolidation in Connecticut for small towns, and sought to consolidate their Boards of Education and begin research on the establishment of a new High School for district members. A high school would not be built in Region 16 until a 1998 referendum in the region approved the construction of Woodland Regional High School in Beacon Falls, with it opening on September 4, 2001. The two towns almost dissolved the regional school district in the late 1970s over the composition of the Board of Education, poor funding, and a lower quality of education for students. The composition of the Board of Education was originally slated to be split evenly between the two towns, which was agreed upon prior to the referendum approving the merger. According to a March 1976 Supreme Court ruling which upheld an earlier decision, the principle of One man, one vote applied to the Boards of Education of regional school districts. At the time, Connecticut had 16 regional school districts, and 11 regional school districts were in conflict with this ruling, which affected 34 towns, including Prospect and Beacon Falls. Beacon Falls then attempted to dissolve the regional school district, which at the time only officially contained Long River Middle School, on the basis that the Supreme Court ruling now constituted a breach of contract between Beacon Falls and Prospect.

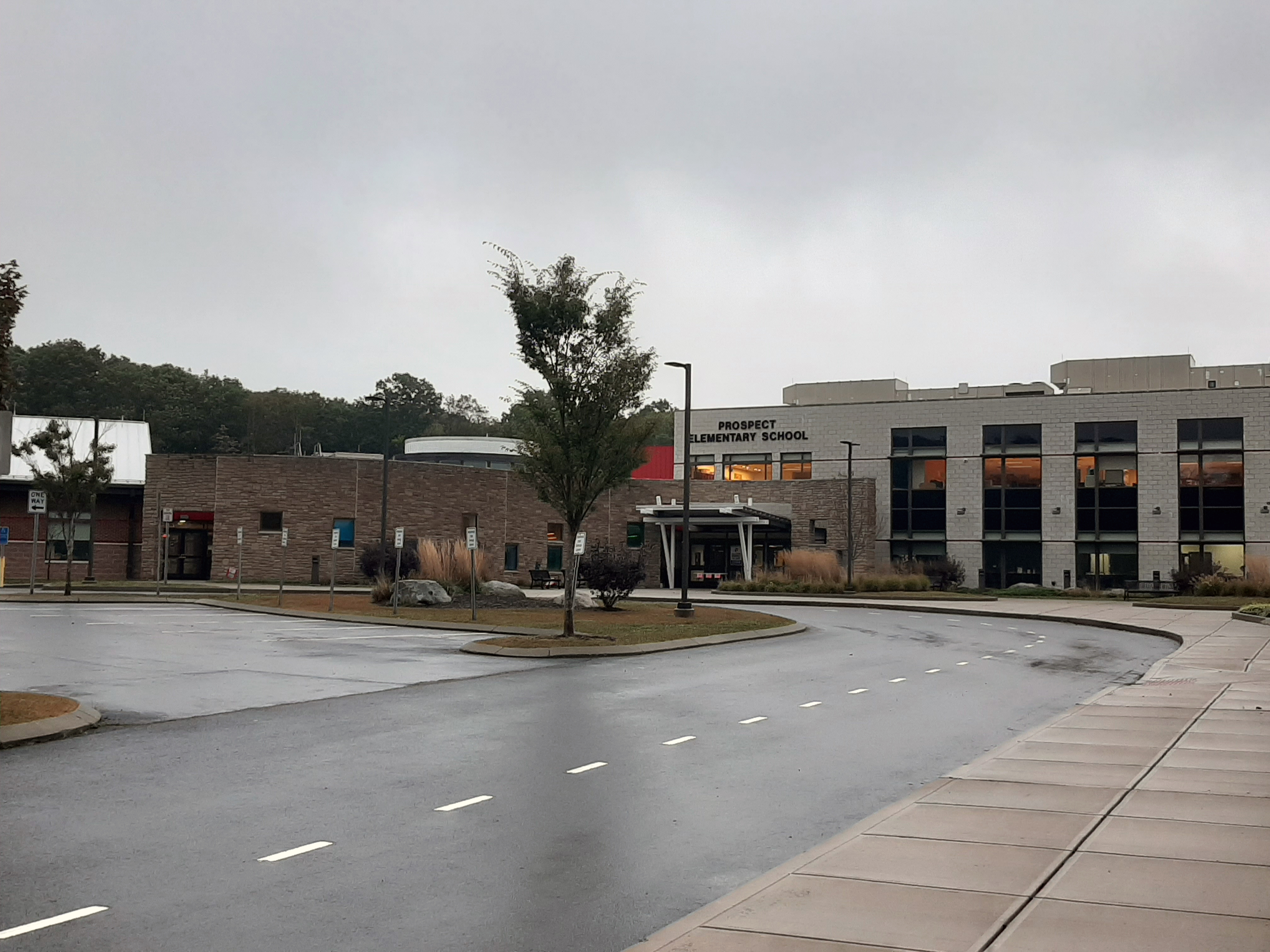
Prospect Elementary School on Route 69

Prior to the construction of Woodland Regional High School, Prospect students attended High School at Wilby High School in Waterbury until 1983. After the contract with Waterbury concluded, Prospect high schoolers had the choice of attending Nonnewaug High School in Woodbury, Wolcott High School in Wolcott, Naugatuck High School in Naugatuck, Connecticut, Masuk High School in Monroe, Connecticut, Seymour High School in Seymour, Connecticut, Emmet O'Brien Technical High School in Ansonia, Connecticut as well as Kaynor Technical High School in Waterbury, Connecticut.

Since 2015, total enrollment in Region 16's school district has been declining, losing 192 students between 2015 and 2019. In early 2020, the Board of Education began to discuss a policy wherein non-resident students from other towns could attend school within the district, which would cost about $15,800 a student in tuition, but as of the February 22, 2020, no further action was taken on the measure.

Funding for Region 16, which today controls and operates four schools, is based on the number of students from each town attending the district. As of 2020, the operating budget for the district was $40.7 million, with the town of Prospect responsible for $20.5 million due to the town's children making up 63.25% of the school district's student population. The town, like Beacon Falls, funds its portion of the region's budget through property taxes.

In 2011, voters approved a $47.5 million bonding package that would fund the construction of Prospect Elementary School, renovate Laurel Ledge Elementary School, and build a new office for Region 16 in Prospect on the former location of Algonquin School on Coer Road. The new Prospect Elementary School (grades K–5) replaced Algonquin School (grades K–3) and Community School (grades 4–5). Students in grades 6–8 in Prospect and Beacon Falls attend Long River Middle School, and students in grades 9–12 attend Woodland Regional High School.

== Infrastructure ==
=== Transportation ===
Prospect is well connected to Connecticut's wider transportation network. Route 68 which provide town residents access to Union City and Cheshire and Route 69 intersect near the town centre, which provide town residents access to New Haven and Waterbury. In close proximity to the Waterbury-Prospect line are entrances to I-84, and close to the Cheshire-Prospect border are entrances to I-691.

There are no bus routes within the town, but Bus Routes 431 and 428 of the Greater Waterbury Bus System have stops located just north of the Waterbury-Prospect on East Mountain off Route 69, and on Scott Road near the intersection with Austin Road.

== Notable people ==
- Robert Chatfield, politician
- Christopher Evans,(1968-2023) French-American graphic designer and illustrator
- John Fusco, screenwriter and producer
- Julius Hotchkiss, politician
- Vincent Ingala, smooth jazz and R&B saxophonist
- Rufus G. Russell (1823–1896), architect
