= Quinnipiac River =

Quinnipiac River Dragon River, East River, New Haven River
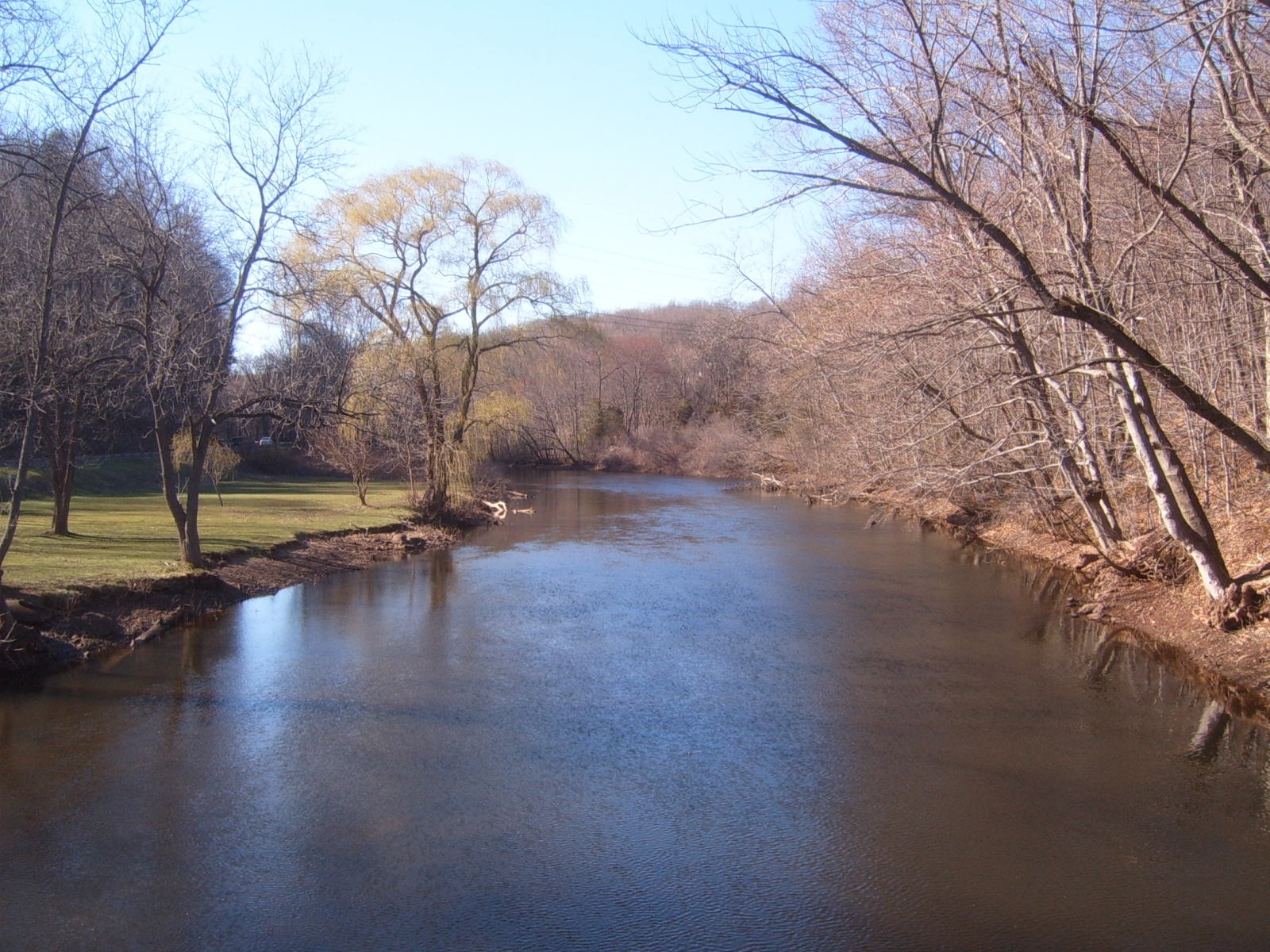
- The Quinnipiac River, as seen looking west (upstream) from "Red Bridge" in Meriden, Connecticut

Location
- Country: United States
- State: Connecticut
- Region: New Haven, Hartford
- District: North Haven, Wallingford, Cheshire, Southington, Plainville
- Cities: New Haven, Meriden

Physical characteristics
- Source: Deadwood Swamp
  - location: Farmington, Connecticut, Hartford County, Connecticut, United States
  - coordinates: 41°41′42″N 072°48′55″W
  - elevation: 335 ft (102 m)
- Mouth: New Haven Harbor, New Haven, Connecticut
  - location: Long Island Sound, New Haven County, Connecticut, United States
  - coordinates: 41°17′58″N 072°54′14″W
  - elevation: 0 ft (0 m)
- Length: 45.5 mi (73.2 km)
- Discharge
  - location: mouth
  - average: 414 cu ft/s (11.7 m^{3}/s) (estimate)

The Quinnipiac River (/ˈkwɪnəˌpi.æk/ KWIH-nə-pee-ak) is a 45.5-mile (73.2 km) long river in the New England region of the United States, located entirely in the state of Connecticut.

The river rises in West Central Connecticut from Dead Wood Swamp near the city of New Britain. It flows roughly southward to Plainville, Southington, and Cheshire, west of the city of Meriden, through Wallingford and Yalesville, North Haven, and flows into New Haven Harbor, an inlet of Long Island Sound, east of downtown New Haven.

== History ==
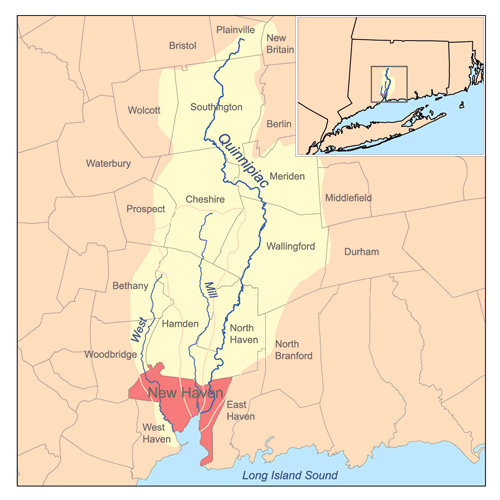
Map showing the Quinnipiac River watershed.

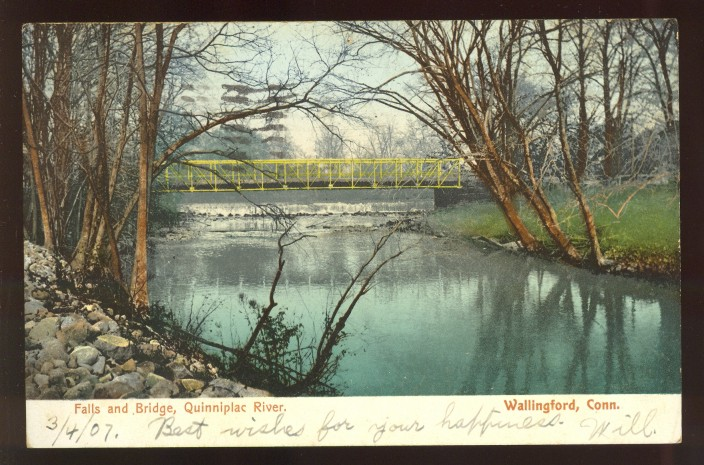
Bridge in Wallingford, 1907

The name "Quinnipiac" comes from an Algonquian phrase meaning "long water land", and historically referred both to the river and the area around its mouth at Long Island Sound. Europeans found the river in 1614. By the early 18th century, early settlers called the Quinnipiac River the Dragon River after the seals, then referred to as “sea dragons,” that were once abundant there. Although these seals were likely harbor seals (Phoca vitulina), archaeological evidence confirms that gray seals (Halichoerus grypus), which are over twice the size of a harbor seal, also lived near the mouth of the Quinnipiac River as recently as the sixteenth century.

== Watershed and course ==
The Quinnipiac River watershed drains an area of approximately 165 square miles (430 km^{2}). There are four dams, most of which are old remnants, that impede boat travel. The first dam is about 1/2 mile south of Plantsville, the second dam is at the southeast corner of Hanover Pond in South Meriden, the third dam is in northeast Yalesville, and the fourth dam is at the south end of Community Lake in Wallingford.

In April 2017, a small hydroelectric plant using a screw turbine was installed at Hanover Pond.

Paddling is a frequent recreational activity along the Quinnipiac River, especially within the tidal marsh in North Haven. Additionally, the tidal variation extends approximately 14 miles (23 km) upriver from its mouth.

== Ecology and conservation ==
Throughout the 19th and 20th centuries, the river suffered from severe pollution problems because of the presence of heavy industry and population centers in its watershed. The Quinnipiac was the subject of the first ever pollution control measure in the state of Connecticut. In 1886, the state legislature passed a measure prohibiting the City of Meriden from discharging raw sewage into the river. In 1891, the act resulted in the building of state's second sewage treatment plant.

Nevertheless, by 1914, the State Board of Health reported that the major fish life had largely disappeared from its mouth. The pollution has been somewhat abated by the passage of the Connecticut Clean Water Act of 1967, and by the Water Pollution Control Act of 1972, which provided the legal authority to take measures to clean up the river's watershed. The measures included the construction of advanced waste management facilities for sewage and industrial waste. Levels of copper in the river have decreased 70% since the 1980s and are now comparable to other reference streams in Connecticut. Combined sewer overflows from the City of New Haven are still regarded as a major problem for the estuary.

== Recreation ==
Paralleling the west bank of the Quinnipiac River through the entire length of Quinnipiac River State Park in North Haven is the Quinnipiac Trail.

== Crossings ==
County	Town	Carrying
Hartford	Plainville	Route 72
Hartford	Plainville	Crooked Street (SSR 536)
Hartford	Plainville	Woodford Avenue (SSR 536)
Hartford	Plainville	Tomlinson Avenue
Hartford	Plainville	Stillwell Drive
Hartford	Plainville	Shuttlemeadow Road
Hartford	Southington	Route 10
Hartford	Southington	Newell Street
Hartford	Southington	West Queen Street
Hartford	Southington	Spring Street
Hartford	Southington	I-84
Hartford	Southington	Lazy Lane
Hartford	Southington	Curtiss Street
Hartford	Southington	Hart Street
Hartford	Southington	Mill Street
Hartford	Southington	Center Street
Hartford	Southington	West Center Street
Hartford	Southington	West Main Street
Hartford	Southington	Atwater Street
Hartford	Southington	Exit 29 ramps
Hartford	Southington	Route 10
Hartford	Southington	Old Turnpike Road
Hartford	Southington	Route 322
New Haven	Cheshire	I-691
New Haven	Cheshire	East Johnson Avenue
New Haven	Cheshire	Blacks Road
New Haven	Cheshire	Cheshire Street
New Haven	Meriden	Oregon Road
New Haven	Meriden	Main Street
New Haven	Wallingford	Oak Street
New Haven	Wallingford	Route 150
New Haven	Wallingford	Route 68
New Haven	Wallingford	Route 15/Wilbur Cross Parkway
New Haven	Wallingford	Route 150
New Haven	Wallingford	Quinnipiac Street
New Haven	Wallingford	Toelles Road
New Haven	North Haven	US 5
New Haven	North Haven	Broadway
New Haven	North Haven	Route 40
New Haven	North Haven	Sackett Point Road
New Haven	New Haven	Middletown Avenue
New Haven	New Haven	I-91
New Haven	New Haven	Grand Avenue
New Haven	New Haven	Ferry Street
New Haven	New Haven	I-95
New Haven	New Haven	US 1

== See also ==
- Grannis Island
- List of rivers of Connecticut
