= Connecticut Route 68 =

East-west state highway in Connecticut, US

Route 68
- Map of central Connecticut with Route 68 highlighted in red

Route information
- Maintained by CTDOT
- Length: 22.09 mi (35.55 km)
- Existed: 1932 (extended 1967)–present

Major junctions
- West end: Route 63 in Naugatuck
- Route 8 in Naugatuck; I-91 in Wallingford
- East end: Route 17 in Durham

Location
- Country: United States
- State: Connecticut
- Counties: New Haven, Middlesex

Highway system
- Connecticut State Highway System; Interstate; US; State; SSR; SR; Scenic
← Route 67	→ Route 69

Route 68 is an east–west state highway in the U.S. state of Connecticut connecting the towns of Durham and Naugatuck.

== Route description ==
Route 68 begins at Route 63 in Naugatuck. After crossing the Naugatuck River, it overpasses the Route 8 expressway, with access via Union Street (SR 723) and North Main Street (SR 710). Route 68 then leaves the Naugatuck River Valley and ascends to Prospect, where it intersects Route 69 in the center of town. It then descends once again into Cheshire, where it joins Route 70 for a 3.1 mile concurrency. In the center of Cheshire, the concurrency becomes a 0.15 mile triplex with Route 10. After the Route 70 concurrency ends, Route 68 becomes a 4 lane road as it enters Wallingford. The road narrows to 2 lanes as it passes through Yalesville where it intersects Route 150. After passing under Route 15 (Wilbur Cross Parkway) and does not have an interchange with it and it meets US 5 at a one-quadrant interchange. Route 68 becomes a 4-lane undivided, partially access controlled road for the next 2.3 miles to its junction with I-91 at Exit 16. After overpassing I-91 and passing a couple of business parks, Route 68 becomes a 2 lane road once again. It then enters Durham, where it passes the southern end of Route 157 before ending at Route 17 in the center of town.

== History ==
The road connecting Naugatuck and Cheshire was designated in 1922 as State Highway 325. In the 1932 state highway renumbering, former Highway 325 was renumbered to Route 68. The route was later extended east to Middlefield in 1966 along former SR 607 (Wallingford to Middlefield) and SR 730 (Cheshire to Wallingford) via an overlap with Route 70. In 1973 and 1974, parts of Route 68 were rerouted in Wallingford.

== Junction list ==
County	Location	mi	km	Destinations	Notes
New Haven	Naugatuck	0.00	0.00	Route 63 – New Haven, Middlebury	Western terminus
New Haven	Naugatuck	0.61	0.98	Route 8 south / North Main Street (SR 710 north) – Bridgeport	Access via SR 723; exit 26 on Route 8 north
New Haven	Prospect	4.28	6.89	Route 69 – Waterbury, New Haven	
New Haven	Cheshire	7.67	12.34	Route 70 west – Waterbury	Western end of Route 70 concurrency
New Haven	Cheshire	9.36	15.06	Route 10 north – Southington	Western end of Route 10 concurrency
New Haven	Cheshire	9.51	15.30	Route 10 south – Hamden, New Haven	Eastern end of Route 10 concurrency
New Haven	Cheshire	10.76	17.32	Route 70 east – Meriden	Eastern end of Route 70 concurrency
New Haven	Wallingford	14.00	22.53	Route 150 – Meriden, Wallingford Center	
New Haven	Wallingford	14.61	23.51	US 5 – Meriden, New Haven	One-quadrant interchange
New Haven	Wallingford	16.83	27.09	I-91 – New Haven, Hartford	Exit 16 on I-91
Middlesex	Durham	19.51	31.40	Route 157 north – Middlefield	Southern terminus of Route 157
Middlesex	Durham	22.09	35.55	Route 17 – Middletown, Madison, New Haven	Eastern terminus
1.000 mi = 1.609 km; 1.000 km = 0.621 mi: Concurrency terminus
