= Milldale (Southington) =

Coordinates: 41°33′57″N 72°53′31″W

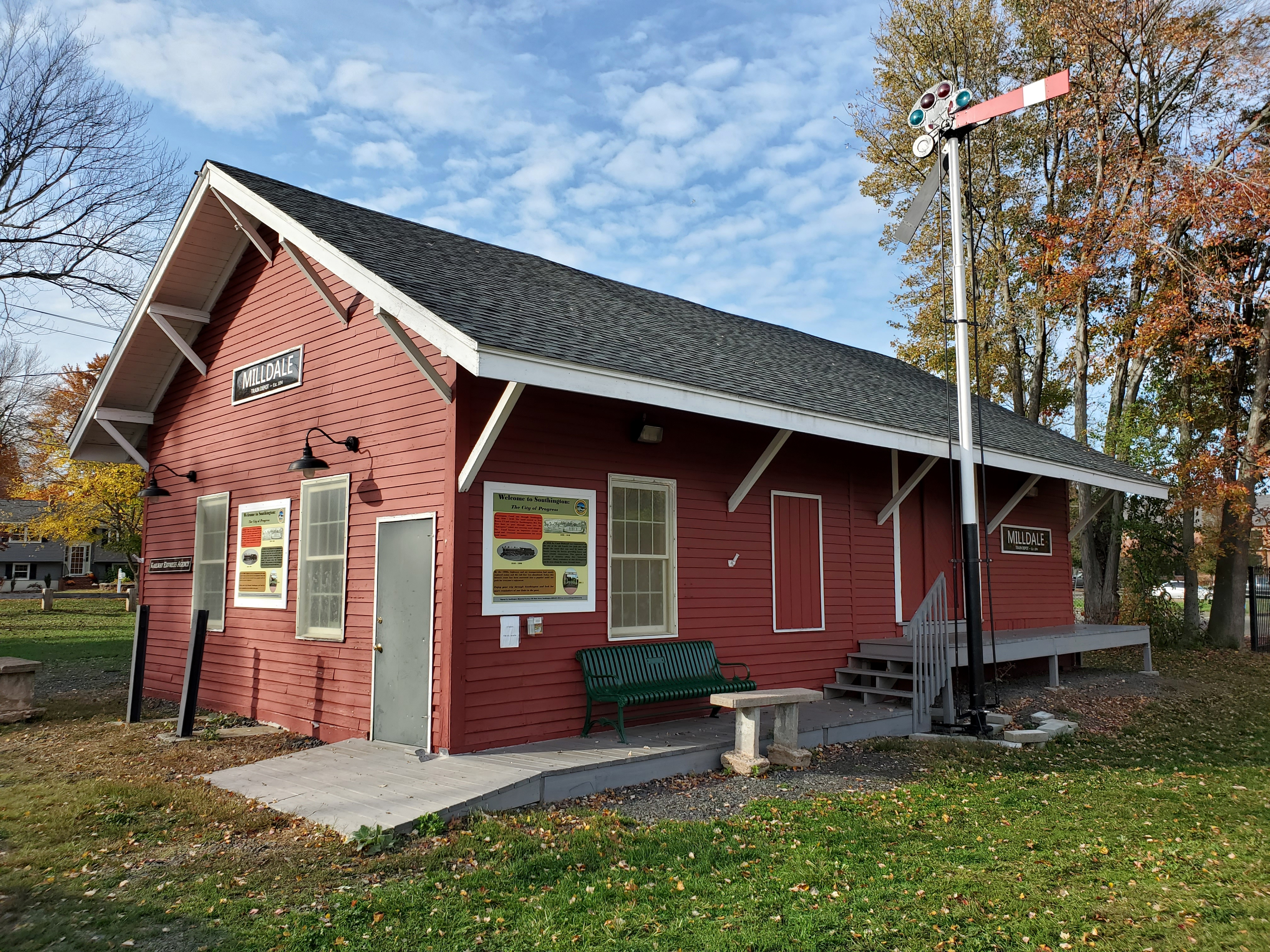
The former Milldale station of the Canal Line

Milldale is a neighborhood in the incorporated town of Southington, Hartford County, Connecticut, United States.
