= Plantsville, Connecticut =

Census-designated place in Connecticut, United States

- Plantsville Historic District
- U.S. National Register of Historic Places
- U.S. Historic district
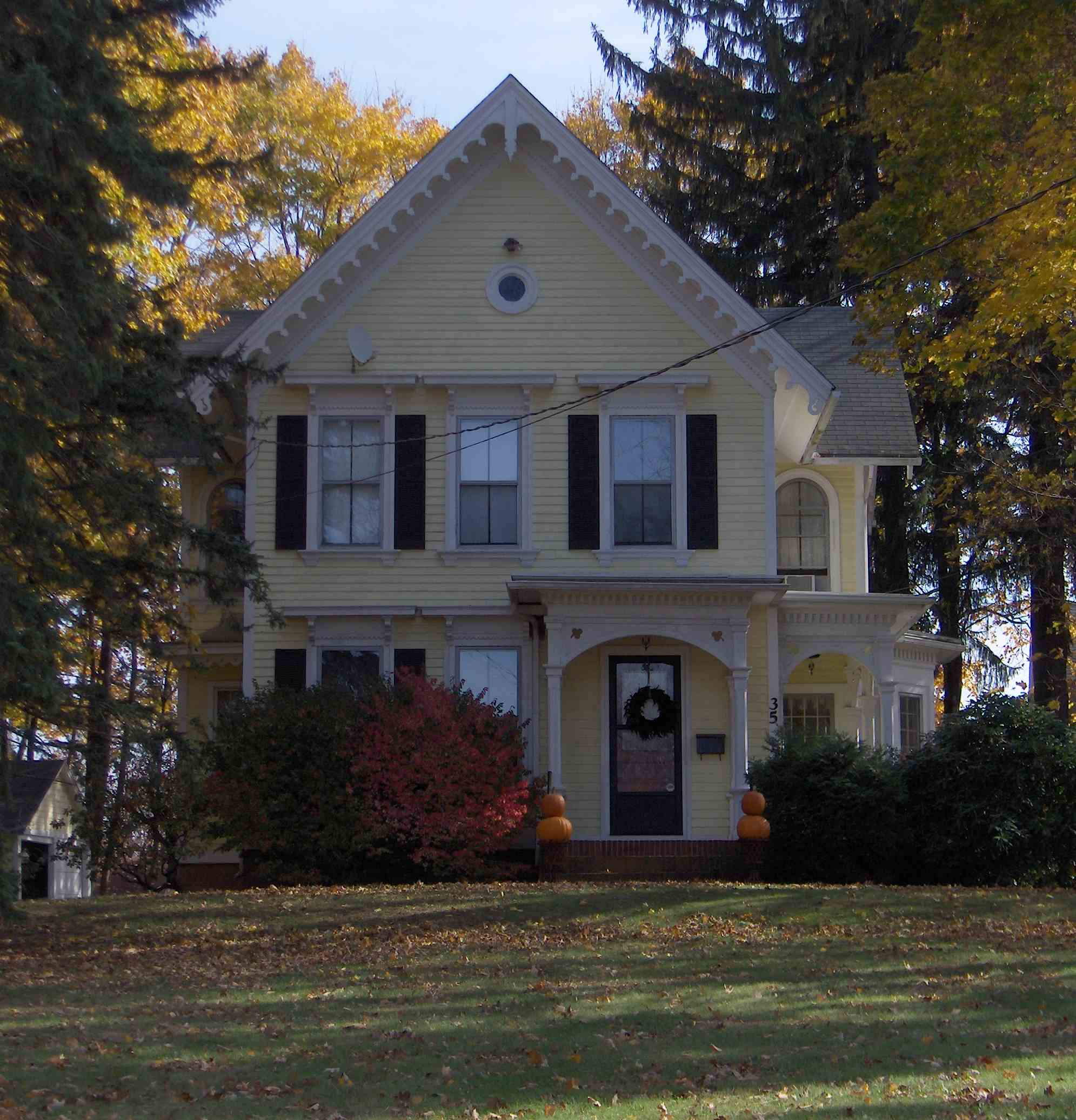
- Charles Cowles House

- Location within Connecticut Location within the United States
- Location: Roughly bounded by Prospect Street, Summer Street, Quinnipiac River, Grove Street, South Main Street, West Main Street, and West Street, Southington, Connecticut
- Coordinates: 41°35′26″N 72°53′35″W
- Architect: Cady, Josiah Cleveland
- Architectural style: Greek Revival, Italianate, Queen Anne
- NRHP reference No.: 88002673
- Added to NRHP: December 1, 1988

Plantsville is a neighborhood in the town of Southington, Hartford County, Connecticut, United States. It is centered at the merger between South Main Street (road from the Milldale section) and West Main Street (road from the Marion section). As of the 2020 census, Plantsville had a population of 2,016. The Zip Code Tabulation Area for zip code 06479, which is assigned the postal city name Plantsville, includes the entire southwestern corner of the town of Southington, including Marion and Milldale. Beginning in 2015 Plantsville (not including Marion and Milldale) was listed as a census-designated place.

== Geography ==
Plantsville is located in the south-central part of Southington at geographical coordinates 41° 34′ 56" North, 72° 53′ 25" West (41.5824, -72.8904). It is just south of the town center of Southington. The CDP border follows Prospect Street and Carter Lane on the north side, Old Turnpike Road on the east, Mulberry Street on the south, and Atwater Street and Interstate 84 on the west. Route 10 (Main Street) passes through the center of Plantsville, leading north to the center of Southington and south to Cheshire.

The Quinnipiac River flows through the community, just west of Route 10.

== 1962 Tornado ==
On May 24, 1962, the neighborhood was partially flattened by a high-end F3 tornado. The tornado, which was "near-F4" intensity at the time, damaged or destroyed numerous buildings, homes, businesses, and vehicles throughout the area. Overall, the storm left one dead and 50 injured.

== Demographics ==
=== 2020 census ===
As of the 2020 census, Plantsville had a population of 2,016. The median age was 45.7 years. 18.7% of residents were under the age of 18 and 19.4% of residents were 65 years of age or older. For every 100 females there were 76.1 males, and for every 100 females age 18 and over there were 75.2 males age 18 and over.

100.0% of residents lived in urban areas, while 0.0% lived in rural areas.

There were 917 households in Plantsville, of which 25.1% had children under the age of 18 living in them. Of all households, 40.5% were married-couple households, 18.5% were households with a male householder and no spouse or partner present, and 33.6% were households with a female householder and no spouse or partner present. About 36.7% of all households were made up of individuals and 18.0% had someone living alone who was 65 years of age or older.

There were 971 housing units, of which 5.6% were vacant. The homeowner vacancy rate was 2.0% and the rental vacancy rate was 4.9%.

Racial composition as of the 2020 census
| Race | Number | Percent |
|---|---|---|
| White | 1,752 | 86.9% |
| Black or African American | 36 | 1.8% |
| American Indian and Alaska Native | 5 | 0.2% |
| Asian | 61 | 3.0% |
| Native Hawaiian and Other Pacific Islander | 1 | 0.0% |
| Some other race | 23 | 1.1% |
| Two or more races | 138 | 6.8% |
| Hispanic or Latino (of any race) | 129 | 6.4% |

=== 2000 census ===
At the time of the 2000 Census, there were a total of 10,387 people living within the Plantsville Zip Code Tabulation Area. The median age was 38.3.

=== Demographic estimates ===
According to the 2020–2024 American Community Survey 5-year estimates, the median value of owner-occupied housing units in the Plantsville census-designated place was $296,400.

== Attractions ==
The Plantsville Historic District is a historic district that was listed on the National Register of Historic Places in 1988. The district was recognized for its diversity of 19th and early 20th-century residential and industrial architecture, encompassing a century's development of the community as an industrial village. Notable buildings include the 1866 Plantsville Congregational Church, one of the state's finest examples of Gothic Revival architecture, designed by Josiah Cleveland Cady.

=== Education ===
There are three schools located in Plantsville: Plantsville School, Strong Elementary School, and John F. Kennedy Middle School.

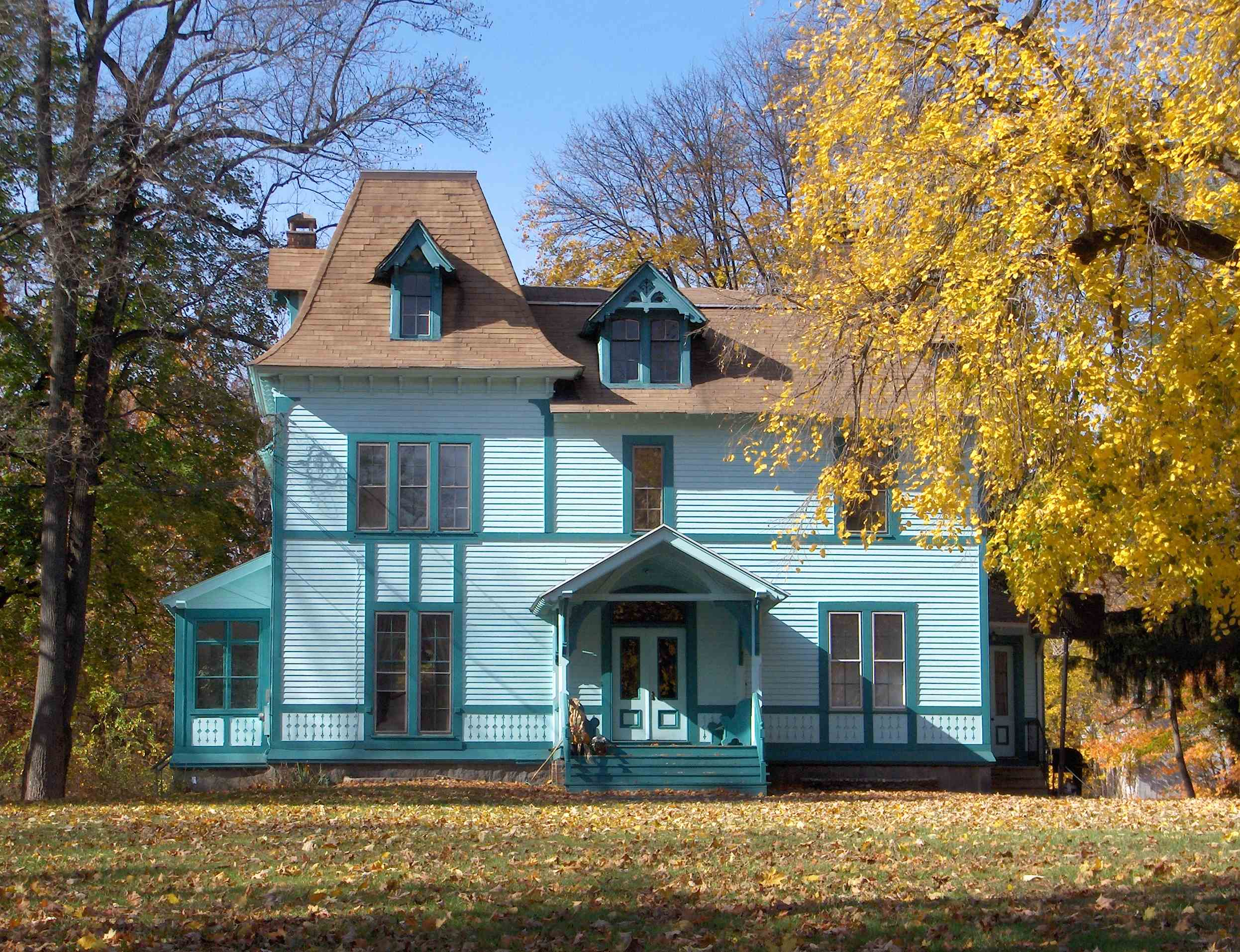
Twichell/Ward House

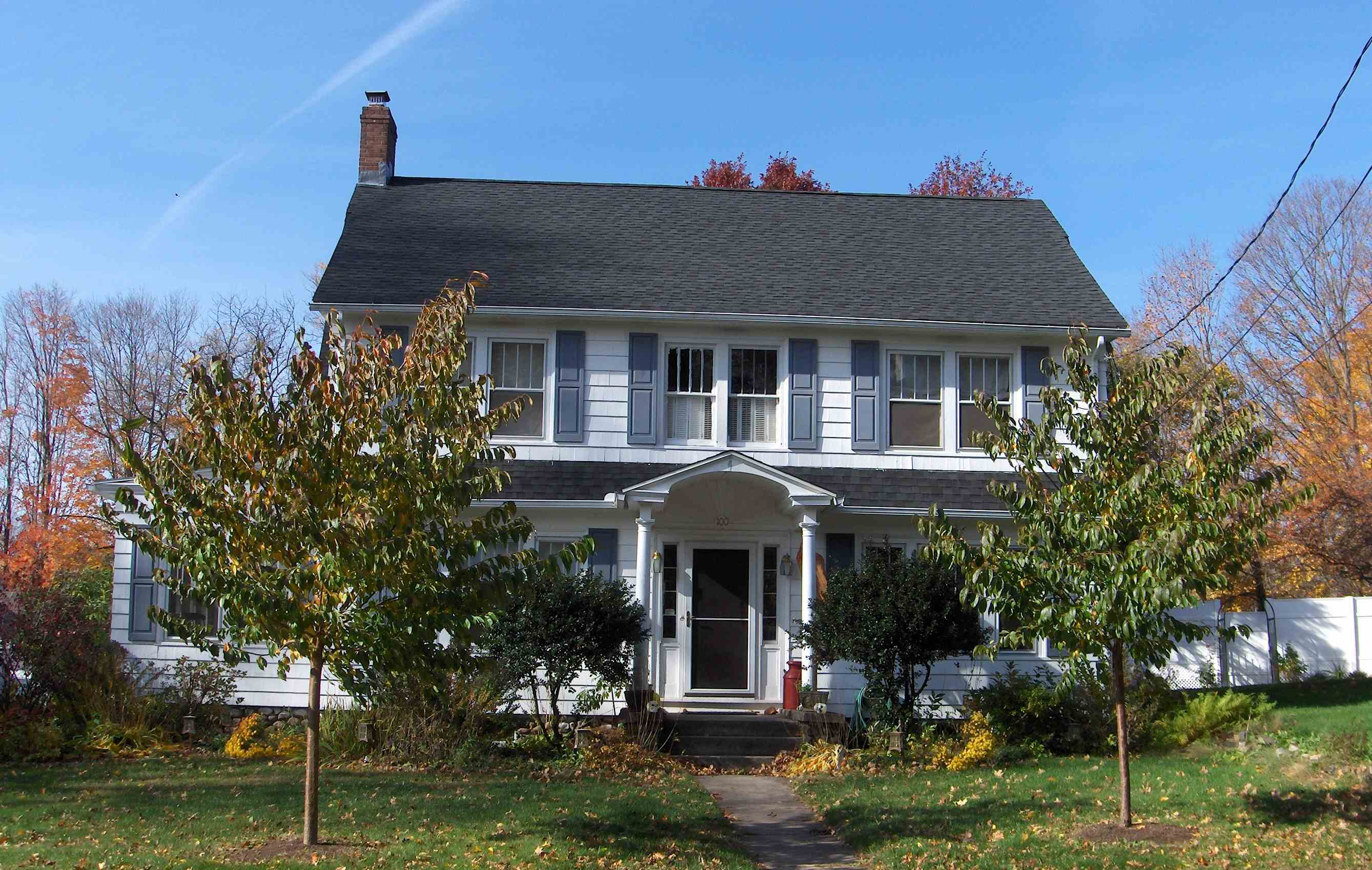
100 Church Street

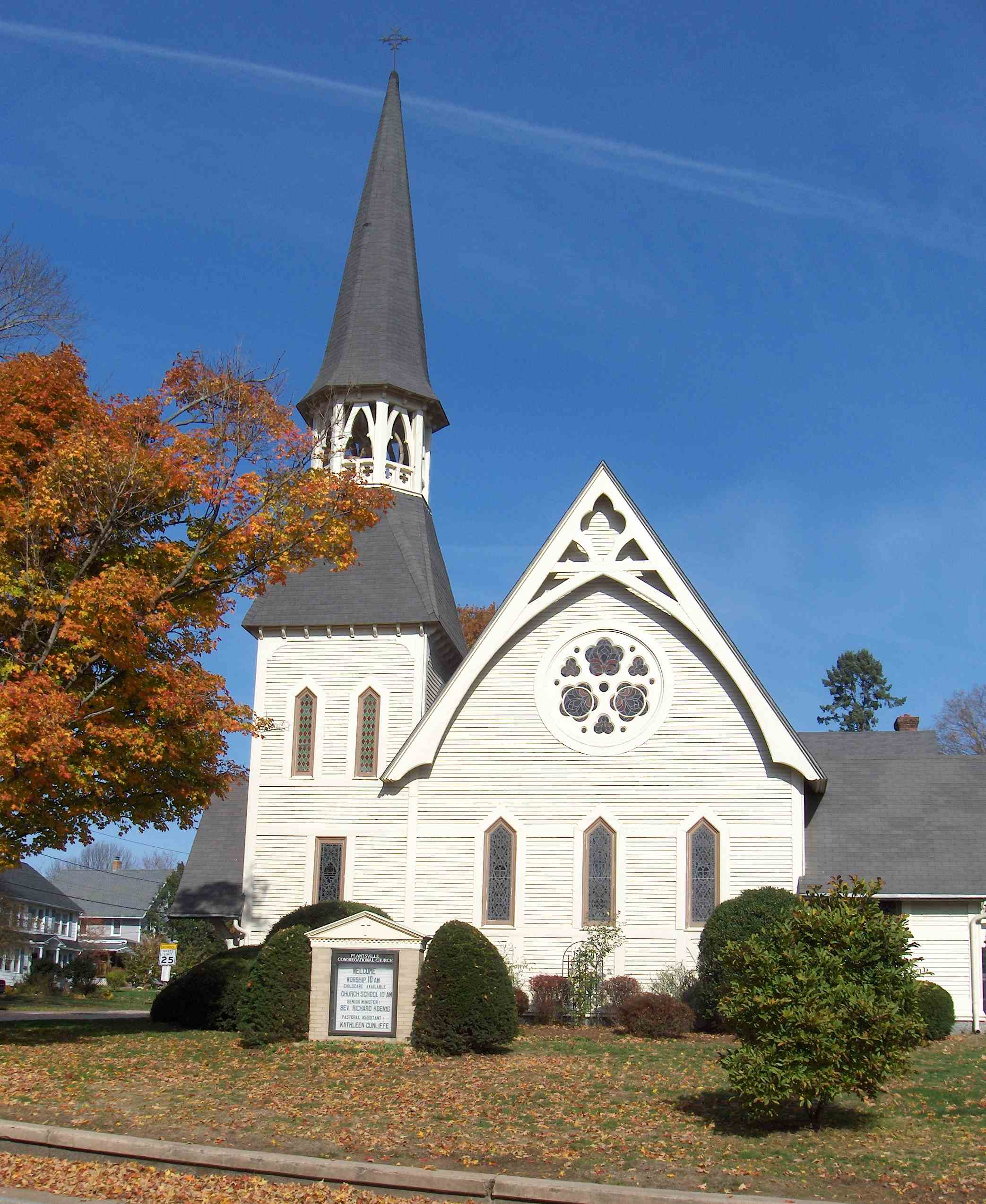
Congregational Church

== See also ==
- National Register of Historic Places listings in Southington, Connecticut
