= Catholic Memorial School =

Private, all-boys school in West Roxbury, MA, United States

Catholic Memorial

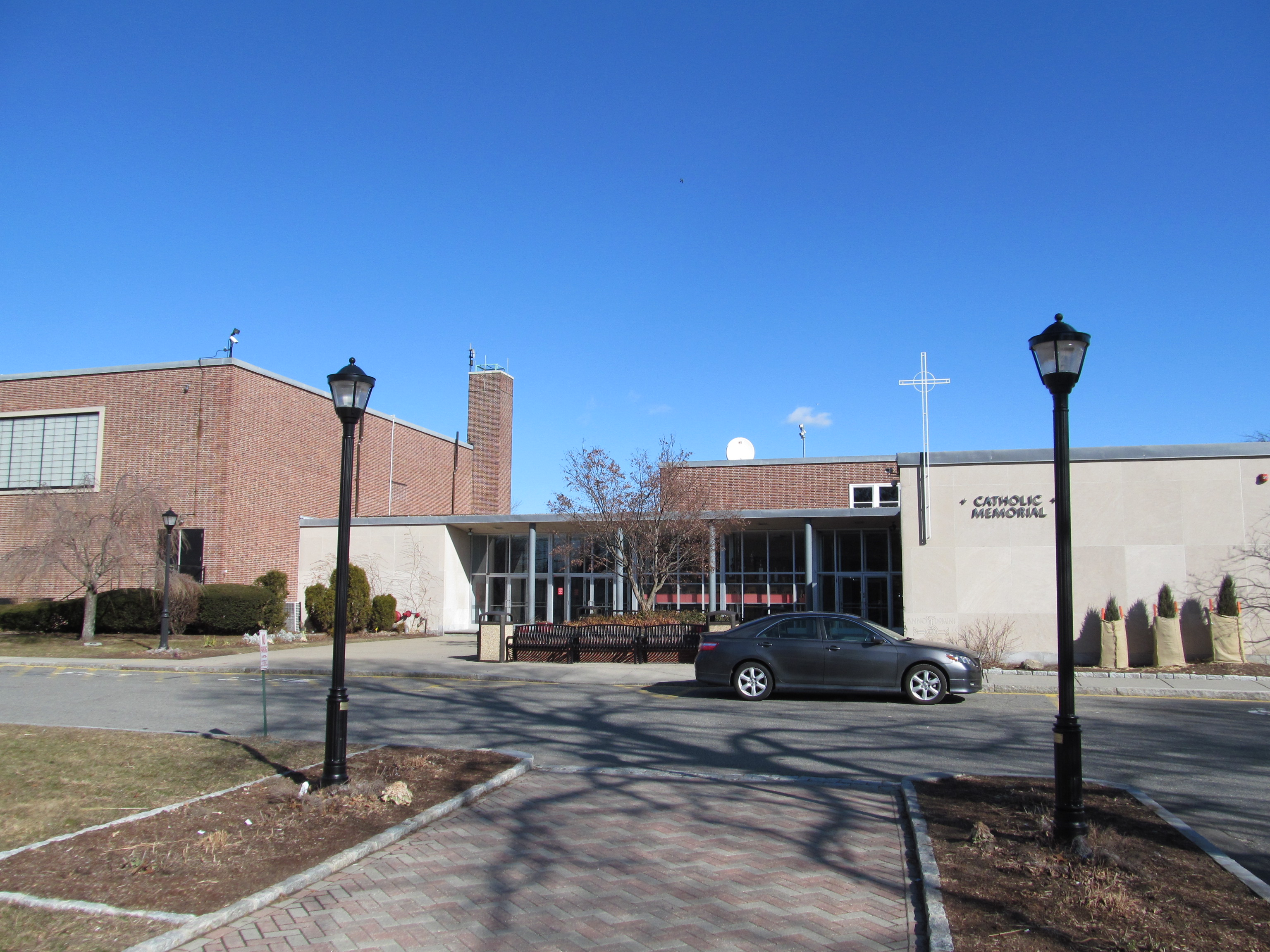

Location
- 235 Baker Street; West Roxbury, (Suffolk County), MA 02132; United States; 42°16′39″N 71°9′58″W

Information
- Type: Private, all-boys
- Motto: Vince in Bono Malum (Conquer evil by doing good)
- Religious affiliations: Roman Catholic, Congregation of Christian Brothers
- Established: September 9, 1957; 69 years ago
- Founder: Joseph G. McKenna
- President: Adam Lewis
- Principal: Kevin Durazo
- Grades: 7-12
- Enrollment: 621 (2024–2025)
- Student to teacher ratio: 12:1
- Campus size: 12 acres (49,000 m^{2})
- Colors: Red & silver
- Athletics: MIAA - Division 1
- Athletics conference: Catholic Conference - District B
- Nickname: CM
- Team name: Knights
- Rival: Boston College High, Malden Catholic, Xaverian, St. Johns Prep
- Accreditation: New England Association of Schools and Colleges
- Publication: CM Magazine
- Newspaper: Knight Insight
- Yearbook: Talisman
- Tuition: $29,700 (2025–2026)
- Alumni: 10,000+
- Website: www.catholicmemorial.org

Catholic Memorial (CM) is an all-boys college preparatory school (grades 7–12) located in West Roxbury, Boston, Massachusetts, United States. It is part of the Roman Catholic Archdiocese of Boston and is administered by the Congregation of Christian Brothers.

== History ==
The Christian Brothers of Ireland first came to St. John's, Newfoundland in 1876, then Harlem, New York in 1906, before reaching the West Roxbury in 1957.

Catholic Memorial High School, as it was called then, opened its doors on September 9, 1957, with 225 students and five Christian Brothers: founding headmaster Br. Joseph G. McKenna, C.F.C. and Brothers Spencer Philip Considine, Aton Joseph Lips, Thomas Francis Feerick and Thomas Stephen Patterson. The school was named "Catholic Memorial" at the suggestion of Cardinal Cushing, to commemorate the sesquicentennial of the Archdiocese of Boston and as a memorial to Catholic donors.

Monsignor Charles A. Donahue, V.F., LL.D., pastor of St. Theresa of Avila Parish, played a role in bringing the Christian Brothers to Boston, and donated the former St. Theresa Parish School building (now Donahue Hall) to serve as Catholic Memorial's campus. Br. McKenna later opened a new school building at 235 Baker Street, which was dedicated by Cardinal Cushing on November 10, 1959. Three years later a new classroom wing was opened and enrollment increased to 1110 students.

In 1971 there were 22 Christian Brothers, but in 2016, only three.

The middle school prgram, envisioned by Br. John Sheehan, C.F.C., opened in September 1993 with 185 students in grades 7 and 8.

In 2016, CM opened the John Walsh '61 Field House. In 2021, the school opened the $11 million Yawkey Center for Integrated and Applied Learning (CIAL), enabled by a $2.5 million naming gift from the Yawkey Foundations.

== Academics ==
=== Curriculum ===
CM is a college-preparatory institution. The school offered 18 Advanced Placement courses in 2023. The school's World Languages department offers instruction in Latin, Spanish, Italian, and Irish.

CM is one of the only schools that teaches the Irish language outside of the European Union, through its Irish Studies Program. The school has hosted an Irish Minister of State and the Irish Consul as visitors.

In 2017, the school introduced "Knight Based Learning" as CM’s own version of project-based interdisciplinary curriculum model.

CM hosts a hydroponic farm built inside a shipping container ("Freight Farm") on its campus to support its STEM and sustainability curriculum.

=== Admissions ===
Tuition for the 2025-26 school year was $29,700. Scholarships are awarded upon admission to students in CM's middle school and high school programs. The admissions committee selects students for scholarship eligibility based upon their past academic performance and extrance exam results . Financial aid is available for qualifying families, with over $1 million in aid provided annually.

== School life ==
=== Athletics ===
Catholic Memorial is a member of the Massachusetts Athletic Association's (MIAA) Catholic Conference. The school fields over 40 teams across 15 sports, including cross country, football, golf, soccer in the fall; basketball, hockey, indoor track and field, swimming, and wrestling in the winter; and baseball, lacrosse, outdoor track and field, rugby, tennis, and volleyball in the spring.

CM athletes have won over 130 conference championships, 50 team state championships, and 69 individual team state championships. 17 CM students have earned All-American honors. The school's hockey program has won six national championships. The school's 1969 basketball team recorded the only 29–0 season ever by a Massachusetts high-school basketball team, according to the Boston Globe.

The school also runs the CM Invitational, New England's oldest cross country invitational meet.

=== Speech and Debate ===
CM teaches public speaking throughout its curriculum, and runs a high-performing "forensics" (speech and debate) program that competes in Massachusetts and nationwide. Nearly every student participates in forensics at one point in his academic career. Since 1961, the program has produced over 25 state and three national champions. The team won the Massachusetts Speech and Debate League State Speech and Congressional Debate Tournament nine times, in 2017, 2018, 2020, 2021, 2022, 2023, 2024, 2025, and 2026, taking second place in the state in 2019. The team won the NSDA "Founder's Award" in 2010, and joined the NSDA 100 Club in 2018.

=== Community service ===
CM's mission includes the mandate to teach young men to "lead through service". Every student must meet annual service obligations, and seniors must design and complete a 60-hour service capstone project. CM also runs the Blessed Edmund Rice Solidarity Initiative (BERSI), which sends students on service-based travel experiences in the United States and internationally. Past locations have included Texas, Wyoming, the Dominican Republic, El Salvador, Peru, Jamaica, South Korea, and China.

CM has regularly conducted funerals for veterans who died without known family or friends since 2017. The practice has been profiled by America magazine and ESPN SportsCenter.

=== CMTV ===
Catholic Memorial Television (CMTV) is the school's broadcast journalist program, broadcasting to homerooms every morning. CMTV delivers the Pledge of Allegiance and morning prayer, school news reporting, and creative programming.

=== Arts, writing, and theatre ===
Students produce several publications including the Errant literary and arts magazine, Knight Insight newspaper, and Talisman yearbook, while the Writing Club offers "open mics" and a poetry slam.

CM's music program dates to the school’s founding in 1957, with the Glee Club established as the school's first extracurricular activity. The school's early Music Director was Dr. Berj Zamkochian, an internationally known organist and musician who later performed for popes and U.S. presidents. During Zamkochian's tenure, the Glee Club appeared at Symphony Hall and produced a recorded album. Musical performance groups today include the Baker Street Boys acapella group, Liturgical Choir, and Honors Band.

The Catholic Memorial Theater Program, known in the 1960s as the Genesians and later as the Catholic Memorial Players and Drama Club, puts on two shows a year. In the past, one annual play in autumn was performed, but the Club later added a spring musical.

Fall plays have included Arsenic and Old Lace (1960), You Can't Take It with You (1964), When Men Reduce as Women Do (1965), Julius Caesar (1966), The Caine Mutiny Court-Martial (1968), The Mouse That Roared (1970), Inherit the Wind (1993), On Borrowed Time (2006), Twelve Angry Men (2007), A Man for All Seasons (2008), The Guys (2010), It's a Wonderful Life (2013), Sherlock Holmes (2014), Twentieth Century (2015), Hamlet (2016), Cyrano de Bergerac (2017), You Can't Take It with You (2018), And Then There Were None (2019), 45 Plays for 45 Presidents (2020), Witness for the Prosecution (2021), The Odd Couple (2022), Macbeth (2023), Arsenic and Old Lace (2024), and The Outsiders (2025).

Spring musicals have includedGrease (1984), Count Dracula (1993), Peter Pan (1999), Chess (2006), Joseph and the Amazing Technicolor Dreamcoat (2007), Guys and Dolls (2008), How to Succeed in Business Without Really Trying (2009), Les Misérables (2010), Grease (2011), Damn Yankees (2012), Me and My Girl (2013), Shrek The Musical (2014), Catch Me If You Can (2015), Bye Bye Birdie (2016), The Addams Family (2017), Phantom (2018), Oliver (2019), Little Shop of Horrors (2020), Camelot (2021), Guys and Dolls (2022), The Pirates of Penzance (2023), Joseph and the Amazing Technicolor Dreamcoat (2024),The Music Man (2025), and School of Rock (2026).

=== Clubs and honor societies ===
CM's Model United Nations program competes in day and college conferences, and runs the biggest fall day conference in the Boston area with up to 300 student participants from over a dozen schools.

The Robotics Club, founded in 2023, competes in the NE FIRST Robotics Program.

CM's Junior Classical League, or Latin Club, is always represented at the Massachusetts State Convention, where many CM students win prizes.

CM hosts chapters of the National Honor Society, Rho Kappa National Social Studies Honor Society, Linguae Latinae Societas Honoris (Latin), Société Honoraire de Français (French), and Sociedad Honoraria Hispánica (Spanish).

== Traditions ==
The CM fight song is sung at athletic events and other major school gatherings. It was authored and composed by Berj Zamkochian. Its lyrics are as follows:

Stand up and cheer for CM
Give out a shout let's go men
We've had to fight to win before
That's not enough, let's fight some more
Silver and red, we hail thee
To thee we look for victory
Get up and go, knights
Conquer the foe, knights
Onward to victory

CM also uses Chris Rice's "Go Light Your World" during all-school masses as a community anthem.

Olympic Day is one of CM's longest-running traditions, and is commonly held at other Edmund Rice Christian Brothers schools in the US. Near the beginning of the school year, students are divided into mixed-grade teams representing different countries for a day of athletic competitions.

Another prominent tradition is the annual Thanksgiving Day football game against Boston College High School. The rivalry dates to 1962, with the schools competing for the Pumpkin Trophy.

== Controversies ==
=== Antisemitism ===
Catholic Memorial made headlines in 2016 when students chanted anti-semitic expressions at a basketball game against Newton North High School. Catholic Memorial students at the game chanted "You killed Jesus." In response to the incident, Newton superintendent David Fleishman contacted the Anti-Defamation League, feeling that "they have a lot of work to do at Catholic Memorial." The Archdiocese of Boston called the situation "unacceptable." In a subsequent statement, Catholic Memorial indicated that they were "deeply disturbed by the behavior of a group of student spectators who made an unacceptable chant." Catholic Memorial ultimately made long-term revisions to their curriculum that would mitigate any recurrence of such an incident of antisemitism.

== Leadership and faculty ==
=== List of Heads of School ===
Tenure	Name
1957–1963	Brother Joseph G. McKenna, C.F.C.
1989–1993	Brother Edward John Sheehan, C.F.C.
1999–2008	Brother James MacDonald, C.F.C.
2008–2014	Paul E. Sheff '62
2014–2025	Dr. Peter Folan
2025–present	Adam Lewis

=== Notable faculty ===
- Dr. Berj Zamkochian
- Ian Moran
- Ron Perry – professional basketball and baseball player, CM coach (1959–1972)
- Michael F. Rush '92

== Notable alumni ==
=== Public service ===
- Daniel F. Conley – Suffolk County District Attorney
- Robert Consalvo – Boston City Councilor
- Brian J. Donnelly – U.S. Congressman and Ambassador
- Michael J. McCormack – Boston City Councilor
- John H. Rogers – Massachusetts State Representative, Majority Leader
- Michael F. Rush – Massachusetts State Senator, former CM teacher
- John Tobin – Boston City Councilor, Vice President at Northeastern University

=== Arts and writing ===
- William Martin – author
- Mike McColgan – singer, Dropkick Murphys, Street Dogs
- Joey McIntyre – singer, New Kids on the Block

=== Athletics ===
- Jim Carey – professional ice hockey player
- Ted Donato – professional ice hockey player and coach
- Allen Doyle – professional golfer
- Jim Fahey – professional ice hockey player
- Kellan Grady – professional basketball player
- Guerby Lambert – college football player
- Skip Lockwood – professional baseball player
- Mark MacDonald – professional football player
- John Marino – professional hockey player
- Devon Marshall – professional football player
- Chris Nilan – professional ice hockey player
- Chris O'Sullivan – professional ice hockey player
- Jack Parker – college ice hockey coach
- Paul Stanton – professional ice hockey player and coach
- Boubacar Traore – college football player
- Brennan Williams – professional wrestler known as ma.çé and former college football player
