= West Roxbury station =

West Roxbury
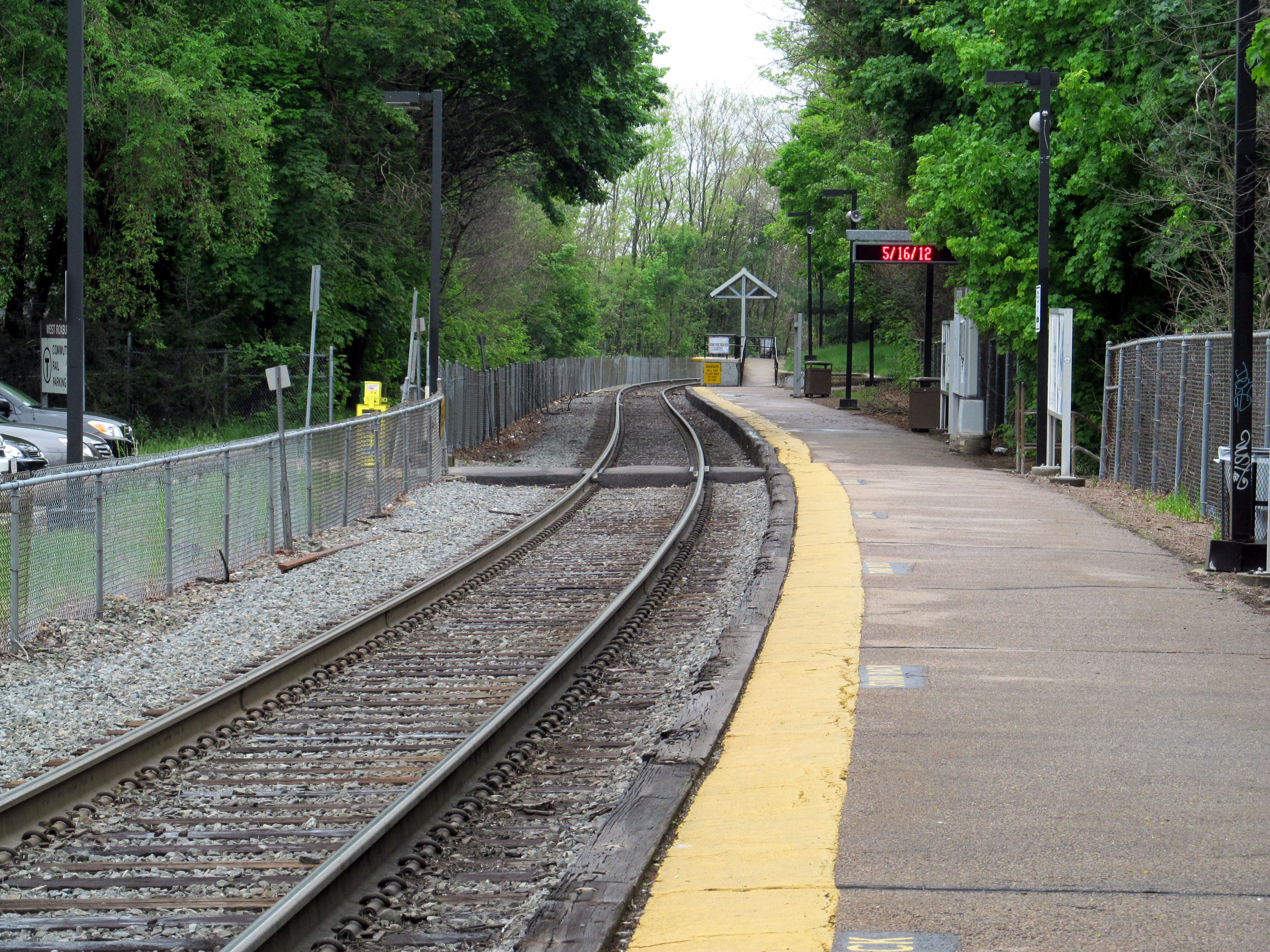
- West Roxbury station in 2012

General information
- Location: 450 Lagrange Street; West Roxbury, Boston, Massachusetts
- Coordinates: 42.2816°N 71.159932°W
- Line: Needham Branch (West Roxbury Branch)
- Platforms: 1 side platform
- Tracks: 1
- Connections: MBTA bus: 35, 36, 37

Construction
- Parking: 175 spaces
- Accessible: Yes

Other information
- Fare zone: 1

History
- Opened: July 14, 1849
- Rebuilt: 1979–1987

Passengers
- 2024: 356 daily boardings

Services
Preceding station	MBTA	Following station
Hersey toward Needham Heights	Needham Line	Highland toward South Station
Former services
Preceding station	MBTA	Following station
Bird's Hill toward Millis	Millis Branch Closed 1967	Highland toward South Station
Preceding station	New York, New Haven and Hartford Railroad	Following station
Bird's Hill toward Woonsocket	Charles River Line	Highland toward Boston
Location

West Roxbury station is an MBTA Commuter Rail station in Boston, Massachusetts, served by the Needham Line. It is located on an embankment above Lagrange Street in the West Roxbury neighborhood. The station is accessible with a short mini-high platform on the outbound end of the main platform.

== History ==
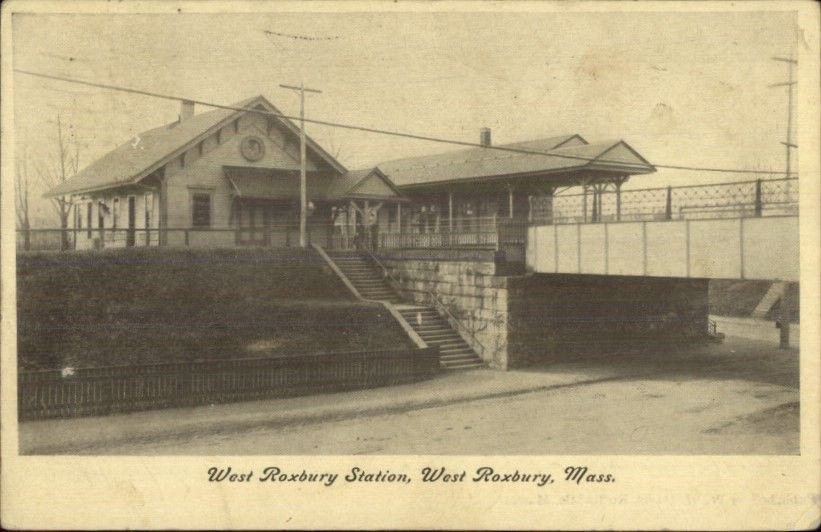
West Roxbury station shown on an early-20th-century postcard

The Boston and Providence Railroad (B&P) opened the West Roxbury Branch from Forest Hills to Dedham (where it connected with the B&P's preexisting branch to Dedham via Readville) via West Roxbury on July 14, 1849. South Street (Roslindale), Central (Bellevue), West Roxbury, and Spring Street stations all opened with the branch. The New Haven Railroad, successor to the B&P, opened the Needham cutoff on November 4, 1906 from West Roxbury to Needham Junction, allowing trains from the former New York and New England Railroad to reach Boston without needing to use the Boston and Albany Railroad's Highland branch. Service to Dedham via West Roxbury ended in 1940, leaving West Roxbury an intermediate station on the commuter lines to Needham and West Medway.

The entire Needham line was closed from 1979 to 1987 while the Southwest Corridor was reconstructed. During that time, most of the stations (including West Roxbury) were renovated for accessibility.
