= Bellevue Hill =

Bellevue Hill may refer to several places:

- Bellevue Hill, New South Wales
- Bellevue Hill, Boston, the highest point in the city of Boston
