= West Roxbury =

Neighborhood of Boston, Massachusetts

Coordinates: 42°16′45″N 71°08′58″W

- Neighborhood of Boston
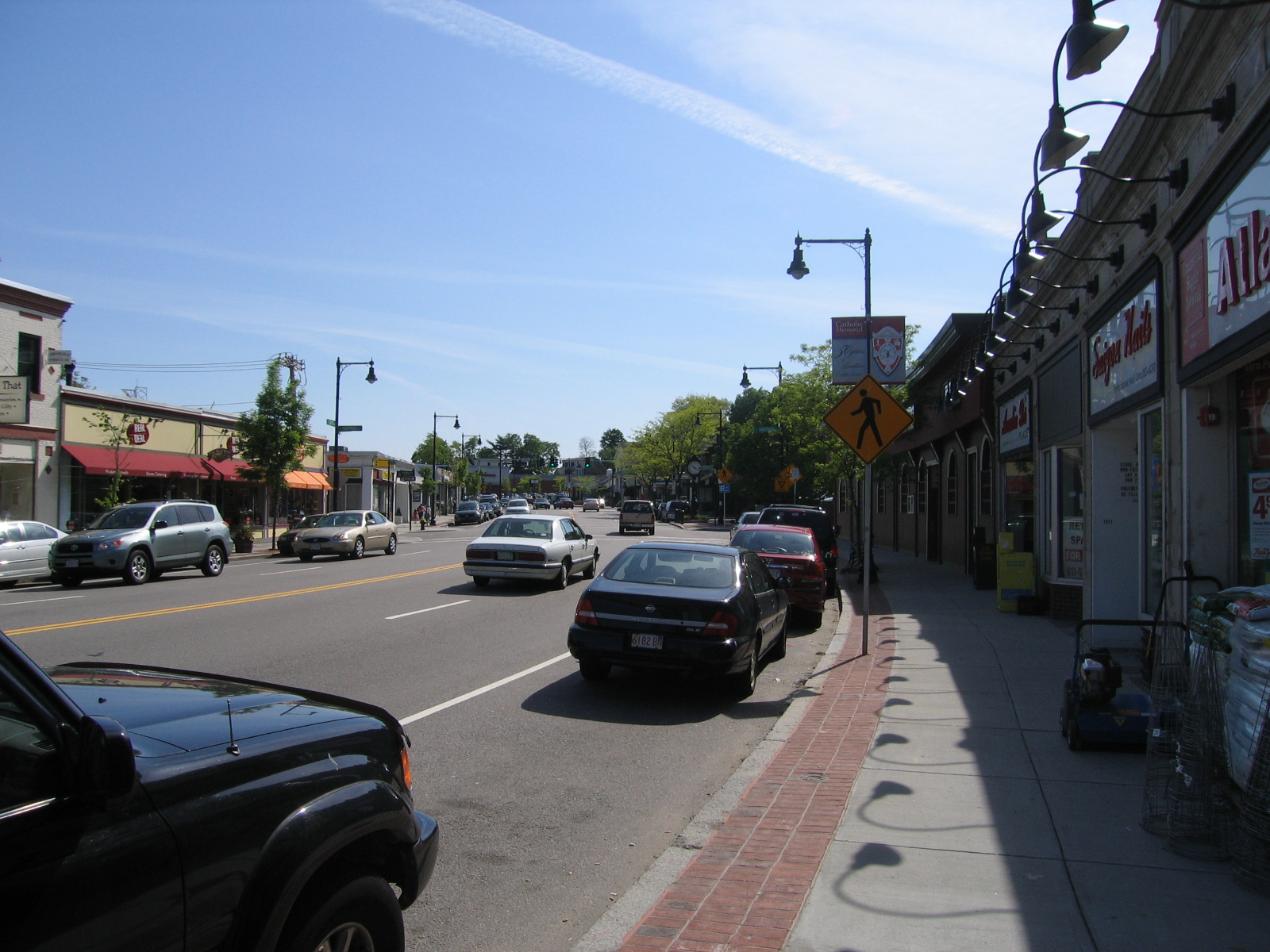
- Centre Street in West Roxbury

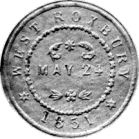
- Seal

- West Roxbury is a neighborhood located in the southwest corner of the city of Boston.
- Country: United States
- State: Massachusetts
- County: Suffolk
- City: Boston
- Settled: 1630
- Founded: 1851

Area
  - Total: 4.61 sq mi (11.9 km^{2})
  - Land: 4.56 sq mi (11.8 km^{2})
  - Water: 0.05 sq mi (0.13 km^{2})

Population (2010)
  - Total: 30,446
  - Density: 6,676.8/sq mi (2,577.9/km^{2})
- Time zone: UTC-5 (Eastern)
- Zip Code: 02132
- Area code: 617 / 857

West Roxbury is a neighborhood in Boston, Massachusetts, United States, bordered by Roslindale and Jamaica Plain to the northeast, the village of Chestnut Hill and the town of Brookline to the north, the city of Newton to the northwest, the towns of Dedham and Needham to the southwest, and Hyde Park to the southeast. It is separated from Roxbury by Roslindale and Jamaica Plain.

== History ==
Before 1630, the area was inhabited by the Wampanoag Indian Tribe.

Founded in 1630 (contemporaneously with Boston), West Roxbury was originally part of the town of Roxbury and was mainly used as farmland. West Roxbury seceded from Roxbury in 1851, and it was annexed by Boston in 1874. The town included the neighborhoods of Jamaica Plain and Roslindale.

West Roxbury's main commercial thoroughfare is Centre Street. West Roxbury Main Streets is a local non-profit that works to enhance and promote the business district. The neighborhood has some two-family houses but mostly single family homes; many of Boston's civil servants live there.

West Roxbury is home to District E-5 of the Boston Police Department. Boston Emergency Medical Services Ambulance 5, which posts at the intersection of West Roxbury Parkway at Centre St, and Paramedic 5, stationed at the Faulkner Hospital, provide EMS service. There are two Boston fire stations: Ladder 25 and Engine 30 on Centre Street, and Engine 55 on Washington Street. A large Veterans Affairs hospital is located opposite the Charles River on the VFW Parkway near the Dedham line.

The Needham Branch of the MBTA Commuter Rail network has three stations in West Roxbury (Bellevue, Highland and West Roxbury). Several MBTA bus lines run through and/or terminate in West Roxbury.

West Roxbury is home to several places of worship, including three Catholic parishes, churches of various Protestant denominations, and a Jewish synagogue.

The neighborhood was home to an experimental transcendentalist Utopian community called Brook Farm, which attracted notable figures including Margaret Fuller and Nathaniel Hawthorne, whose 1852 novel The Blithedale Romance is based on his stay there.

Like that of its neighboring communities, West Roxbury's residential development coincided with the construction of the West Roxbury branch of the Boston and Providence Railroad, and the area grew further with the development of electric streetcars.

== Demographics ==
Until the 2000 census West Roxbury's population had been recorded as declining slightly, but it increased at the 2010 census.

2010 Census 30,446 (4.9% of 617,594 citywide)
2000 Census 28,663 (4.9% of 589,141 citywide)
1990 Census 29,706 (5.2% of 574,383 citywide)
1980 Census 31,333
Population growth/decline, 2000–2010: +6.2%
Population growth/decline, 1990–2000: -3.51%
Population growth/decline, 1980–1990: -5.19%

West Roxbury has historically been a heavily Irish Catholic neighborhood. In the twentieth century, upwardly mobile Irish Americans moved to the neighborhood from elsewhere in Boston as well as directly from Ireland. By the end of the 20th century and the beginning of the 21st century, an influx of new residents contributed to increased ethnic and racial diversity in the neighborhood.

The Irish Social Club of Boston, founded in Dorchester in 1945, moved its headquarters to West Roxbury in 1978, and had a membership of 15,000 in the mid-1970s. The club closed in 2011 due to financial troubles and declining membership (the club had around 300 members at the time, mostly seniors). Support from the State Representative Ed Coppinger, Boston City Councilor Matt O’Malley, and State Senator Mike Rush allowed the club to obtain a liquor license and reopen, and by 2013 the group had about 800 members.

In March 1965, an investigative study of property tax assessment practices published by the National Tax Association of 13,769 properties sold within the City of Boston under Mayor John F. Collins from 1 January 1960 to 31 March 1964, found that the assessed values in Roxbury in 1962 were at 68 percent of market values while the assessed values in West Roxbury were at 41 percent of market values, and the researchers could not find a nonracial explanation for the difference.

== Theodore Parker Church ==
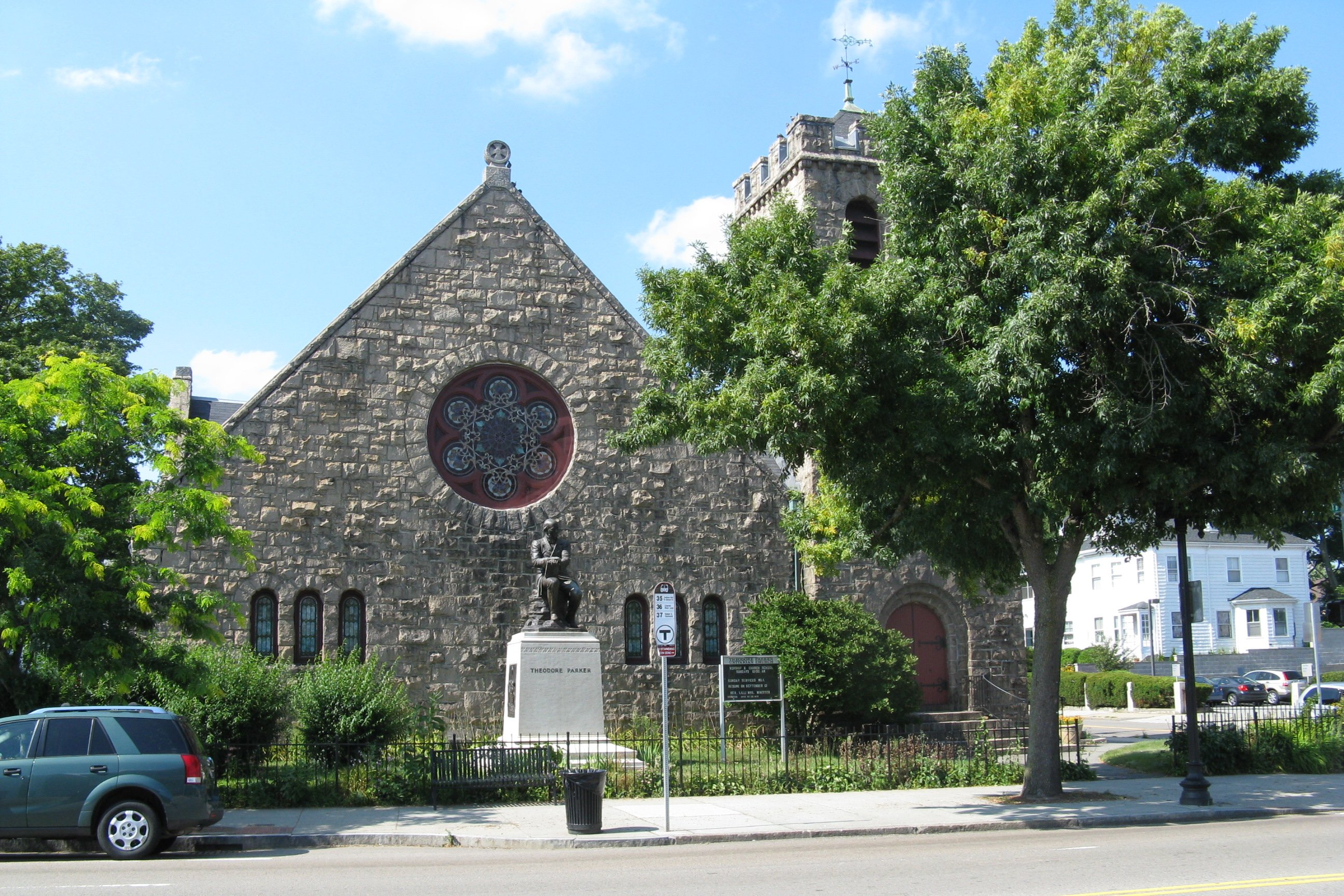
The front face of West Roxbury's Theodore Parker Church, featuring one of its stained glass windows.

At Centre and Corey Streets, the Theodore Parker Church, a Boston Landmark, features seven stained glass windows made by the Tiffany Studios between 1894 and 1927. The original church, designed in 1890 by Alexander Wadsworth Longfellow Jr., is now a parish hall. Henry Seaver designed the current church in 1900. Theodore Parker (1810–1860), an advocate of progressive religious ideas, abolitionism and women's suffrage, was minister of this Unitarian congregation from 1837 to 1846.

== Westerly Burying Ground conflict and secession ==
Westerly Burying Ground (also known as Westerly Burial Ground), located at Centre and LaGrange Streets, was established in 1683 to permit local burial of residents of Jamaica Plain and the western end of Roxbury. When West Roxbury was still part of Roxbury, the town's first burial place was what is today Eliot Burying Ground near Dudley Square. This was a long distance to travel for the inhabitants of West Roxbury, and in 1683 the town selectmen voted to establish a local burying place, now known as Westerly Burying Ground. A conflict between the rural and more urbanised parts of the town led to the split of West Roxbury from Roxbury proper in 1851. West Roxbury became part of the City of Boston on 5 January 1874.

Westerly Burying Ground served as West Roxbury's burial place well into the 19th century. The oldest graves contain many of the town's earliest and most prominent families. Eight veterans of the American Revolution and fifteen veterans of the American Civil War are also buried here. War veterans interred are detailed in the article “Westerly" and the Civil War.

The site has a large collection of three centuries of funerary art. One-third of its extant gravestones date from the 18th century, almost half from the 19th century, and about 20 from the 20th century. Westerly Burying Ground has many individual mound tombs; mound tombs at other burying grounds are typically larger, built to contain a number of bodies. The oldest gravestone, from 1691, commemorates James and Merriam Draper, members of a prominent West Roxbury family. Locally-carved headstones provide an historic record of three centuries of West Roxbury residents.

== Boston United Hand in Hand Cemetery ==
Boston United Hand in Hand Cemetery is located on Centre Street straddling the Dedham line. Dating back to 1875, the original plot was full by 1896 but subsequently expanded multiple times. There are graves as recent as 1980 in the West Roxbury portion; the Dedham portion is still active. Chestnut Hill's Congregation Mishka Tefila currently owns the cemetery.

== Government and infrastructure ==
The United States Postal Service operates the West Roxbury Post Office in West Roxbury. West Roxbury is represented by a city councilor, Ben Weber.

== Education ==
=== Primary and secondary schools ===
The Boston Public Schools sites Ludwig van Beethoven Elementary School, William Ohrenberger School, Joyce Kilmer K-8 School, and Patrick Lyndon K-8 School are in West Roxbury. The three schools in the West Roxbury Education Complex, Media Communications Technology High School, Parkway Academy of Technology and Health, and the Urban Science Academy were located in West Roxbury, but closed in 2019 due to structural issues in the building.

The Roxbury Latin School, a private school for boys, is located in West Roxbury. The Roman Catholic Archdiocese of Boston operates the Holy Name Parish School as well as the St. Theresa of Avila School in West Roxbury.

Catholic Memorial School, an all-boys private middle and high school, is located on Baker Street.

=== Public libraries ===
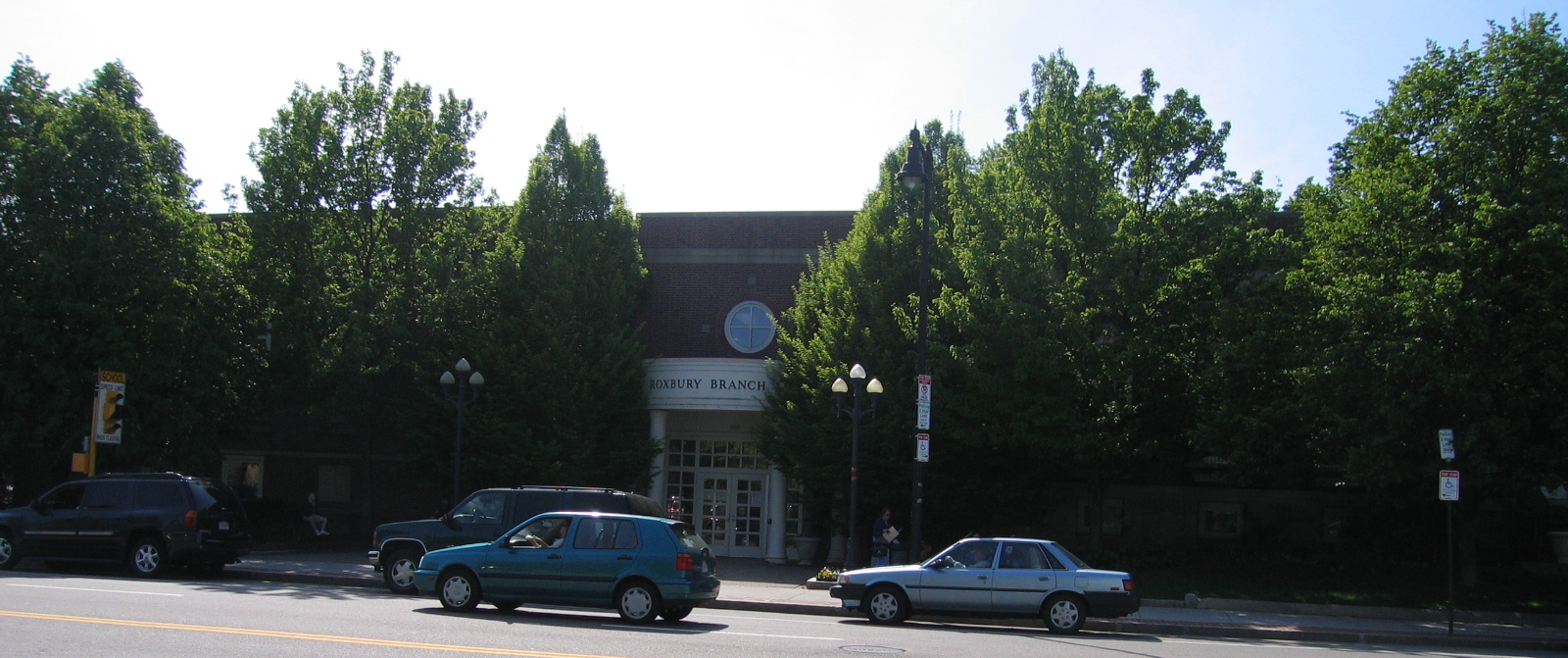
West Roxbury Branch Library

Boston Public Library operates the West Roxbury Branch Library. In 1876, the city library took over the West Roxbury Free Library, establishing a delivery station in West Roxbury. The West Roxbury facility was upgraded to a library branch in 1896. In the years of 1921 and 1922 a library building was constructed on the West Roxbury Branch Library current site. In 1973, a fire destroyed the adjacent West Roxbury Congregational Church. The land formerly occupied by the church was donated to the trustees of the library system so an addition could be built. The addition opened to the public on 24 September 1989.

== Events ==
The Corrib Classic 5K Road Race, a benefit event hosted by the Corrib Pub and Restaurant, is held annually at Billings Field on LaGrange Street the first Sunday in June. Beginning in 1994 with 250 runners, the race has grown into a large neighborhood event, annually attracting about 2,000 runners plus volunteers, families, and friends. Centre and Lagrange Streets are briefly closed during the race. As of 2010, the Corrib Classic had raised over $700,000 for a variety of local causes.

The Parkway Little League Parade, is a small event to start little league baseball and softball for the areas of West Roxbury and Roslindale. Young baseball and softball players dress up in their team uniforms and march from Fallon field in Roslindale to the Guy Cammarata Complex in West Roxbury.

The Shamrock Shootout is an annual street hockey tournament that takes place in West Roxbury. The event was started in 2008 for neighborhood children who were home from school for Evacuation Day. As of 2025, the shootout had grown to 650 participants and was supported by partners like the Boston Police Department and Boston Bruins hockey team.

== Notable people ==
- Nathan Blecharczyk, co-founder of Airbnb
- Ellery Clark, U.S. Olympic champion, Athens 1896
- Rich Cronin, singer, songwriter, lead singer for LFO
- Patrick DeCoste, rock guitarist
- Edward Downes, musicologist and radio quizmaster
- Frederick Winthrop Faxon, bibliographer and publisher
- Sears Gallagher, noted American artist
- Anthony Michael Hall, actor
- Alfred Clifton Hughes, former Roman Catholic Archbishop of New Orleans.
- Thomas G. Kelley, Medal of Honor recipient (Vietnam War)
- Dan Kiley, modernist landscape architect
- Willis Lent, rear admiral in the United States Navy
- William Martin, novelist
- Joe Nash, former NFL player
- Chris Nilan, former NHL player and coach.
- Richard Olney, former United States Attorney General and Secretary of State
- Marianne Dwight Orvis 19th-century watercolorist and writer
- Ron Perry, Holy Cross basketball
- Jack Rathbone, NHL player for the Vancouver Canucks
- Taylor Schilling, actress
- Robert Gould Shaw, officer in the Union Army during the American Civil War
- Francis A. Sullivan, professor, theologian, ecclesiologist
- Kevin White, 20-year mayor of the City of Boston

== Sites of interest ==
- The Roxbury Latin School
- Bellevue Standpipe, Bellevue Hill, Stony Brook Reservation
- Holy Name Parish School
- Saint Teresa of Ávila Church (Roman Catholic)
- Westerly Burial Ground
- Catholic Memorial School
- Theodore Parker Church
- Boston Public Library West Roxbury Branch
- Millennium Park
- Brook Farm—1840s utopian experiment in communal living
- City of Boston Archives
- Veterans Administration Hospital
- Annunciation Melkite Catholic Cathedral Located on the VFW Parkway

== Gallery ==
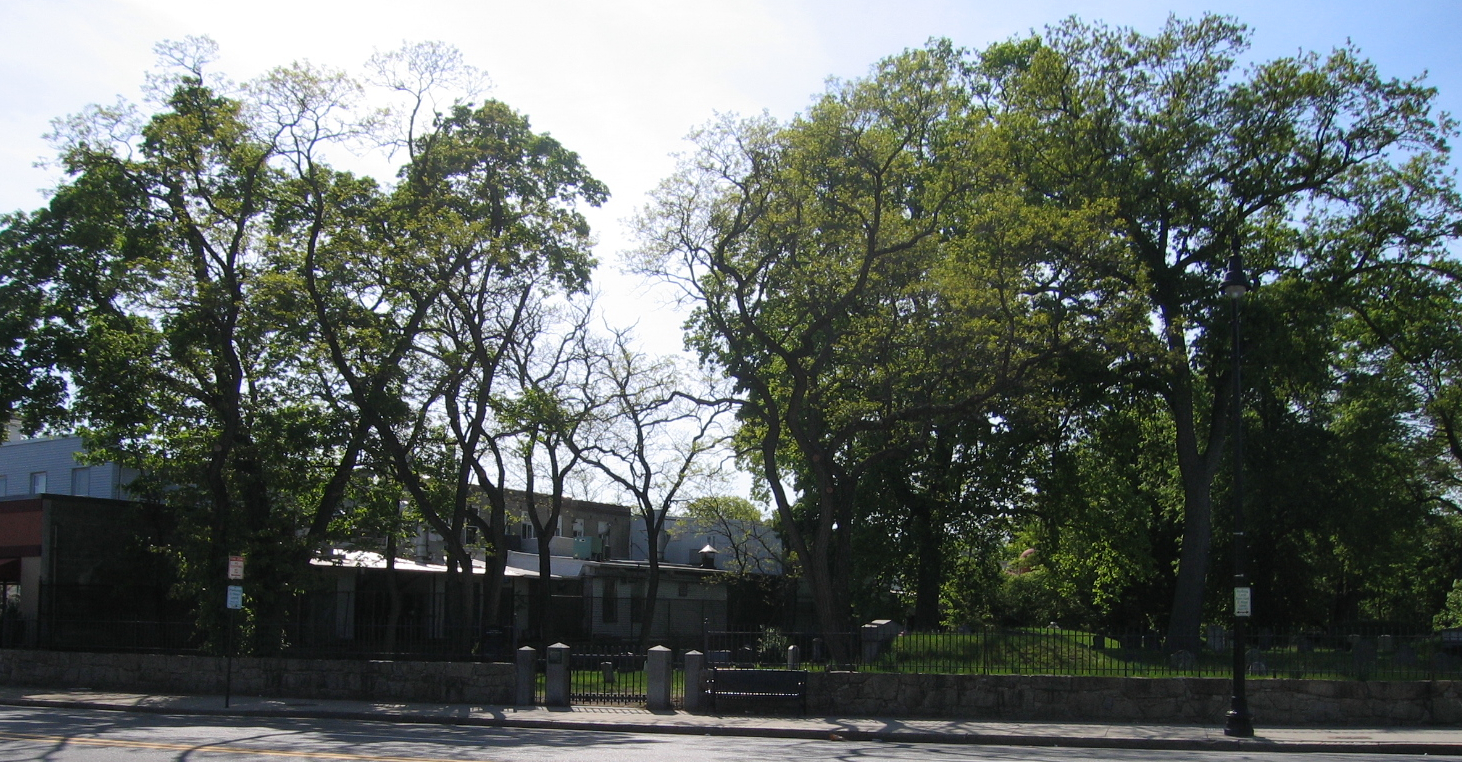
Westerly Burying Ground, general view

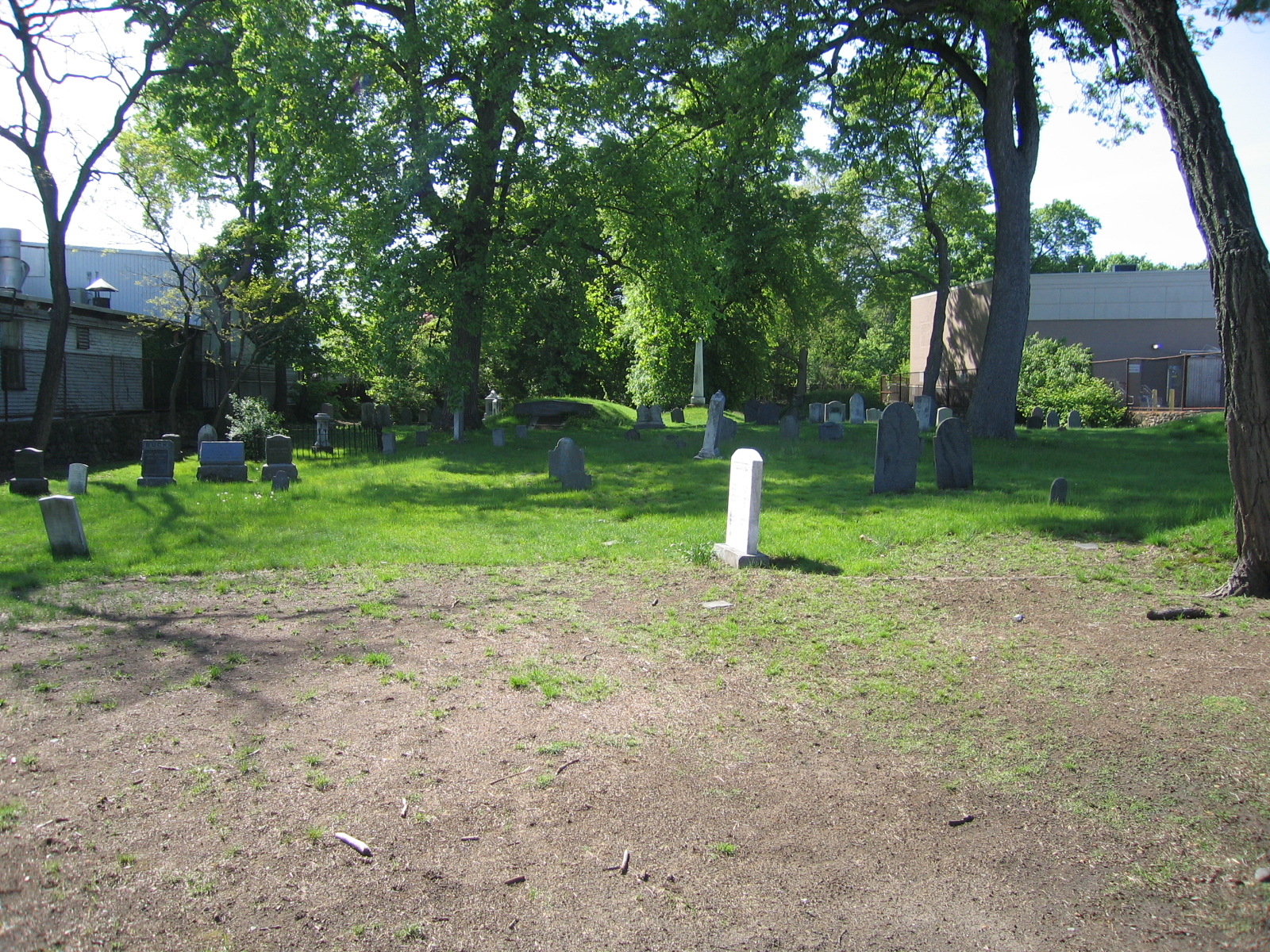
Westerly Burying Ground, close-up 1

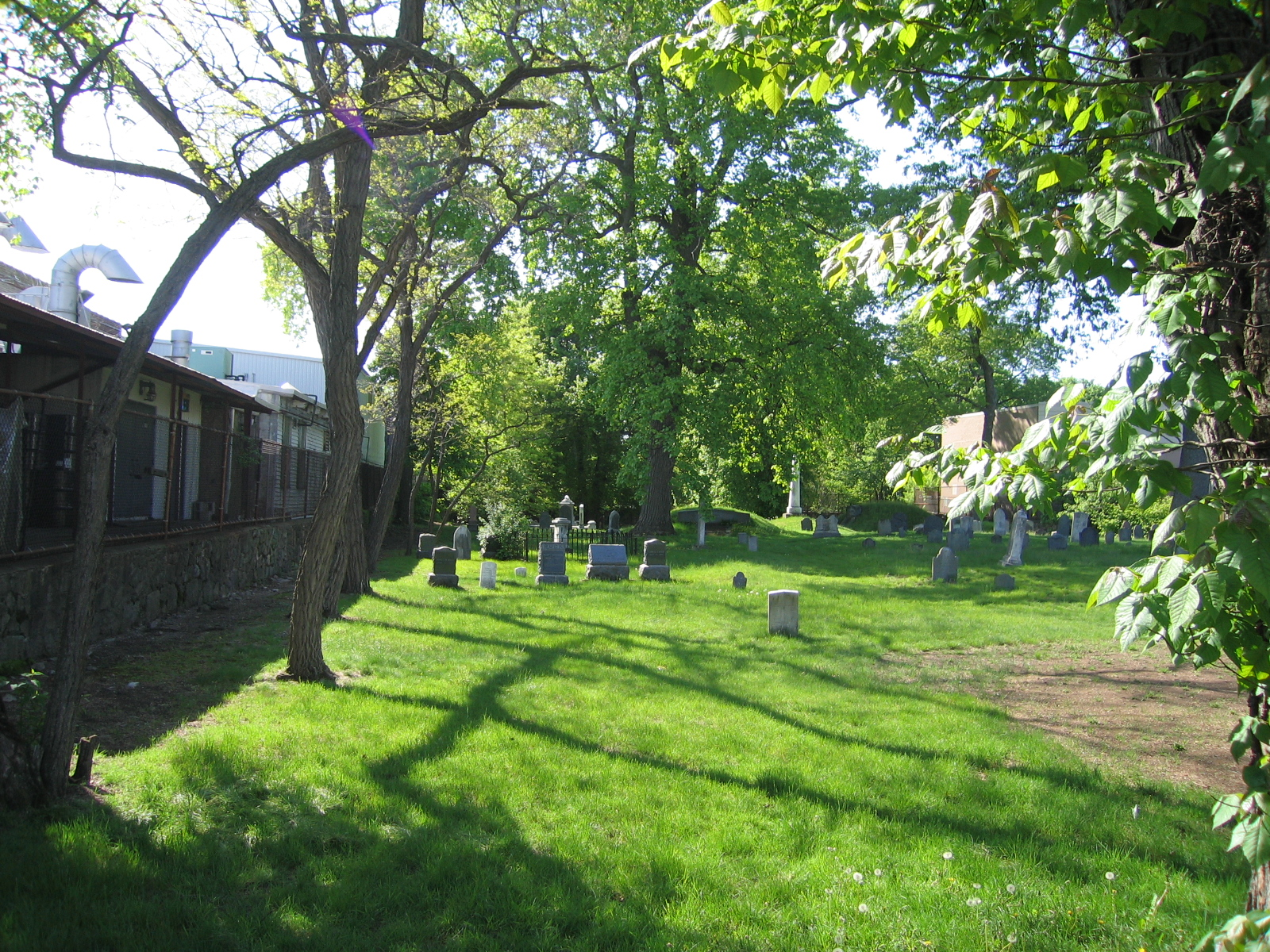
Westerly Burying Ground, close-up 2

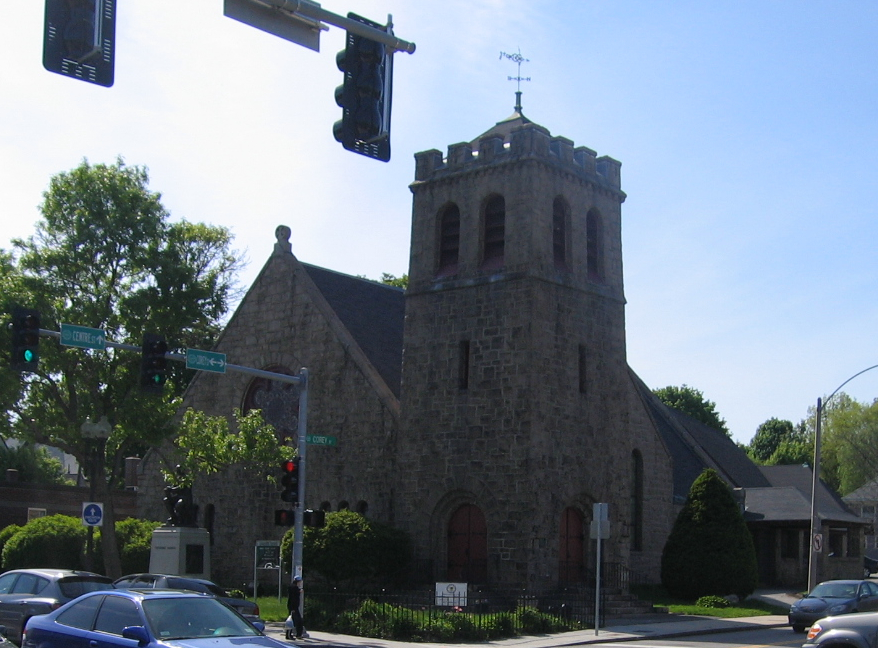
Theodore Parker Church (Unitarian)

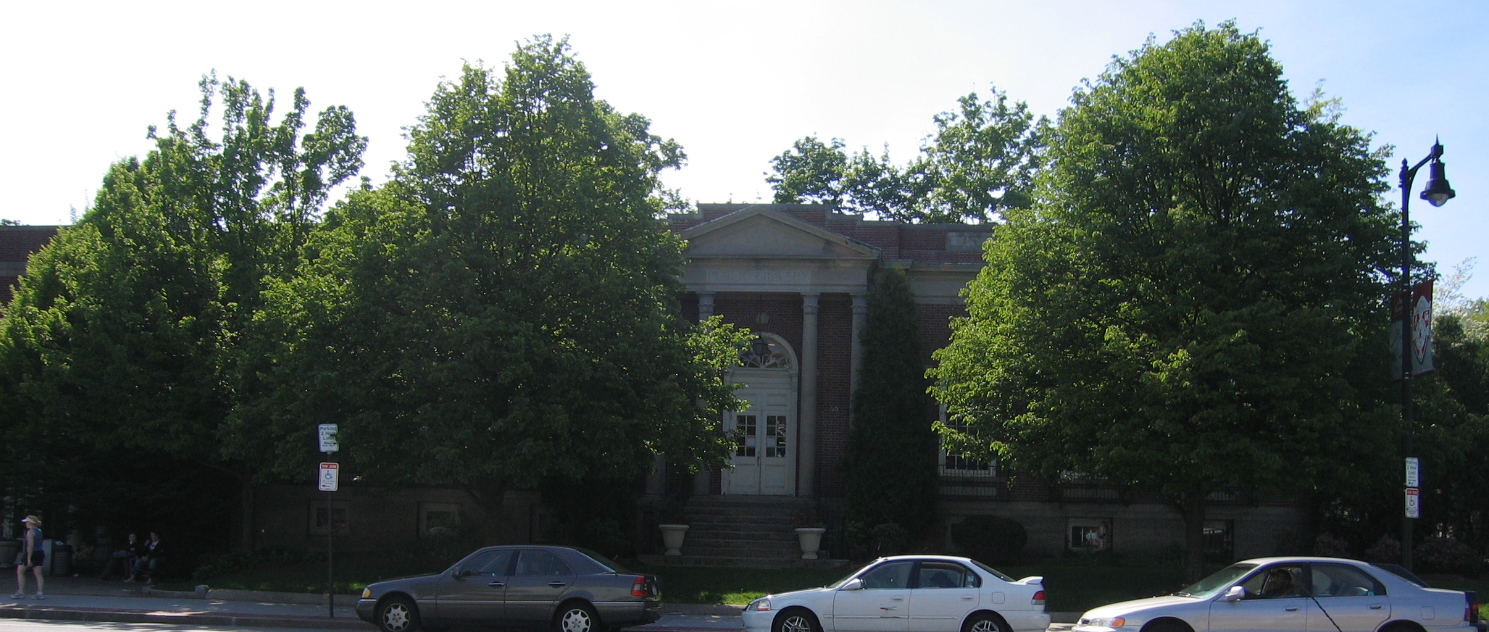
West Roxbury Free Library, 1921-2 wing

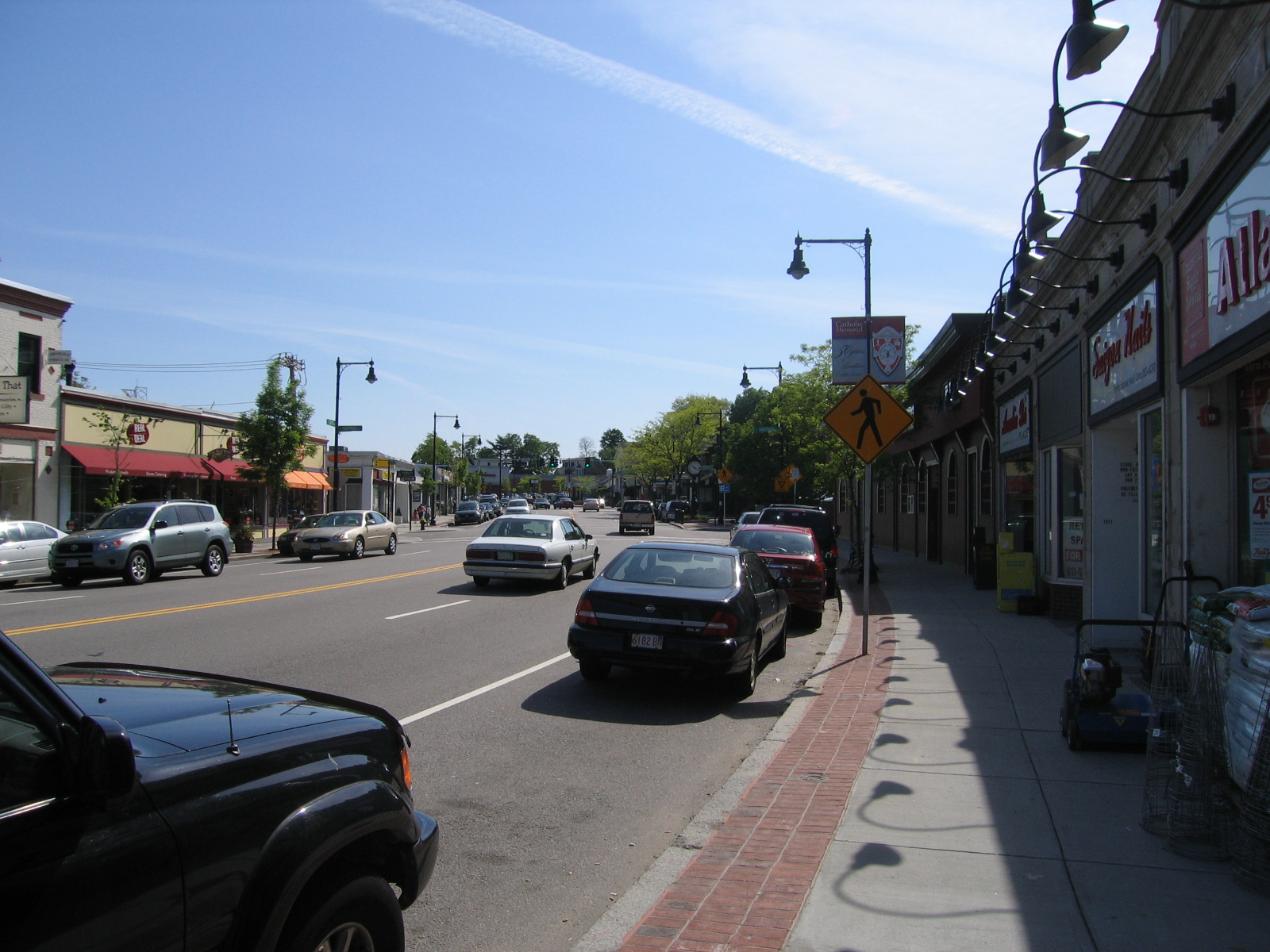
Centre Street, West Roxbury's main artery

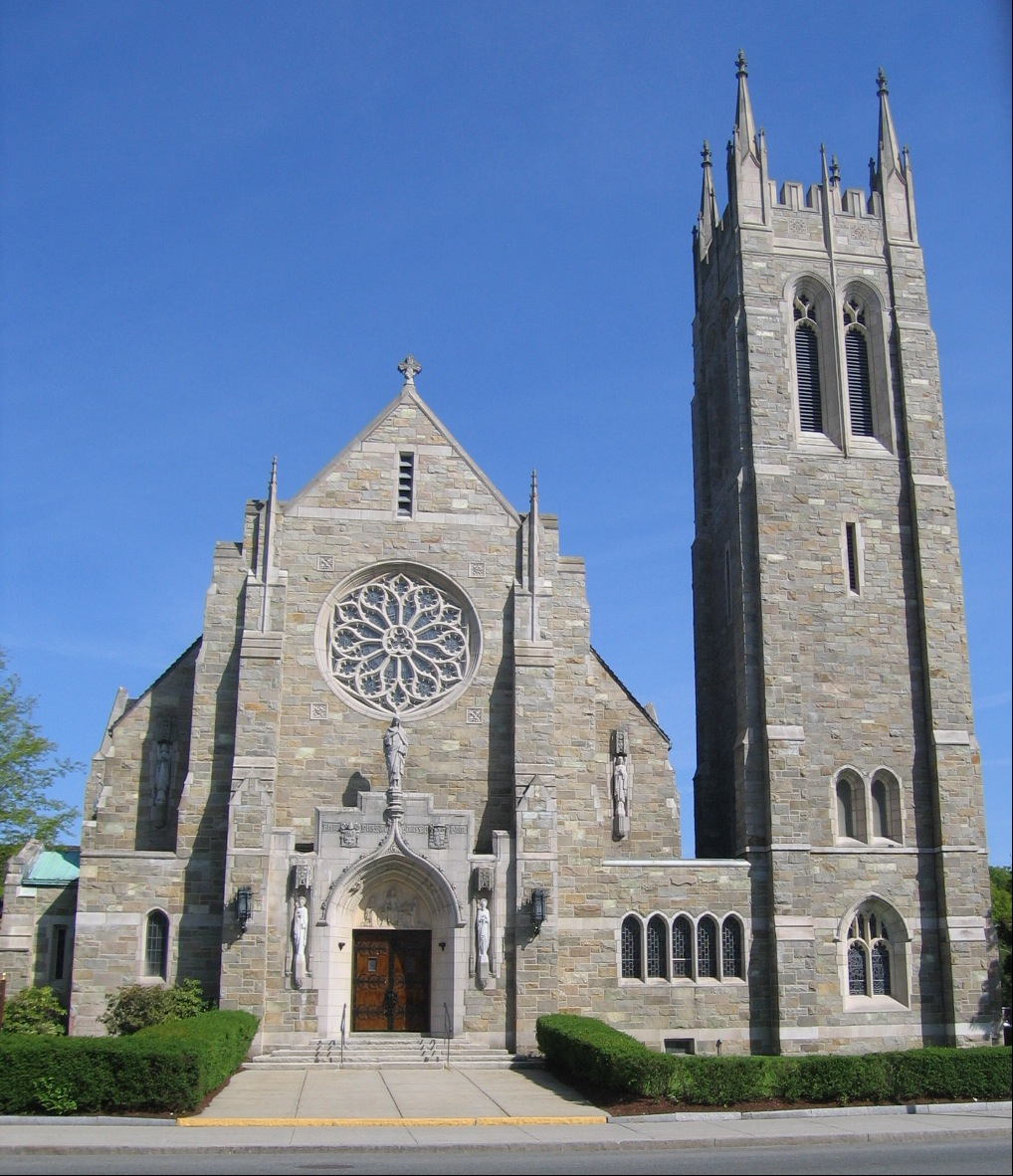
Saint Teresa of Ávila Church (Roman Catholic)
