= DeCoste =

DeCoste is a surname. Notable people with the surname include:

- David DeCoste, American politician
- John Everett DeCoste, better known as Terry Carter (1928–2024), American actor and filmmaker
- Patrick DeCoste, American rock guitarist

== See also ==
- Jonathan Decoste, Canadian cinematographer
- Jean-Baptiste Décoste, Haitian prelate
