= Joseph G. McKenna =

Brother Joseph G. McKenna

5th President of Iona College
- In office 1965–1971
- Preceded by: Richard B. Power
- Succeeded by: John G. Driscoll

Vice President of Iona College
- In office 1963–1965
- President: Richard B. Power

Dean of Iona College
- In office 1952–1957

Personal details
- Born: 1922 New York City, U.S.
- Died: July 28, 1973 (aged 51) San Francisco, California, U.S.
- Education: Fordham University (MA); Columbia University (PhD)

Joseph Gonzaga McKenna, CFC (1922 – July 28, 1973) was an American educator and member of the Congregation of Christian Brothers, a Roman Catholic religious institute. He served as the fifth president of Iona College in New Rochelle, New York.

== Early life and education ==
McKenna was born in 1922 in New York City, where he was raised with a sister, Mary. He joined the Congregation of Christian Brothers in 1936 at the age of 14.

In 1951 he graduated from Fordham University with a master's degree, and received a PhD in 1955 from Columbia University. He additionally earned a bachelor's degree and a second master's.

== Academic career ==
After graduating college, Brother McKenna began teaching at All Hallows Institute in 1942, and later taught at Rice High School, Iona Preparatory School, and Power Memorial Academy over the next eight years. In 1950, he became a mathematics professor at Iona College, and two years later was appointed dean of the college.

He served in that capacity until 1957, when he left New York to found Catholic Memorial High School in West Roxbury, Boston, Massachusetts, the first Christian Brothers school in New England. He served as principal there until 1963.

=== President of Iona College ===
McKenna returned to Iona College in 1963, and served there as vice president until 1965, when he became the college's 5th president. Under his leadership, the college notably changed from an all-male institution to a coeducational college. The decision, made by the college's board of trustees, was announced by McKenna in November 1968. The change in policy, which would take effect with the first female students entering Iona as freshmen in September 1969, was explained by McKenna in a press release:

The change is not as drastic as one may assume. The entrance of women into the other divisions of Iona that took place during the past four years was preparing the college, whether we realized it or not, for the recent decision of the board."

The decision for Iona to adopt coeducation was part of a national trend, with 62 single-sex colleges going coed in 1968 alone. Within the Iona and regional communities, the change was met with mixed but mostly positive reactions. The mayor of New Rochelle, where the college is located, expressed his approval, as did several Iona professors, and students. McKenna's predecessor as president of Iona College, Br. Richard B. Power, said, "While I do not like to see Iona become a coeducational institution, I can understand the decision of the board of trustees and I look forward with interest to this latest development in the history of the college." Additionally, the representative of the junior class express student acceptance of the decision, while noting the possible lack of sufficient space to house female boarders.

In 1971, McKenna resigned as president due to ill health, but continued to teach graduate students in the school of business. In addition to his work at Iona College, he also served as assistant to the superior of the Eastern American Province of the Congregation of Christian Brothers.

== Death and legacy ==
McKenna died on July 28, 1973, of a heart attack while on vacation in San Francisco at the age of 51.

McKenna's legacy is continued through the Brother Joseph G. McKenna Memorial Award for Academic Excellence, presented annually by the faculty of Iona College's Hagan School of Business.
