= Our Marathon: The Boston Bombing Digital Archive =

Our Marathon: The Boston Bombing Digital Archive is a crowdsourced archive of stories, photos, videos, and social media related to the 2013 Boston Marathon bombing and its aftermath. A community project hosted at Northeastern University, Our Marathon began collecting content in May 2013.

== Overview ==
Our Marathon is a project housed at Northeastern University's NULab for Texts, Maps, and Networks, the university's center for Digital Humanities and Computational Social Science. The archive is a digital preservation project modeled on the September 11 Digital Archive and similar initiatives.

Our Marathon's project partners include WBUR, WCVB-TV, The Boston City Archives, and The Digital Public Library of America. In April 2014, a temporary exhibition called "Dear Boston: Messages from the Marathon Memorial" opened at the Boston Public Library. The exhibit features items left at a makeshift memorial created at Copley Square in the wake of the 2013 Boston Marathon bombings. With the support of Iron Mountain, the Boston City Archives was able to scan and digitize these items, as well as letters sent to the City of Boston in the days and months following the bombings. These digitized items have been added to Our Marathon's archive.

In April 2014, WBUR began airing "Boston Marathon Reflections," a series of audio clips from interviews gathered by oral historians working with Our Marathon. Additional clips and interviews are archived on Our Marathon's WBUR Oral History Project page.
