= Persis Yu =

American politician

Member-elect of the Massachusetts Senate from the Norfolk and Suffolk district
- Assuming office TBD
- Succeeding: Mike Rush

Personal details
- Party: Democratic
- Education: Mount Holyoke College (BA); University of Washington (MSW); Seattle University School of Law (JD)

Persis SiChing Yu is an American consumer attorney and member-elect of the Massachusetts Senate from the Norfolk and Suffolk district. She worked as an attorney with the Student Borrower Protection Center and the National Consumer Law Center.

== Early life and education ==
Yu stated that her grandfather was killed in a re-education camp in China and that her father had to flee on a train at 7-years old with a woman who pretended to be his mother, eventually landing in the United States. She earned a Bachelor of Arts from Mount Holyoke College, a Master of Social Work from the University of Washington, and a Juris Doctor from the Seattle University School of Law.
