= Highland station (MBTA) =

Railway station in Boston, MA

Highland
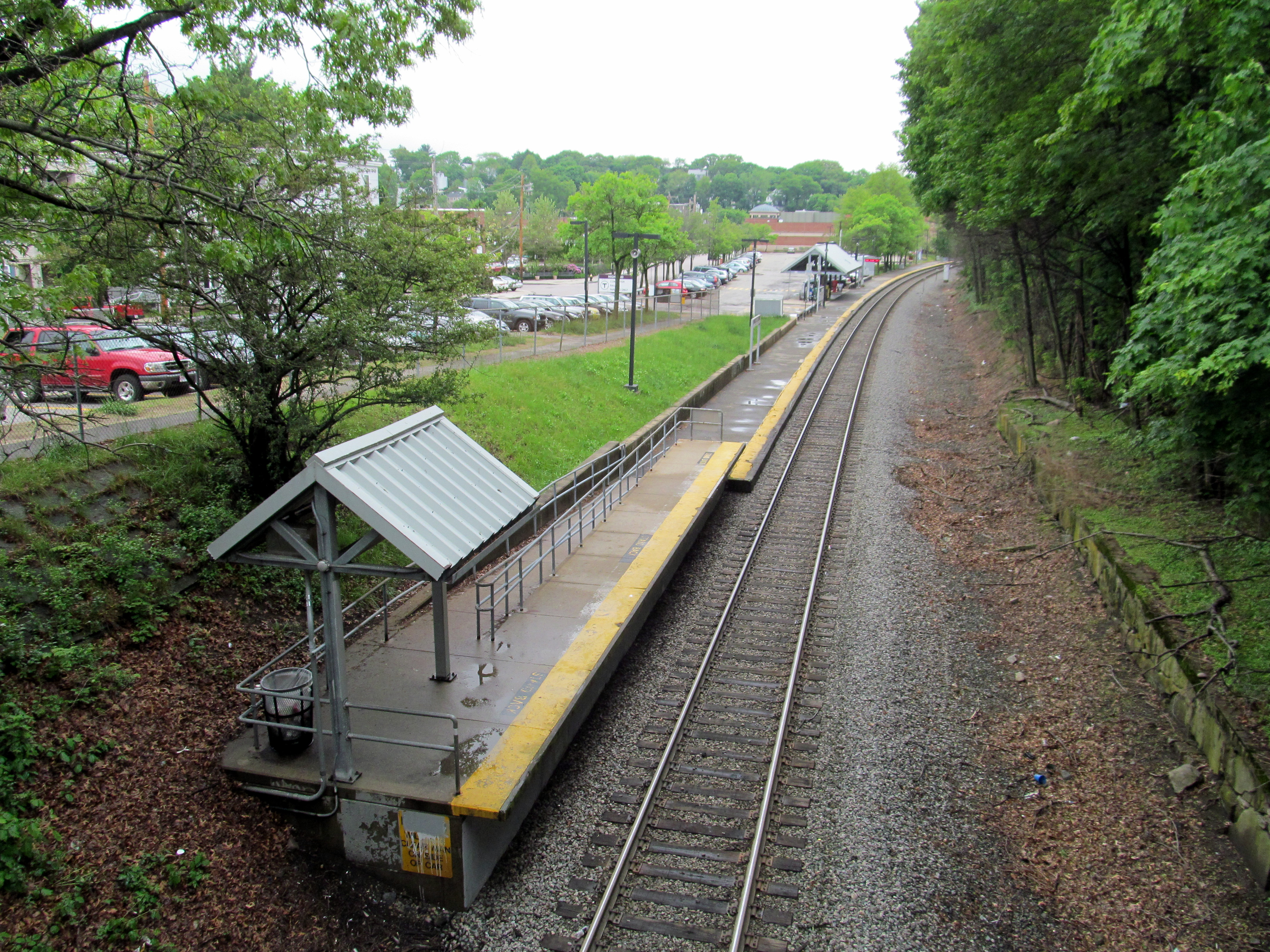
- Highland station in May 2012

General information
- Location: Corey Street and Hastings Street; West Roxbury, Boston, Massachusetts
- Coordinates: 42.285°N 71.154°W
- Line: Needham Branch (West Roxbury Branch)
- Platforms: 1 side platform
- Tracks: 1
- Connections: MBTA bus: 35, 36, 37

Construction
- Parking: 175 spaces ($4.00 fee)
- Accessible: Yes

Other information
- Fare zone: 1

History
- Opened: c. 1855

Passengers
- 2024: 338 daily boardings

Services
Preceding station	MBTA	Following station
West Roxbury toward Needham Heights	Needham Line	Bellevue toward South Station
Former services
Preceding station	MBTA	Following station
West Roxbury toward Millis	Millis Branch Closed 1967	Bellevue toward South Station
Preceding station	New York, New Haven and Hartford Railroad	Following station
West Roxbury toward Woonsocket	Charles River Line	Bellevue toward Boston
Location

Highland station is an MBTA Commuter Rail station in Boston, Massachusetts. It serves the Needham Line. It is located in the Bellevue Hill section of West Roxbury. The station has a mini-high platform for accessibility.

The station originally opened around 1855 on the Boston and Providence Railroad's West Roxbury Branch. A stone station building, similar to one constructed at Mount Hope station the previous year, was built in 1885.

The MBTA expanded the parking lot in the early 1990s.
