= Devon Marshall =

American football player (born 2004)

Profile
- Position: Cornerback

Personal information
- Born: August 27, 2004 (age 22)
- Listed height: 5 ft 11 in (1.80 m)
- Listed weight: 200 lb (91 kg)

Career information
- High school: Catholic Memorial School (Boston, Massachusetts)
- College: Villanova (2022–2023); NC State (2024–2025)
- NFL draft: 2026: undrafted

Career history
- Jacksonville Jaguars (2026)*
- * Offseason or practice squad member only
- Stats at Pro Football Reference

Devon Marshall (born August 27, 2004) is an American professional football cornerback. He played college football for the Villanova Wildcats and NC State Wolfpack.

== Early life ==
Marshall is a native of Boston. He attended Catholic Memorial School in West Roxbury, and competed in track and field in addition to football. Marshall had five punt and kickoff return touchdowns during his high school years. He committed to play college football at Villanova.

== College career ==
Marshall played 2022 and 2023 at Villanova and had 60 tackles, 13 passes broken up and 3.5 tackles for loss in 22 games. He transferred to NC State before the 2024 season. In two years at NC State, he had 59 tackles and four interceptions. In 2025, Marshall posted 16 pass breakups, 50 tackles and two interceptions. He was named Second Team All-American by The Athletic. Marshall was selected to play in the East-West Shrine Bowl.

== Professional career ==
Pre-draft measurables
Height	Weight	Arm length	Hand span	Wingspan	40-yard dash	10-yard split	20-yard split	20-yard shuttle	Three-cone drill	Vertical jump	Broad jump	Bench press
5 ft 10 in (1.78 m)	194 lb (88 kg)	30 7/8 in (0.78 m)	8 3/4 in (0.22 m)	6 ft 2 3/4 in (1.90 m)	4.65 s	1.59 s	2.63 s	4.40 s	7.02 s	32.5 in (0.83 m)	10 ft 3 in (3.12 m)	12 reps
All values from Pro Day

After not being selected in the 2026 NFL draft, Marshall was signed by the Jacksonville Jaguars as an undrafted free agent. He was waived/injured by the Jaguars on August 23.
