= Stony Brook Gatehouse =

Coordinates: 42.3415°N 71.0925°W

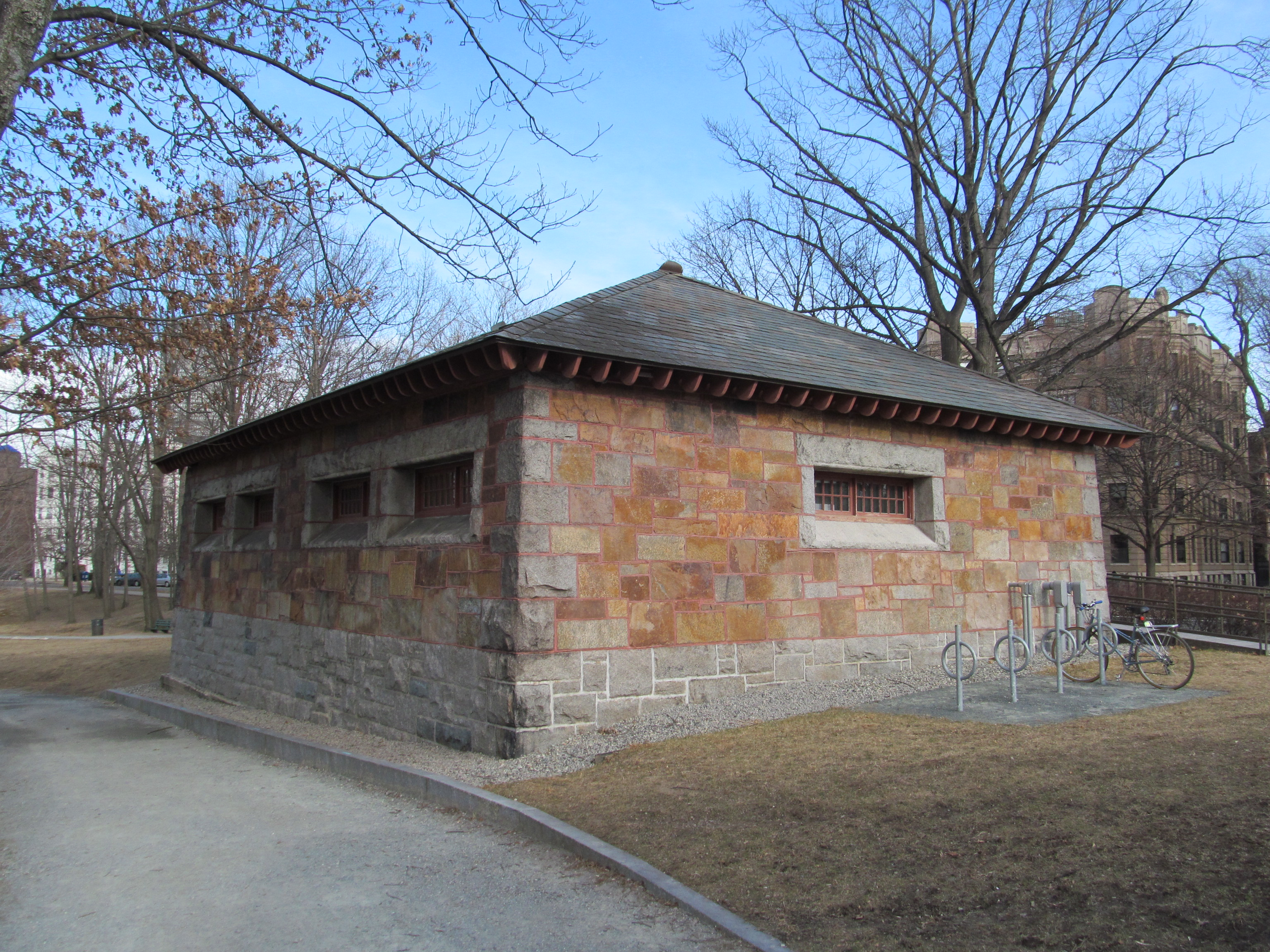
Stony Brook Gatehouse

The Stony Brook Gatehouse is a former gatehouse in The Fens in Boston, located next to The Fenway east of Forsyth Way. It formerly controlled flow from the Stony Brook into the Muddy River. The structure was designed around 1881 by Henry Hobson Richardson, who also designed several bridges in the park. The building features a slate roof with distinctive wooden beams and walls of smooth stones of varying cuts. The red mortar used between the stone is similar to that of many of Richardson's other works. A near-identical companion building, designed by Richardson's successors Shepley, Rutan and Coolidge, was constructed in 1905 when the Stony Brook culvert was enlarged.

In 2010, the building was refurbished for use as the Emerald Necklace Conservancy's Shattuck Visitor Center.
