= Forbes Hill Standpipe =

- U.S. National Register of Historic Places
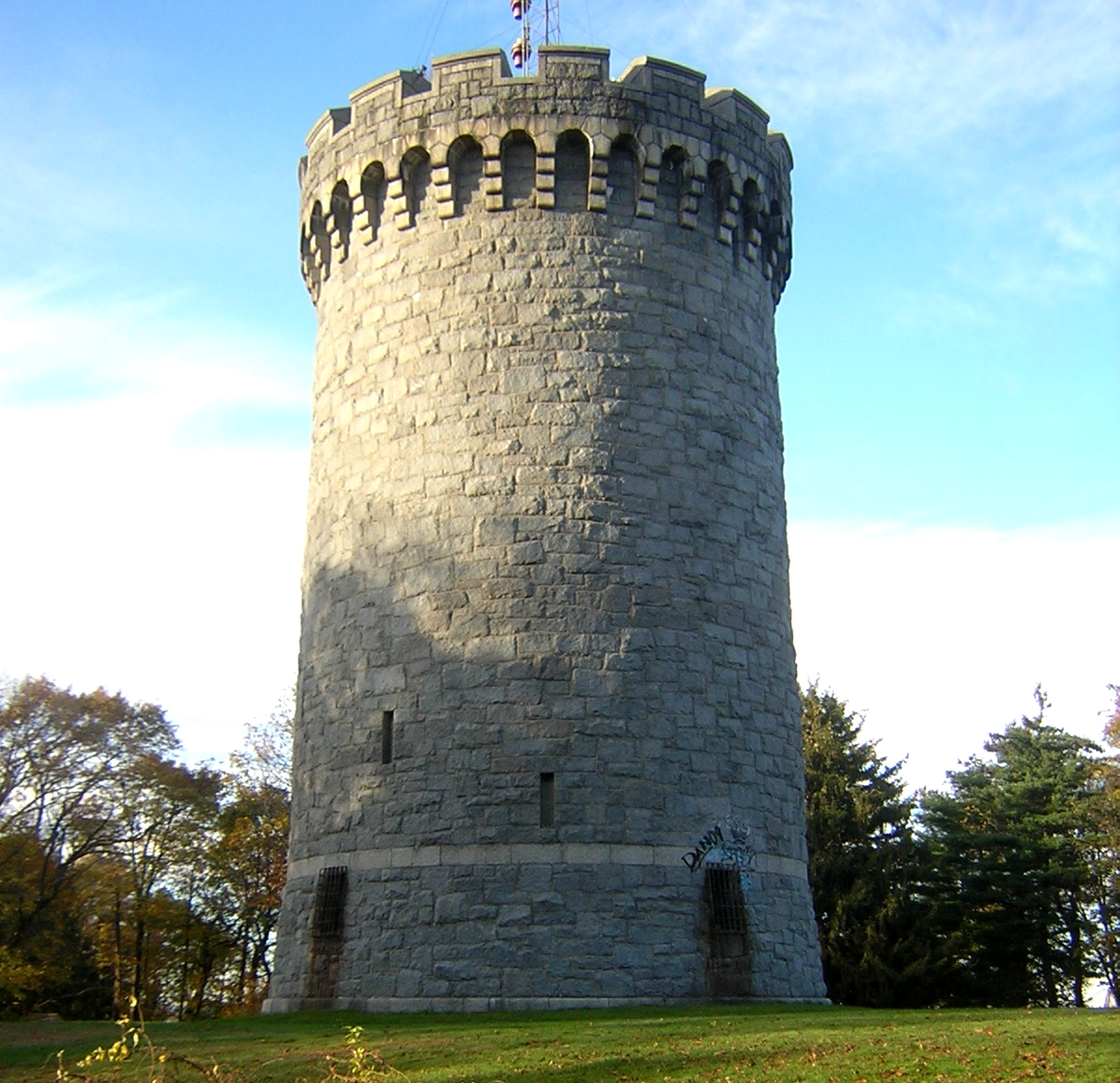

- Location within Massachusetts Location within the United States
- Location: Reservoir Rd., Quincy, Massachusetts
- Coordinates: 42°15′27.5″N 71°1′41.9″W
- Area: 1 acre (0.40 ha)
- Built: 1900
- MPS: Water Supply System of Metropolitan Boston MPS
- NRHP reference No.: 89002252
- Added to NRHP: January 18, 1990

The Forbes Hill Standpipe is a historic water tower structure located on Reservoir Road in Quincy, Massachusetts, USA. The tower was built in 1899-1902 to contain a 330,000 US gallons (1,200,000 L; 270,000 imp gal) steel water tank. The site originally included an adjacent reservoir that supplied Quincy with water from the Metropolitan Boston Water System. The standpipe was taken out of service in 1955 and the reservoir was filled in.

It was added to the National Register of Historic Places in 1990.

== History ==
The tower was constructed by the Metropolitan Water Board (now the MWRA), after the City of Quincy joined the system in 1897. Dexter Brackett was the supervising engineer for the project. It is built from local Quincy granite, and is 30 feet (9.1 m) in diameter and 64 feet (20 m) in height. Although now closed to the public, the crenelated tower roof is accessible via a spiral staircase located between the steel tank and inside tower walls. The standpipe and reservoir were fed from the Chestnut Hill Reservoir. The adjacent rectangular reservoir measured 280 feet long by 100 feet wide at the bottom, with sloping concrete sides, and an average depth of 18 feet.

The Forbes Hill reservoir provided a reserve capacity of 5,100,000 US gallons (19,000,000 L; 4,200,000 imp gal), as part of the southern high-service system that fed Quincy, Milton and parts of nearby Dorchester. The Forbes Hill reservoir and standpipe were discontinued in the 1950s, after the construction of the Blue Hills Reservoir in the southern part of Quincy.

Radio equipment at the tower serves the Minuteman Repeater Association, a regional amateur radio club.

== See also ==
- Arlington Reservoir (Arlington, Massachusetts)
- Bellevue Standpipe
- Chestnut Hill Reservoir Historic District
- National Register of Historic Places listings in Quincy, Massachusetts
