= Stony Brook Reservation =

State park in Boston, US

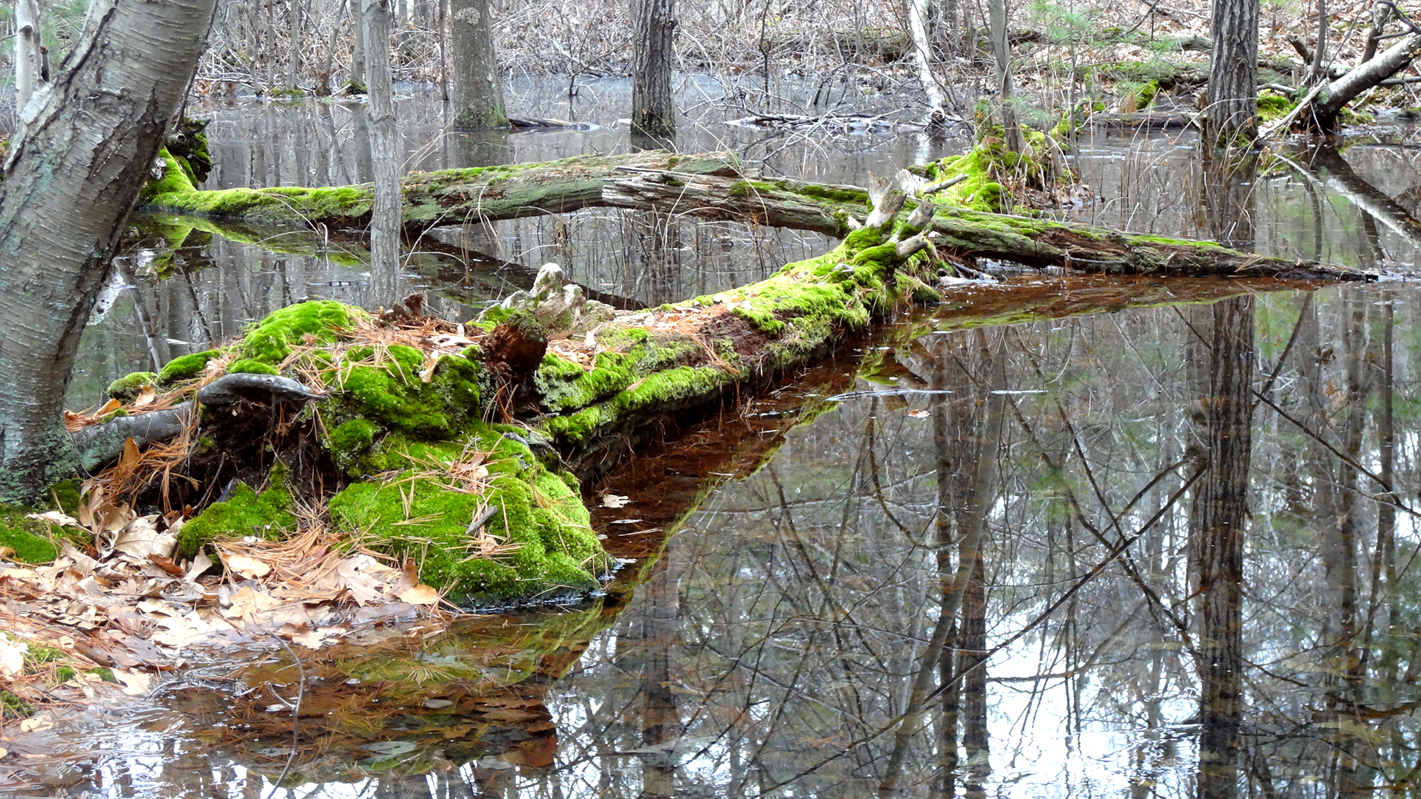

- Location within Massachusetts Location within the United States
- Location: Boston and Dedham, Massachusetts, United States
- Coordinates: 42°15′59″N 71°08′34″W
- Area: 616 acres (249 ha)
- Elevation: 128 ft (39 m)
- Established: 1894
- Administrator: Massachusetts Department of Conservation and Recreation
- Website: Official website

Stony Brook Reservation is a woodland park in Boston and Dedham, Massachusetts, a unit of the Metropolitan Park System of Greater Boston, part of the state park system of Massachusetts. It was established in 1894 as one of the five original reservations created by the Metropolitan Park Commission. The park is served by the Stony Brook Reservation Parkways, a road system that was entered into the National Register of Historic Places in 2006.

== Location ==
The park is located in the southwest of Boston. Its main contiguous section extends southwards from Washington Street in the West Roxbury neighborhood to Mother Brook in the Hyde Park neighborhood, with an additional 14.2 acres (5.7 ha) southwest along a roadway to Mother Brook in Dedham. An adjacent portion encompasses the Bellevue Hill water towers on the north side of Washington Street.

Stony Brook Reservation contains the headwaters of Stony Brook. Park elevations range from Mother Brook at 15 feet (4.6 m) to Bellevue Hill, at 338 feet (103 m) the highest point in the city of Boston.

== History ==
The use of parcels of undeveloped land around Boston for a system of interconnected parks were conceived by landscape architect Charles Eliot, who had apprenticed with Frederick Law Olmsted and later assumed leadership of Olmsted's design firm in 1893. Eliot was instrumental in the founding of The Trustees of Reservations and the public Metropolitan Parks Commission in the 1890s and envisioned an expansion of the parks network to areas surrounding Boston. The first five areas acquired by the Metropolitan Park Commission for this system in 1893 were the Beaver Brook, Blue Hills, Hemlock Gorge, Middlesex Fells and Stony Brook Reservations.

== Activities and amenities ==
Recreational facilities at the park include hiking and biking trails, fishing at Turtle Pond, athletic fields, tennis courts, an ice skating rink, and a swimming pool.
