= Park Circle Water Tower =

- Arlington Reservoir (Standpipe)
- U.S. National Register of Historic Places
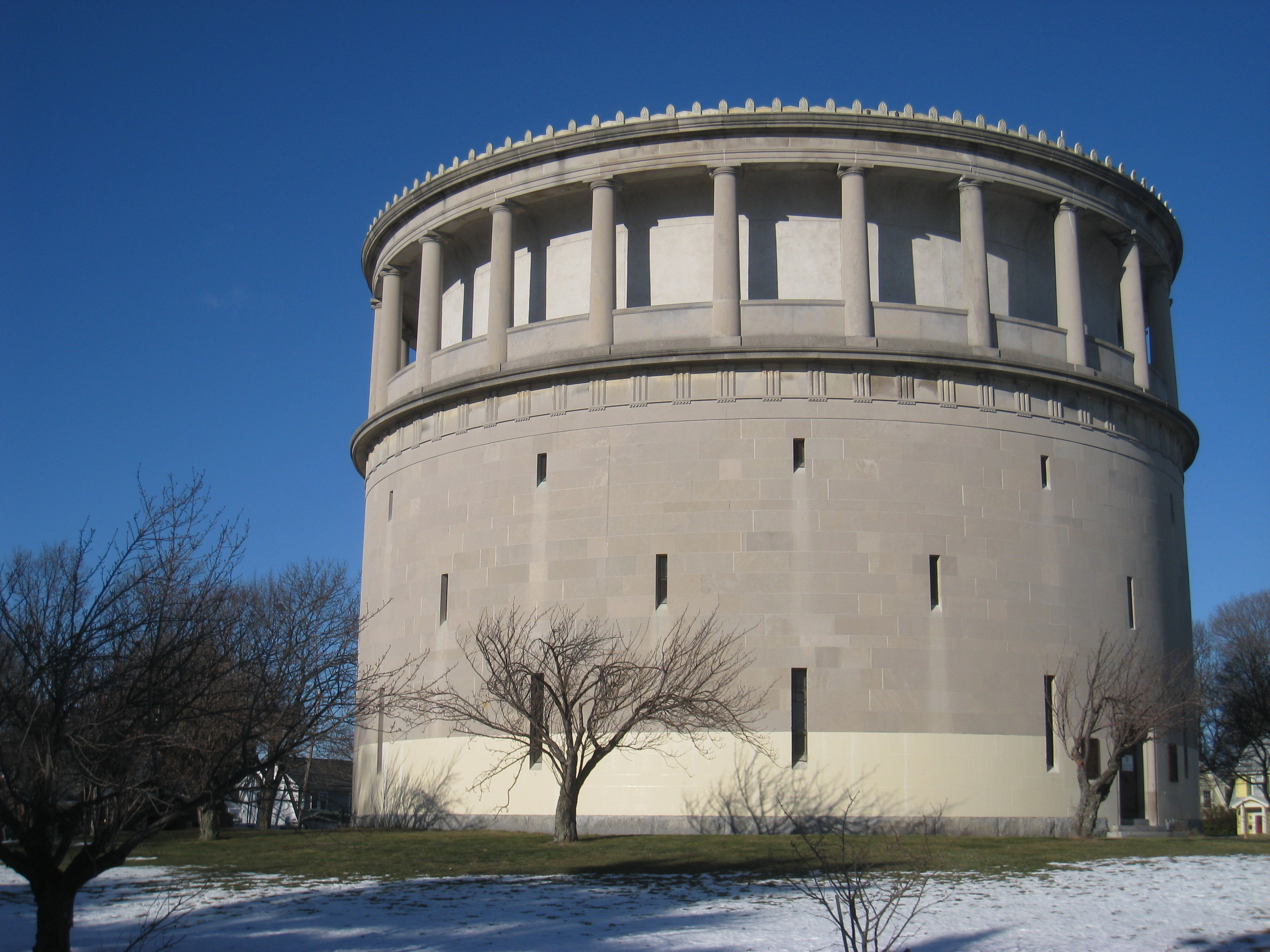

- Location within Massachusetts Location within the United States
- Location: Arlington, Massachusetts
- Coordinates: 42°24′53″N 71°10′49″W
- Built: 1920s
- Architect: Frederick F. Low
- Architectural style: Classical Revival
- MPS: Arlington MRA
- NRHP reference No.: 85002676
- Added to NRHP: September 27, 1985

The Park Circle Water Tower is a large water storage tank located on Park Circle in Arlington, Massachusetts. It was constructed by the Metropolitan Water Works (now MWRA) between 1921 and 1924 in the Classical Revival style, to provide water storage for Northern Extra-High Service area, consisting of Lexington and the higher elevations of Belmont and Arlington. It stands at 377 feet (114.9 meters) above sea level.

It was added to the National Register of Historic Places in 1985 under its historical name Arlington Reservoir, now coincidentally shared with the recreational area a mile to the tower's northwest.

== History ==
In 1895, the Town of Arlington constructed a 550,000 gallon standpipe at this location. However, after Arlington joined the Metropolitan Water District in 1899, the tank soon proved to be inadequate to supply other nearby towns, and was only used to regulate water pressure in the area. The current 2,000,000 gallon tank, contained within a stone rotunda, was built between 1921 and 1924 by Crane Construction Company, with William E. Foss as chief engineer.

The water tower was designed by Frederic E. Low, of Arlington, and its construction was funded by the Robbins sisters, also of Arlington. The design was inspired by elements of Greek Doric style, "but the tower is not an enlarged replica of any specific round temple of the ancient world".

== In the Community ==
On September 7, 2014, Luminarium Dance Company created a community arts event celebrating 90 years since the tower's completion. Roughly 300 locals attended the event entitled "Night at the Tower," showcasing a live dance performance on the lawn combined with colossal video projections on the tower. This was the first event of its kind to be held at there, and included 75 Arlington-inspired images created by local youth and adults over the past decade by the Arlington Center for the Arts. "Night at the Tower" was created and led by Luminarium Artistic Director and Arlington local Merli V. Guerra and was supported in part by a grant from the Arlington Cultural Council, a local agency, which is supported by the Massachusetts Cultural Council, a state agency.

== See also ==
- Bellevue Standpipe
- Chestnut Hill Reservoir Historic District
- Forbes Hill Standpipe
- National Register of Historic Places listings in Arlington, Massachusetts
