= Bellevue Standpipe =

- U.S. National Register of Historic Places
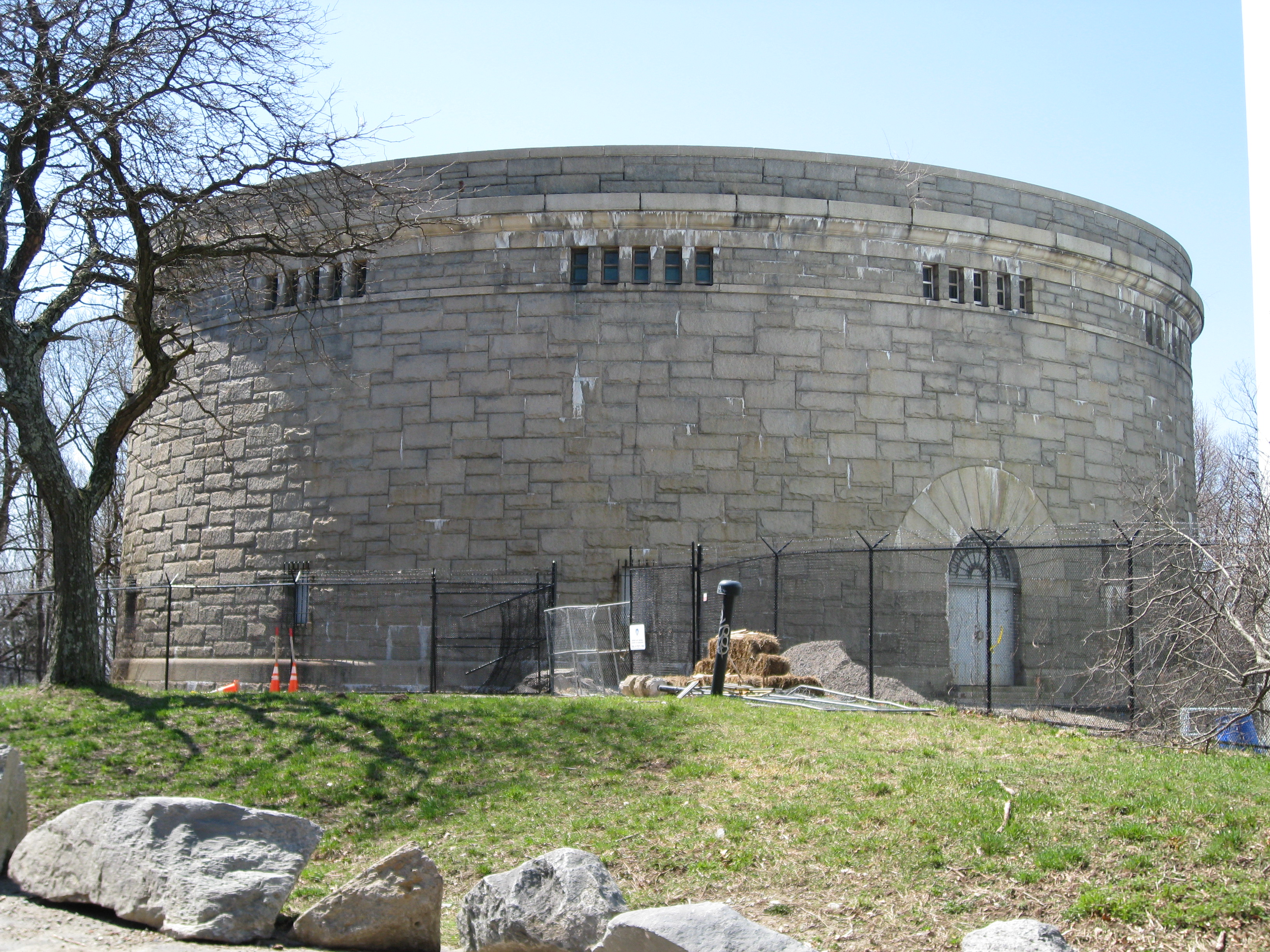
- Bellevue Standpipe

- Location within Massachusetts Location within the United States
- Location: Bellevue Hill, Boston, Massachusetts
- Coordinates: 42°16′31″N 71°8′40″W
- Area: 2 acres (0.81 ha)
- Built: 1914
- MPS: Water Supply System of Metropolitan Boston MPS
- NRHP reference No.: 89002251
- Added to NRHP: January 18, 1990

Bellevue Standpipe is a historic water storage tank on Bellevue Hill at Washington Street and West Roxbury Parkway in the Stony Brook Reservation of Boston, Massachusetts. Built in 1914, it is one of three early 20th-century water tanks built as part of Greater Boston's public water supply. The structure was added to the National Register of Historic Places in 1990.

== Description and history ==
Bellevue Standpipe is located in Bellevue Hill Park, at the northern tip of the Stony Brook Reservation. Bellevue Hill is, at 330 feet (100 m), the highest point in the city of Boston. The standpipe is built out of poured concrete faced in rough-cut granite, and measures 114 feet (35 m) in height and 47 feet (14 m) in diameter. Inside the structure is a steel tank 100 feet (30 m) high and 44 feet 3 inches (13.49 m) in diameter.

The standpipe was built by the Metropolitan Water and Sewerage Board (predecessor to today's MWRA) in 1914 as part of the Southern Extra High Service Area. It replaced a smaller standpipe built in 1888. Its construction was overseen by Dexter Brackett, the water board's chief engineer, and the tank was provided by the Holyoke Steam Boiler Works; they also provided the tank for the Arlington Reservoir (Arlington, Massachusetts), built about the same time.

The standpipe received water from the Fisher Hill Reservoir in Brookline via a 20-inch (51 cm) main, delivered via a pumping station in Hyde Park. A second water storage tank was added at this location in 1955-56. The older tank is currently operated as a standby to the newer one.

== See also ==
- Arlington Reservoir (Arlington, Massachusetts)
- Chestnut Hill Reservoir Historic District
- Forbes Hill Standpipe
- National Register of Historic Places listings in southern Boston, Massachusetts
