= Berj Zamkochian =

- Born: April 20, 1929; Boston, Massachusetts, U.S.
- Died: February 23, 2004 (aged 74) Boston, Massachusetts, U.S.
- Instrument: Organ

Berj Zamkochian (April 20, 1929, in Boston – February 23, 2004, in Boston) was an Armenian-American organist.

== Biography ==
He studied at the New England Conservatory of Music and eventually joined the faculty. In 1957, at the age of 27, he was appointed organist of the Boston Symphony Orchestra and Boston Pops Orchestra. His recordings of Saint-Saëns' Organ Symphony and Poulenc's Organ Concerto with Charles Münch and the Boston Symphony Orchestra are regarded as classics. He performed for six American presidents, the Pope, the British royal family and the imperial family of Japan. Zamkochian also founded the Gomidas Organ fund, which donates organs to Armenia and Armenian churches in various parts of the world. He also performed at the funeral service for John F. Kennedy. He was a National Patron of Delta Omicron, an international professional music fraternity.
