= Bellevue station (MBTA) =

Railway station in West Roxbury, MA

Bellevue
- A train at Bellevue station in 2025

General information
- Location: 35 Colbert Street; West Roxbury, Boston, Massachusetts
- Coordinates: 42.2866°N 71.1456°W
- Line: Needham Branch (West Roxbury Branch)
- Platforms: 1 side platform
- Tracks: 1
- Connections: MBTA bus: 35, 36, 37, 38

Construction
- Parking: 37 spaces ($4.00 fee)
- Cycle facilities: 8
- Accessible: Yes

Other information
- Fare zone: 1

History
- Opened: July 14, 1849

Passengers
- 2024: 319 daily boardings

Services
Preceding station	MBTA	Following station
Highland toward Needham Heights	Needham Line	Roslindale Village toward South Station
Former services
Preceding station	MBTA	Following station
Highland toward Millis	Millis Branch Closed 1967	Roslindale Village toward South Station
Preceding station	New York, New Haven and Hartford Railroad	Following station
Highland toward Woonsocket	Charles River Line	Roslindale Village toward Boston
Location

Bellevue station is an MBTA Commuter Rail station in West Roxbury, Massachusetts. Located in the Bellevue neighborhood, it serves the Needham Line. The station has a mini-high platform for accessibility.

The Boston and Providence Railroad opened its West Roxbury Branch from Tollgate to Dedham on July 14, 1849, with Central (later called Bellevue) one of three intermediate stops. A new station building was constructed around 1891.
