= Boston City Archives =

Repository of historical records of Boston, Massachusetts

Coordinates: 42.27889°N 71.18033°W

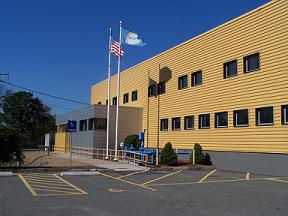
Boston City Archives building in West Roxbury, MA.

The Boston City Archives are located in West Roxbury, MA, and are the repository for all official records that must be kept to honor both the history of the municipal government in Boston and the legal rights of its citizens. The City Archives were established in 1988. The collection was originally housed in an old school building in Hyde Park, until the importance of preserving the expanding number of records became a focus of attention.

== Collections ==
The City Archives holds records for over 60 current and historic government entities and departments. The bulk of these records consist of documentation of the history of Boston since incorporation as a city in 1822, although some records go back to the early 17th century. It is only recently that many city departments have begun to give their records to the archives, so the collection is constantly growing. This is aided by the movement of the collections to the new facility in West Roxbury. Prior to this move, the Heritage Health Index Report had found that the resources and facilities at the Hyde Park facilities had been lacking.

Most notably, the collections include:

- Records relating to immigration and poverty at the time of the Irish Famine
- Documentation of Boston’s role in the American Civil War
- Boston Public Schools Desegregation-Era Records (assisted by a grant from the NHPRC and the city's largest department, Boston Public Schools)
- City Council Records
- Transit Department Records
- City Tax and Treasury Records
