= Patrick DeCoste =

American musician

Patrick DeCoste (born July 22, 1978, in Boston, Massachusetts) is an American rock guitarist.

== Biography ==
Patrick DeCoste (pronounced: "dē-coast") began playing guitar at the age of 13 at a local music store in West Roxbury, MA. He went on to study at the Boston Conservatory of Music's Summer Sessions (1992), the Berklee College of Music's 5 Week Summer Program and Summer Guitar Sessions (1994–1995). He was also awarded full-tuition scholarships to attend Berklee College of Music's Boston City Music Program (1994–1996). While at Berklee, he studied under the direction of Tomo Fujita.

Since 2003, DeCoste has performed as an instrumental guitarist, releasing 2 CDs. His 2003 Advanced Demo CD dominated the MP3.com charts and is credited with establishing his name within the instrumental guitar community. In 2004, DeCoste released Inside The Unsaid which debuted at No. 3 alongside Grammy winners Eric Johnson & Steve Morse. Music from this CD has been featured at major sporting events, such as the now-defunct San Diego Gulls, as well as various radio shows including Q's House and PBS 106.7FM's weekly show: FretNet. DeCoste is currently endorsed by Ernie Ball Music Man guitars, alongside Steve Lukather, Albert Lee and John Petrucci.

== Performance ==
DeCoste's famed version of the Star Spangled Banner from his 2003 Advanced Demo has been performed live at various major Sports arenas such as Shea Stadium, the Agganis Arena & the DCU Center and can be found on YouTube.

He has recorded/ shared the stage with the following artists: Gary Hoey (Surdog Records), Johnny A (Favored Nations), Joe Stump (Leviathan Records), Jon Finn (Legato Records), Lori McKenna (Warner Bros. Nashville), Nate Morton (CBS Rockstar: INXS drummer), Ed Toth (Vertical Horizon/ Doobie Bros) & Chris Loftlin (Brian Mcknight Bassist)

== Discography ==
- 2003 Advanced Demo CD (2003)
1. Love In Misery
2. Premonition
3. The New Millennium
4. Breaking The Silence
5. The Star Spangled Banner
6. Greasy Fingers (bonus track)
- Inside The Unsaid (2004)
1. Above The Beyond
2. Breaking The Silence
3. The New Millennium
4. In Step
5. Premonition
6. Love In Misery
7. Greasy Fingers
8. Home
9. Floydian Theory
- 2008 Advanced EP (release date: 2008)
1. Hello World
2. Mark Twain
3. Saudade
4. Love In Misery (alt. version)
5. San Jacinto
6. Untitled Track (video)
