= William Martin (novelist) =

American author of historical novels

- Born: Boston, Massachusetts, U.S.
- Education: Harvard University; University of Southern California
- Occupation: Author
- Children: 3
- Website: www.williammartinbooks.com/index.htm

William Martin is an American author of historical novels, a native of Boston, Massachusetts.

== Biography ==
William Martin grew up in West Roxbury and Roslindale, Massachusetts, and graduated from Harvard University in 1972 where he majored in English. He worked as an historical research assistant and directed theater in the evening.

He went into construction to raise money to move to Hollywood and then studied motion pictures at the University of Southern California.

Martin wrote two screenplays in an effort to get into the writing business. Producers and his agent suggested that, to best take advantage of his writing style, Martin should write a novel. Based on the outline of his first novel, Martin obtained a $7,500 publishing deal. The book, Back Bay, was published in 1979 and reached The New York Times Best Seller list.

William Martin has continued to write historical novels and currently lives in Weston, Massachusetts (near Boston) with his wife, two sons and a daughter.

== Bibliography ==
=== Peter Fallon series ===
- Back Bay (1979)
- Harvard Yard (2003), Grand Central Publishing (December 1, 2004), ISBN 978-0-446-61450-4
- The Lost Constitution (2007), Forge Books (June 2008), ISBN 978-0-7653-5446-4
- City of Dreams (2010), Forge Books (May 11, 2010), ISBN 978-0-7653-2197-8
- The Lincoln Letter (2012), Forge Books, ISBN 9780765321985
- Bound for Gold (2019), Forge Books, ISBN 9780765384218

=== Other novels ===
- Nerve Endings (1984)
- The Rising of the Moon (1987)
- Cape Cod (1991)
- Annapolis (1996)
- Citizen Washington (1999)
- December '41 (2022)

== Awards ==
- 2005 New England Book Award
