= Mike Rush =

American politician

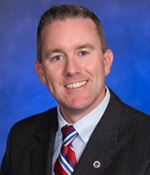

Member of the Massachusetts Senate
- Incumbent
- Assumed office January 5, 2011
- Preceded by: Marian Walsh
- Succeeded by: Persis Yu
- Constituency: Suffolk and Norfolk (2011–2013); Norfolk and Suffolk (2013–present)

Member of the Massachusetts House of Representatives from the 10th Suffolk district
- In office 2002 – January 5, 2011
- Preceded by: David T. Donnelly
- Succeeded by: Edward F. Coppinger

Personal details
- Born: November 30, 1973 (age 52) Boston, Massachusetts, U.S.
- Party: Democratic
- Spouse: Mary
- Children: 3
- Education: Providence College (BA, MA); Southern New England School of Law (JD)

Michael F. Rush is a Democratic member of the Massachusetts Senate, representing the Suffolk and Norfolk district. This includes Boston, ward 18, precincts 7 to 20, inclusive, 22 and 23, ward 19, precincts 10 to 13, inclusive, and ward 20, in the county of Suffolk; and Dedham, Norwood, Westwood, and Walpole in the county of Norfolk.

He previously served in the Massachusetts House of Representatives, representing the 10th Suffolk District from 2002 to 2010.

== Background ==
Prior to being elected to the state legislature, Rush was a history teacher at his alma mater, Catholic Memorial High School in West Roxbury. He also taught at the Newman School in Boston's Back Bay.

Rush is a Commander in the United States Navy, where for the past thirteen years he has served in the Reserve component following his active duty training. He is currently assigned to NATO Deploy Charlie and was formally assigned to the Joint Central Command. Prior to serving as a commissioned officer, Rush traveled both home and abroad on peacetime construction projects as an enlisted sailor with Naval Mobile Construction Battalion 27, better known as the Seabees.

== Education ==
Rush holds a JD from Southern New England School of Law as well as a Master of Arts degree with distinction in United States History and a Bachelor of Arts degree with a double major in history and political science from Providence College. He is also a member of Phi Alpha Theta, the International Honor Society for Historians.

Rush was the president of his high school class at Catholic Memorial High School and college class at Providence. He also attained the rank of Eagle Scout in the Boy Scouts of America.

== Career as a legislator ==
In the 2009–2010 Legislative session, House Speaker Robert DeLeo appointed Rush to serve on the House Committee on Ways and Means, the Joint Committee on Natural Resources and the Environment, and the Joint Committee on Labor and Workforce Development. Previously, he had served on the Joint Committees of Judiciary, Revenue, Public Service, Public Safety and Homeland Security.

Rush also served as the House Historian, having been appointed to the position by former Speaker Thomas Finneran, as well as the Senate Majority Whip, a position he currently holds.

== State Senate ==
=== Veterans ===
Senator Rush was the main sponsor of the Veterans' tax credit added to the FY18 Budget. The tax credit provides up to $2,000 for each veterans hired to businesses with fewer than 100 employees who participate in a veterans hiring certification program at the Department of Veterans' Services. The tax credit also requires the department to develop a comprehensive program to improve employment opportunities and outcomes among veterans by providing guidance to businesses in attracting, hiring, training, and retraining veterans.

Rush led the movement to pass S.2509, An Act relative to veterans' benefits, rights, appreciation, validation and enforcement (also known as the BRAVE Act). Among other things, this bill provides paid military leave for state employees called to duty by the armed forces for up to 40 days for training and operation purposes. It also increases the burial expense funds paid by the Commonwealth from $2,000 to $4,000 for indigent veterans. The bill was signed by Governor Charlie Baker and was included in Chapter 218 of the Acts of 2018.

== See also ==
- 2019–2020 Massachusetts legislature
- 2021–2022 Massachusetts legislature
