= Bellevue Hill, Boston =

Coordinates: 42°16′32.77″N 71°8′37.67″W

Bellevue Hill is a neighborhood in West Roxbury comprising the areas roughly between Lagrange Street, Centre Street, and the West Roxbury Parkway. Defined by its leafy streets and stately homes, Bellevue Hill is one of the most upscale neighborhoods outside of Boston's downtown core. Bellevue Hill is also the highest natural point in the city of Boston and Suffolk County. It rises to a height of 330 feet (101m) above sea level.

On it lies the Bellevue Standpipe, which is on the Boston Register of Historic Places.
