= Medfield Junction station =

Medfield
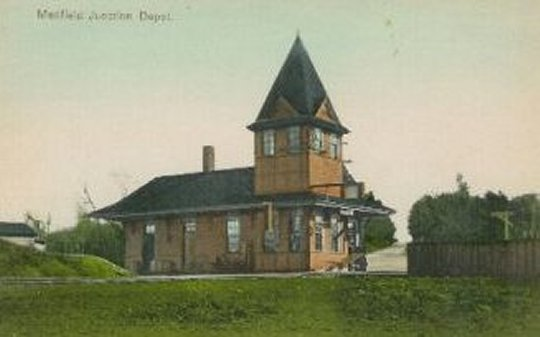
- Medfield Junction station on a 1906 postcard

General information
- Location: West Mill Street at Adams Street; Medfield, Massachusetts
- Coordinates: 42°11′52.8″N 71°19′33.6″W
- Owner: New York, New Haven and Hartford Railroad
- Lines: Millis Branch; Framingham Secondary

History
- Opened: November 18, 1861
- Closed: April 21, 1967

Services
Preceding station	MBTA	Following station
Clicquot toward Millis	Millis Branch	Farm Street toward South Station
Former services
Preceding station	New York, New Haven and Hartford Railroad	Following station
Clicquot toward Woonsocket	Charles River Line	Farm Street toward Boston
Location

Medfield Junction is a railway junction and former train station located in northwest Medfield, Massachusetts. It is the junction of the Framingham Secondary and the former Millis Branch. The station was open from November 1861 until April 1967.

== History ==
=== Medfield Junction station ===
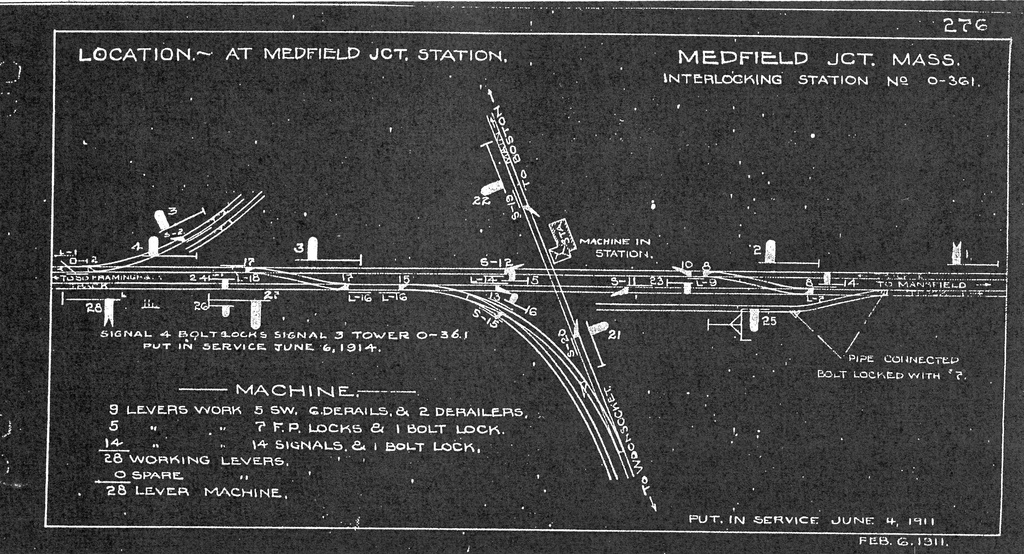
1911 diagram of Medfield Junction

On November 18, 1861, the Charles River Railroad (part of the New York and Boston Railroad) was extended from Needham Center to Medway via Medfield; a station at Medfield opened then or shortly after. In 1867, the Mansfield and Framingham Railroad opened on a perpendicular route, crossing the Charles River line at Medfield Junction and opening its own station closer to the center of Mansfield.

In 1882, the state legislature allowed the installation of automatic signals when different railroads crossed at grade. Since 1855, trains had been required to stop at such crossings. Signals were installed at Medfield Junction in 1885.

By 1898, both lines through Medfield Junction were owned by the New York, New Haven and Hartford Railroad. Patients traveling to Medfield State Hospital were transported from the station in horse-drawn wagons. A freight wreck at the junction on October 23, caused by an engineer proceeding through an open derail, killed two railroad employees and injured four more.

=== Closure ===
Passenger service between Mansfield and Framingham ended in 1933, and Medfield Junction (often referred to thereafter as simply Medfield) was once again the sole railroad station for the town.

Passenger service on the Charles River line was cut back from Woonsocket to Bellingham Junction in 1930, and discontinued entirely south of Needham Junction on July 18, 1938. Service south of Needham Junction was restored in March 1940, but cut back in stages to West Medway later in 1940 and 1941 (after which the line was known as the "West Medway Branch"), and reduced to a single daily one-car round trip (which was combined with a longer Needham Heights train at Needham Junction) in 1955. The newly formed Massachusetts Bay Transportation Authority (MBTA) started subsidising continued NYNH&H passenger service on the portion of the moribund West Medway branch running from Boston to Millis on April 24, 1966; service on the truncated Millis Branch was discontinued on April 21, 1967 due to extremely poor ridership. The remaining stations, including Medfield, closed at that time; all except Dover and Millis were later demolished.

=== Current use ===
The Framingham Secondary passed through Conrail, CSX, and finally into state hands in 2015; CSX runs regular freight service on the line through Medfield Junction. The Bay Colony Railroad took over freight service on the former Millis Branch east of the junction from Conrail in 1982, and west of the junction in 1987. As of 2015, the only Bay Colony service through the Junction is occasional gravel trains towards Millis.
