= Roslindale Village station =

MBTA Commuter Rail station

Roslindale Village
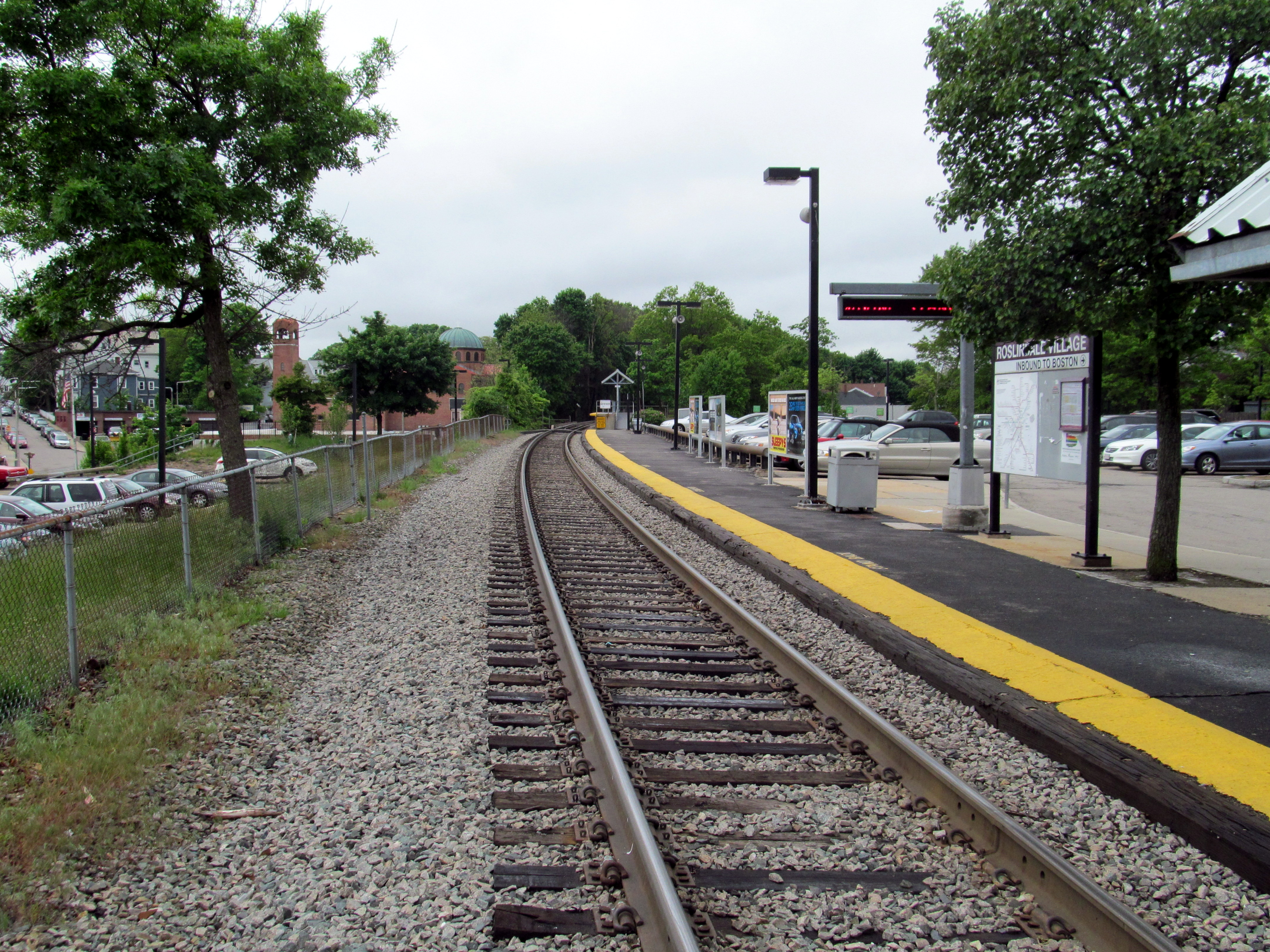
- Roslindale Village station in May 2012

General information
- Location: 1 Belgrade Avenue; Roslindale, Boston, Massachusetts
- Coordinates: 42.2874°N 71.1304°W
- Line: Needham Branch (West Roxbury Branch)
- Platforms: 1 side platform
- Tracks: 1
- Connections: MBTA bus: 14, 30, 34, 34E, 35, 36, 37, 40, 50, 51

Construction
- Parking: 144 spaces
- Accessible: Yes

Other information
- Fare zone: 1

History
- Opened: July 14, 1849

Passengers
- 2024: 517 daily boardings

Services
Preceding station	MBTA	Following station
Bellevue toward Needham Heights	Needham Line	Forest Hills toward South Station
Former services
Preceding station	MBTA	Following station
Bellevue toward Millis	Millis Branch Closed 1967	Back Bay toward South Station
Preceding station	New York, New Haven and Hartford Railroad	Following station
Bellevue toward Woonsocket	Charles River Line	Boston Back Bay toward Boston
Location

Roslindale Village station is an MBTA Commuter Rail station on the Needham Line, located in the Roslindale Square business district of the Roslindale neighborhood in Boston, Massachusetts. The station has a single side platform serving the line's single track, with a mini-high platform for accessibility.

Roslindale Square is an important bus transfer location; ten MBTA bus routes (14, 30, 34, 34E, 35, 36, 37, 40, 50, and 51) run on Washington Street between Forest Hills and Roslindale, then fan out to the south and west.

== History ==
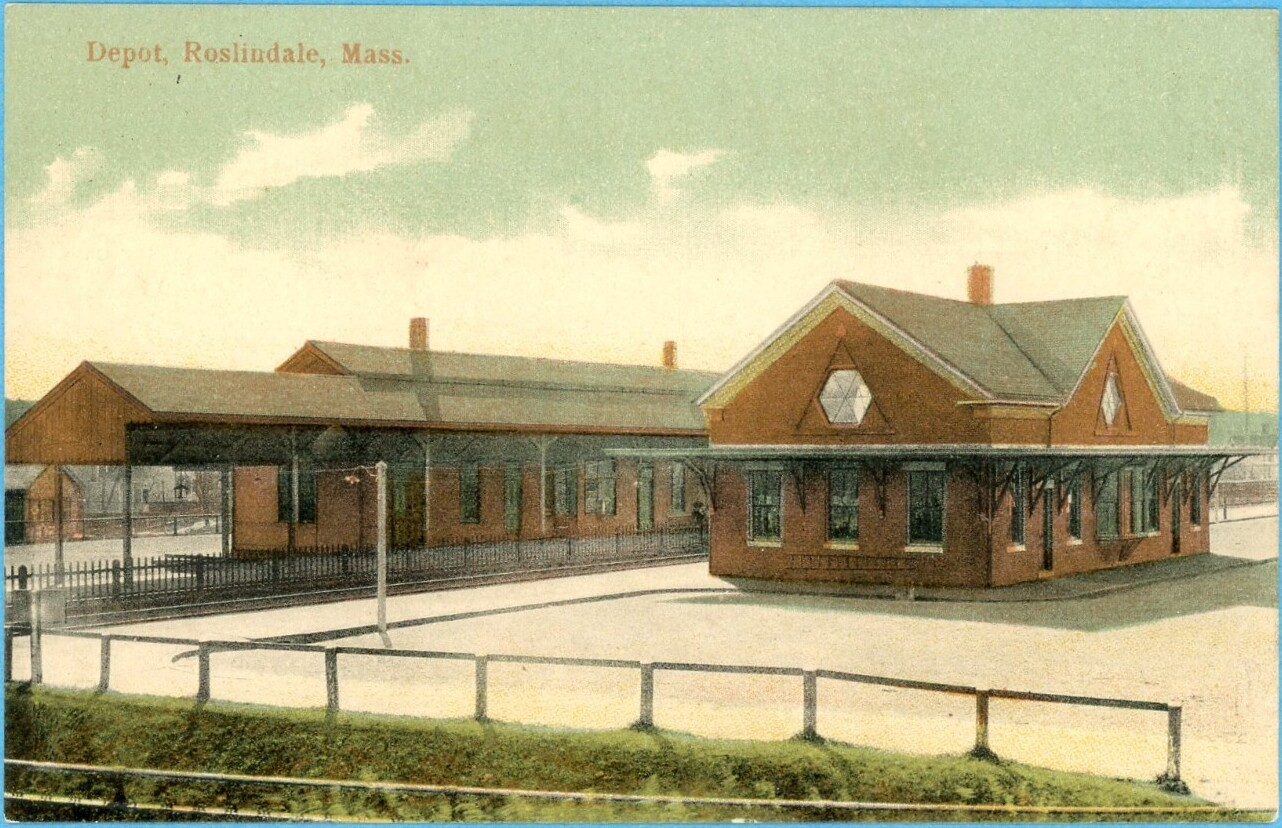
An early-20th-century postcard of the station

The Boston and Providence Railroad (B&P) opened its West Roxbury Branch from Forest Hills to Dedham via West Roxbury on July 14, 1849. Stations at South Street (later Roslindale), Central (Bellevue), and West Roxbury all opened with the branch. A new brick station building was constructed in 1876.

A grade crossing elimination project in the late 1890s raised the tracks above grade. A rail bridge was built over Roberts Street, while South Street was cut at the tracks, with only a pedestrian underpass. The 1898-built bridge over Roberts Street was replaced with a modern bridge in June 2021. The new bridge was designed to allow construction of a parallel span should a second track be later added.
