= Needham Line =

MBTA Commuter Rail line

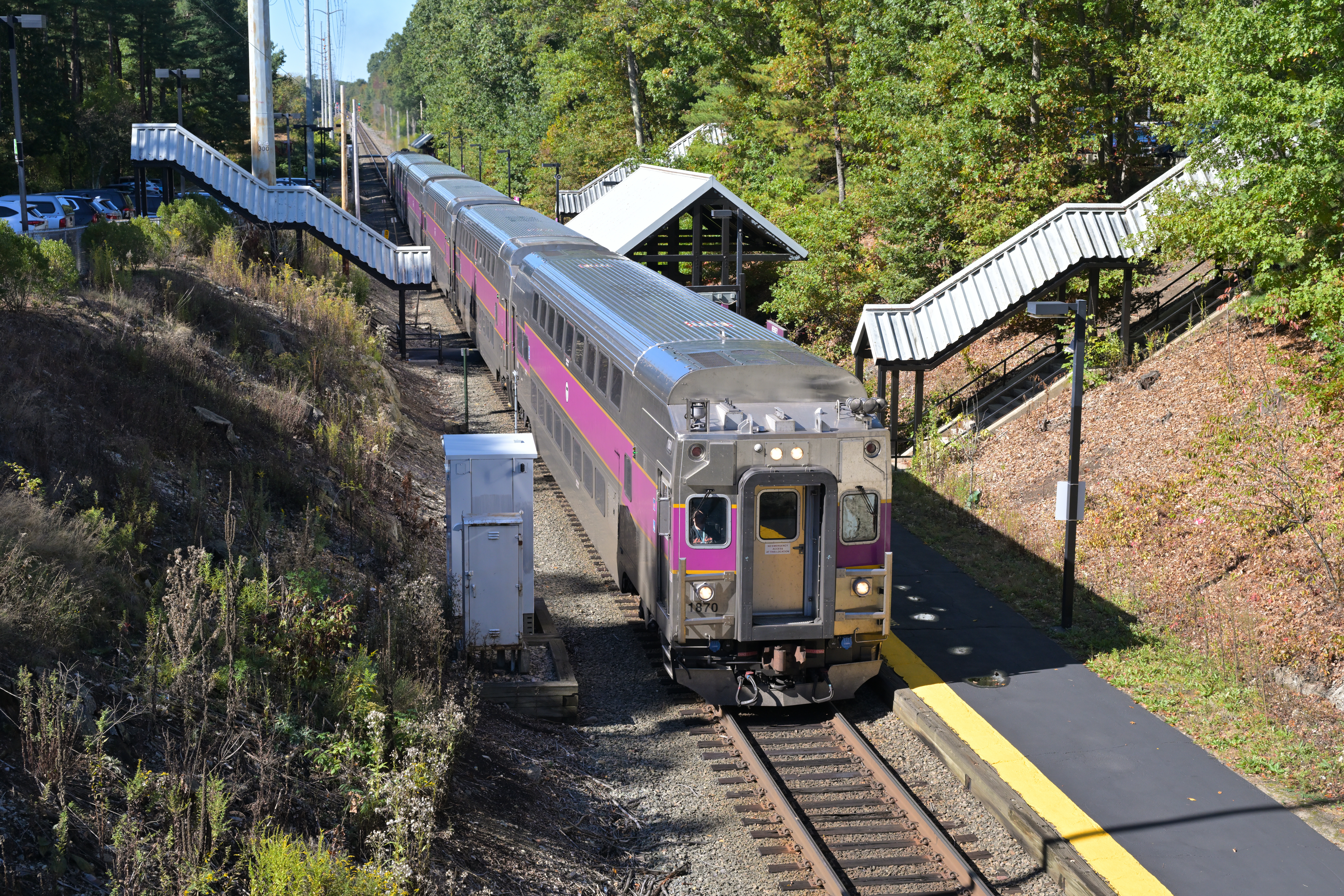
- An inbound Needham Line train at Hersey station in 2025

Overview
- Owner: MBTA
- Locale: Greater Boston
- Termini: Needham Heights; South Station
- Stations: 12

Service
- Type: Commuter rail
- System: MBTA Commuter Rail
- Train number(s): 6001-6434 (weekdays); 6801-6816 (weekends)
- Operator: Keolis North America
- Daily ridership: 6,064 (2024)

Technical
- Line length: 13.7 miles (22.0 km)
- Track gauge: 4 ft 8 1/2 in (1,435 mm)

The Needham Line is a branch of the MBTA Commuter Rail system, running west from downtown Boston, Massachusetts through Roxbury, Jamaica Plain, Roslindale, West Roxbury, and the town of Needham. The second-shortest line of the system at just 13.7 miles (22.0 km) long, it carried 6,064 daily riders in Fall 2024. Unlike the MBTA's eleven other commuter rail lines, the Needham Line is not a former intercity mainline; instead, it is composed of a former branch line, a short segment of one intercity line (running in the reverse of its original direction), and a 1906-built connector.

== History ==
=== West Roxbury Branch ===
The Boston and Providence Railroad (B&P) opened its main line from Boston through Toll Gate (Forest Hills) to Providence in 1834. The West Roxbury Branch from Forest Hills to Dedham via West Roxbury was opened on July 14, 1849, by the B&P. South Street (Roslindale), Central (Bellevue), and West Roxbury all opened with the branch; Highland was added around 1855.

=== Charles River Branch Railroad ===
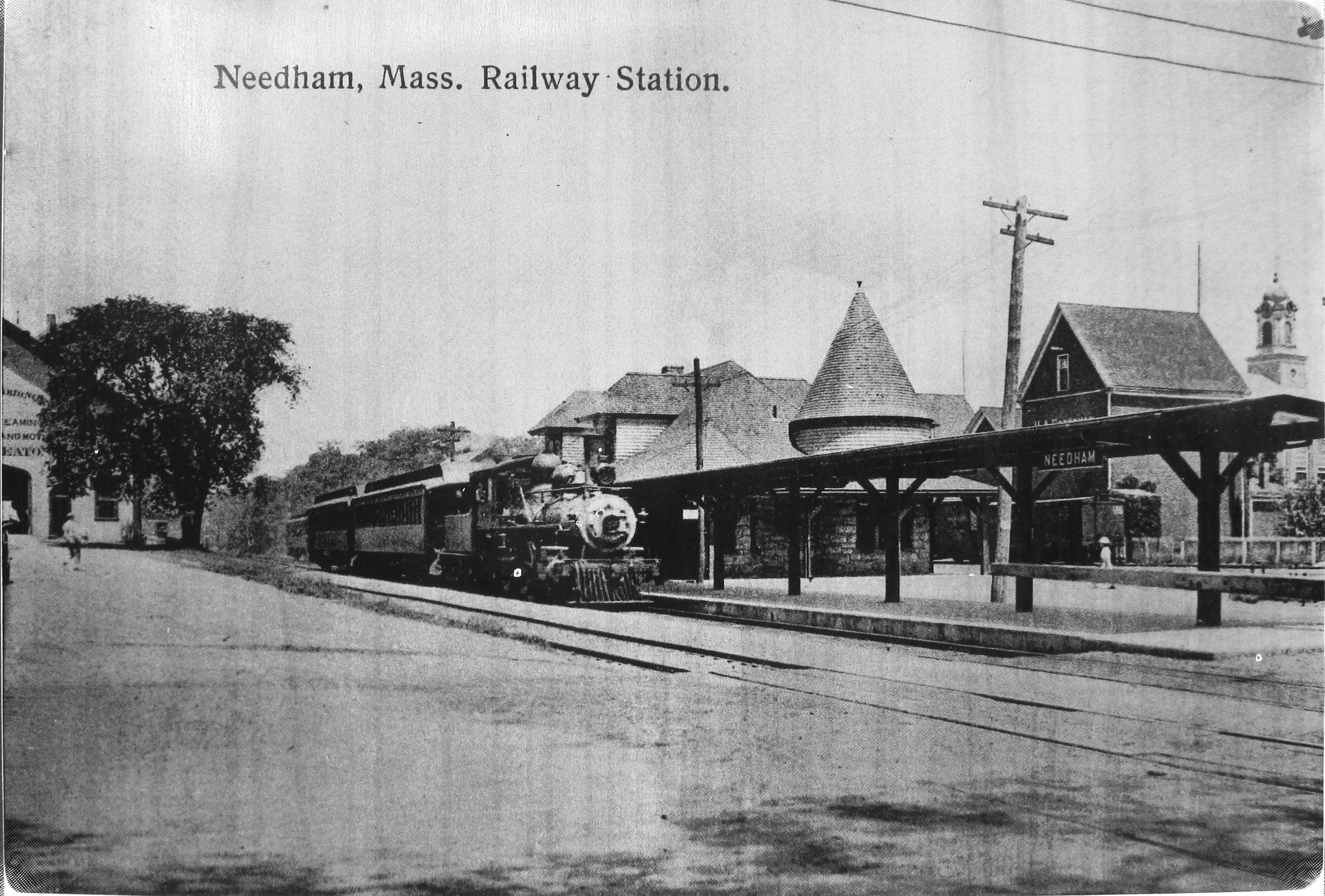
Needham Center station in 1904

On June 1, 1853, the Charles River Branch Railroad was extended from Newton Upper Falls into Needham as the first stage of a line to Dover and beyond. The railroad was not able to follow its original plan to go through the East Village, Needham's historical center, because one landowner refused to sell; instead, it was routed to Great Plain station in Great Plain Village further to the east. Highlandville (later Needham Heights) opened around 1860. The line was used to haul gravel from Needham quarries to fill in the Back Bay from 1859 to the 1880s. The line was extended southwest to Medway in 1861 and to Woonsocket in 1863. In 1886, the Boston and Albany Railroad extended the original Charles River Branch Railroad line from Cook Junction to its own main line at Riverside, forming the complete Highland branch.

=== Needham cutoff ===
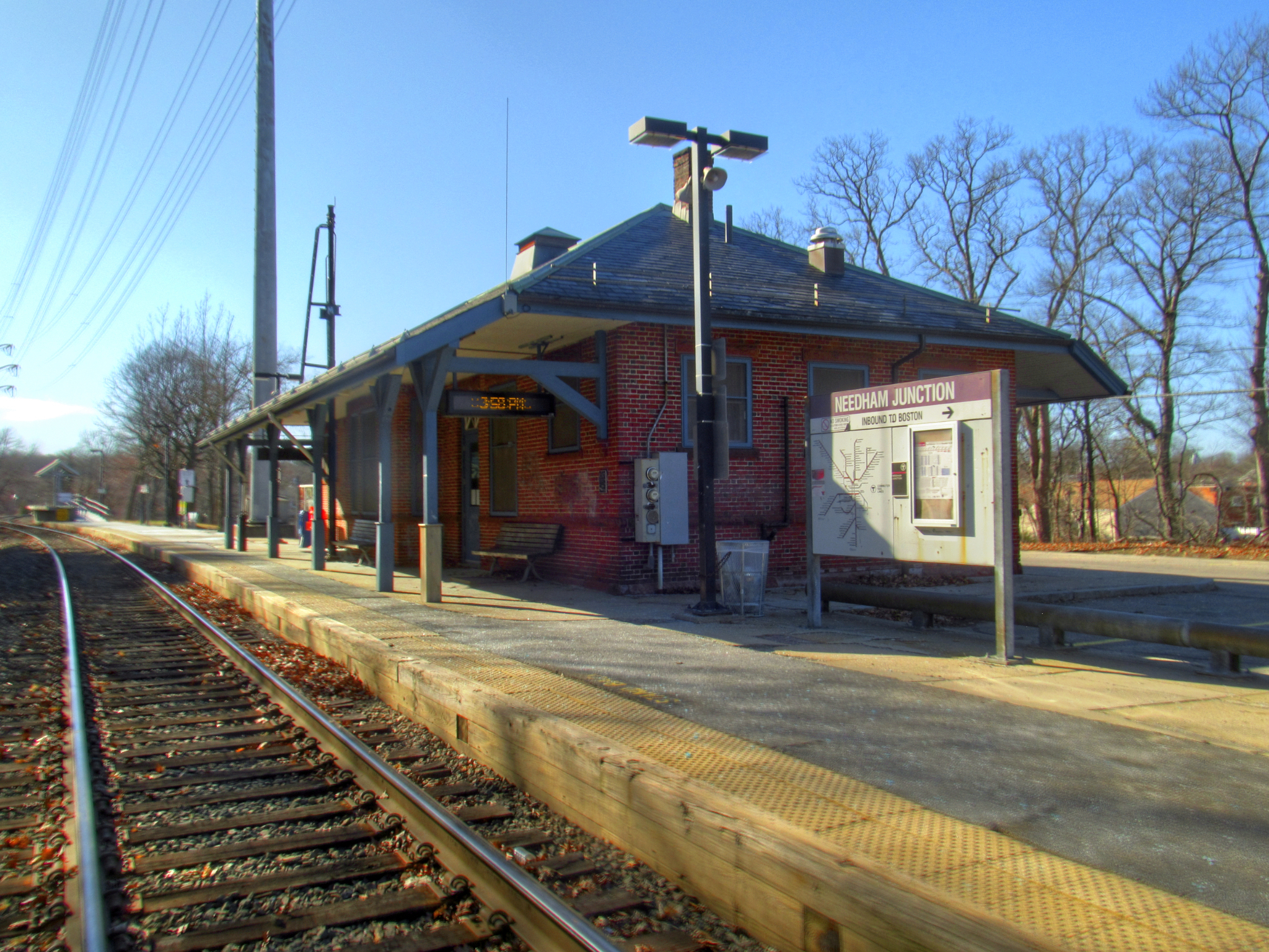
Needham Junction station, built in 1906

The Needham cutoff opened on November 4, 1906, from West Roxbury to Needham Junction, allowing trains from the former New York and New England Railroad to reach Boston without needing to use the Highland branch. Building the cutoff required a significant length of difficult rock cuts – "one of the heaviest pieces of short railroad construction ever attempted in New England" – reaching a depth of 57 feet (17 m) at Great Plain Avenue. Originally Needham Junction was the only stop on the cutoff; Bird's Hill (now Hersey) opened as an infill station in 1917.

The segment from West Roxbury to Dedham was subsequently abandoned; the segment from Needham Junction to Cook Junction saw reduced passenger service. Loop service jointly run by the B&A and the New Haven operated over the cutoff and the Highland branch via Needham from 1911 to 1914; after that, most Needham trains originated at Needham Heights or Newton Highlands. Service between Newton Highlands and Newton Upper Falls ended in 1927, and between Needham Heights and Newton Upper Falls in 1932, leaving Needham Heights as the terminus of the line.

Spring Street station on the line to Dedham was closed on July 18, 1938, as part of the 88 stations case. West Roxbury–Dedham service ended effective May 6, 1940.

=== MBTA era ===
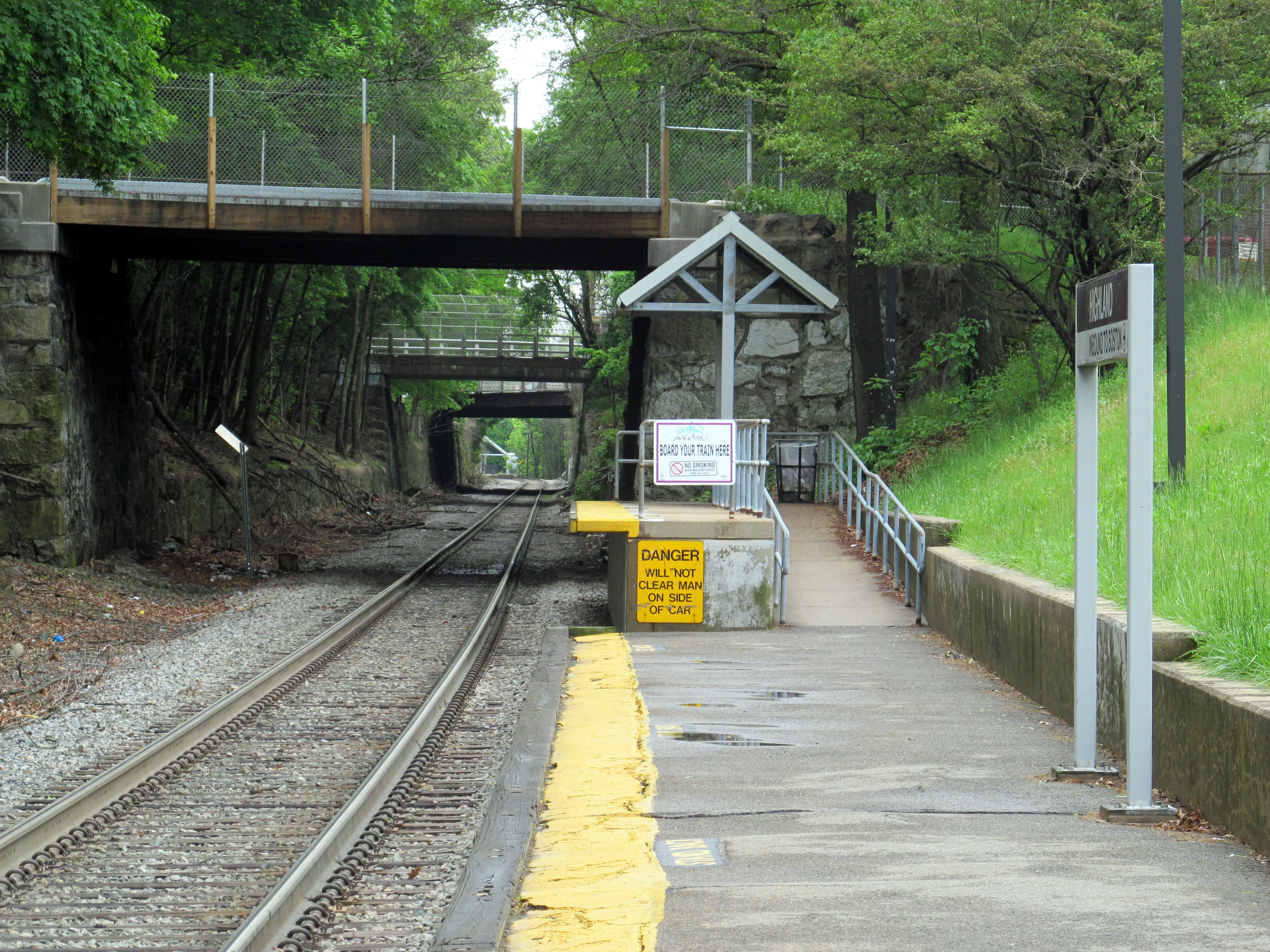
Highland station in 2012 with its 1980s-built mini-high platform

The West Medway branch shared the line from Forest Hills to Needham Junction until 1938 and from 1940 to 1955; from 1955 to 1967, the line operated as a shuttle from West Medway (Millis after April 1966) to Needham Junction, with the single Budd RDC used for the shuttle being coupled to a Needham Heights train for the remainder of the journey to South Station. On April 11, 1966, a two-car inbound train from Needham derailed at Gardner Street in West Roxbury, injuring 61 aboard, due to a tampered switch. The remaining line was purchased by the MBTA from Penn Central on January 27, 1973, along with most of the other southside lines. The stop at Forest Hills, not used since 1940 as the adjacent Washington Street Elevated provided more frequent service, was reopened on June 4, 1973.

When the plans to replace the Elevated were drawn up in the 1960s, the new Orange Line was planned to continue past Forest Hills to Needham Heights, replacing the Needham Line. However, as the project was stalled over the next few decades, funding was found only to complete the replacement portion to Forest Hills in 1987, and so the Needham Line was kept as a locomotive-hauled commuter service. During Southwest Corridor construction from 1979 to 1987, the line was closed; upon the initial closure, service levels on the nearby Framingham Line were increased substantially to compensate for the loss of Needham service.

==== Weekend service and COVID-19 changes ====
Since the New Haven era, the line has had Saturday service but not Sunday service. Experimental Sunday service was operated from July 11, 1992, until February 14, 1993, along with other new southside weekend service, some of which was made permanent. As part of systemwide service cuts due to budget shortfalls, Saturday service was eliminated on July 7, 2012. Saturday service on the Needham Line, as well as weekend service on the Greenbush Line and Plymouth/Kingston Line, resumed on December 27, 2014. The line was shut down on weekends in September through November 2017 for the installation of Positive Train Control equipment in order to meet a 2020 federal deadline.

Substantially reduced schedules due to the COVID-19 pandemic were in effect from March 16 to June 23, 2020. These temporary systemwide reductions were put in place again on December 14, 2020. Until 2021, the Needham Line plus some parts of the Providence/Stoughton Line were the only MBTA Commuter Rail routes without Sunday service. On January 23, 2021, reduced schedules went into place with no weekend service on seven lines, including the Needham Line.

Service changes on April 5, 2021, added midday service – thus establishing all-day hourly service – as part of a transition to a regional rail model. As part of that schedule change, all Needham Line trains began stopping at Ruggles station after an additional platform there was completed. Additionally, the final Needham-bound train on weekdays began operating as a shuttle from Forest Hills station, with a transfer there from a Providence/Stoughton Line train.

Weekend service on the Needham Line and the other six lines resumed on July 3, 2021, with both Saturday and Sunday service. In May 2021, the town had considered having weekend service run only between Needham Junction and South Station to avoid train horns in downtown Needham. As of February 2022, the line has 16 round trips on weekdays and 8 on weekends. By October 2022, the line had 4,881 daily riders – 73% of pre-COVID ridership. This increased to 6,064 daily boardings in 2024.

An infill station at the West Roxbury Education Complex was proposed in 2023 as part of plans to move the John D. O'Bryant School of Mathematics & Science to the site. A station at the adjacent Gardner Street Landfill site (now Millennium Park) had previously been proposed in 1970. The school relocation plan was cancelled in February 2024, but the city indicated it would continue planning the new station.

== Station list ==
Fare zone	Location	Miles (km)	Station	Connections and notes
1A	Boston	0.0 (0.0)	South Station	Amtrak: Acela, Lake Shore Limited, Northeast Regional; MBTA Commuter Rail: Fairmount, Fall River/New Bedford, Framingham/Worcester, Franklin/Foxboro, Greenbush, Kingston, and Providence/Stoughton lines; CapeFLYER (seasonal); MBTA subway: Red Line, Silver Line (SL1, SL2, SL3, SL4); MBTA bus: 4, 7, 11; Intercity buses at South Station Bus Terminal
1A	Boston	1.2 (1.9)	Back Bay	Amtrak: Acela, Lake Shore Limited, Northeast Regional; MBTA Commuter Rail: Framingham/Worcester, Franklin/Foxboro, and Providence/Stoughton lines MBTA subway: Orange Line; MBTA bus: 10, 39
1A	Boston	2.2 (3.5)	Ruggles	MBTA Commuter Rail: Franklin/Foxboro and Providence/Stoughton lines MBTA subway: Orange Line; MBTA bus: 8, 15, 19, 22, 23, 28, 43, 44, 45, 47, 65, 85, CT3; Mission Hill Link
1A	Boston	5.0 (8.0)	Forest Hills	MBTA Commuter Rail: Franklin/Foxboro and Providence/Stoughton lines MBTA subway: Orange Line; MBTA bus: 16, 21, 30, 31, 32, 34, 34E, 35, 36, 37, 38, 39, 40, 42, 50, 51
1	Boston	6.4 (10.3)	Roslindale Village	MBTA bus: 14, 30, 34, 34E, 35, 36, 37, 40, 50, 51
1	Boston	7.2 (11.6)	Bellevue	MBTA bus: 35, 36, 37, 38
1	Boston	7.6 (12.2)	Highland	MBTA bus: 35, 36, 37
1	Boston	8.0 (12.9)	West Roxbury	MBTA bus: 35, 36, 37
2	Needham	10.9 (17.5)	Hersey	
2	Needham	12.0 (19.3)	Needham Junction	MBTA bus: 59
2	Needham	12.7 (20.4)	Needham Center	MBTA bus: 59
2	Needham	13.7 (22.0)	Needham Heights	MBTA bus: 59
