= Woonsocket Union Railroad =

The Woonsocket Union Railroad was a railroad in Rhode Island. It was incorporated in Rhode Island in 1850 to build a rail line from the Massachusetts state line near Woonsocket through the towns of Smithfield, Burrillville, and Glocester to the Connecticut state line.

== New York and Boston Railroad ==
In 1853, prior to even being completed, the Woonsocket Union Railroad merged with the New York and Boston Railroad. The line was completed by October 3, 1855, when the Charles River Railroad also merged with the New York and Boston Railroad. The Charles River Railroad was chartered in Massachusetts to build a rail line from Brookline to the Rhode Island border in Bellingham, but had only been built as far as Needham at the time of the merger. In November 1861, the 13-mile section of track from Needham to Medway was finally opened, followed by a 1.3-mile segment from Medway to West Medway in 1862 and the final 9.9-mile segment outlined in the original charter to the Rhode Island state line in Bellingham in October 1863. In order to complete the connection to the rest of its network, the New York and Boston Railroad added a one-mile long stretch of track from Bellingham to the end of its network at the terminus of the former Woonsocket Union Railroad in Woonsocket.

Despite its grand plans and long route, profitability was a challenge for the New York and Boston Railroad, which faced competition from the nearby Medway Branch Railroad and its connection to the larger Norfolk County Railroad. As a result, passenger traffic remained insufficient to keep the railroad in the black, and in 1864 it went bankrupt. The line was leased for 999 years to the Boston, Hartford and Erie Railroad on December 1, 1864, and outright consolidated with it on January 4, 1865. Following the merger, the tracks of the former New York and Boston Railroad became the Woonsocket Division of the Boston, Hartford, and Erie Railroad. Later that year, on December 13, several associates of the much larger Erie Railroad were elected to the board of the Boston, Hartford, and Erie Railroad in an attempt to improve the railroad's profitability, but despite being under partial control of the much larger and more successful railroad, finances continued to be a problem and maintenance and service struggled as a result. Reports of under-powered trains stalling due to a lack of steam abounded, and in 1873 the Boston, Hartford, and Erie Railroad declared bankruptcy. Afterwards, on April 17, 1873, the railroad was reorganized into the New York and New England Railroad by special act of the Legislature of Massachusetts.

== New York and New England Railroad ==
On February 17, 1883, the New York and New England Railroad sold a 5.3-mile portion of the former Charles River Railroad to the Boston and Albany Railroad. The section reached from the New York and New England's original connection to the Boston and Albany Railroad in Brookline to Cook Street in Newton (at what would later become Cook Junction) and became a part of the Boston and Albany Railroad's Highland branch. To compensate for the loss of access to Boston, the railroad built a cutoff from Needham Junction east to the former Boston and Providence Railroad main line, which had since come under control of the Old Colony Railroad and, subsequently, the New York, New Haven and Hartford Railroad. The cutoff was exceptionally difficult to build, requiring several difficult rock cuts, and did not open until November 4, 1906. Originally Needham Junction was the only stop on the cutoff; Bird's Hill opened as an infill station in 1917.

The New York and New England Railroad faced many of the same problems as its predecessors, principally continued operation on lines that were otherwise not profitable. Much of the railroad was supported by money earned from the Norwich and Worcester Railroad line, which had been leased by the Boston, Hartford, and Erie Railroad. The railroad's main competitor was the New York, New Haven and Hartford Railroad, as together the two railroad controlled virtually all rail traffic in New England south of the Boston and Albany Railroad. The final nail in the coffin of the New York and New England Railroad came in 1893, when the Old Colony Railroad was leased to the New York, New Haven and Hartford Railroad. On December 27, 1893, the New York and New England Railroad declared bankruptcy, and was reorganized into the New England Railroad on August 26, 1895. Three years later, on July 1, 1898, the New York, New Haven and Hartford Railroad signed a 99-year lease of the New England Railroad, and ten years after that, on April 1, 1908, the New England Railroad was conveyed to the New York, New Haven and Hartford Railroad.

== New York, New Haven and Hartford Railroad ==
By the 1960s, the New York, New Haven and Hartford Railroad, like many railroads, was struggling to stay solvent in the face of increased competition from alternate modes of transportation, and so in 1961 it petitioned to be included in the newly formed Penn Central Transportation Company. On December 31, 1968 all of its properties were purchased by Penn Central. Penn Central, however, soon went bankrupt, and on April 1, 1976 it was taken over by Conrail. On August 22, 1998, the Surface Transportation Board approved the buyout of Conrail by CSX and Norfolk Southern.

== Current day ==
Much of the former Woonsocket Union Railroad line is abandoned, as is the case for many of the former New York and New England Railroad lines. A small section of track from a junction with the Providence and Worcester Railroad in Woonsocket to North Smithfield remained in place as-of 2014.
