= Medway Branch =

Former railway line in Massachusetts

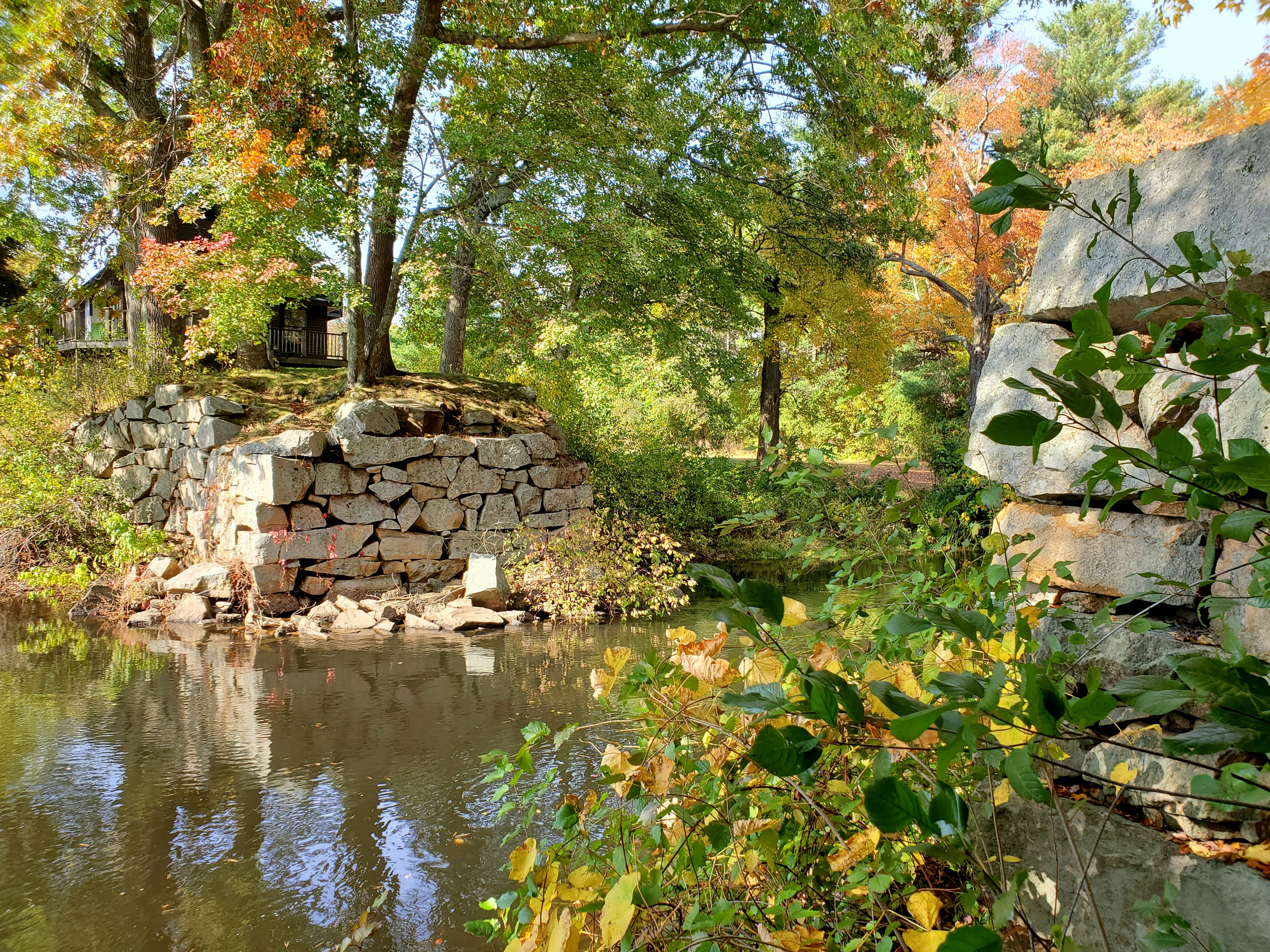
- Remaining abutments of one of the line's bridges over the Charles River

Overview
- Status: Abandoned
- Owner: Medway Branch Railroad
- Stations: 3

History
- Opened: December 29, 1852
- Closed: 1864

Technical
- Line length: 3.6 mi (5.8 km)

The Medway Branch was a railway line in Norfolk County, Massachusetts. It was built by the Medway Branch Railroad in 1852. It ran from North Wrentham, Massachusetts (now Norfolk), where it connected with the main line of the Norfolk County Railroad, to Medway, Massachusetts. The 3.6-mile (5.8 km) Medway Branch was abandoned in 1864, following the 1861 completion of the New York and Boston Railroad's separate line through Medway.

== Route ==
Map of the Medway Branch

The Medway Branch was about 3.6 miles (5.8 km) long and had a single track. From North Wrentham station, the branch ran northwest through North Wrentham (now Norfolk) to the Rockville village of Medway (now part of Millis), where it crossed the Charles River. It continued west through Medway, crossing the Charles a second time, to its Medway terminal at what is now Walker Street, southeast of Medway Village. The only intermediate station was at Rockville. The line gained 70 feet (21 m) in elevation from Medway to North Wrentham, with a maximum grade of 54 feet per mile (1.0%). A wye for turning equipment was located just east of Medway station.

== History ==
The Norfolk County Railroad opened its line between Dedham and Blackstone, Massachusetts, in 1849. In Dedham, it connected with the Boston and Providence Railroad to reach Boston. This new railroad bypassed Factory Village (later called Medway Village) to the southeast. Local interests in Medway chartered the Medway Branch Railroad on May 1, 1849, to connect their town to the Norfolk County Railroad's line.

The original plan called for the Medway Branch to split from the Norfolk County Railroad northeast of North Wrentham station, cross the Charles River only once, and terminate on the north side of Factory Village. In April 1850, the state approved a new alignment that split southwest of North Wrentham station, crossed the river twice, and terminated on the south side of Factory Village. The new route was intended to be shorter and less expensive to construct, and to provide better connection with North Wrentham station.

The original charter for the railroad also required it to be in operation within one year. The state legislature granted three extensions of this requirement. The Norfolk County Railroad leased the not-yet-complete Medway Branch Railroad in 1851. Service on the Medway Branch ultimately began on December 29, 1852. The Norfolk County operated a single daily round trip between Medway and Boston. The total cost to build the line was $37,088 (equivalent to $1,098,000 in 2024).

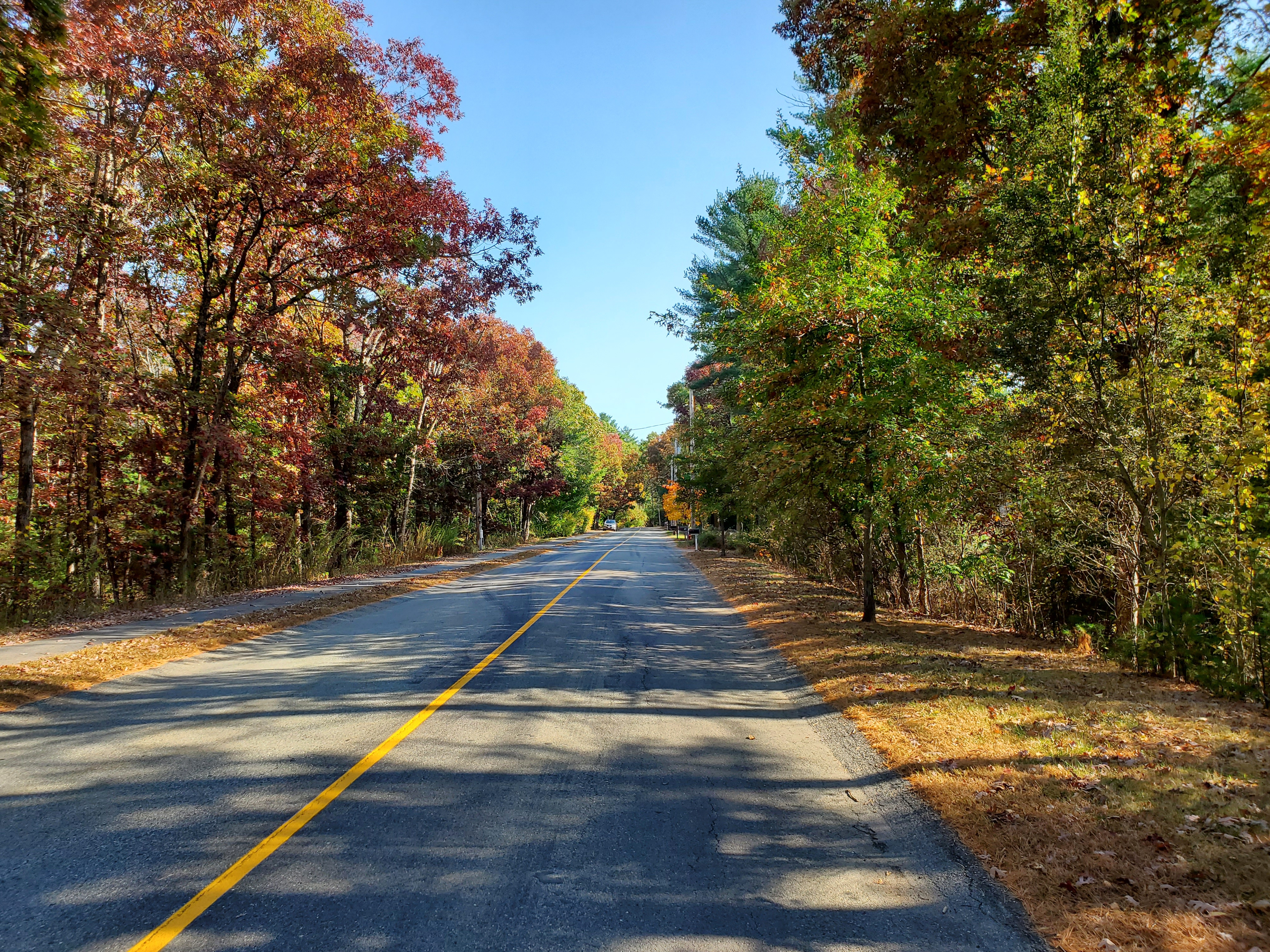
Medway Branch Road built on the former railroad alignment

The Norfolk County Railroad, Midland Railroad, and Southbridge and Blackstone Railroad were consolidated in 1853 to form the Boston and New York Central Railroad. In 1854, the B&NYC advertised three daily Boston–Medway round trips. The financial failure of the B&NYC in 1855 led to the trustees of the bondholders of the Norfolk County Railroad taking back control of their line, which they leased to the Boston and Providence from 1855 to 1857. The Medway Branch operated an independent line during this period. Connections were made at North Wrentham with three daily Boston–Blackstone round trips. The Norfolk County Railroad and the Medway Branch were leased to the East Thompson Railroad from March 1857 to March 1858, after which the Norfolk County trustees operated both railroads themselves.

Service on the line was three daily trains until 1861. That November, the New York and Boston Railroad opened its line between Needham and Medway. Its Medway station was located on the north side of the Charles River, closer to the village center, and it made the Medway Branch redundant. By mid-1862, the Norfolk County was no longer operating passenger service on the Medway Branch; a stagecoach was instead operated between North Wrentham and West Medway via Medway Village. The moribund line was acquired by the Boston, Hartford and Erie Railroad, successor to the Boston and New York Central, on May 12, 1864. It was officially abandoned that year. The Medway Branch was just the seventh rail line to be abandoned in New England.

When North Wrentham was incorporated as an independent town named Norfolk in 1870, one of the abandoned Medway Branch bridges was used to define a corner of the boundary. Part of the right of way in Norfolk was later reused for Medway Branch Road. In 1968, Norfolk's annual town meeting included an article to acquire a parcel "supposedly owned by the Medway Branch Railroad" for the town's dump – over a century after the line was abandoned. The acquisition was indefinitely postponed.
