= Hersey station =

Hersey
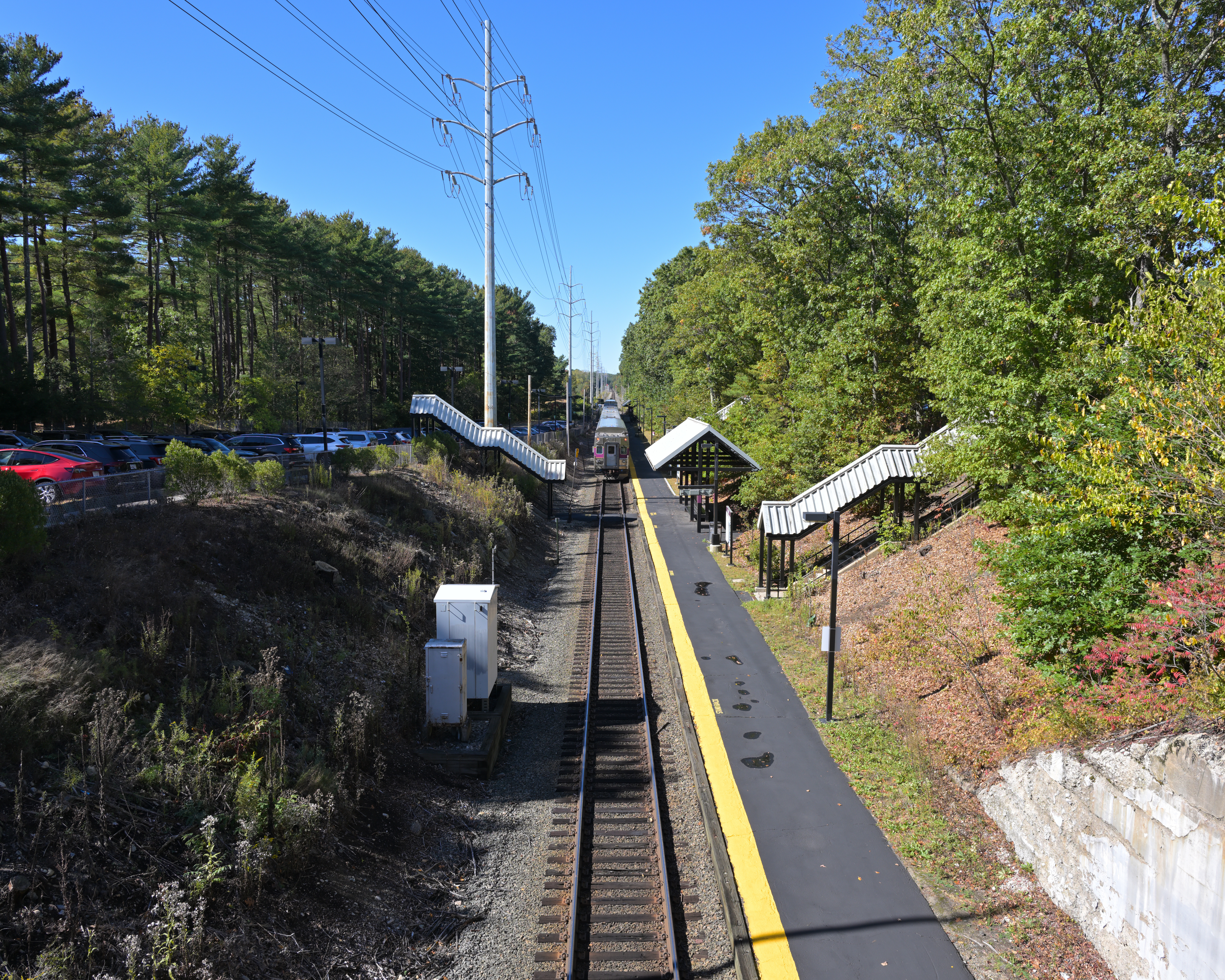
- Hersey station in October 2025, looking west

General information
- Location: Great Plain Avenue at Broad Meadow Road; Needham, Massachusetts
- Coordinates: 42.27564°N 71.21584°W
- Line: Needham Branch (Needham Cutoff)
- Platforms: 1 side platform
- Tracks: 1

Construction
- Parking: 360 spaces ($4.00 fee)
- Cycle facilities: 12 spaces
- Accessible: yes

Other information
- Fare zone: 2

History
- Opened: 1917
- Closed: October 13, 1979–October 19, 1987
- Rebuilt: c. 1991
- Former names: Bird's Hill (1917–1979)

Passengers
- 2024: 405 daily boardings

Services
Preceding station	MBTA	Following station
Needham Junction toward Needham Heights	Needham Line	West Roxbury toward South Station
Former services
Preceding station	MBTA	Following station
Needham Junction toward Millis	Millis Branch Closed 1967	West Roxbury toward South Station
Preceding station	New York, New Haven and Hartford Railroad	Following station
Needham Junction toward Woonsocket	Charles River Line	West Roxbury toward Boston
Location

Hersey station is an MBTA Commuter Rail station in Needham, Massachusetts. Located in the Bird's Hill neighborhood, it serves the Needham Line. The station serves as a park-and-ride, with easy access from Route 128. Hersey station has been open since 1917, except for an 8-year closure during Southwest Corridor construction. It is accessible.

== History ==
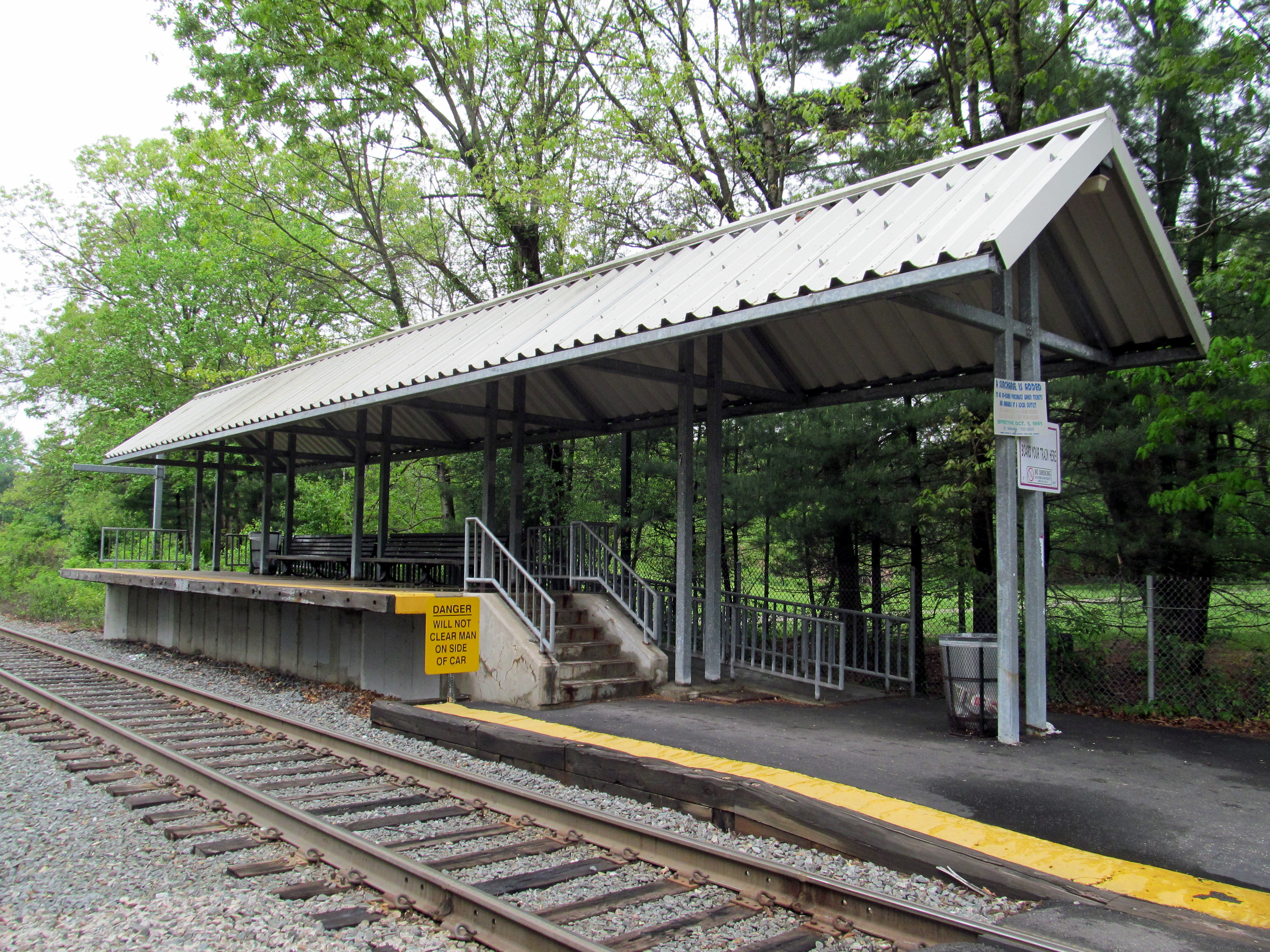
The mini-high platform at Hersey was built around 1992.

The Needham cutoff opened on November 4, 1906, from West Roxbury to Needham Junction, allowing trains from the former New York and New England Railroad to reach Boston without needing to use the New York Central's Highland branch. Building the cutoff required a significant length of difficult rock cuts - "one of the heaviest pieces of short railroad construction ever attempted in New England" - reaching a depth of 57 feet (17 m) at Great Plain Avenue. Needham Junction was originally the only stop on the cutoff; Bird's Hill opened as an infill station at Great Plains Avenue in 1917.

The station was closed with the rest of the line on October 13, 1979, due to Southwest Corridor construction. On March 21, 1980, the Massachusetts Legislature directed the MBTA to rename the station to honor Needham selectman Henry D. Hersey, "an outstanding spokesman for commuter rail service in the commonwealth". In addition to this station, the MBTA also honored Hersey by naming locomotive MBTA 1000 as Henry D. Hersey "Mr. Commuter Rail". Newly designated Hersey station reopened with the rest of the line on October 19, 1987.

Unlike the other Needham Line stations, Hersey was not renovated during the closure with a mini-high platform for handicapped accessibility. A mini-high platform was added between 1990 and 1992, making the Needham Line the first completely accessible line on the MBTA system; a parking lot was also added on the south side of the station
