= Needham Junction station =

Railway station in Needham, Massachusetts

Needham Junction
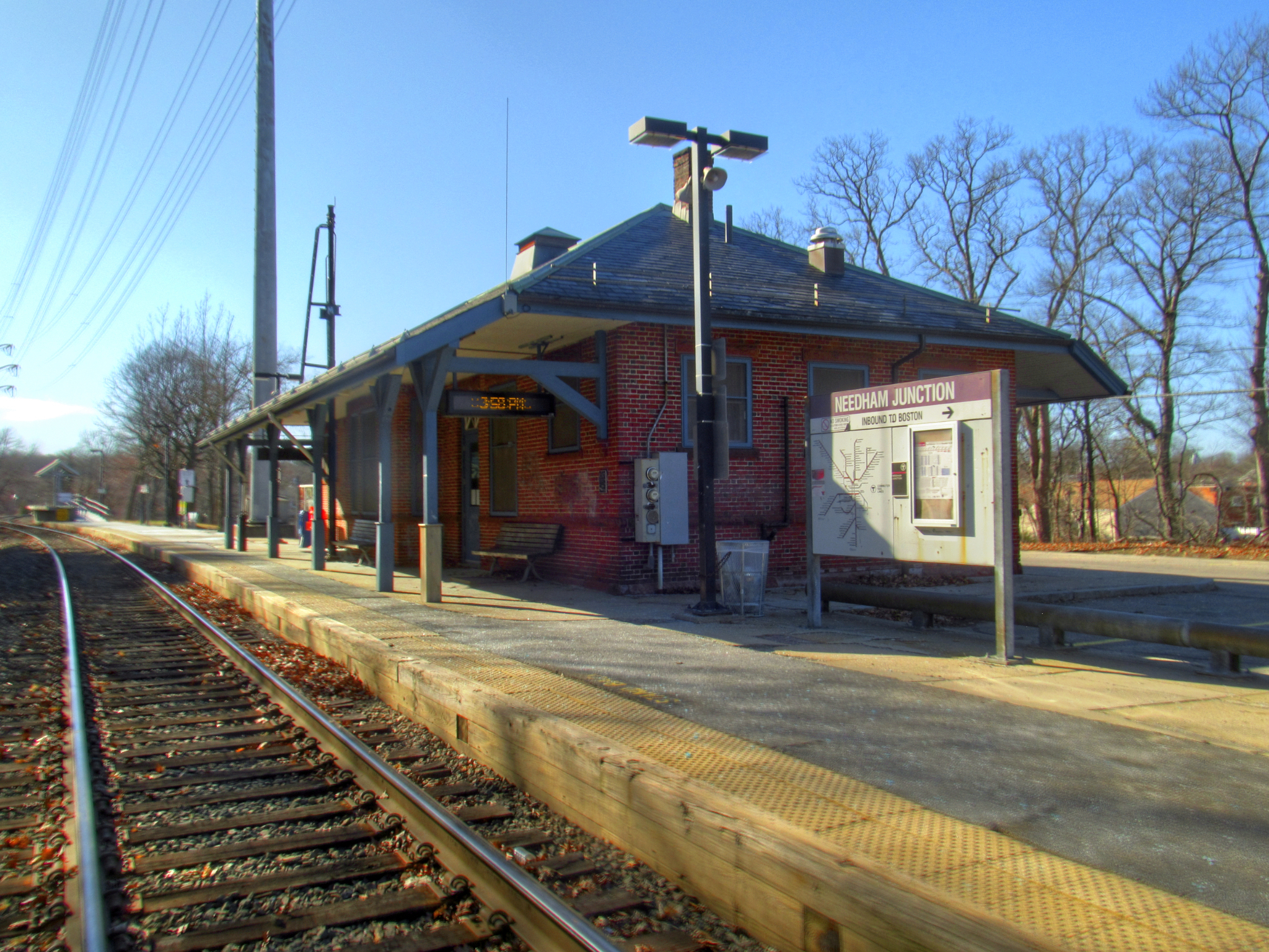
- Needham Junction station in March 2016

General information
- Location: 51 Junction Street; Needham, Massachusetts
- Coordinates: 42.27323°N 71.23586°W
- Line: Needham Cutoff (Needham Branch)
- Platforms: 1 side platform
- Tracks: 1
- Connections: MBTA bus: 59

Construction
- Parking: 175 spaces ($4.00 fee)
- Cycle facilities: 6 spaces
- Accessible: Yes

Other information
- Fare zone: 2

History
- Opened: November 4, 1906
- Closed: October 13, 1979–October 19, 1987
- Former names: West Street

Passengers
- 2024: 284 daily boardings

Services
Preceding station	MBTA	Following station
Needham Center toward Needham Heights	Needham Line	Hersey toward South Station
Former services
Preceding station	MBTA	Following station
Charles River toward Millis	Millis Branch Closed 1967	Bird's Hill toward South Station
Preceding station	New York, New Haven and Hartford Railroad	Following station
Charles River toward Woonsocket	Charles River Line	Bird's Hill toward Boston
Location

Needham Junction station is an MBTA Commuter Rail station in Needham, Massachusetts. It serves the Needham Line. It is located on Junction Street near Chestnut Street in the southwestern part of Needham. It opened in 1906 when the New Haven Railroad built the Needham Cutoff to connect the Charles River Railroad to its main line. The station has a single side platform with an accessible mini-high platform serving the line's single track.

== History ==
=== Charles River Railroad ===
On June 1, 1853, the Charles River Branch Railroad was extended from Newton Upper Falls into Needham as the first stage of a line to Dover and beyond. The railroad was not able to follow its original plan to go through the East Village, Needham's historical center, because one landowner refused to sell; instead, it was routed to Great Plain station in Great Plain Village further to the east. The line was extended to Medway on November 18, 1861 and to Woonsocket on November 16, 1863.

=== Needham Cutoff ===
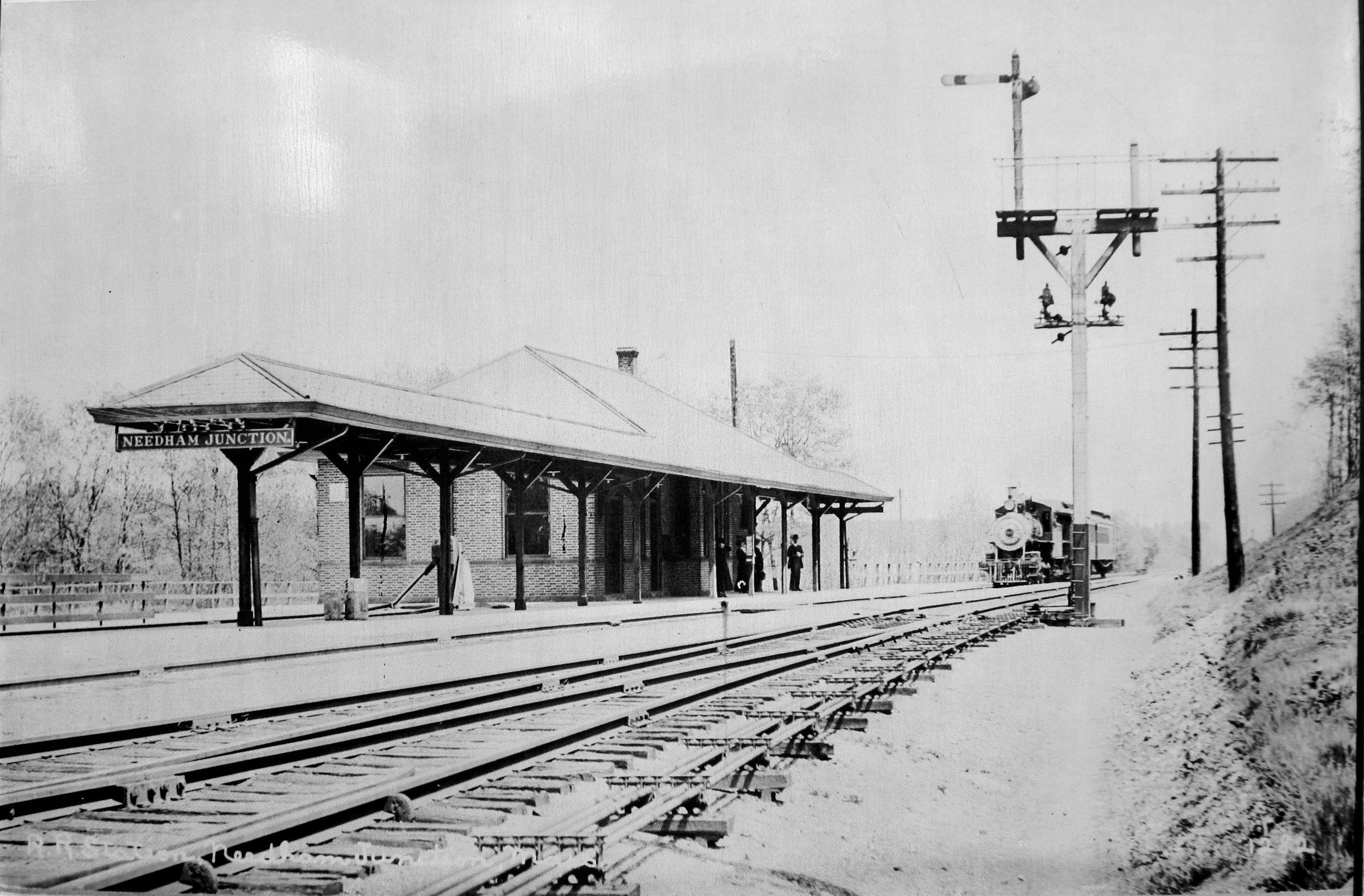
1910 photo of Needham Junction station

The New Haven Railroad opened its Needham Cutoff from West Roxbury to Needham Junction on November 4, 1906, allowing trains from the former Charles River Branch Railroad to reach Boston without needing to use the rival Boston and Albany Railroad's Highland branch. A wye was constructed at Needham Junction, allowing trains from Needham to use the cutoff as well. West Street station opened with the cutoff on November 4, 1906; it is positioned east of the junction, so as to only serve trains running on the cutoff. No station had previously been located in the area. A large granolithic platform with a canopy over much of its length was completed in 1911, by which point it was known as Needham Junction.

Loop service jointly run by the B&A and the New Haven operated over the cutoff and the Highland branch via Needham from 1911 to 1914; after that, most Needham trains originated at Needham Heights. Service between Newton Highlands and Newton Upper Falls ended in 1927, and between Needham Heights and Newton Upper Falls in 1932, leaving Needham Heights as the terminus of the line.

The West Medway Branch shared the line from Forest Hills to Needham Junction until 1938 and from 1940 to 1955; from 1955 to 1967 the line operated as a shuttle from West Medway (Millis after 1966) to Needham Junction.

=== MBTA era ===
The station was closed with the rest of the line from October 13, 1979 to October 19, 1987 during Southwest Corridor construction. A mini-high platform was added during the closure, making Needham Junction accessible. The original station building is now an ice cream parlor; MBTA tickets are sold as well. Since April 1981, MBTA bus route 59 has terminated in a loop at the west end of the station parking lot.
