= Boston Surface Railroad =

Proposed railway in Massachusetts

Overview
- Service type: Commuter rail
- Status: Proposed (defunct)
- Locale: Rhode Island, Massachusetts, and New Hampshire
- Predecessor: Penn Central's passenger service over Providence and Worcester Railroad-owned tracks
- Website: http://www.bsrc.com/

Route
- Termini: Providence Station; Concord, New Hampshire
- Stops: 3
- Service frequency: 2 daily round trips (Proposed)

Technical
- Track gauge: 1,435 mm (4 ft 8 1/2 in) standard gauge
- Track owner(s): Providence and Worcester Railroad

The Boston Surface Railroad Company (BSRC) was a proposed private commuter rail service between Providence, Rhode Island, Worcester, Massachusetts and Concord, New Hampshire on trackage owned by the Genesee & Wyoming and Pan Am Railways.

== History ==
The company was formed in 2014 by Vincent J. Bono, when it began a feasibility study for operating three trains daily over the route, with a single intermediate stop in Woonsocket, Rhode Island. The estimated initial budget was between $3 and $5 million, largely for building a platform at Worcester Union Station, building a single passing siding, and the purchase and refurbishment of three locomotives and twelve passenger cars. The project was to be privately financed, and would have used a mix of money from investors and commercial credit.

By August 2015, the feasibility study had been completed, and the company had agreed to a memorandum of understanding with the PW for the use of its trackage and had submitted a safety plan to the Federal Railroad Administration. It had begun negotiating with the PWRR for a final trackage rights agreement pending identification of all infrastructure improvements required, and had also begun work on an agreement with Amtrak for access into Providence. In September 2016, the operation was granted exemptions from certain Surface Transportation Board rules.

In 2016 the Rhode Island Department of Transportation leased the Woonsocket Depot in Woonsocket to the BSRC to be used by the company as a hub for the line. Later in 2016, the company moved its headquarters to the depot.

In June 2017, the company revised the start date to mid-2019 due to difficulties acquiring rolling stock and negotiating track usage costs with Genesee & Wyoming. However, two locomotives were acquired via auction from the Connecticut Department of Transportation in August 2018.

On June 28, 2019, the Boston Surface Railroad Company was involuntarily dissolved for failure to file an annual report by the Secretary of the Commonwealth of Massachusetts, though it was reinstated two months later after the delinquent reports were filed.

On October 6, 2019, the company filed a Chapter 11 Bankruptcy petition in the U.S. Bankruptcy Court for the District of New Hampshire. At the time, the Rhode Island Department of Transportation had won an eviction case against the company that would oust it from its headquarters at the Woonsocket Depot.

In 2020 BSRC's sole owner Vincent Bono ran unsuccessfully for a seat in the Rhode Island House of Representatives. Bono was later fined $2,000 by the Rhode Island Board of Elections for mishandling campaign funds.

In January 2021, BSRC vacated its headquarters in Woonsocket. The company claimed it would still launch service between Providence and Worcester, but the intermediate stop would be in a nearby town such as Lincoln or Blackstone.

The railroad was administratively dissolved by the State of New Hampshire on 1 September 2023.

== Planned operations ==
The railroad had planned to begin operation in 2020 with two round trips over the line each day, with morning trains traveling southbound and evening trains northbound, and a total trip time of 65 to 70 minutes between Providence and Worcester. Tickets would cost $18 round-trip. On-board amenities would include wireless Internet access and assigned seating via an electronic ticketing system. It expected to initially attract about 600 passengers per day, with ridership rising in following years.

The service was envisioned to extend north as far as Bedford, New Hampshire and Manchester-Boston Regional Airport. In October 2017, Nashua city leaders approved a memorandum of understanding with Boston Surface Railroad.

It was revealed in October 2019 that the company planned to offer a preliminary passenger bus service between Providence, Woonsocket, and Worcester in February 2020. This was delayed and later halted due to the COVID-19 pandemic.
