= Millis Center Historic District =

Historic district in Massachusetts, United States

- U.S. National Register of Historic Places
- U.S. Historic district
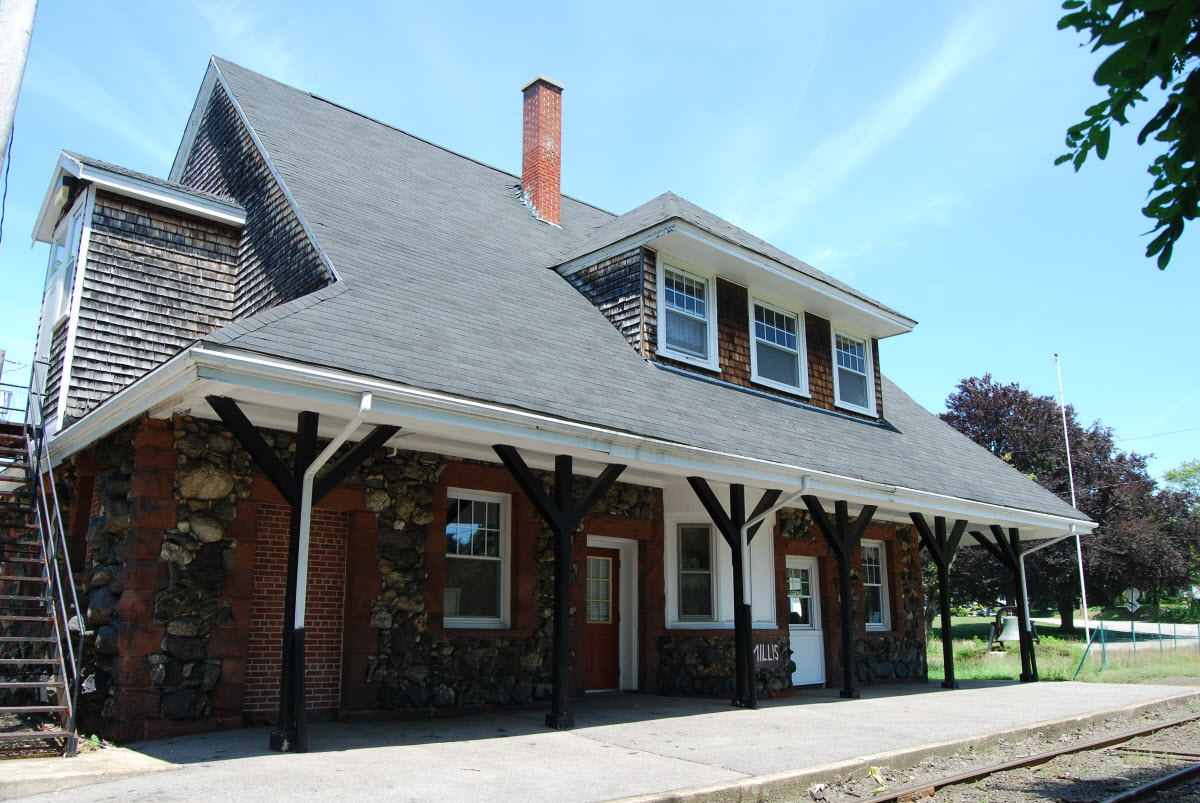

- Location within Massachusetts Location within the United States
- Location: Millis, Massachusetts
- Coordinates: 42°10′3″N 71°21′36″W
- Area: 110 acres (45 ha)
- Architect: Weston, Frank; McDonough, T.M.; Smith, George L.
- Architectural style: Late Victorian, Late 19th And 20th Century Revivals
- NRHP reference No.: 07000944
- Added to NRHP: September 14, 2007

The Millis Center Historic District is an historic district on Curve, Daniels, Exchange, Irving, Lavender, Main, and Union Streets in Millis, Massachusetts. It encompasses the historic mid-to-late-19th century village center of the town, including the residential area north of Main Street, two 19th-century industrial complexes, and civic and institutional buildings. It was added to the National Register of Historic Places in 2007.

== Description and history ==
The area that is now Millis was settled by the English in the 1640s, and was for many years part of Medway before being separately incorporated in 1885. Its town center developed around a north-south route, now Massachusetts Route 115 (partly Exchange Street and partly Plain Street); and an east-west route now designated in sections as Exchange Street, Curve Street and Union Street. The much straighter Main Street, now Massachusetts Route 109, was built in 1809 as the Hartford and Dedham Turnpike, and the railroad was built through the area between the east-west routes in the 1850s. The town was predominantly agrarian until the 1880s, when reliable rail service was introduced. Lansing Millis, for whom the town is named, opened a shoe factory, steel factory, and bottling plant there, and was responsible for the town's growth as an industrial center.

The historic district extends along Main Street from Exchange to Plain Street, and along the curving route of Exchange, Curve and Union Streets, from Main Street in the west to its eastern railroad junction. It also extends northward along Exchange Street from its junction with Curve. The district, 110 acres (45 ha) in size, includes civic, commercial, industrial and residential properties. Most of its buildings were erected after 1850, with only four houses and one church (the First Parish Church at 142 Exchange Street) constructed earlier. The oldest house, dating from the mid-18th century, is that of John Richardson, a typical Georgian colonial at 191 Curve Street.

== See also ==
- National Register of Historic Places listings in Norfolk County, Massachusetts
- Millis (MBTA station)
