= Millis Branch =

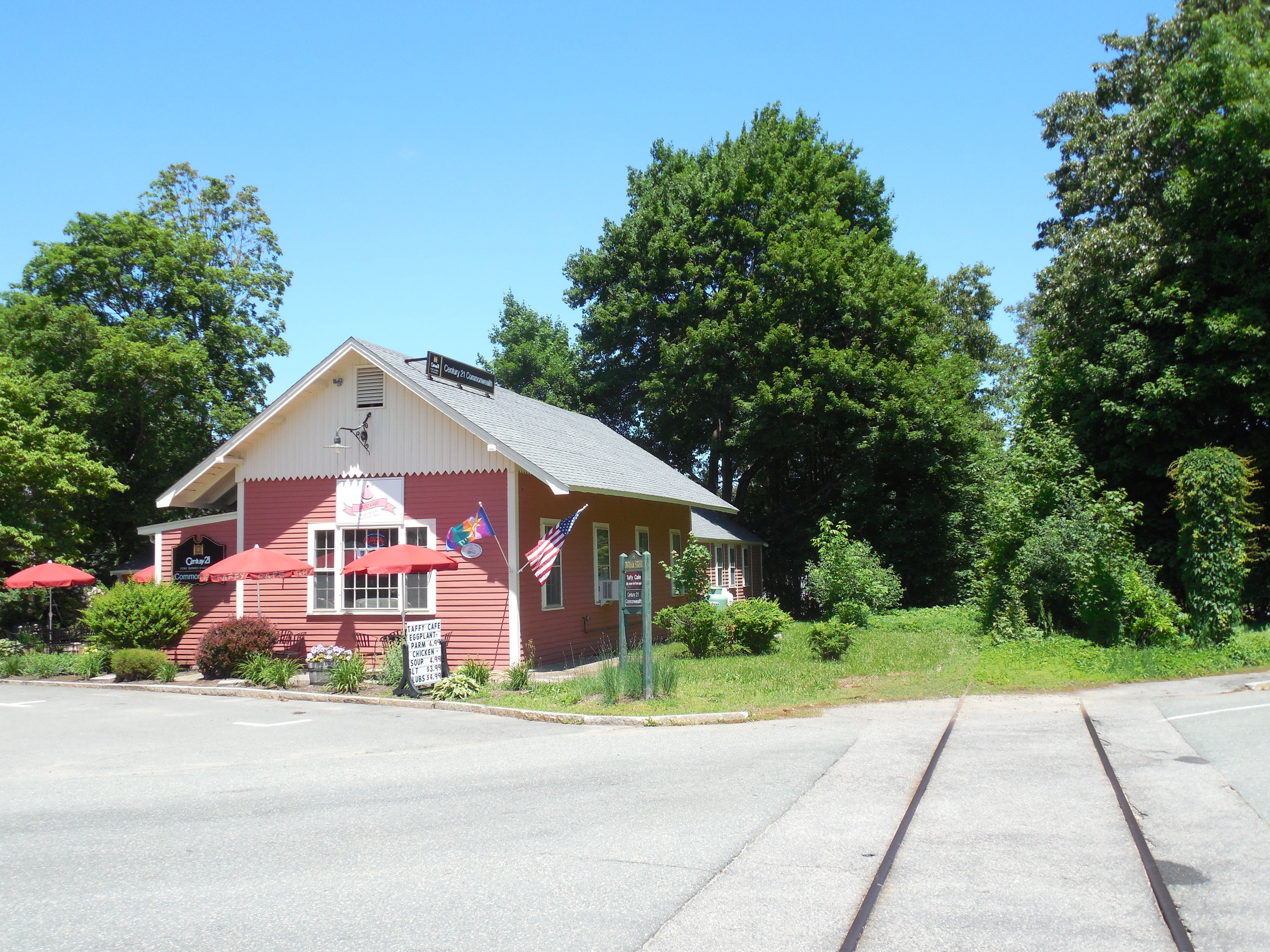
- The former station building at Dover, as seen in 2014

Overview
- Status: Abandoned
- Owner: New York, New Haven and Hartford Railroad, later Massachusetts Bay Transportation Authority
- Locale: Southeastern Massachusetts
- Termini: Boston South Station; Millis
- Stations: 14

Service
- Type: Commuter rail
- System: Massachusetts Bay Transportation Authority
- Operator(s): New York, New Haven and Hartford Railroad, later MBTA, Massachusetts Coastal Railroad (freight)

History
- Opened: 1861 (Charles River Branch Railroad)
- Closed: April 21, 1967

Technical
- Line length: 22.1 miles
- Character: Surface-level
- Track gauge: 4 ft 8 1/2 in (1,435 mm)

The Millis Branch was a branch of what is now the MBTA Commuter Rail system in Massachusetts, United States. Branching off the still-operating Needham Line at Needham Junction, it ran through the towns of Dover, Medfield, Millis, and Medway. Due to lack of subsidies and poor ridership, the line was cut back to Millis station in April 1966, and all service ended on April 21, 1967, with the exception of some freight use on short portions of the line.

== History ==
The Charles River Branch Railroad was extended from Needham Center to Woonsocket, Rhode Island, in stages between 1861 and 1863 under the New York & Boston Railroad, with service operating to Boston via the Highland branch. Initial plans to extend the line to New York City as an air-line railroad never came to pass, but a small portion of this route was built as the Woonsocket and Pascoag Railroad, opening from Woonsocket to Pascoag, Rhode Island, in 1891; the latter line became functionally an extension of the Charles River Branch, with through trains from Pascoag to and from Boston, although not on schedules suitable for commuting. Ownership of the line passed through the Boston, Hartford and Erie Railroad, New York and New England Railroad, and, finally, to the New York, New Haven and Hartford Railroad (commonly referred to as just the "New Haven Railroad"), which consolidated essentially the entire southern and southeastern Massachusetts rail network under its umbrella. After the Needham cutoff opened on November 4, 1906, service from Woonsocket and intermediate stops ran over the cutoff rather than via the Highland branch.

With the Midland Line (now the Franklin/Foxboro Line) as the primary Woonsocket route for the New Haven Railroad, the Charles River Branch served as a minor branch line. After 1926, all service to Woonsocket was provided by shuttle trains from Woonsocket to Bellingham Junction; service north of Bellingham Junction was provided by trains from Boston to Franklin via Needham and Bellingham Junction, as well as trains travelling via the Charles River Branch outbound and the Midland Line inbound or vice versa. Service beyond Bellingham Junction was discontinued entirely in 1930, and the portion of the line between Woonsocket and the state line was completely abandoned in 1934. All service beyond Needham Junction was discontinued on July 13, 1938. Service to Bellingham Junction was briefly restored in March 1940 with a single daily round trip between Boston and Franklin via the Charles River Branch, but this was cut back to Caryville station in North Bellingham in May 1940; at the same time, however, additional service was added between Boston and West Medway. In September 1941, all remaining Caryville service was cut back to West Medway, which would remain the terminus of the branch for the next 25 1/2 years. After 1955, service on the branch was reduced to one single-car round trip to West Medway, which was combined with a longer Needham Heights train at Needham Junction.

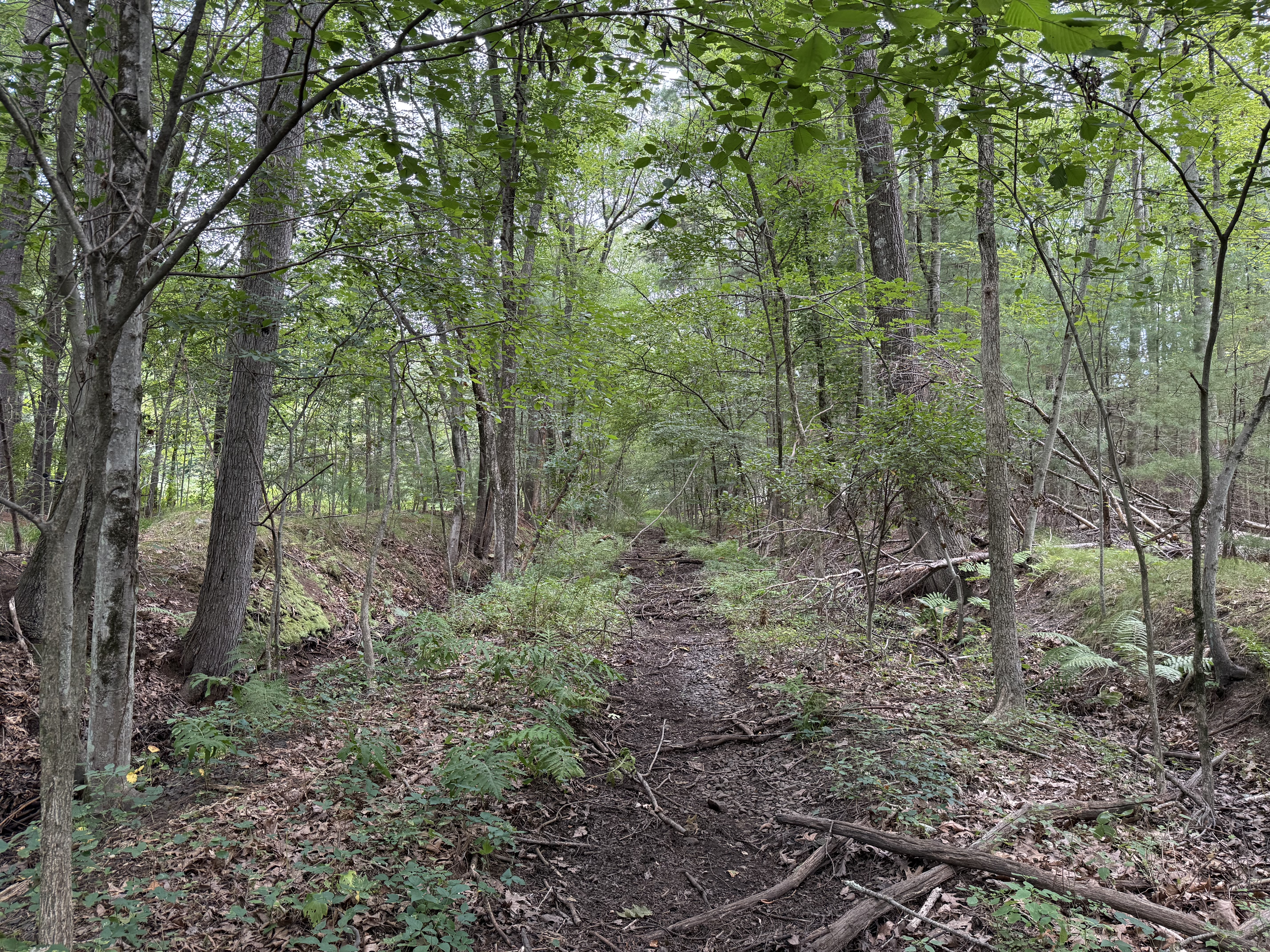
Abandoned railroad bed near West Medway in 2025

By the time the Massachusetts Bay Transportation Authority (MBTA) was founded in August 1964 to subsidize suburban commuter rail service, the West Medway Branch was moribund. Subsidies to the New Haven Railroad for the Needham, West Medway, Dedham, and Franklin lines began on April 24, 1966; out-of-district Medway declined to provide additional funding, and the line was cut back to Millis as the Millis Branch. The sole remaining round trips to Millis and Dedham were cut on April 21, 1967, due to extremely poor ridership.

The former stations at Dover (now a Dunkin Donuts) and Millis (now town offices) are still extant; the other six stations west of Needham Junction have been demolished.

A 6-mile section of the branch from Needham Junction to Ice House Road in Medfield is planned to be converted into a compacted stone dust multi-use path as a portion of the 7-mile Bay Colony Rail Trail project. The Needham section, stretching 1.7 miles from High Rock St. to the Charles River, opened on May 1, 2016. In July 2020, the state awarded $100,000 for construction of the Medfield Rail Trail, running 1.3 miles from Medfield Junction to the Dover line. This section opened on October 1, 2022. The Dover section, which would connect the Medfield and Needham sections to create a continuous trail, remains in planning as of the end of 2022.

The line sees occasional freight use from Medfield Junction into Millis, operated by the Massachusetts Coastal Railroad. Freight rights to the line were formerly owned by Bay Colony Railroad until November 2023, when Massachusetts Coastal Railroad indicated that it would be purchasing the remaining Millis Branch section from the Bay Colony and taking over operations on the line. The purchase was initially rejected by the Surface Transportation Board due to uncertainty about the status of the line. The STB approved the Millis Branch transfer in June 2024.

== Station and junction listing ==
Milepost	City	Station/junction	Opening date	Closing date	Notes
0.0	Boston	South Station	January 1, 1899		Still operating
1.2	Boston	Back Bay	January 1, 1899		Still operating
6.4	Boston	Roslindale Village	1870		Still operating
7.2	Boston	Bellevue	1870		Still operating
7.6	Boston	Highland	1870		Still operating
8.0	Boston	West Roxbury	1870		Still operating
10.9	Needham	Bird's Hill	1917		Still operating as Hersey
12.0	Needham	Needham Junction	November 4, 1906		Still operating
13.8	Needham	Charles River	November 18, 1861; March 1940	July 18, 1938; April 21, 1967	
15.2	Dover	Dover	November 18, 1861; March 1940	July 18, 1938; April 21, 1967	Station building still survives as a café
18.2	Medfield	Farm Street	November 18, 1861; March 1940	July 18, 1938; April 21, 1967	
19.3	Medfield	Medfield Junction	November 18, 1861; March 1940	July 18, 1938; April 21, 1967	Junction with NYNH&H Mansfield and Framingham Railroad
21.5	Millis	Clicquot	November 18, 1861; March 1940	July 18, 1938; April 21, 1967	Mainly a freight station by the 1960s
22.1	Millis	Millis	November 18, 1861; March 1940	July 18, 1938; April 21, 1967	Station building still survives and is rented out for commercial purposes
24.6	Medway	Medway	November 18, 1861; March 1940	July 18, 1938; April 24, 1966	
26.1	Medway	West Medway	September 1862; March 1940	July 18, 1938; April 24, 1966	
