= Needham Center station =

Railway station in Needham, Massachusetts, US

Needham Center
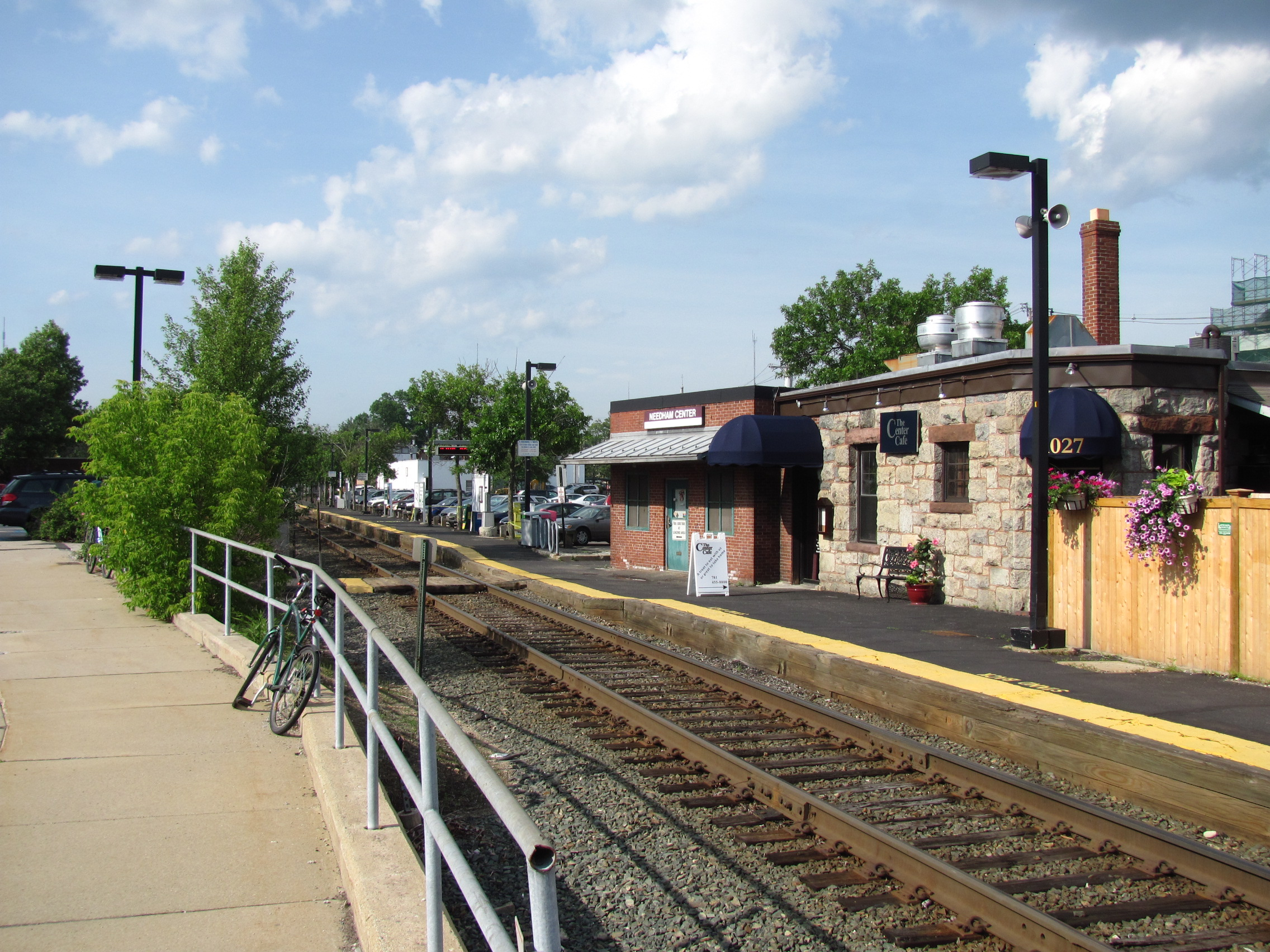
- Needham Center station in June 2010

General information
- Location: Great Plain Avenue and Eaton Square; Needham, Massachusetts
- Coordinates: 42.28138°N 71.23752°W
- Line: Needham Branch (Charles River Branch)
- Platforms: 1 side platform
- Tracks: 1
- Connections: MBTA bus: 59

Construction
- Cycle facilities: 6 spaces
- Accessible: Yes

Other information
- Fare zone: 2

History
- Opened: June 1, 1853
- Closed: October 13, 1979–October 19, 1987
- Rebuilt: 1887, 1980s
- Former names: Great Plain, Needham Plain, Needham

Passengers
- 2024: 199 daily boardings

Services
Preceding station	MBTA	Following station
Needham Heights Terminus	Needham Line	Needham Junction toward South Station
Location

Needham Center station is a commuter rail station on the MBTA Commuter Rail Needham Line, located just north of Great Plain Avenue (Route 135) in downtown Needham, Massachusetts. The first station at Needham opened in 1853; it burned in 1887 and was replaced with a stone station, some of which is still in place. The station has one side platform with an accessible mini-high platform serving the line's single track.

== History ==
=== Great Plain ===
On June 1, 1853, the Charles River Branch Railroad was extended from Newton Upper Falls into Needham as the first stage of a line to Dover and beyond. The railroad was not able to follow its original plan to go through the East Village, Needham's historical center, because one landowner refused to sell; instead, it was routed to Great Plain station in Great Plain Village further to the east. Great Plain served as the terminus of the railroad until it was extended to Medway in 1861 and to Woonsocket in 1863.

=== Needham ===
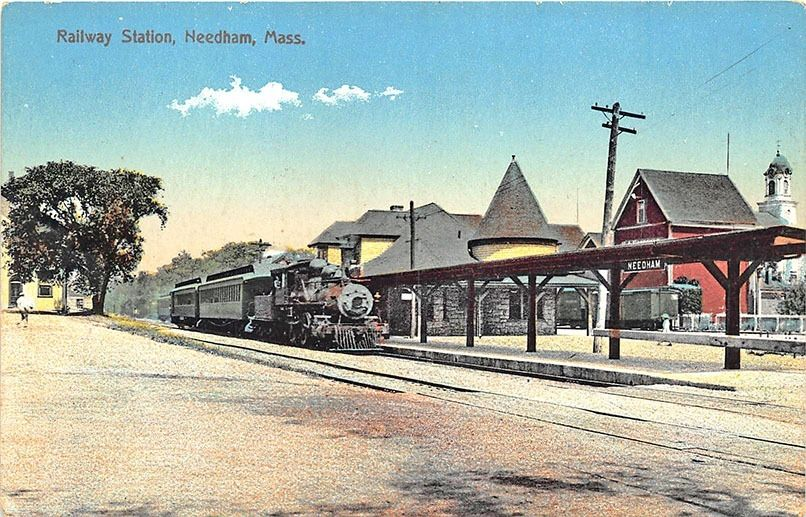
1887-built Needham station on a c. 1910 postcard

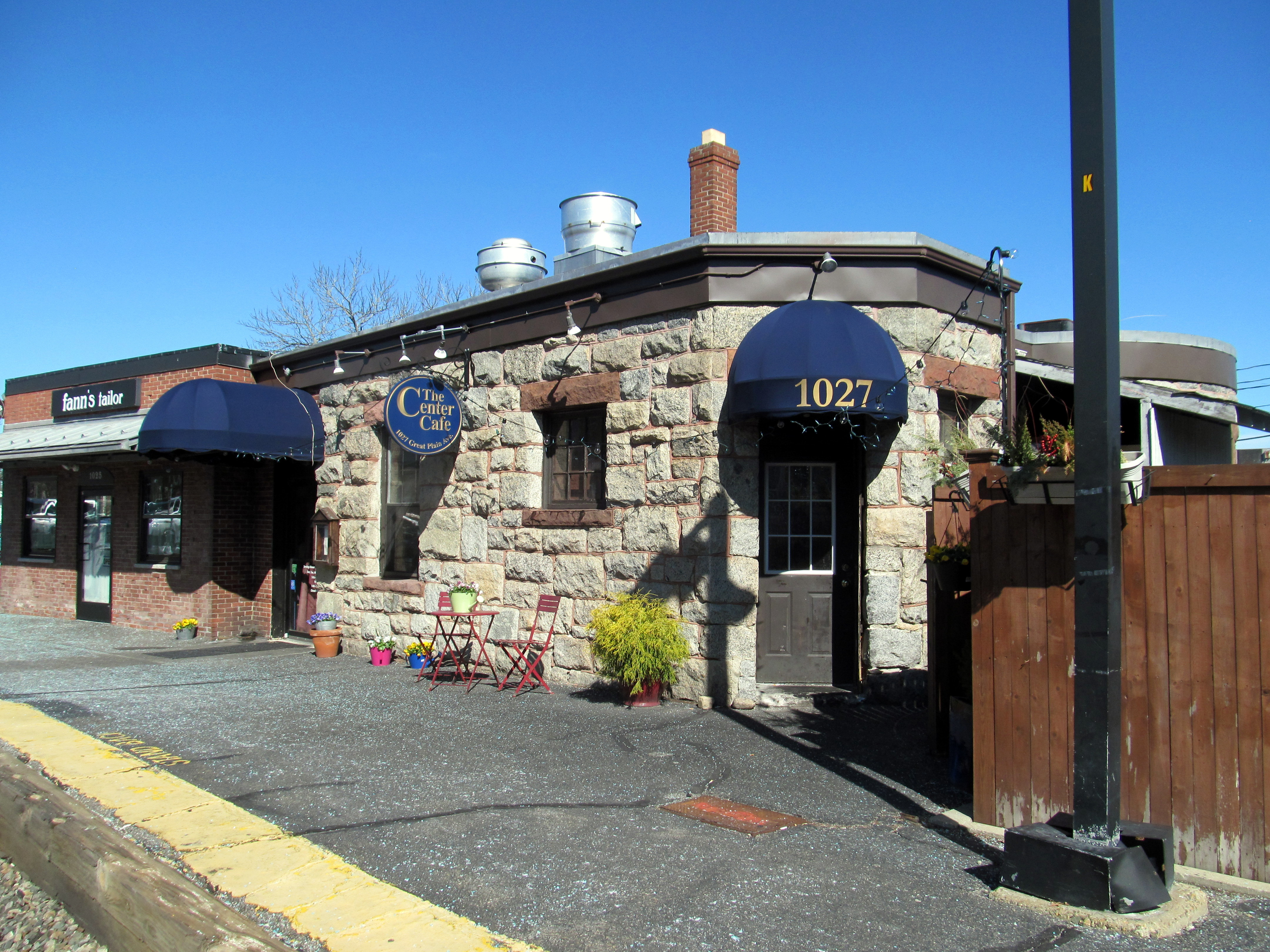
One corner of the 1887 station is extant and used as a restaurant

With the coming of the railroad, Great Plain Village eclipsed East Village as the primary business district of Needham, and it officially became the town center in 1879. The station's name was gradually changed to Needham Plain, then Needham.

By the 1880s, the line was part of the New York and New England Railroad. The original gable-roofed wooden station burned in 1887 and was replaced with a stone station with a turreted roof. Most of the building was destroyed in the mid 20th century, but one corner remains and is part of a restaurant.

=== Needham Cutoff ===
The line became part of the New Haven Railroad's Midland Division in 1898. In 1906, the New Haven opened the Needham cutoff, a faster route to Boston that avoided the rival Boston and Albany Railroad's Highland branch tracks. The line through Needham was thus downgraded from an intercity route to a branch line.

Loop service jointly run by the B&A and the New Haven operated over the cutoff and the Highland branch via Needham from 1911 to 1914; after that, most Needham trains originated at Needham Heights. Service between Newton Highlands and Newton Upper Falls ended in 1927, and between Needham Heights and Newton Upper Falls in 1932, leaving Needham Heights as the terminus of the line.

=== MBTA era ===
The MBTA bought Penn Central's southside commuter rail assets, including the Needham Line, on January 27, 1973. The station was closed with the rest of the line from October 13, 1979 to October 19, 1987 during Southwest Corridor construction. Upon reopening, the station was renamed as Needham Center to differentiate it from Needham Heights and Needham Junction stations. A mini-high platform was added during the closure, making Needham Center fully accessible.

The MBTA acquired a brick structure next to the remaining part of the station building in 1991 for use as a waiting room. After years of disuse, the agency sold the building in 2012.
