= Newton and Boston Street Railway =

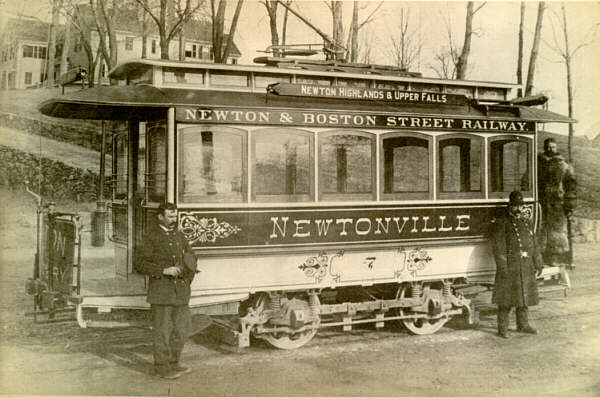
Newton and Boston Street Railway trolley car

The Newton and Boston Street Railway was a streetcar company in the Boston, Massachusetts area, eventually bought by the Middlesex and Boston Street Railway. Its line is now the 59 Needham Junction – Watertown Square via Newtonville bus.

== History ==
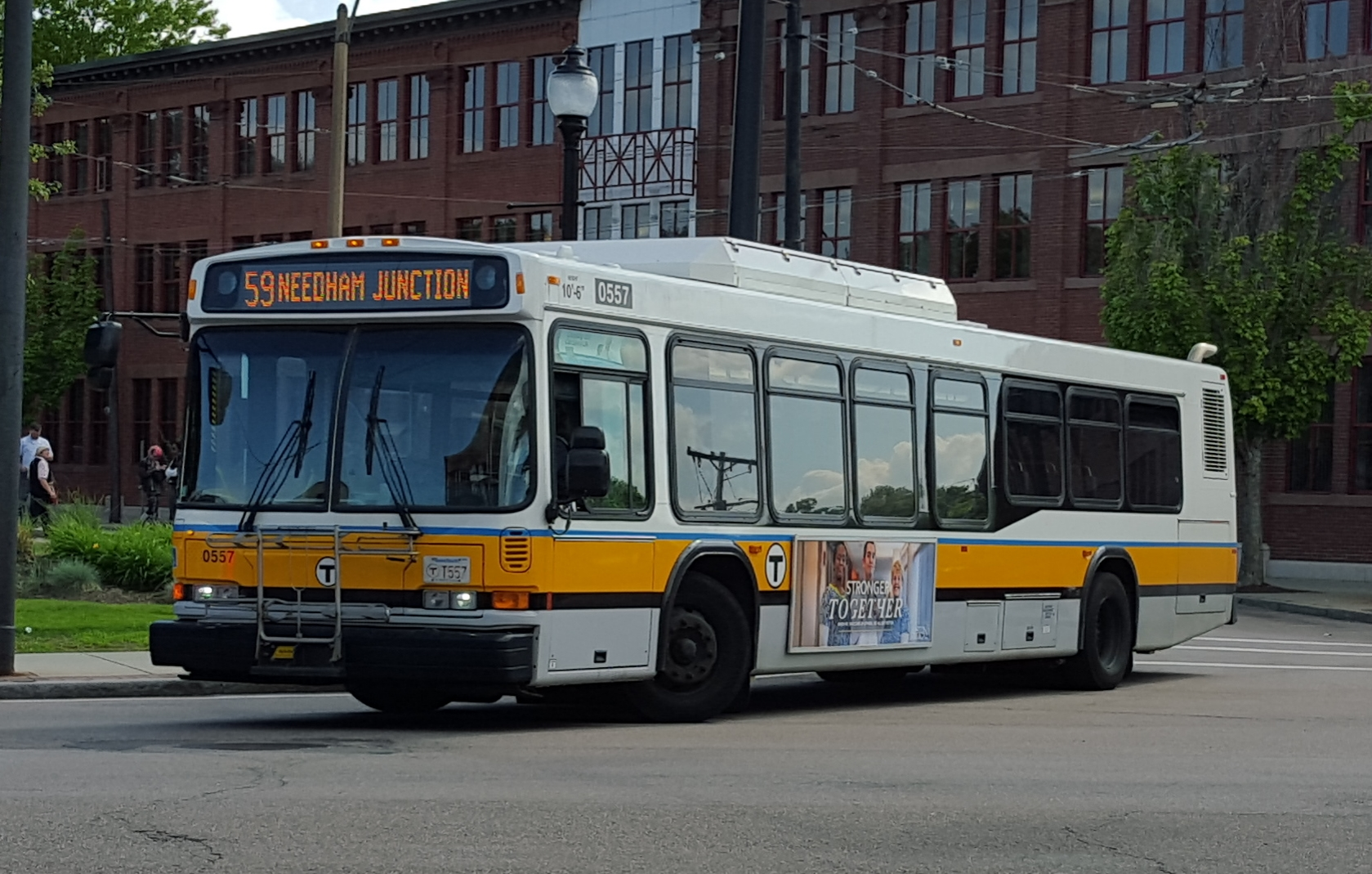
A modern-day route 59 bus leaving Watertown Square

The Newton and Boston Street Railway was organized in 1891. It soon opened an electric trolley line between Newton Upper Falls and Newtonville, with regular service beginning August 31, 1892.

An 1897 map and an 1899 map show a branch to Newton Centre. The 1899 map also shows a branch of the Commonwealth Avenue Street Railway very closely paralleling it. In 1899, the company proposed a never-built line between Reservoir and Newton Center via Beacon Street.

The Newtonville and Watertown Street Railway was leased October 1, 1897, allowing it to continue northeast to Watertown. An extension southwest to Needham center was built in 1906. On October 9, 1909, the Newton and Boston was merged into the Middlesex and Boston Street Railway.

The line was bustituted in 1926. The Massachusetts Bay Transportation Authority began to subsidize the route in September 1964, and assigned it the number 32 Needham–Watertown. When the MBTA took over the M&B on June 30, 1972, it was renumbered to 532. It was again renumbered in September 1982, and is now the 59 Needham Junction – Watertown Square via Newtonville.

== Route ==
The only changes from the original route to the present day have been at Newton Upper Falls. The original alignment was rather circuitous, looping north of Eliot Street on High, Summer and Chestnut Streets, presumably to avoid steep grades. An alignment in the mid-1970s used a one-way pair, with the northbound direction looping south of Eliot Street. It now uses the old northbound side at Oak and Chestnut Streets in both directions, the opposite of the original route.

Until 20 April 1981, the route only went north from Needham Center station; it was extended at that time to Needham Junction. 59A Needham Street–Watertown Square was added in December 1984, running Watertown to Newton Highlands station, and splitting there onto its own alignment to the Needham Industrial Park. 59A service was merged into 59 in December 1989, with alternate weekday trips using the 59A alignment and continuing to Newton Junction.

The branch to Newton Centre split from the main route on Walnut Street heading east on Homer Street. It turned south on Centre Street, southeast on Willow Street, south on Sumner Street, and west on Beacon Street, ending at Centre Street.
