= Needham Heights station =

Railway station in Needham, Massachusetts, US

Needham Heights
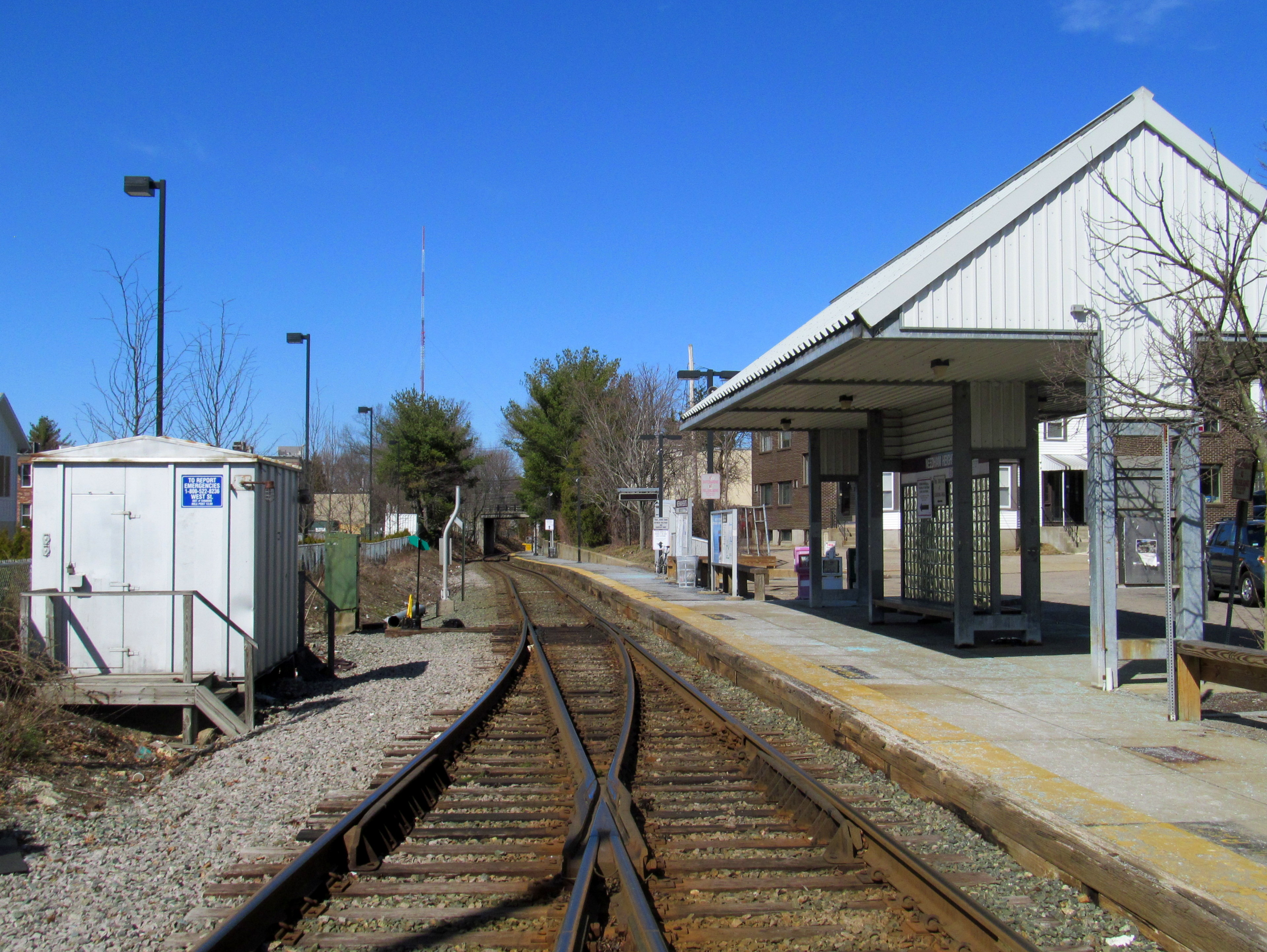
- Needham Heights station in March 2016

General information
- Location: 95 West Street; Needham, Massachusetts
- Coordinates: 42.2934°N 71.2360°W
- Line: Needham Branch (Charles River Branch)
- Platforms: 1 side platform
- Tracks: 1
- Connections: MBTA bus: 59

Construction
- Parking: 71 spaces (permit only)
- Cycle facilities: 6
- Accessible: Yes

Other information
- Fare zone: 2

History
- Opened: c. 1860
- Closed: October 13, 1979–October 19, 1987
- Rebuilt: 1980s
- Former names: Highlandville

Passengers
- 2024: 242 daily boardings

Services
Preceding station	MBTA	Following station
Terminus	Needham Line	Needham Center toward South Station
Location

Needham Heights station is an MBTA Commuter Rail station in the Needham Heights neighborhood of Needham, Massachusetts. It is the terminus of the Needham Line. The station has one low-level side platform with a mini-high section for accessibility serving the single track of the Needham Branch.

Highlandville station opened around 1860 as an infill station on the New York and Boston Railroad (Charles River Branch Railroad). It was renamed Needham Heights in 1907. It became the terminus of passenger service on the line in 1932. The station was rebuilt during the 1979–1987 closure of the Needham Line.

== History ==
=== Highlandville ===
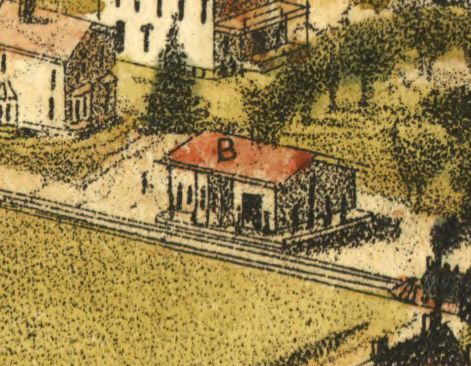
Highlandville station in 1887

On June 1, 1853, the Charles River Branch Railroad was extended from Newton Upper Falls into Needham as the first stage of a line to Dover and beyond. The railroad was not able to follow its original plan to go through the East Village, Needham's historical center, because one landowner refused to sell. Instead, it was routed to Great Plain station in Great Plain Village further to the east. A station at Highlandville was added around 1860, by which time the line was under control of the New York and Boston Railroad.

=== Needham Heights ===
The line became part of the New Haven Railroad's Midland Division in 1898. Around 1900, a movement began to change the name of the Highlandville neighborhood. Needham Highlands was rejected for the similarity to Newton Highlands; on May 28, 1907, the post office was renamed as Needham Heights. The station was also changed to Needham Heights by November 1907.

=== Needham Cutoff ===
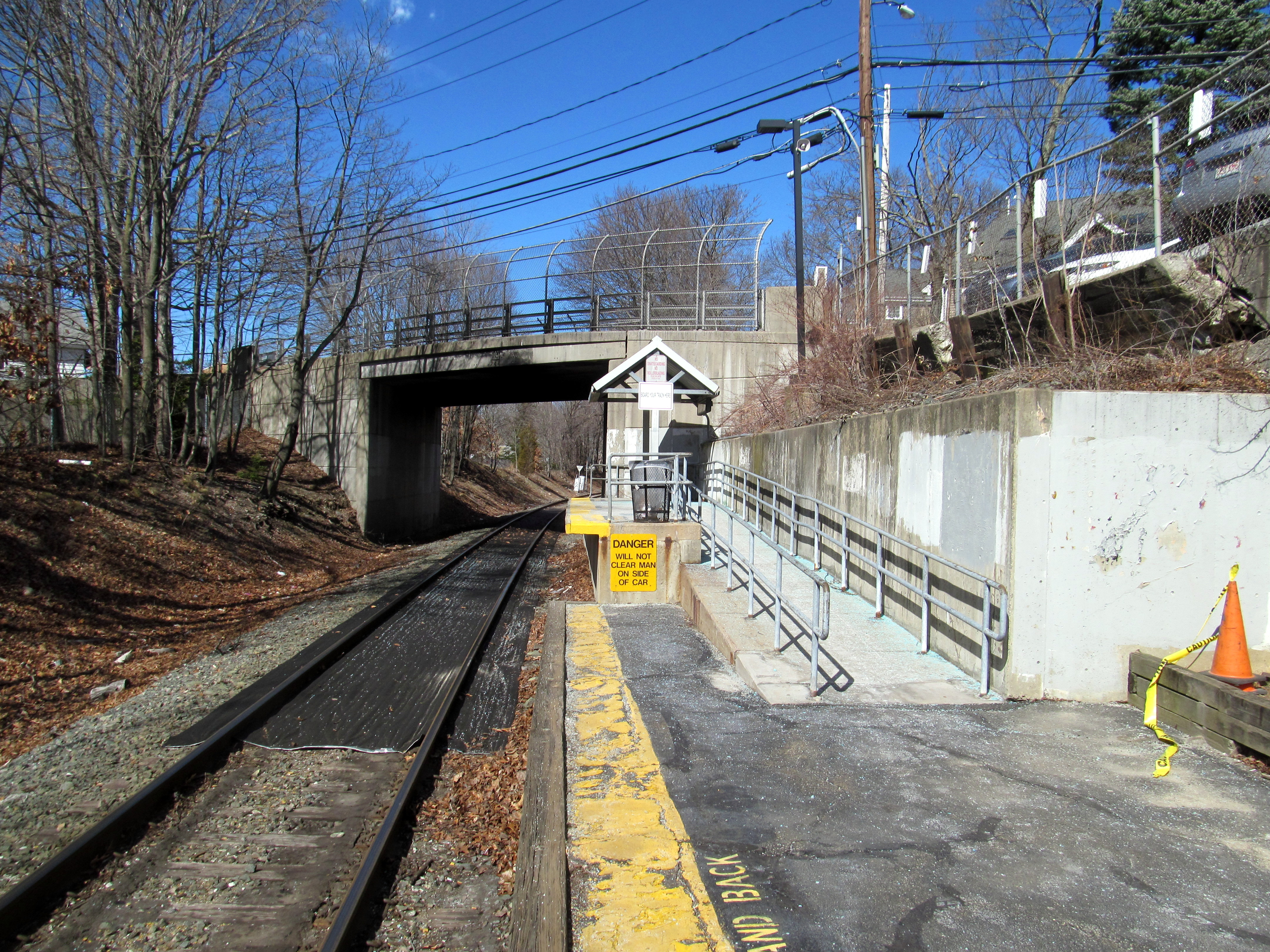
Mini-high platform built during the 1980s closure of the line

In 1906, the New Haven opened the Needham cutoff, a faster route to Boston that avoided the rival Boston and Albany Railroad's Highland branch tracks. The line through Needham was thus downgraded from an intercity route to a branch line. Loop service jointly run by the B&A and the New Haven operated over the cutoff and the Highland branch via Needham from 1911 to 1914; after that, most Needham trains originated at Needham Heights. Service between Newton Highlands and Newton Upper Falls ended in 1927, and between Needham Heights and Newton Upper Falls in 1932, leaving Needham Heights as the terminus of the line.

=== MBTA era ===
The Needham Heights station building, a gable-roofed wooden structure, was removed in the 1960s. The MBTA bought Penn Central's southside commuter rail assets, including the Needham Line, on January 27, 1973. The station was closed with the rest of the line from October 13, 1979 to October 19, 1987 during Southwest Corridor construction. A mini-high platform was added during the closure, making Needham Heights fully accessible. The mini-high platform was indefinitely closed on September 8, 2022, with a portable lift used for accessibility; it reopened by early November.
