= Medway station =

Medway
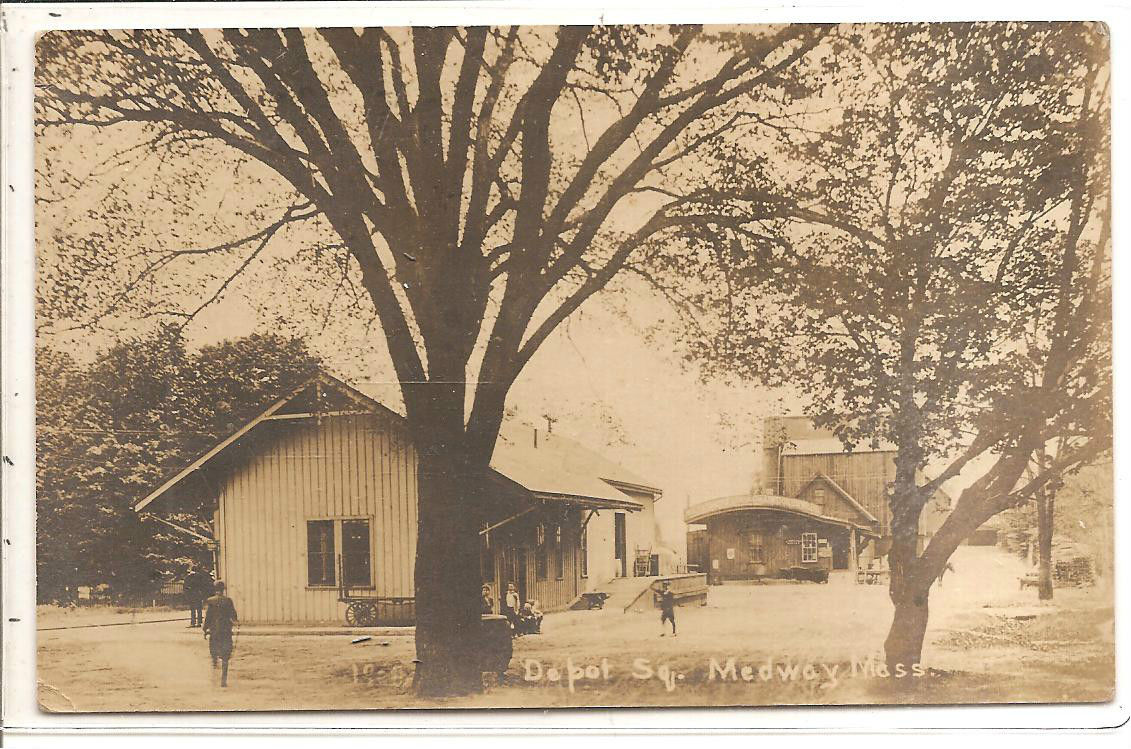
- Medway station, c. 1907 – c. 1915

General information
- Location: Winter Street, Medway, Massachusetts
- Coordinates: 42°8′39.09″N 71°23′51.74″W
- Line: West Medway Branch
- Platforms: 1 side platform
- Tracks: 2

History
- Opened: November 18, 1861; March 1940
- Closed: July 18, 1938; April 24, 1966

Services
Preceding station	MBTA	Following station
West Medway Terminus	Millis Branch	Millis toward South Station
Former services
Preceding station	New York, New Haven and Hartford Railroad	Following station
West Medway toward Woonsocket	Charles River Line	Millis toward Boston
Location

Medway station was a railroad station in Medway, Massachusetts. It served the West Medway Branch (later the Millis Branch), and opened in 1861.

== History ==
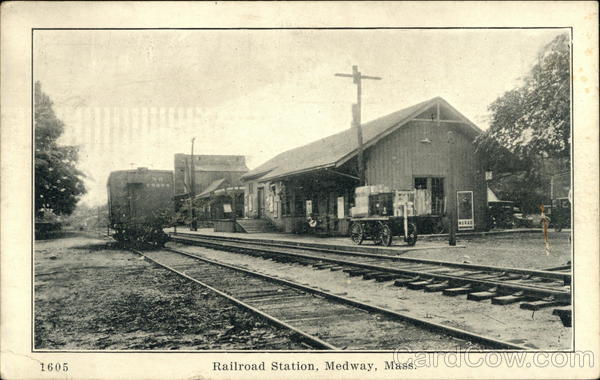
A postcard of Medway station, c. 1907 – c. 1915

Medway station was originally part of the New York, New Haven and Hartford Railroad, until the line was cut back to Needham Junction in July 1938. Service to Medway was restored in 1940 when the line was extended to Bellingham Junction, but was shortly thereafter cut back to Caryville, only to be cut back further to West Medway in 1941. By 1955, ridership on the line was remarkably poor, and only a single round trip per day served the station.

Only two years after the Massachusetts Bay Transportation Authority was formed, service to the station was no longer available. The Town of Medway decided to not continue funding the train and the line was subsequently cut back to Millis. Just under a year later, service on the entire line past Needham Junction was discontinued, and has not returned since.

Both the tracks and the station building are long destroyed, and the only indication of former railroad service in the town is a dirt path where the railroad formerly ran.
