= Millis station =

Former railroad station in Millis, Massachusetts

Millis
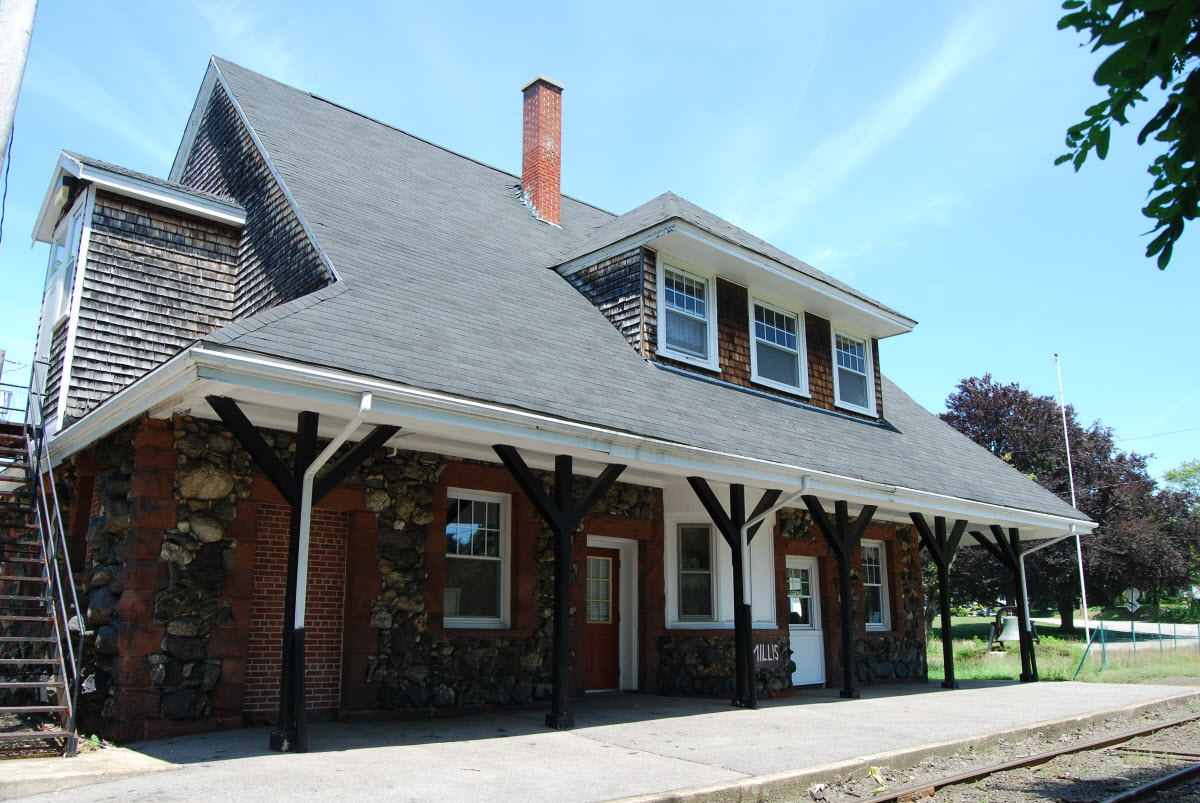
- Millis station in 2009

General information
- Location: Millis, Massachusetts
- Coordinates: 42°10′3″N 71°21′36″W
- Owner: New York, New Haven and Hartford Railroad
- Line: Millis Branch
- Platforms: 1 side platform
- Tracks: 2

History
- Opened: 1886
- Closed: April 21, 1967

Services
Preceding station	MBTA	Following station
Terminus	Millis Branch	Clicquot toward South Station
Former services
Preceding station	New York, New Haven and Hartford Railroad	Following station
Medway toward Woonsocket	Charles River Line	Clicquot toward Boston
Location

Millis was a railroad station in Millis, Massachusetts. It served the Millis Branch (formerly the West Medway Branch), and opened in 1886.

== History ==
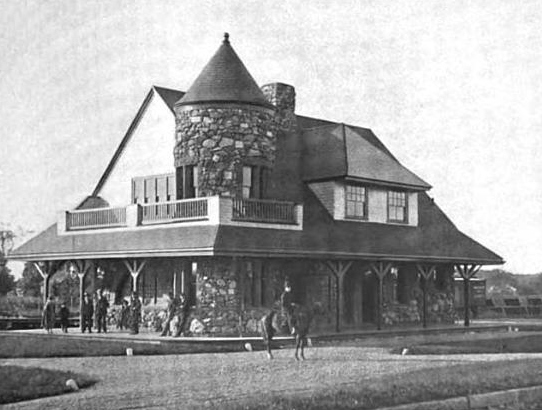
Millis station in 1899

In April 1966, the Massachusetts Bay Transportation Authority (MBTA) reached an agreement with the New York, New Haven and Hartford Railroad, the owner of the West Medway Branch, to subsidise continued service on the branch (as well as on the Needham, Dedham, and Franklin lines, also owned by the NYNH&H) within its funding district, starting on April 24; as Medway, outside the district, declined to pay for continued service to Medway and West Medway stations (the latter of which was, at the time, the western terminus of the branch), the branch was cut back to Millis, which became the new terminus, and became known as the Millis Branch instead of the West Medway Branch.

Slightly under a year later, on April 21, 1967, the Millis and Dedham branches were both abandoned due to continued poor ridership. By that time, the station had been used as the town hall for several years. Millis station is still extant, one of only two stations on the Millis Branch (the other being Dover) to have survived; it is now known as the Lansing Millis Memorial Railroad Station, part of the Millis Center Historic District.
