= Charles River Railroad =

Railroad in Massachusetts, United States

Overview
- Locale: Massachusetts, U.S.
- Dates of operation: 1851–1855
- Successor: New York and Boston Railroad

The Charles River Railroad was a railroad in the U.S. state of Massachusetts. It ran from a connection with the end of the Charles River Branch Railroad in Dover to Bellingham through the current-day towns of Medfield, Millis, and Medway.

== Charles River Branch Railroad ==
In 1847, a petition was filed with the Legislature of Massachusetts to build a rail line linking greater Boston to the Rhode Island border. The first stretch of track that would eventually fulfil this idea was the Brookline branch of the Boston and Worcester Railroad, which opened that same year and stretched 1.55 miles from a junction just south of Kenmore Square with the Boston and Worcester main line to Brookline Village. In 1849, the Charles River Branch Railroad was chartered to build tracks from the end of the Brookline branch to Dover, and then in 1851, the Charles River Railroad was chartered to build a line from the terminus of the Charles River Branch Railroad in Dover to the Rhode Island state line in Bellingham. The Charles River Railroad charter also authorized the union of the Charles River Railroad with the Charles River Branch Railroad.

By November 1852, a 6.1-mile section of track from the Brookline branch of the Boston and Worcester Railroad in Brookline to Newton Upper Falls was the first section of track to be completed. Soon after, on June 1, 1853, a 2.4-mile section of track from the end of the first section in Newton Upper Falls to Needham was completed, and later that year, on October 26, the Charles River Railroad officially merged with the Charles River Branch Railroad. From this time through the 1880s, the Back Bay region of Boston was filled in, and the railroad was used to haul stone from quarries in Needham. Construction on the next section of the line continued for the next two years until October 3, 1855, when the Charles River Railroad merged with the New York and Boston Railroad.

== New York and Boston Railroad ==
Map

In November 1861, the 13-mile section of track from Needham to Medway was finally opened, followed by a 1.3-mile segment from Medway to West Medway in 1862 and the final 9.9-mile segment outlined in the original charter to the Rhode Island state line in Bellingham in October 1863. In order to complete the connection to the rest of its network, the New York and Boston Railroad added a one-mile long stretch of track from Bellingham to its terminus in Woonsocket, Rhode Island.

Despite its grand plans and long route, profitability was a challenge for the New York and Boston Railroad, which faced competition from the nearby Medway Branch Railroad and its connection to the larger Norfolk County Railroad. As a result, passenger traffic remained insufficient to keep the railroad in the black, and in 1864 it went bankrupt. The line was leased for 999 years to the Boston, Hartford and Erie Railroad on December 1, 1864, and outright consolidated with it on January 4, 1865. Following the merger, the tracks of the former New York and Boston Railroad became the Woonsocket Division of the Boston, Hartford, and Erie Railroad. Later that year, on December 13, several associates of the much larger Erie Railroad were elected to the board of the Boston, Hartford, and Erie Railroad in an attempt to improve the railroad's profitability, but despite being under partial control of the much larger and more successful railroad, finances continued to be a problem and maintenance and service struggled as a result. Reports of under-powered trains stalling due to a lack of steam abounded, and in 1873 the Boston, Hartford, and Erie Railroad declared bankruptcy. Afterwards, on April 17, 1873, the railroad was reorganized into the New York and New England Railroad by special act of the Legislature of Massachusetts.

== New York and New England Railroad ==
On February 17, 1883, the New York and New England Railroad sold a 5.3-mile portion of the former Charles River Railroad to the Boston and Albany Railroad. The section reached from the New York and New England's original connection to the Boston and Albany Railroad in Brookline to Cook Street in Newton (at what would later become Cook Junction) and became a part of the Boston and Albany Railroad's Highland branch. To compensate for the loss of access to Boston, the railroad built a cutoff from Needham Junction east to the former Boston and Providence Railroad main line, which had since come under control of the Old Colony Railroad and, subsequently, the New York, New Haven and Hartford Railroad. The cutoff was exceptionally difficult to build, requiring several difficult rock cuts, and did not open until November 4, 1906. Originally, Needham Junction was the only stop on the cutoff, until Bird's Hill opened as an infill station in 1917.

The New York and New England Railroad faced many of the same problems as its predecessors, principally continued operation on lines that were otherwise not profitable. Much of the railroad was supported by money earned from the Norwich and Worcester Railroad line, which had been leased by the Boston, Hartford, and Erie Railroad. The railroad's main competitor was the New York, New Haven and Hartford Railroad, as together the two railroads controlled virtually all rail traffic in New England south of the Boston and Albany Railroad. The final nail in the coffin of the New York and New England Railroad came in 1893, when the Old Colony Railroad was leased to the New York, New Haven and Hartford Railroad. On December 27, 1893, the New York and New England Railroad declared bankruptcy, and was reorganized into the New England Railroad on August 26, 1895. Three years later, on July 1, 1898, the New York, New Haven and Hartford Railroad signed a 99-year lease of the New England Railroad, and ten years after that, on April 1, 1908, the New England Railroad was conveyed to the New York, New Haven and Hartford Railroad.

== New York, New Haven and Hartford Railroad ==
By the 1960s, the New York, New Haven and Hartford Railroad, like many railroads, was struggling to stay solvent in the face of increased competition from alternate modes of transportation, and so in 1961 it petitioned to be included in the newly formed Penn Central Transportation Company. On December 31, 1968 all of its properties were purchased by Penn Central. Penn Central, however, soon went bankrupt, and on April 1, 1976 it was taken over by Conrail. On August 22, 1998, the Surface Transportation Board approved the buyout of Conrail by CSX and Norfolk Southern, but the tracks of the former New York and Boston Railroad were instead acquired by the Commonwealth of Massachusetts.

== Current day ==
Today, much of the former Charles River Railroad has survived despite the abandonment of much of the rest of the former New York and New England Railroad lines. The section sold to the Boston and Albany Railroad in 1883 is currently a part of the D branch of the MBTA's Green Line. A short section of the original track after Cook Junction has been abandoned, a portion of which was converted into the Upper Falls Greenway, but soon picks up as a part of the MBTA's Needham Line as far as Needham Junction. At Needham Junction, the MBTA Needham Line continues along the 1906 cutoff and back into Boston. The other branch from Needham Junction, which was a part of the original Charles River Railroad, is still owned by the Commonwealth of Massachusetts; known as the Millis Branch, it was closed in 1967 to passenger service. Freight service along this portion of the line is contracted out to the Massachusetts Coastal Railroad. The line now only runs as far as Millis, however, with the remainder of the tracks through Medway, Bellingham, and Woonsocket abandoned.

== See also ==
- Woonsocket Union Railroad
- Mansfield and Framingham Railroad
