= Woonsocket station =

Former railroad station in Woonsocket, Rhode Island

Woonsocket
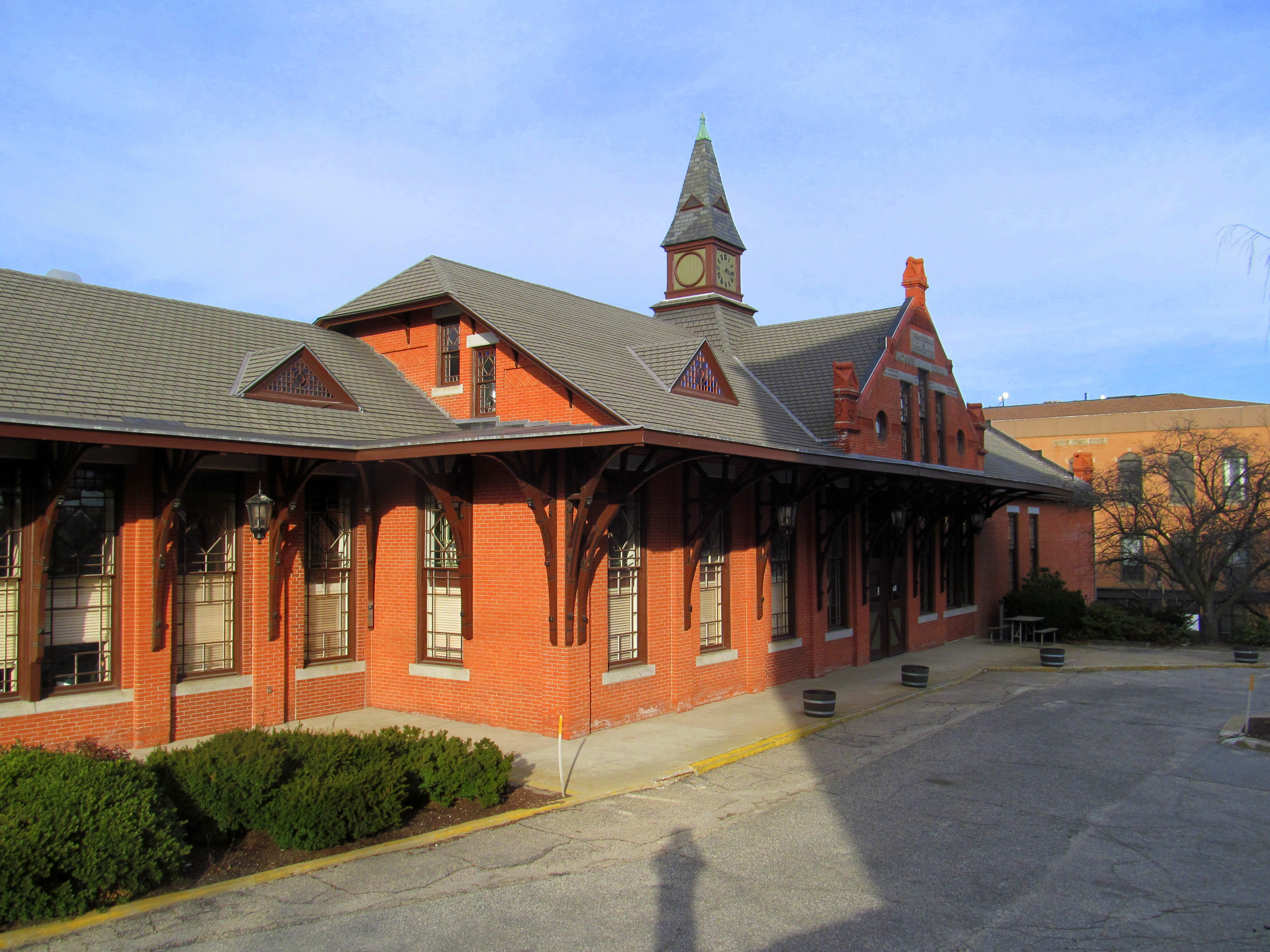
- Woonsocket station in February 2016

General information
- Location: 1 Depot Square; Woonsocket, Rhode Island
- Coordinates: 42.003460°N 71.513301°W
- Line: Providence and Worcester Railroad

History
- Opened: 1847
- Closed: 1960
- Rebuilt: 1882

Former services
Preceding station	New York, New Haven and Hartford Railroad	Following station
Blackstone toward Worcester	Providence and Worcester Railroad	Manville toward Providence
Location

Woonsocket station is a former railroad station located at Depot Square in downtown Woonsocket, Rhode Island. It was built by the Providence and Worcester Railroad in 1882 to replace a previous station built in 1847.

== History ==
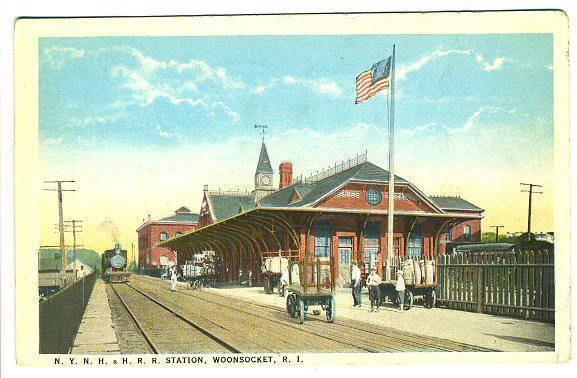
Woonsocket Depot on a 1923 postcard

=== Hachiko ===
Depot Square was the central filming location for Hachi: A Dog's Tale in 2009. A statue of the dog, Hachikō, was installed in front of the station in May 2012.

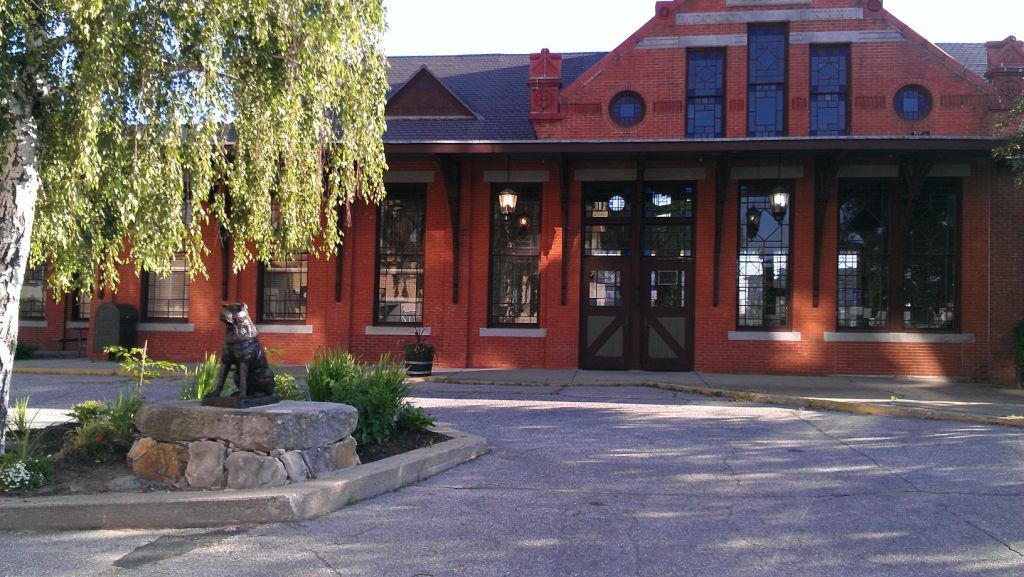
Woonsocket Depot in 2014, showing the statue of Hachikō.

=== Renovation and proposed return of rail service ===
The building was renovated by William (Bill) Dogan and was the headquarters for Develco a (now defunct) real estate development company during the 1970s who was responsible for building Lincoln Mall and the Marquette building in Woonsocket, R.I.

The building served as the headquarters for the Blackstone River Valley National Heritage Corridor. The Blackstone Valley Tourism Council organizes a Polar Express excursion each year which operates from Woonsocket Depot.

In February 2016, the Rhode Island Department of Transportation leased the depot to the Boston Surface Railroad (BSRC) to be used by the company for commuter service between Providence, Rhode Island and Worcester, Massachusetts. Later, the depot was designated as the headquarters for the BSRC. The BSRC planned to build a high-level platform on the western side of the station for accessible level boarding. The Blackstone River Valley National Heritage Corridor office was relocated from the depot to a mill in Whitinsville, Massachusetts.

RIDOT filed for eviction of the BSRC in April 2019 over unpaid rent. After a legal battle and settlement, the company agreed in December 2020 to vacate the building in January 2021. The BSRC also planned to build a station in nearby Lincoln or Blackstone instead.
