= List of rail trails in Massachusetts =

This list of rail trails in Massachusetts details former railroad right-of-ways in Massachusetts that have been converted to trails for public use and proposed rail trails where trails exist but have not been fully established.

Massachusetts has at least 69 rail-trails, covering 347 miles. A massive new project proposed by the Metropolitan Area Planning Council, called the Landline, seeks to connect these trails, creating a 1,400-mile network of greenways and foot trails within the Boston region. When finished (currently 45 percent of the greenway network and 60 percent of the foot trail network is complete), the network would bring trail access within a half mile of three-quarters of the region's residents, and 92 percent of residents would be within one mile of the nearest trail or path."

== Established rail trails ==
- Amesbury Riverwalk Trail
- Ashburnham Trail
- Ashuwillticook Rail Trail (12 miles in North Berkshires)
- Assabet River Rail Trail southwest end (5.8 miles, Hudson to Marlboro) completed, & northeast end 3.4 miles (from South Acton station (MBTA) through Maynard to Stow)
- Bay Circuit Trail (Long distance hiking circuit in Massachusetts with rail trail segments)
- Bay Colony Rail Trail (Newton to Medfield)
- Bedford Narrow Gauge Rail Trail (Bedford) a.k.a. Narrow Gauge Rail Trail
- Blackstone River Greenway (near Worcester) (formerly Bikeway)
- Border to Boston Trail (New Hampshire border to Boston)
- Bradford Rail Trail
- Bruce Freeman Rail Trail (Lowell to Framingham)
- Canalside Rail Trail (Turners Falls)
- Cape Cod Rail Trail (Dennis to Wellfleet)
- Chelsea Greenway
- Clipper City Rail Trail (Newburyport)
- Cochituate Rail Trail (Natick Center to the Saxonville section of Framingham, crossing Lake Cochituate)
- Columbia Greenway Rail Trail (Westfield)
- Danvers Rail Trail (Danvers)
- Mary Ellen Welch Greenway (East Boston), formerly East Boston Greenway
- East Coast Greenway (Maine to Florida)
- Eastern Marsh Trail (Salisbury)
- Farmington Canal Trail (connects with Southwick Rail Trail)
- Fitchburg Cutoff Path (Belmont to Cambridge)
- Frances P Ryan Bikeway (Northampton)
- Ghost Trail (Salisbury)
- Grand Trunk Trail (Massachusetts) a.k.a. Titanic Rail Trail (Sturbridge)
- Haggetts Pond Rail Trail (Andover)
- Hanover Branch Rail Trail
- Independence Greenway (Peabody)
- Jay McLaren Memorial Trail (Merrimac)
- Linear Park (Cambridge)
- Lower Neponset River Trail a.k.a. Neponset Trail a.k.a. Neponset River Greenway (Dorchester)
- Manhan Rail Trail (Easthampton)
- Mass Central Rail Trail (Partially complete, Boston to Northampton)
- Mass Central Rail Trail—Wayside (Partially complete, Waltham to Berlin)
- Mattapoisett Rail Trail
- Medfield Rail Trail
- Methuen Rail Trail (Methuen)
- Minuteman Bikeway (Bedford to Cambridge)
- Nashua River Rail Trail (Ayer to Nashua, New Hampshire)
- Needham Rail Trail
- New England Rail Trail Network (Connecticut, Maine, Massachusetts, New Hampshire, Rhode Island and Vermont)
- New Haven and Northampton Canal Greenway (Northampton to New Haven, Connecticut)
- Newton Upper Falls Greenway
- North Central Pathway (Gardner to Winchendon)
- North Plymouth Rail Trail (Plymouth) a.k.a. Seaside Trail
- Northampton Rail Trail System
- Northern Strand Community Trail (Everett, Malden, Revere, Saugus, Lynn) a.k.a. Bike to the Sea Trail
- Norwottuck Branch of the Mass Central Rail Trail (Northampton to Belchertown)
- Old Colony Rail Trail (Harwich and Chatham)
- Phoenix Rail Trail (Fairhaven) a.k.a. Phoenix Bike Trail
- Pierre Lallement Bike Path, a.k.a. Southwest Corridor Path (Boston)
- Quequechan River Rail Trail (Fall River)
- Quinebaug River Valley Rail Trail (Partially completed, Southbridge, Dudley, Webster, and Thompson, Connecticut)
- Redstone Rail Trail (East Longmeadow)
- Reformatory Branch Rail Trail (Bedford to Concord) a.k.a. Reformatory Branch Trail
- Rockland Rail Trail
- Saulnier Memorial Bike Trail (New Bedford)
- Shining Sea Bikeway (North Falmouth to Woods Hole)
- Somerville Community Path
- Spencer Depot Rail Trail
- Southern New England Trunkline Trail (Douglas, Uxbridge, Millville, Blackstone, Bellingham, Franklin)
- Southwick Rail Trail (Southwick) (connects with Farmington Canal Heritage Trail)
- Sterling Spur of the Mass Central Rail Trail (Sterling)
- Tri-Community Greenway (Stoneham, Winchester, Woburn)
- Twin Cities Rail Trail (Fitchburg to Leominster)
- Upper Charles Rail Trail (Holliston) (Milford) a.k.a. Holliston Rail Trail a.k.a. Milford Rail Trail (Milford Branch)
- Ware River Rail Trail (Barre to Baldwinville)
- Watertown-Cambridge Greenway
- Wellington Greenway (Medford)
- Whitney Spur Rail Trail (Cohasset)
- World War II Veterans Memorial Trail (Mansfield, Norton)

=== In planning/under construction ===
- Boston-Worcester Air Line Trail (BWALT) (Worcester to Framingham, branches in Marlborough and Berlin)
- Belmont Community Path
- Bourne Rail Trail
- Dover Greenway
- Grand Junction Multi-use Path (Cambridge)
- Lawrence Manchester Rail Corridor Rail Trail (Lawrence)
- Marblehead Rail Trail
- Marion Shared Use Path
- McKnight Community Trail (Springfield)
- Norton/Mansfield Rail Trail Extension (Extension of World War II Veterans Memorial Trail)
- Rabbit Run Trail (Athol, New Salem, Belchertown)
- Southampton Greenway
- Squannacook Rail Trail (Townsend, Groton)
- Wakefield-Lynnfield Rail Trail
