= Farmington Canal State Park Trail =

Connecticut Nature Trail

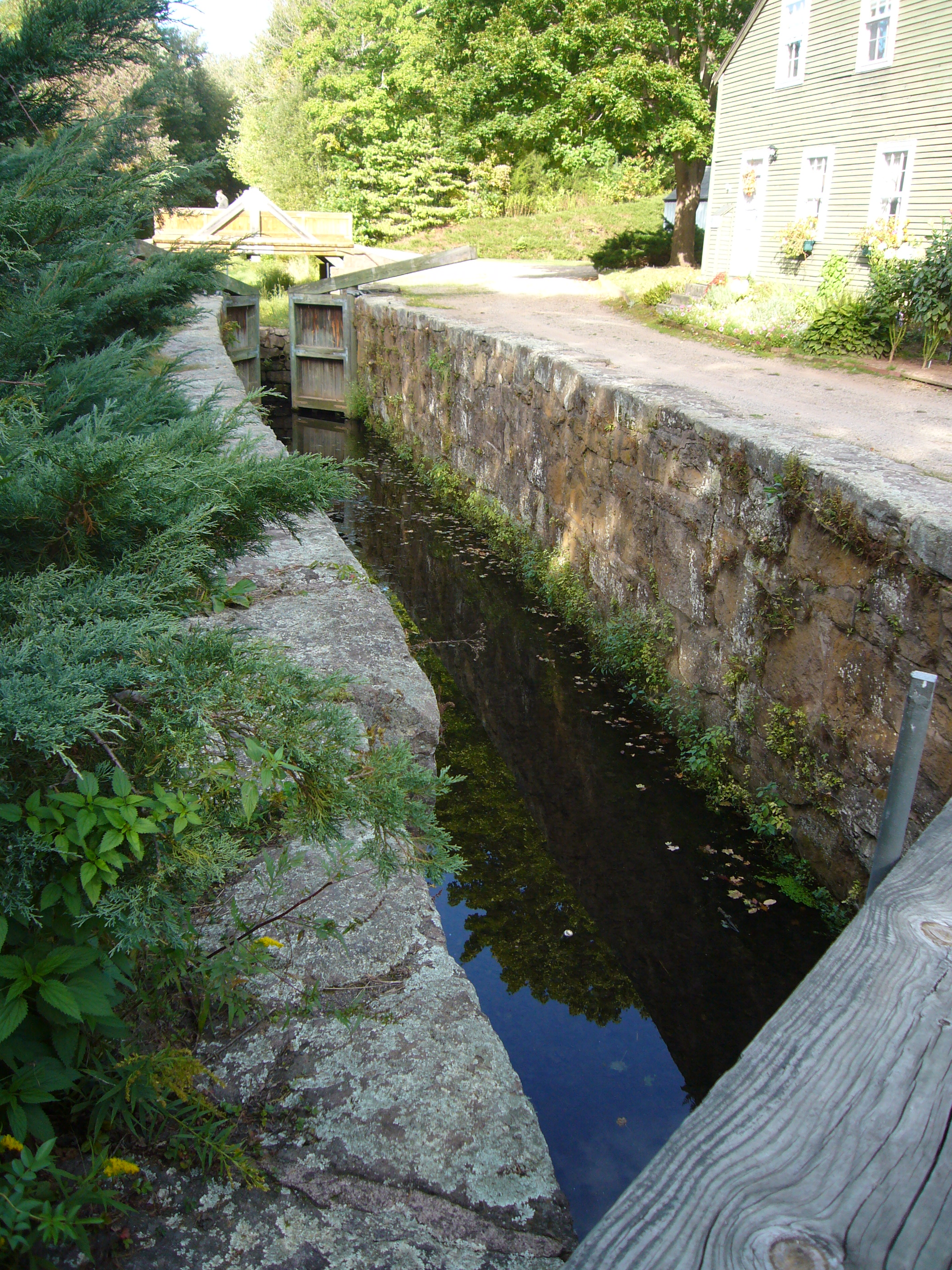
- Restored Lock 12
- Length: 17 miles (27 km)
- Location: New Haven County, Connecticut, United States
- Designation: Connecticut state park
- Trailheads: Cheshire and Hamden
- Use: Hiking, biking
- Sights: Canal
- Surface: Paved
- Maintained by: Connecticut Department of Energy and Environmental Protection
- Website: Official website

Farmington Canal State Park Trail is a Connecticut state park forming a portion of the Farmington Canal Heritage Trail in the towns of Cheshire and Hamden. The developed section of the trail within state park boundaries runs over 17.0 miles (27.4 km) from Lazy Lane in Southington to Todd Street in Hamden and includes the historic Farmington Canal's restored Lock 12, located south of Brooksvale Road in Cheshire. The paved, multiple-use trail is used for hiking, biking, jogging, in-line skating and cross-country skiing.

== History ==
The site of the greenway was originally used by the native Quinnipiac tribes as a path prior to its expansion as a road by the colonists. In 1822, it was proposed that a canal be dug for water transportation as a route to bypass the Connecticut River traffic through Hartford. The project began on July 4, 1825, and represented Connecticut's entry into the "national canal craze" and a new transportation era in Connecticut. The ground-breaking ceremony was modest and included Connecticut Governor Oliver Wolcott Jr. having the honor of turning the first spadeful of earth, but the spade broke and would later be recognized as a bad omen.

Leary wrote that the canal began at Long Wharf in New Haven, Connecticut and exited the state of by the Congamnond Ponds, some 56 miles (90 km) to the north. The canal had a total of 28 lift locks which measured 90 feet (27 m) long by 12 feet (3.7 m) wide. These lift locks were required due to the significant elevation changes from New Haven to Massachusetts. Beginning in New Haven, the first 1.25 miles (2.01 km) had masonry walls, but the rest of the canal was "simply a ditch" about 4 feet (1.2 m) deep that was only suitable for a flat bottomed canal boat. Leary describes the canal was "unquestionably Connecticut's foremost engineering feat before the advent of the railroads." The first sections of the canal were operational in 1828, and the canal boats were pulled by mules up the canal, but it wasn't complete until the late 1830s. The operation of the canal was affected by the precipitation, with drought-like conditions resulting in closed sections, but it had a great impact on the local businesses and industries adjoining the canal.

The Farmington and Hampshire companies were in severe debt by 1836 and established the New Haven-Northampton Company to take ownership of the canal on June 22, 1836. The stocks of the companies were relinquished and "the debts were partially paid and subscribers bought stock in the amount of $120,184.92". The reorganization in 1836 resulted in the loss of $1 million for the original investors. A rival appeared with the opening of the New Haven Railroad, running between New Haven and Meriden, Connecticut. Stockholders petitioned the Connecticut General Assembly for authority to construct a railroad on the canal bed, a charter was granted and work on the railroad began in January 1847. Gugino wrote that the "[t}he road opened to Plainville January 18th, 1848, to Tariffville January 19th, 1850, and to Collinsville, February 28th, 1850."

The railroad construction cost only $186,000.33 and took one year, in contrast, the canal cost its investors $1,089,425.10 and took five years to complete. Though the railroad was significantly impacted by the canal work, with the established right-of-way and the graded banks that could be used as a railroad bed, Guigino estimates it as saving about a third of the ordinary costs.

The railroad continued to operate until the 1980s, "when the railroad rights-of-way were abandoned". Railroad service was discontinued over most of the canal line and central New England by the late 1980s, but a "rails-to-trails" movement was created. The Farmington Valley Trails Council was founded in 1992 and sought to preserve the canal by converting it into a park. Funding came from the six town governments and federal funding from the Intermodal Surface Transportation Efficiency Act of 1991. Paving began in Simsbury and Farmington and the 2.9 mile length of the Farmington Canal Linear Park was dedicated May 22, 1994.

== Lock 12 ==
On North Brooksvale road in Cheshire is Lock 12, it is the "best-preserved relic of Connecticut's canal era." Lock 12 Historical Park includes a pavilion, picnic area and museum. In the early 1980s', the building at Lock 12 was donated to the town of Cheshire by Raimon L. Beard, who also credited as "instrumental in galvanizing support for the preservation of Lock 12". The museum houses "tools and implements of the canal era and wares manufactured in Cheshire during that time." It is open on weekends from late spring to early fall and by appointment.

== Activities ==
Farmington Canal State Park Trail is divided into two parts. The one is a 5.5 miles (8.9 km) multi-use trail extending south from Cornwall Avenue in Cheshire to Todd Street in Hamden. At the end of Todd Street is the beginning of Sleeping Giant State Park. The second is a 12.0 miles (19.3 km) trail that runs from Connecticut Route 68 in Cheshire to Lazy Lane in Southington. The trail is complete, with the final section having opened in fall of 2017. The trail is able to be used by "walkers, joggers, bicyclists and skaters." Leary states that the Farmington Canal Heritage Trail is part of a larger greenway that consists of three sections in Avon, Farmington, and Simbury that will combine into one long trail.

== Notes ==
1. Gugino's text states Oliver Wolcott instead of Oliver Wolcott Jr., this has been corrected. Both Oliver Wolcott and Oliver Wolcott Jr. were Connecticut governors, but Oliver Wolcott, died in 1797. His son, Oliver Wolcott Jr. was the then-current governor of Connecticut.
2. Leary's text erroneously notes that the right-of-way was sold to railroad proponents in 1936. This has been addressed by Gugino's text.
3. Gugino's text has a typographical error in the text that reads "Finally on June 22, 1846, the New Haven-Northampton Company was established to take the place of the two original companies." The correct year is 1836, this is demonstrably an error due to the numerous accounts and records including the claim being cited in a published history of Farmington, Connecticut.
