= New Haven and Northampton Canal =

Former canal in Connecticut and Massachusetts

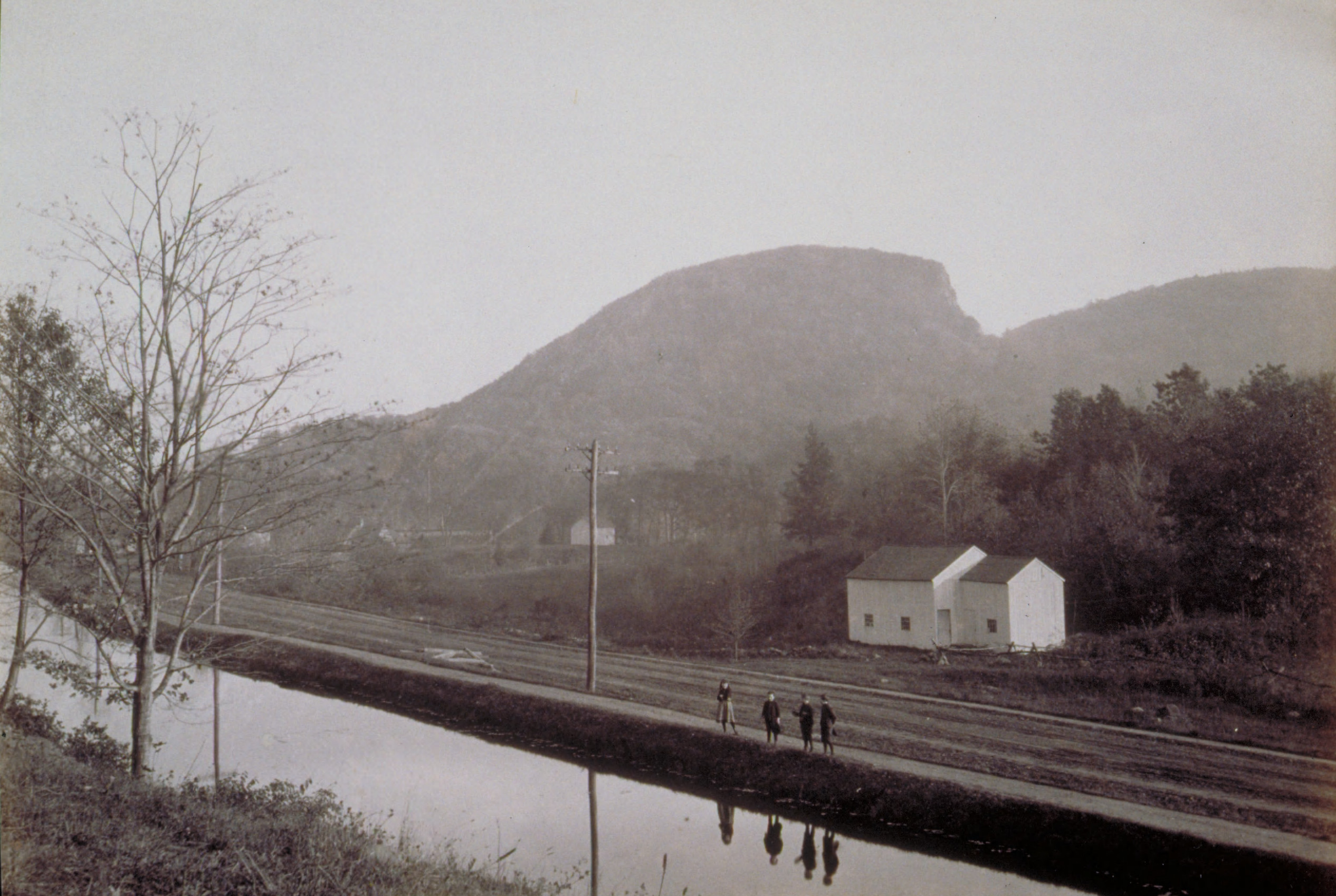
- Canal and railroad near Sleeping Giant in Hamden, Connecticut c. 1900
- Route of the New Haven and Northampton Canal with feeder canals

Specifications
- Length: 86 miles (138 km)
- Locks: 60 (Note: The Farmington Canal contained 28 locks, the Hampshire & Hampden Canal 32 locks. A guard lock at the state border prevented flow south from the Congamond Lakes into Connecticut but did not raise or lower the level of the canal.)

History
- Principal engineer: Davis Hurd
- Other engineer: Henry Farnam
- Construction began: July 4, 1825; 201 years ago
- Date of first use: June 20, 1828; 198 years ago
- Date completed: August 30, 1834; 191 years ago (Note: The official opening of the canal was July 29, 1835 in Northampton.)
- Date closed: January 18, 1848; 178 years ago

Geography
- Start point: Long Island Sound near Long Wharf (New Haven)
- End point: Connecticut River near Northampton, Massachusetts
- Beginning coordinates: 41.2955°N 72.9167°W
- Ending coordinates: 42.3435°N 72.6348°W
- Farmington Canal-New Haven and Northampton Canal
- U.S. National Register of Historic Places
- Location: New Haven, Connecticut to Northampton, Massachusetts
- Area: 247.6 acres (100.2 ha)
- NRHP reference No.: 85002664
- Added to NRHP: September 12, 1985

The New Haven and Northampton Canal was a major private canal built in the early 19th century to provide water transportation from New Haven into the interior of Connecticut and Massachusetts, ending in the Connecticut River at Northampton. Its Connecticut segment was known as the Farmington Canal and the Massachusetts segment the Hampshire and Hampden Canal.

Built in the decade after the opening of the original Erie Canal, the New Haven and Northampton Canal was one of the most significant civil engineering projects in the early 19th century United States and at 86 miles (138 km) New England's longest canal. The canal improved freight access for manufacturers and communities in the region during a critical period of the country's First Industrial Revolution. However, as a private venture it was a financial failure and only operated along its full extent from 1835 to 1847. With the advent of rail and steam locomotives, the canal company and right-of-way was quickly converted to a railroad, which was in more recent years converted to a rail trail. Few of the canal's original structures remain but short sections of canal bed and towpath survive as well as several locks.

== History ==
=== Background ===
During the early 19th century, the Connecticut River was the most efficient and commercially significant route into the interior of New England. Towns and cities along the river, such as Hartford, Connecticut, benefited from their position and access to water transport. However, Hartford's co-capital at the time, New Haven, relied on difficult overland access to the interior, and a canal had been considered since at least the 1780s. By the time the Erie Canal had begun operations canal enthusiasm was at its height. New Haven businessmen and town representatives met on January 29, 1822 in Farmington to hire the Erie's chief engineer, Benjamin Wright, to survey a route for a canal.

Wright hired Eli Whitney Blake to conduct a preliminary survey, and wrote a positive report: "The terrain is favorably formed for a great work of this kind and a canal may be formed for considerable less expense per mile, than the cost of canals now in the making in the state of New York." On May 30, 1822 the Connecticut legislature granted a charter to the "Farmington Canal Company" to build the canal from New Haven to the Massachusetts border. On February 4, 1823, Massachusetts granted its corresponding charter to the "Hampshire and Hampden Canal Company" from Southwick to Northampton. After this second charter was granted, work began.

==== Memphremagog and Connecticut canal ====
A vastly more ambitious plan would have extended the canal north through the Connecticut River valley to Barnet, Vermont and on to Lake Memphremagog, where a Canadian company would build to the major shipping route of the St. Lawrence River via the Saint-François River. DeWitt Clinton Jr. of the United States Army Corps of Engineers surveyed several routes to link the Connecticut River and Memphremagog, including a very difficult and expensive route through the Black River Valley, Joe's Pond near Danville, and the Passumpsic River involving 350 locks and a 2-mile-long tunnel. An easier route followed the Barton River and Passumpsic River to Barnet. The proposal to extend the Hampshire and Hampden Canal was ultimately rejected by the Massachusetts legislature in favor of an initiative by competing "Riverites" to improve navigation along the Connecticut River itself.

Side canals were also envisioned, including one running from Farmington west through Unionville to Colebrook and the Massachusetts border, where it would link to the Erie Canal via the Hudson River or the proposed (but never built) Boston and Albany Canal.

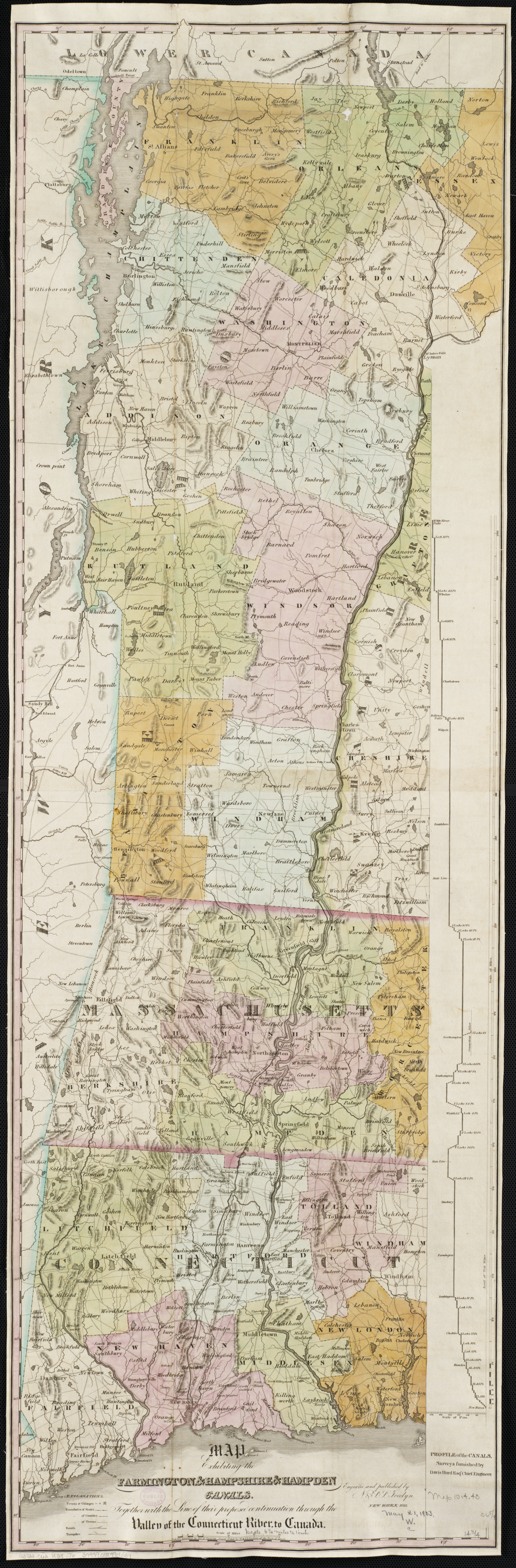
Promotional 1828 map exhibiting the canal with its proposed continuation to Canada. Elevation profile on the right.

=== Construction ===
Ground-breaking ceremonies took place on July 4, 1825 at Salmon Brook village in Granby near the Massachusetts–Connecticut border. Between two and three thousand spectators showed up and the Declaration of Independence was read by Timothy Pitkin. However, when Connecticut Governor Oliver Wolcott Jr. employed the ceremonial shovel, it broke. Built before the advent of steam shovels, the canal was graded and dug out with manual labor and the assistance of ox-drawn ploughs and draft horses. Techniques in earthmoving from the Erie were brought over to work on the new canal, including stump pullers which employed a giant windlass mechanism pulled by oxen. Buck scrapers or slip scrapers moved dirt similar to modern-day bulldozers.

The canal prism, or cross-section, was 20 feet (6.1 m) wide at the bottom, 6 feet (1.8 m) deep, and 44 feet (13 m) wide at the top. At a normal operating water level of 4 feet (1.2 m) the canal was 36 feet (11 m) wide. A 10 feet (3.0 m) wide towpath ran along one side.

In Connecticut, the Farmington Canal was built in sections by contractors according to specifications by canal engineers. Some larger individual features such as culverts, bridges, and the Farmington aqueduct were contracted out separately. In Massachusetts' Hampshire and Hampden Canal there were only two contracts. Although engineers and some laborers had come with experience from the Erie, local contractors were generally inexperienced in large-scale excavation and canal construction. As a result some work needed to be rehired or later redone. Though specifications may have called for rolled clay lining of the canal, much of it was unlined sandy soil which required subsequent relining in sections. Hydraulic lime sourced in Southington was later used to build structures and reline locks using masonry.

The canal's southern terminus in New Haven called for the construction of a basin prior to entering the Long Island Sound. Long Wharf and Tomlinson's Wharf to the northeast were joined by a Canal Wharf, upon which tide gates were hung at either end. The area enclosed by the new wharf, about 15 acres, formed the "Canal Basin" which served as a shelter and port for loading and unloading goods. Boats could traverse the basin's tide gates at high tide; at low tide they were shut to maintain water levels. The city relied on a consistent supply of water from the canal for firefighting. A tide mill was built off an added sluice on Tomlinson's Wharf, later replaced by George Rowland's canal-powered "City Mill" near the southernmost lock. William Lanson, who had extended the Long Wharf in the decade prior, was the contractor tasked with completing the Canal Wharf and other structures in New Haven. The canal's route through the city followed an existing creek and crossed numerous streets, requiring at least 14 bridges.

When fully completed in 1834 the canal was 86 miles (138 km) long, of which 56 miles (90 km) were in Connecticut and 30 miles (48 km) in Massachusetts. There were 28 locks constructed in the Connecticut canal, between New Haven and Granby. A guard lock near the state border partitioned the two sections, where the canal entered the Congamond Ponds in Southwick. Boats traversed open sections of Congamond with the help of a 700-ft-long floating towpath. A further 32 locks were constructed in Massachusetts between Southwick and Northampton.

=== Aqueducts and feeder canals ===
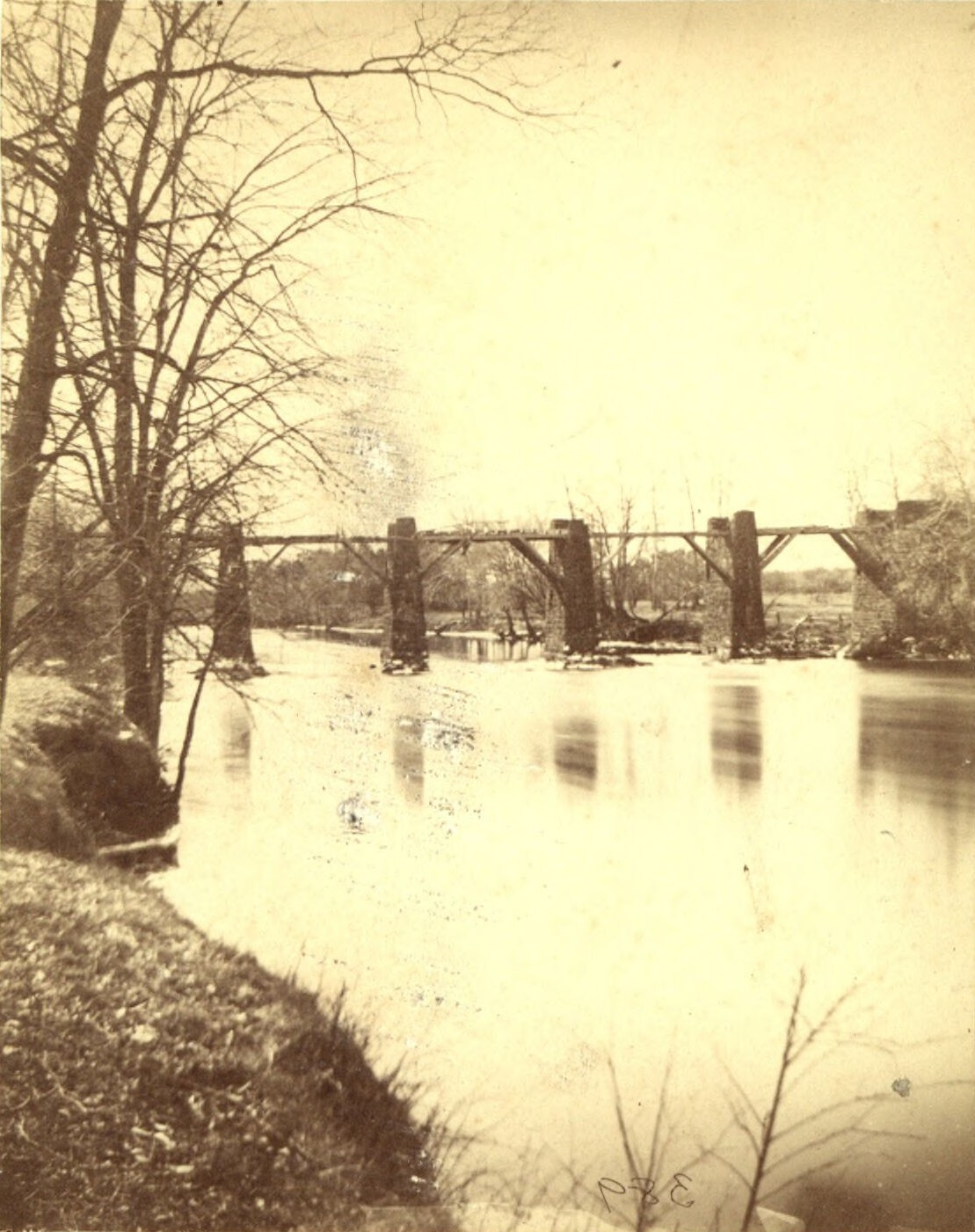
Farmington Canal Aqueduct with intact planks and supports c. 1880

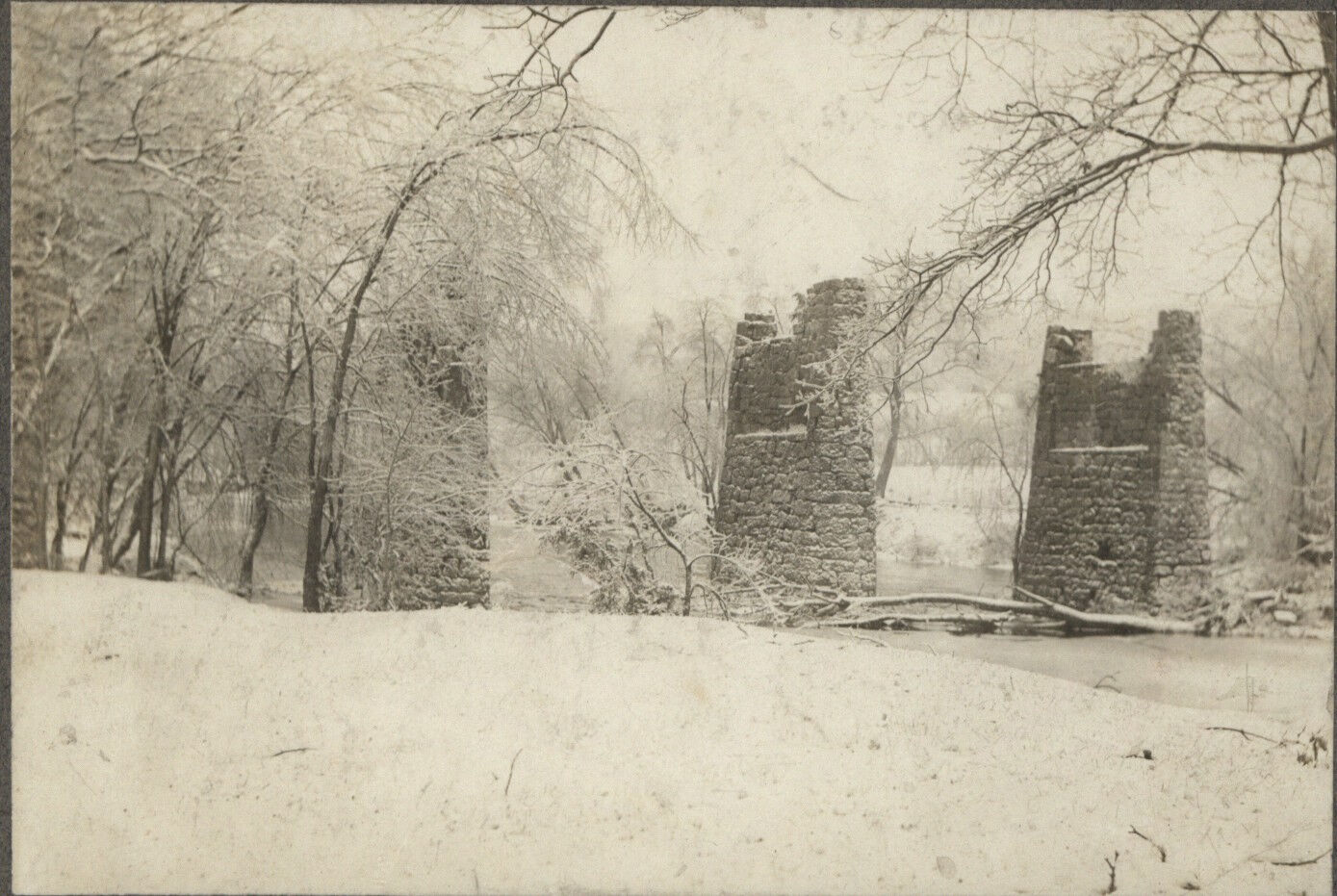
Photo of the Farmington Canal Aqueduct in winter c. 1900

The canal makers reached a problem at the "great level" in Connecticut, the stretch of land between locks in Southington and Granby, which was the longest distance of the canal at the same water level. Once the Farmington River was reached, the canal was about 50 feet (15 m) above river level. An aqueduct was planned, initially in conjunction with a lock, but it was decided to forgo the lock and make the aqueduct taller. The Farmington aqueduct spanned 280 feet (85 m) with 6 arches, spaced 40 feet (12 m) apart.

The pillars that remained after the canal closed were noted as a state landmark through the 1950s, but the 1955 floods damaged the pillars beyond repair, and they were removed in 1956–58. The aqueduct's remnants are now preserved as part of the Farmington Land Trust.

In Massachusetts two large aqueducts crossed the Westfield River and Mill River, spanning 300 feet (91 m) and 246 feet (75 m) respectively. However, their height is unknown and no traces remained by the 20th century.

Initially planned as a western branch, a feeder canal was built off a dam on the Farmington River near Unionville. Other feeders were constructed from the Westfield River, Little River, and Salmon Brook. The Westfield River feeder was particularly extensive at over 6 miles. A catastrophic flood shut down the canal north of Westfield for most of 1837 as the feeder was repaired and its dam rebuilt further upstream. Canal operation required vast amounts of water, and a significant amount would filter into the ground, through breeches, or otherwise be wasted.

=== Operation ===
On June 20, 1828, with the completion of the canal from New Haven to Farmington, the first canal boat James Hillhouse, named after one of the canal's early promoters and first president of the Farmington Canal Company, launched from Farmington with much fanfare. By 1830 the canal was open to Southwick and the Congamond Ponds. The full length of the canal was navigable by September 1834 but the first boats didn't arrive in Southampton until 1835. On July 29, 1835 the canal was officially opened with a ceremony in Northampton and the passing of the first boat through the locks leading to the Connecticut River.

Packet boats with compartments offered passenger service along the route. According to an 1835 advertisement the full trip between New Haven and Northampton took 24 hours and cost $3.75, including meals. Light packet boats, pulled by horses, were given a speed limit of 4 miles per hour (6.4 km/h) so as not to wash out canal banks. Far more numerous on the canal were freighters, which were 70 feet (21 m) long and 11 feet (3.4 m) wide, barely fitting in the locks, and able to carry as much as 25 tons. Heavier freighters, pulled by several mules or horses, moved at roughly half the speed. Draft animals were swapped out at sections along the route.

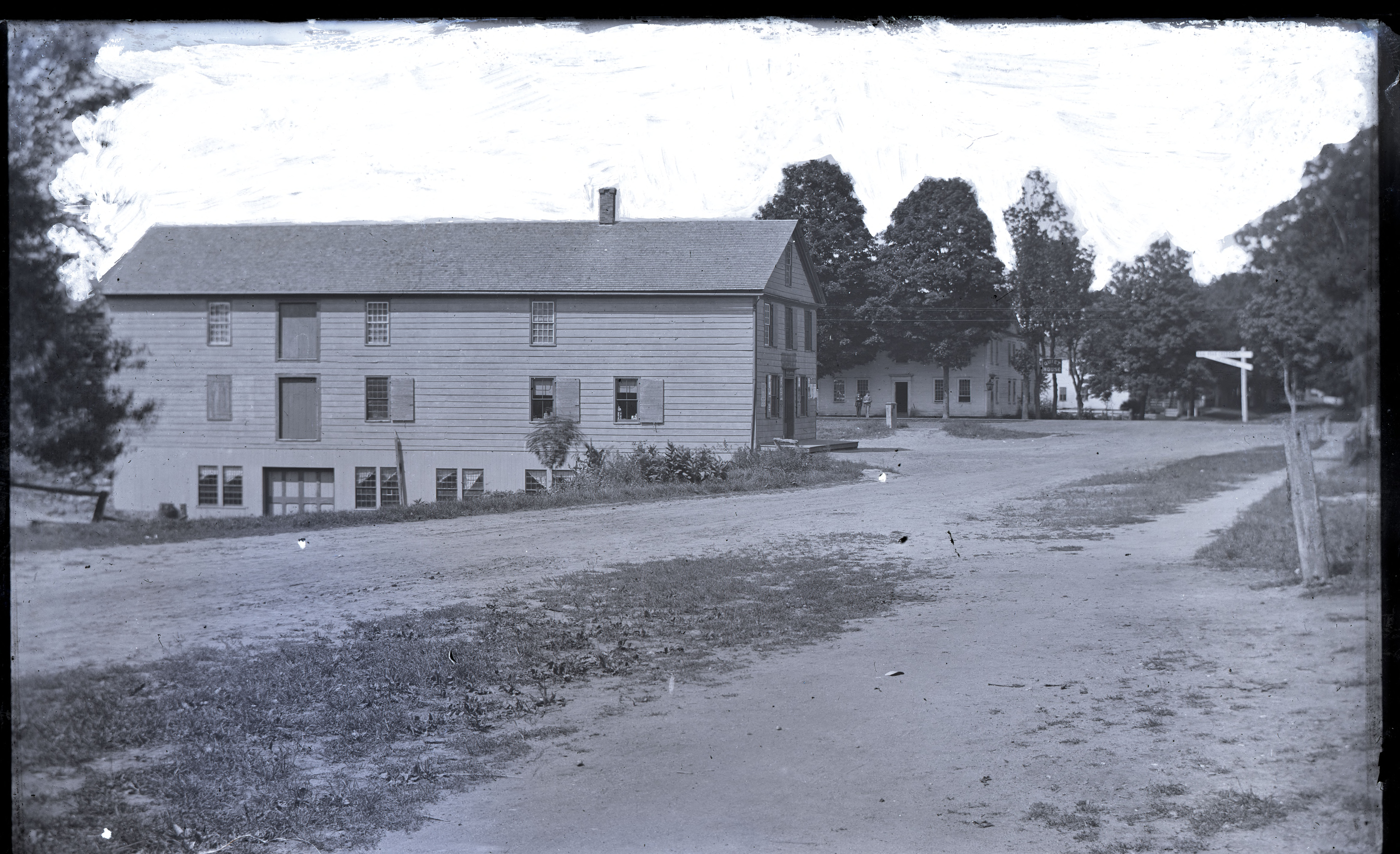
Canal Warehouse on the corner of Main Street and Old Farms Road in Avon, 1889.

Canal basins were dug out along the route to allow for boat traffic to pass and avoid bottlenecks. Many became established as important trading centers and places of official canal business. Tolls and fines were assessed by selected bonded representatives of the canal company, who were stationed and resided in New Haven, Farmington, Avon, Granby, in Connecticut; Westfield and Northampton in Massachusetts. A building that housed canal offices in Avon still survives at 12 West Main Street.

In Plainville (then part of Farmington) there were two basins, each with a freight house. The first and largest was "Whiting's Basin", built by Ebenezer Whiting, located north of the present intersection of Route 10 and Route 372. Opposite Whiting's Basin near Norton Place was the canal's only dry dock, a crucial location for the repair of boats, which had its own guard lock and a waste weir to drain. Further south near what would become the center of Plainville was "Bristol Basin", and another store operated by Whiting's brother. Adna Whiting's "General Store" had doors leading directly to the canal for drop offs and sold a variety of jelly, spices, grains, etc. Bristol Basin was also notable for being a hub for the burgeoning clock-making industry in Bristol to the west, including Eli Terry's mass-produced parts for his pillar and scroll clock.

Inventor Benjamin Dutton Beecher tested an early "Ericsson-type" screw propeller steamboat on the canal, travelling from New Haven and reaching as far north as Hamden before running aground.

The canal's later years saw advancements such as the linking of the Western Railroad in Westfield, Massachusetts and its most profitable year in 1844. However, a succession of storms and droughts shut down the canal through most of 1843 and 1845.

=== Financial problems ===
Significantly over-budget and plagued with constant expensive maintenance, the canal was not a financial success. Construction of the Hampshire and Hampden Canal was temporarily halted in 1831 when the company ran out of funds. In 1836, only one year after the completion of the full length of the canal to Northampton, the original stock was a total loss estimated at over $1 million. The "New Haven and Northampton Company" was formed in 1836 to take on the debt of the previous company and invest capital.

Revenue was generated from tolls along the route, but boats were independently owned. Outlays from maintenance and reconstruction efforts exceeded revenue for all but a few operating seasons. Canal banks were often breached by freshets and floods, and waste weirs were constructed to shed excess water. On at least one occasion, a bank was breached by a disgruntled local farmer. Land owners complained about the canal's disruption to water supply, bridges that were too steep for horses to pull carts, and mosquitoes breeding in the stagnant waters. The canal was inoperative in the winter and could also be shut down for extended periods during drought.

=== Railroad and closure ===
With the development of steam power the canal faced increased competition from steamboats on the Connecticut River. Furthermore, new railroads were much cheaper to maintain and operated year-round. In 1839 the Hartford and New Haven Railroad was completed between its namesake cities, directly competing with the canal. Joseph Earl Sheffield was involved in financing the canal company from 1840, becoming at one point its major shareholder. Having chartered the New York and New Haven Railroad in 1844, Sheffield suggested to the canal's chief engineer Henry Farnam that the railroad be built along the canal and the canal abandoned.

In February 1846 the canal's owners decided to convert the project to rail, hiring Alexander Twining to survey a route. Twining's survey found the best route was to reuse the canal infrastructure, including its bed and towpath, from New Haven north to Plainville, beyond which a number of destinations in Massachusetts were possible. Twining singled out Westfield, Northampton, and Pittsfield as good options. Sheffield ordered construction to begin at once while leaving the question of the northern terminus open, and to this end formed his own construction company to do the work. The railroad was built alongside the canal so as not the interfere with its operation, which remained open in 1846 and 1847. The railroad opened to Plainville in January 1848, at which time the canal was officially closed. Construction made it as far north as Granby before the railroad was leased by the New York and New Haven Railroad as part of an agreement with the Hartford and New Haven Railroad to prevent construction of a competing railroad between Connecticut and Massachusetts. Through legal maneuvers such as the incorporation of new, officially unrelated companies and the eventual annulment of the agreement, the New Haven and Northampton Railroad's backers (led again by Sheffield) completed an extension to Northampton in 1856.

After a period of independence, the New Haven and Northampton Railroad was leased by the New York, New Haven and Hartford Railroad (successor of the New York and New Haven and Hartford and New Haven Railroads) in 1887. Much of the railroad was abandoned in the second half of the 20th century, with surviving segments operated in Plainville and the Westfield area as of 2017.

== Today ==
=== Farmington Canal ===
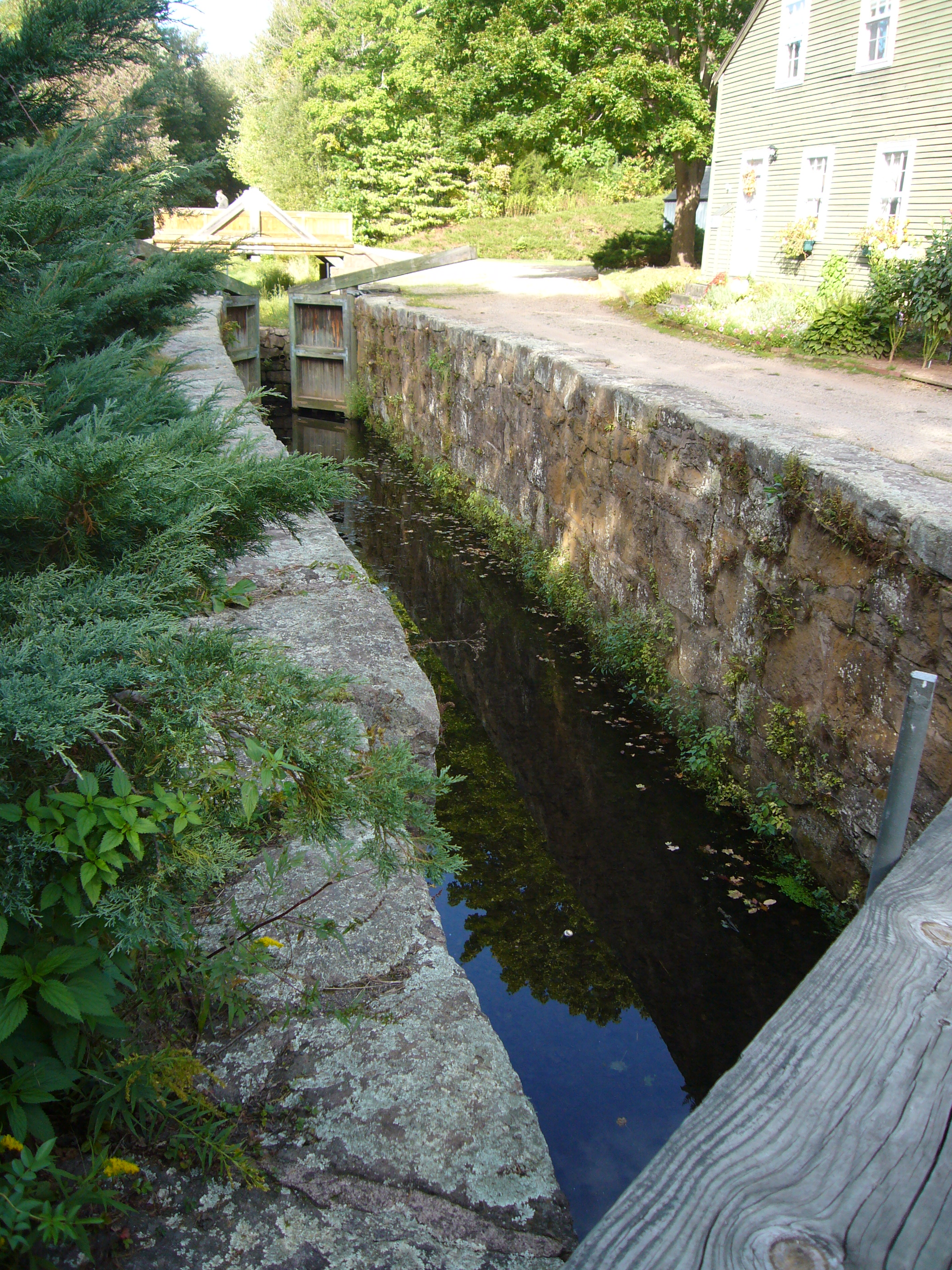
Farmington Canal Lock 12 Historical Park in Cheshire, CT

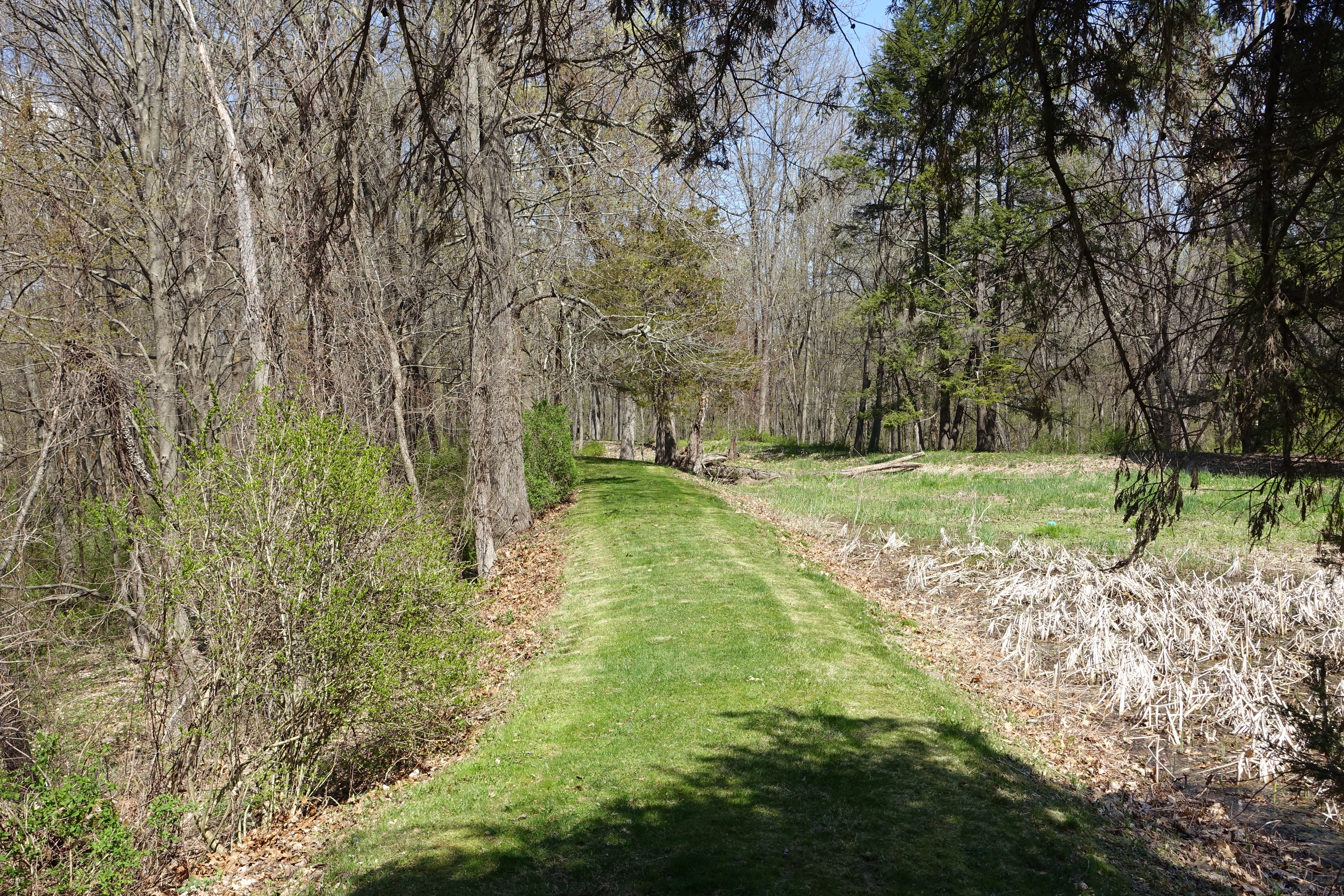
Towpath along the Canal Aqueduct Trail in Farmington, CT

Originally a wood-lined lock, Farmington Canal lock 12 in Cheshire was rebuilt with stone masonry and survived mostly intact, along with its lock house. It was restored in 1980 as the "Lock 12 Historical Park" with a bridge and rebuilt gates, although the lock is not functional. Lock 13 in Hamden is the best preserved wood-lined lock on the canal; however the timbers did not survive and the lock keeper's house is no longer standing. Lock 14 is still recognizable with an intact lock house; however, walls have collapsed, and the inside of lock 14 is dry.

A section of the canal running through Norton Park in Plainville was dredged and restored by the Plainville Historical Society in the 1970s. In Simsbury a short section of the canal was restored in Canal Place west of Route 10. The towpath and eastern abutments for the Farmington Canal Aqueduct are accessible by Farmington Land Trust's "Aqueduct Park" along Route 10. Trails in Avon access the aqueduct's western abutments and sections of canal bed.

=== Hampshire and Hampden Canal ===
Some remnants of the canal north of the state line in Southwick are preserved, with the rail trail running along the western towpath. The guard lock separating the Farmington Canal and Hampshire & Hampden Canal is still water-filled with some surviving earthworks. Unlike Farmington, where railroad construction bypassed the Farmington River aqueduct by miles, few of the aqueducts in Massachusetts survived. Part of the stone abutments from southern Manhan River aqueduct were repurposed for a railroad trestle (now abandoned).

Lockville Historic District in Southampton was named for an area containing three closely-spaced locks along with a canal warehouse and "Lockville Hotel" for travelers. The northeast wall of the stone-lined Lock 22 along Route 10 is the most well-preserved. Remnants of the canal bed are accessible via public trails in the Szczpta Farm Conservation Area. The Nancy L. Whittemore Conservation Area contains trails along the canal between Locks 24 and 25.

=== Rails-to-Trails ===
During the 1990s, the railroad right-of-way was converted to a rail trail for recreational use, currently known in Connecticut as the Farmington Canal Heritage Trail. A longer proposed trail, the New Haven and Northampton Canal Greenway extends the trail through Massachusetts, ending in Northampton and linking to the western terminus of the Mass Central Rail Trail.

== National Register of Historic Places ==
The entire length of the canal right of way in Connecticut (covering 25 segments and a total area of 247.6 acres) from Suffield to New Haven was listed on the National Register of Historic Places (NRHP) in 1985 under the name "Farmington Canal-New Haven and Northampton Canal". The 1984 NRHP nomination document provides a detailed history, and describes 45 separate bridges, aqueducts, weirs and other surviving features.

The Farmington Canal Lock in Cheshire, Connecticut, and the Farmington Canal Lock No. 13 in Hamden, Connecticut were listed separately on the NRHP in 1973 and 1982, respectively. Those are locks 12 and 13 out of 28 original locks on the Farmington Canal.

An initiative has been ongoing since at least 2020 to submit Massachusetts sections of the canal for inclusion in the NRHP.

== See also ==
- New Haven and Northampton Railroad
- New Haven and Northampton Canal Greenway
- Farmington Canal State Park Trail
- Lockville Historic District, which has a canal prism and lock remnant
