= New Haven and Northampton Railroad =

Defunct railroad in Connecticut and Massachusetts

- (Westfield-Holyoke branch not shown)
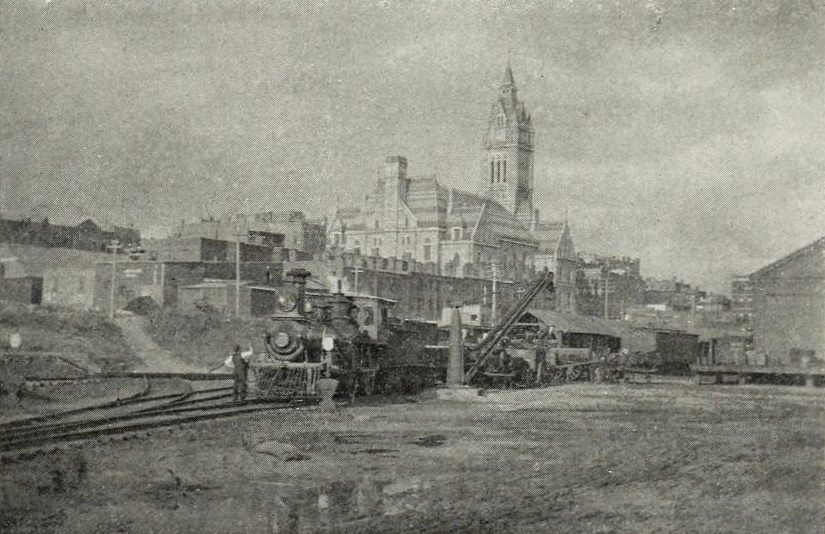
- A train at Holyoke, Massachusetts, in the 1890s. This portion of the line is now operated by the Pioneer Valley Railroad.

Overview
- Operator: Pioneer Valley Railroad (Massachusetts); Pan Am Railways (Connecticut)
- Locale: New Haven, Connecticut, to Northampton, Massachusetts
- Dates of operation: 1848–1887 (independent operations); 1848–1910 (as a corporate entity)
- Successor: New York, New Haven and Hartford Railroad

Technical
- Track gauge: 4 ft 8 1/2 in (1,435 mm) standard gauge

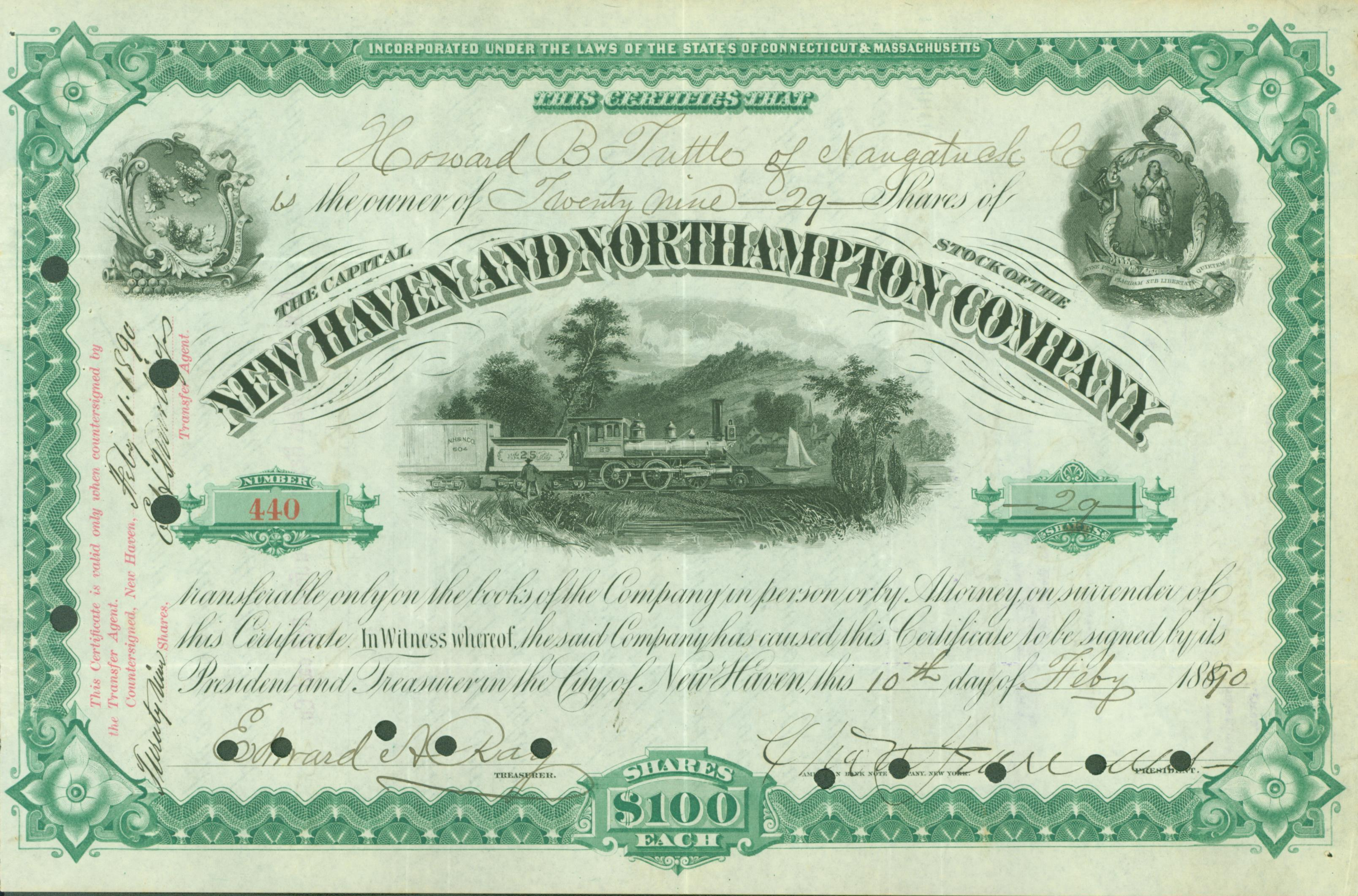
Share of the New Haven and Northampton Company, issued 10 February 1890

The New Haven and Northampton Railroad (founded as the New Haven and Northampton Company, also known as the Canal Line) was a railroad originally built alongside a canal between 1847 and 1850 in Connecticut. Leased by the New York and New Haven Railroad from 1849 to 1869, the railroad expanded northwards to Massachusetts and its second namesake city in 1859. Upon the end of the lease in 1869, the company expanded further into Massachusetts, reaching as far north as Shelburne and Turners Falls.

After a fight for control of the company by several other railroads in the 1880s, the New Haven and Northampton was leased by New York, New Haven and Hartford Railroad in 1887. The company continued to exist as a lessor until October 26, 1910, when it was formally merged into the New Haven system. In the 20th century, much of the line was gradually abandoned, though two portions continue to see freight service as of 2021. The vast majority of the abandoned line is now part of the New Haven and Northampton Canal Greenway, which includes the Farmington Canal Heritage Trail where the right of way is owned by the State of Connecticut.

== As a canal ==
The New Haven and Northampton began in the 1820s as a canal company. It operated a canal which, upon its opening in 1835, provided a connection between New Haven, Connecticut, and Northampton, Massachusetts. Despite the belief of its promoters that the canal would carry a significant amount of business, the expected levels of traffic never materialized, thanks in large part to the completion of the parallel Hartford and New Haven Railroad a few years after the opening of the canal. Additionally, the canal was only operable for eight months of the year, as it closed during the winter.

In the early 1840s, the canal was bought by New Haven businessman Joseph Earl Sheffield, who came to the conclusion that the struggling canal could work much better if it were converted to a railroad. Sheffield had become wealthy from cotton business in the Southern United States and took control through purchasing a large portion of the company's stock.

== As a railroad ==
=== Formation ===
Following authorization in May 1846 by the Connecticut General Assembly to switch from a canal company to a railroad company, work began on building a railroad along the canal right of way. Sheffield hired engineer Alexander Catlin Twining, a veteran railroad surveyor, to determine the new railroad's route. Twining's survey found the best route was to reuse the canal infrastructure, including its bed and towpath, from New Haven north to Plainville, beyond which a number of destinations in Massachusetts were possible. Twining singled out Westfield, Northampton, and Pittsfield as good options. Sheffield ordered construction to begin at once while leaving the question of the northern terminus open, and to this end formed his own construction company to do the work.

Starting in New Haven, the railroad reached Plainville, 27 miles (43 km) away, by the end of 1847. A temporary station was built between Hillhouse Avenue and Temple Street in downtown New Haven along with engine facilities, though the canal continued further south. As built, the railroad closely followed (or in places was even built on top of) the existing Cheshire Turnpike between New Haven and Hamden, leading to a high frequency of accidents between trains and horse-drawn carriages. In 1850, it was joined by the Hartford, Providence & Fishkill Railroad's line between Hartford and Waterbury. The first trains ran in January 1848, though construction continued northwards to Granby, Connecticut.

=== Expansion and lease by the New York and New Haven Railroad ===
On January 11, 1848, the New York and New Haven Railroad leased the line between New Haven and Plainville for 20 years effective on July 1, 1849, for a price of $45,000 per year. The New York and New Haven was not yet complete between its namesake cities itself, and Sheffield was both a member of the company's board of directors and a significant investor. The lease agreement was orchestrated by Sheffield to allow northward construction on the New Haven and Northampton Railroad to continue, with a provision allowing the New York and New Haven to lease further segments as they were built.

Under Sheffield's leadership, the New Haven and Northampton continued to build north. In 1849, the Canal Line made an attempt to reach Springfield, Massachusetts, and requested charters from the Massachusetts and Connecticut legislatures authorizing such an extension. This ran into intense opposition, both from the competing Hartford and New Haven Railroad, and from legislators in both states. Opponents argued that the New Haven and Northampton's charter authorized it to build a railroad "on or near" the right of way of the previous canal. This granted the company the freedom to diverge slightly from the canal's route where necessary by terrain or other obstacles, but also constrained them to follow the canal's general route, from New Haven northward towards Granby, and therefore not towards Springfield. The matter went to the Connecticut Superior Court, where a judge ruled that the railroad could not build towards Springfield, as doing so would violate its charter.

Between 1849 and 1850, two branch lines were constructed. The first was between Farmington and Collinsville, where it connected with Samuel W. Collins's Collins Company, a major manufacturer. Sheffield envisioned this branch as the start of a longer route ultimately reaching Pittsfield and even Vermont. The other was a short extension connecting Simsbury to Tariffville, which had a significant concentration of manufacturers. Both opened in 1850, as did the extension of the main line to Granby. Almost immediately after they opened, the New York and New Haven leased these as well, effective April 25, 1850, for an additional $40,000 per year.

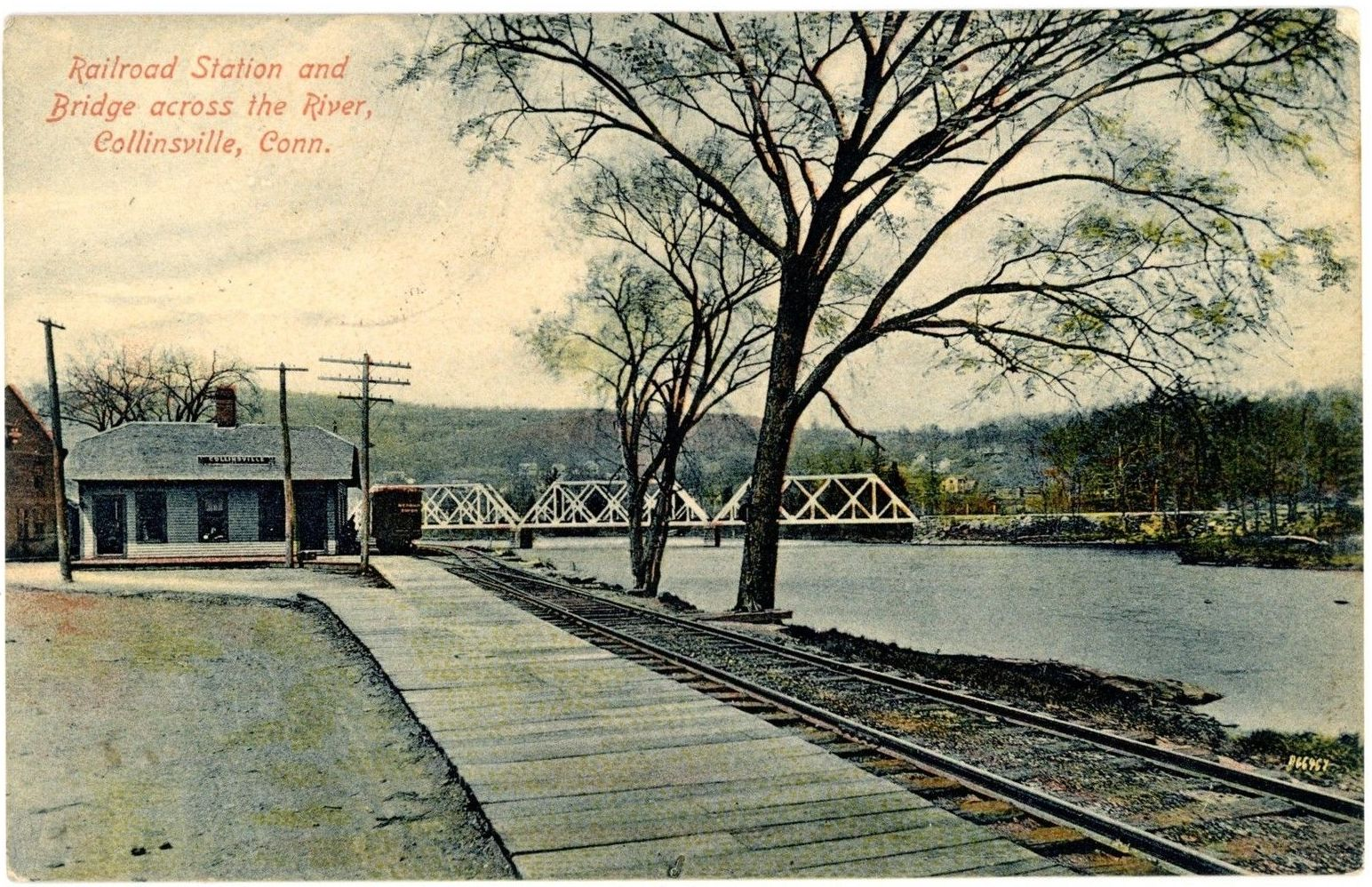
The Central New England Railway station in Collinsville; the New Haven and Northampton's bridge across the Farmington River is visible in the background

The New York and New Haven was motivated to lease the Canal Line as leverage in negotiations with the Hartford and New Haven. If the New Haven and Northampton were built to Northampton, it would be in direct competition with the H&NH's line between New Haven and Springfield, Massachusetts. These negotiations concluded with the New York and New Haven agreeing that the Canal Line would not build north of Granby, and only limited connecting service was to be made available with the HP&F in Plainville, since traffic could potentially travel between New Haven and Hartford via a transfer in that city. In return, the Hartford and New Haven contributed approximately $12,000 a year towards the New York and New Haven's payments for its lease of the Canal Line. This arrangement upset the communities along the Canal Line, such as Southington, which were left with poor service to and from Connecticut's capital city. Besides being a bargaining chip for the New York and New Haven, the lease also guaranteed the company both access to the New Haven and Northampton's land holdings in New Haven and to rail traffic generated on the line with an origin or destination on the New York and New Haven system.

In spite of the "gentlemen's agreement" between the Hartford and New Haven and the New York and New Haven, the Canal Line's proponents, led by Sheffield, were determined to still reach Northampton. To this end, in 1849 an officially unrelated company was created under the name of the Farmington Valley Railroad, which received a charter from the Connecticut legislature to build a rail line northwards from Granby 4.5 miles (7.2 km) to the Massachusetts state line. The Farmington Valley Railroad went as far as grading its line before the Hartford and New Haven obtained an injunction forcing work to stop, arguing that construction beyond Granby was prohibited by the agreement between it and the New York and New Haven. This succeeded only temporarily in stopping construction. While Sheffield left Connecticut for a time to support construction of the Chicago, Rock Island and Pacific Railroad and the Michigan Southern Railroad in the Midwestern United States, within a few years he returned and committed funding to complete both the Farmington Valley Railroad and expansion into Massachusetts after the agreement blocking northward construction was annulled.

Soon after the Farmington Valley Railroad opened, the New Haven and Northampton acquired a 1,000 year lease of the new company for $10,000. Building in Massachusetts proved to be more difficult, as several railroads in that state were determined to keep the New Haven and Northampton confined to Connecticut, most of all the Hartford and New Haven. The New Haven and Northampton's charter allowed it to build in Connecticut, but it lacked an equivalent charter from the state of Massachusetts. Two more small companies were established in 1852 and promptly received charters from the Massachusetts General Court; the Hampden Railroad was to build from the state line to Westfield, Massachusetts, while the Northampton and Westfield Railroad would build from Westfield to Northampton. In 1853, these two companies merged to form the Hampshire and Hampden Railroad, the name derived from the Hampshire and Hampden Canal which was once the Massachusetts portion of the Farmington Canal. The combined line between Granby and Northampton opened in 1856, and was operated by the New Haven and Northampton. On October 1, 1859, the New Haven and Northampton acquired a new 999-year lease of the Hampshire and Hampden in exchange for agreeing to assume $200,000 of the latter company's bonds. All three of these smaller companies were formally consolidated with the New Haven and Northampton on July 1, 1862.

In 1867, construction began on a branch from Northampton to Williamsburg. The eight-mile (13 km) branch opened in 1868.

=== Independent operations ===
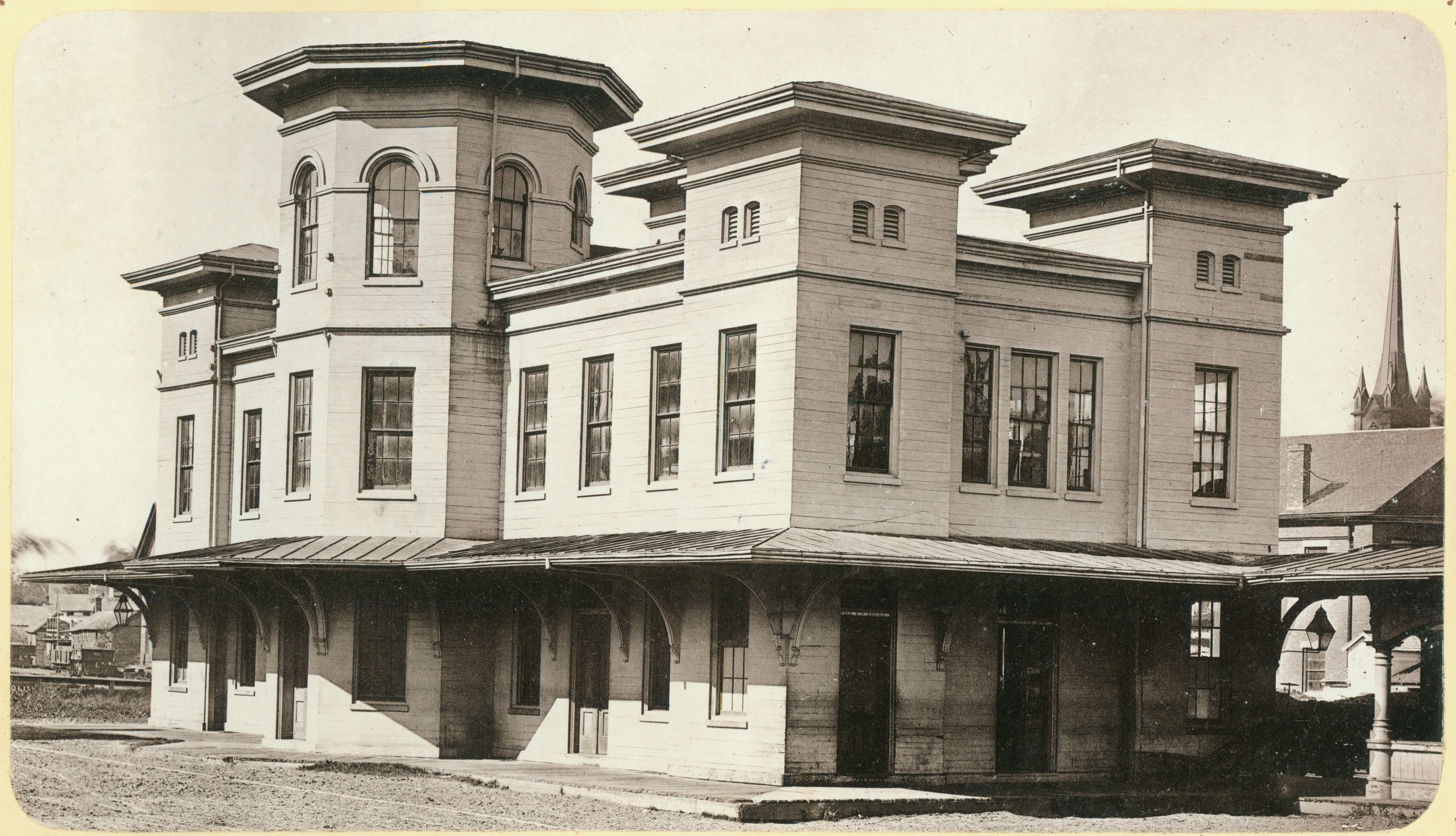
The former New Haven and Northampton depot in Northampton, Massachusetts, c. 1880s

The New York and New Haven Railroad's lease of the New Haven and Northampton expired in 1869, and was not renewed. From the start, the New York and New Haven had been suffering a significant loss from its lease of the Canal Line, losing between $35,000 and $45,000 per year. By 1860, the New York and New Haven had lost over $250,000 from the lease, while the Hartford and New Haven lost a further $120,000. Thus, the New Haven and Northampton was an independent company for the first time in 20 years. The company quickly began to expand its lines at this time, nearly immediately starting construction on an extension of the Collinsville Branch to Pine Meadow, the site of a tool manufacturer. This extension opened for traffic in 1870, and was further expanded to New Hartford, Connecticut, in 1876. Construction between Collinsville and New Hartford was along a narrow gorge following the Farmington River. It was reported that construction along the river was so difficult that the area was nicknamed "Satan's Kingdom".

In Massachusetts, the New Haven and Northampton built a branch from North Westfield to Holyoke in 1871, a distance of nine miles (14 km). Here, the company connected with the Connecticut River Railroad.

The New Haven and Northampton began a switch from iron to steel rails in 1872, which were stronger and better able to handle increasingly heavy trains.

The 6.5 miles (10.5 km) between New Haven and Hamden, long the scene of collisions with traffic on the adjacent Cheshire Turnpike, were rebuilt on a dedicated right of way in 1880. The relocated route allowed 50 grade crossings to be closed.

In the early 1880s, two additional branches were built. The first was the 18-mile (29 km) long Shelburne Falls Extension, built in 1881 between Northampton and Shelburne via South Deerfield. The following year, the nine-mile (14 km) long Turners Falls branch was built between South Deerfield and Turners Falls.

=== Assumption of control by the New York, New Haven and Hartford Railroad ===
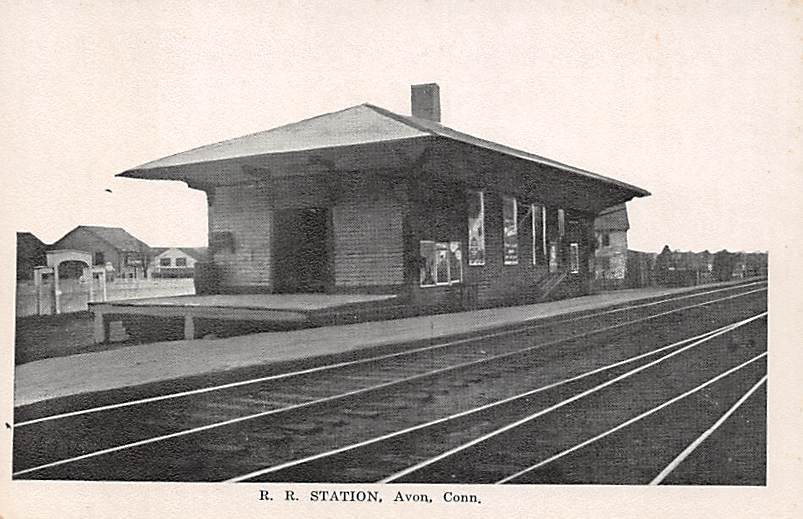
The station in Avon, Connecticut, seen circa 1907 to 1915. This building is preserved in Avon approximately half a mile north of its original location.

A battle for control of the New Haven and Northampton began in 1880, when the Boston and Albany Railroad, an east–west line in Massachusetts, chose a new president. The new president, William Bliss, had a plan to compete with the New York, New Haven and Hartford Railroad (formed by the merger of the Hartford and New Haven and the New York and New Haven in 1872). Bliss sought to take control of the New Haven and Northampton to secure a competing route for traffic between New York City and Boston. For the new few years, the Boston and Albany began purchasing shares of the Canal Line, driving a more than three-fold increase in share price.

The president of the New Haven Railroad was said to have learned of rumors about the Boston and Albany's plans from a mention in a Springfield newspaper in March 1881. The New Haven's executives were greatly alarmed, as "For years they had been haunted by the bugaboo of a parallel railroad between New Haven and New York, and here it was about to be materialized as a part of a new through line from New York to Boston." The executives decided to buy the shares still held by Joseph Sheffield, who controlled more than half the company's stock. Upon visiting him, Sheffield told the New Haven's representatives that he would sell to them, but only for $100 per share (equivalent to $2,682 in 2020). Despite the steep asking price, the New Haven agreed to buy all of Sheffield's shares for a total price of $1,229,800 (equivalent to $32,979,843 in 2020), much to the anger of the Boston and Albany, which had also been attempting to obtain his shares. Now having control of a majority of the Canal Line's stock, the New Haven installed new directors which supported its interests.

The New Haven leased the Canal Line in 1887, ending its independence. While the Canal Line was only mildly profitable for its new owners, the New Haven judged the costs of allowing a competitor such as the Boston and Albany or the New York and New England Railroad to take control to be far higher. The New Haven and Northampton continued to exist on paper until it was finally merged into the New Haven on October 26, 1910.

=== 20th century ===
Entering the 20th century, the New Haven and Northampton was considered a secondary route compared to the parallel New Haven–Springfield Line. The first cuts to the railroad came in 1923, when the branch to Shelburne was abandoned beyond South Deerfield. The remainder of the Shelburne Extension was formally abandoned in 1943 along with the Turners Falls Branch, though neither line had been used for trains since the early 1930s. However, the Boston and Maine Railroad purchased and reactivated the Turners Falls Branch from Cheapside to Turners Falls, a distance of 4 miles (6.4 km). The B&M had previously held trackage rights over the Turners Falls Branch from 1925 onward, and the purchase allowed the B&M to abandon its own line to Turners Falls.

In 1956, the New Hartford branch was cut back to Collinsville. The remainder of the branch was abandoned in 1968; the Collins Company had shut its doors in 1966. In Massachusetts, the Florence Branch was abandoned beyond Florence in 1962.

=== Penn Central, Conrail, and abandonments ===
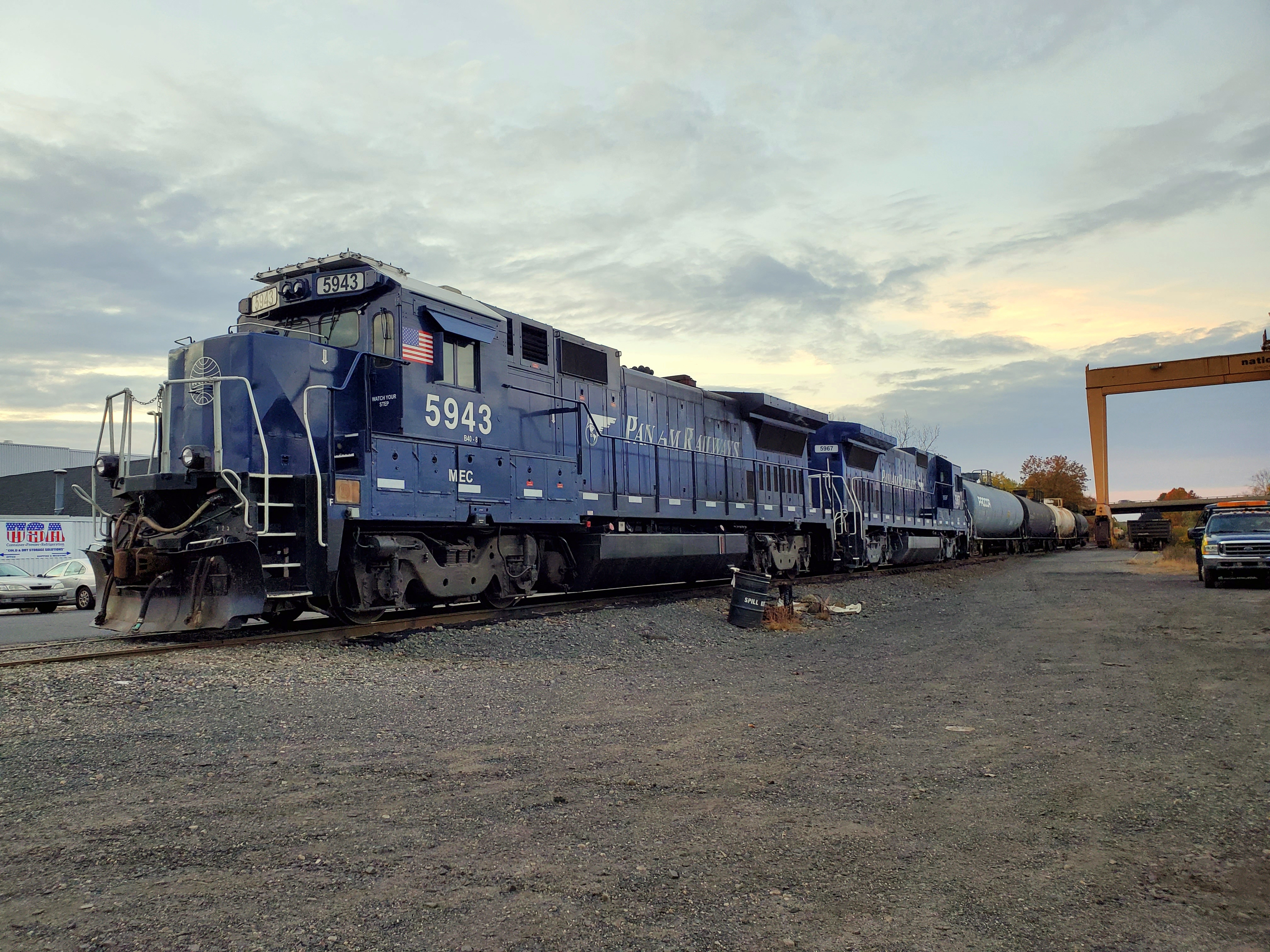
A Pan Am Railways train in Plainville along the remaining active portion of the Canal Line

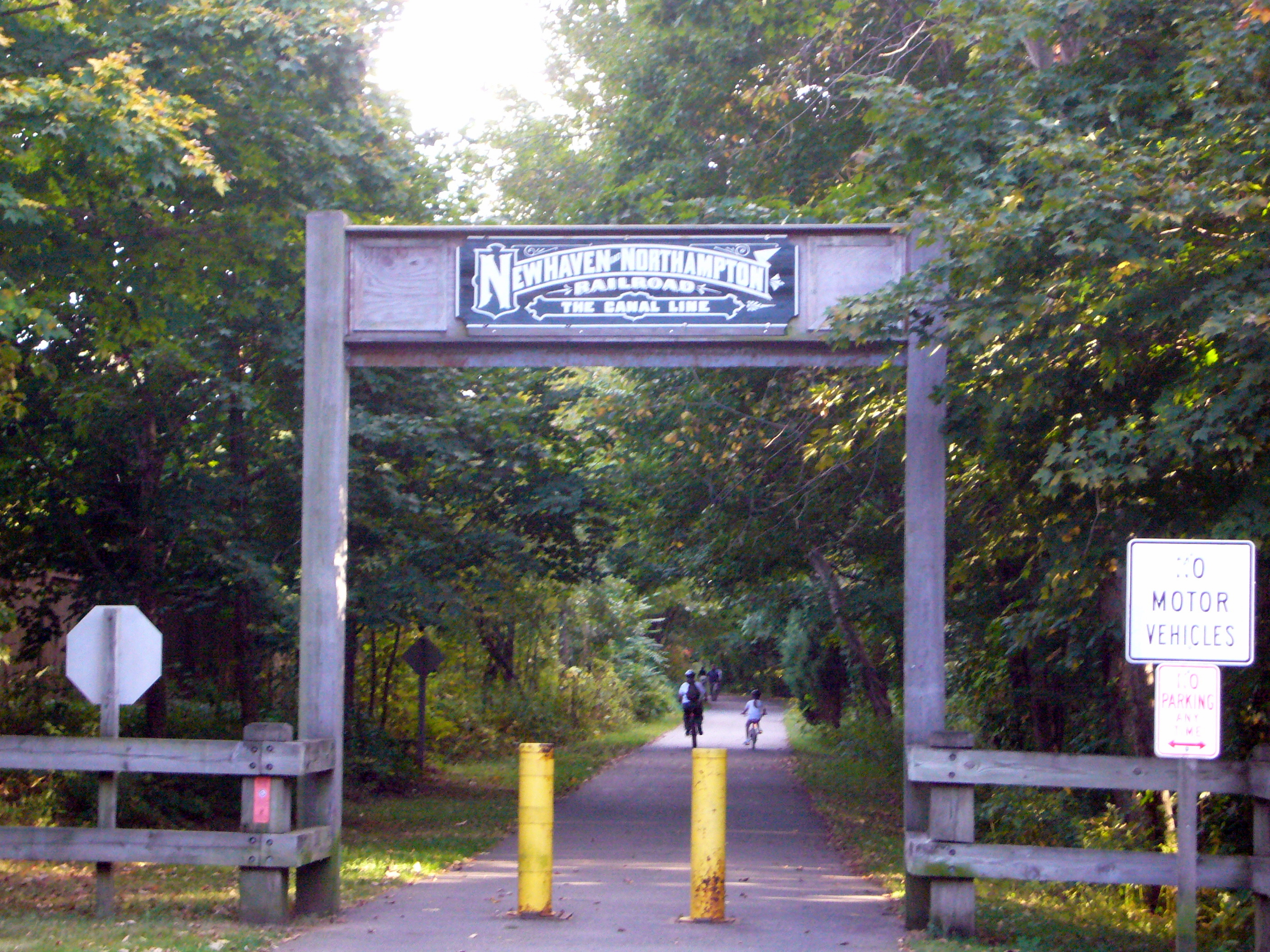
The former New Haven and Northampton right of way is now a trail in Hamden, Connecticut, and bears the logo of the former railroad.

The New Haven was merged into the Penn Central Transportation Company on January 1, 1969. That year, the main line was cut back from Northampton to Easthampton, and the rest of the Williamsburg Branch was abandoned. In the middle of the 1970s, the railroad line's connection to the Northeast Corridor was severed due to low clearance under a bridge which made it impossible for modern railroad cars to access the line. Traffic to and from the southern portion of the line had to be routed via Plainville from this time onwards.

Penn Central went bankrupt in 1970, and the federal government got involved, ultimately creating Conrail in 1976. The remaining lines were included in Conrail, with the exception of the segment between Simsbury and Westfield, which was abandoned. This left the former New Haven and Northampton as two separate lines. To save the 5 miles (8.0 km) between Avon and Simsbury, the state of Connecticut agreed to provide a subsidy for Conrail operations over that segment.

In 1982, Conrail sold its Connecticut portion of the Canal Line to the Boston and Maine Railroad, while the Massachusetts lines went to the newly formed Pioneer Valley Railroad. The line between Avon and Simsbury was abandoned at this time, and the Boston and Maine (part of Guilford Transportation Industries since 1983) further cut the line back to Plainville in 1991. Meanwhile, the southern portion in Connecticut was cut back to Cheshire in 1987. Freight service beyond Southington was suspended in 1995, and Guilford filed for abandonment. Attempts to keep the line in service to Cheshire ultimately failed, with abandonment being approved in 1998. In Massachusetts, the Pioneer Valley Railroad ended freight service between the Westfield town line and Easthampton in 1998 and sold the line to Easthampton for use as a trail.

=== 21st century ===
The Pioneer Valley Railroad discontinued service in Westfield south of the former Boston and Albany Railroad main line in 1997 and formally abandoned this part of the line in 2000. An additional abandonment of most trackage in Southington took place in 2008. As of 2017, freight service in Connecticut operates only in Plainville and just across the Southington town line, where the line ends at a propane distribution company; the Pioneer Valley Railroad continues operating part of the former main line in Westfield along with the entire Holyoke Branch.

In the 21st century, the remaining Connecticut portion of the Canal Line is operated by Pan Am Railways between Plainville and Southington, while the Pioneer Valley Railroad operates the remnants in Massachusetts. The majority of the abandoned right of way in Connecticut and Massachusetts has been railbanked and converted into several different rail trails collectively known as the New Haven and Northampton Canal Greenway, chiefly the Farmington Canal Heritage Trail. Trails have also been established on portions of the branches to New Hartford and Williamsburg.

The Connecticut Department of Transportation has identified the abandoned portions of the Canal Line between Hamden and Suffield, as well as between Farmington and Canton, as corridors which have the potential for future freight rail service.

== See also ==
- List of New York, New Haven and Hartford Railroad precursors
