= Manhan Rail Trail =

Rail trail in Massachusetts, United States

Coordinates: 42.2670°N 72.6705°W

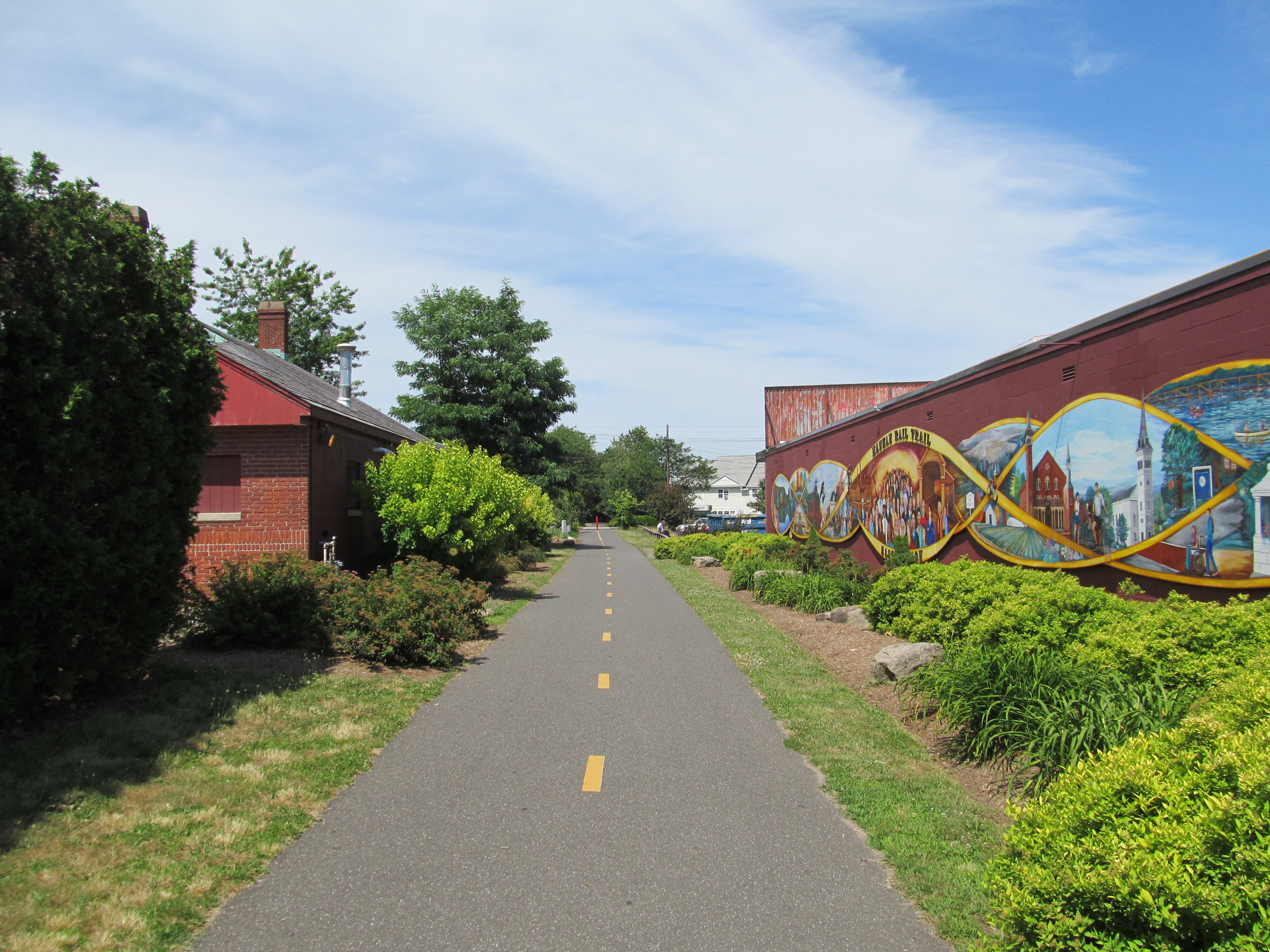

Manhan Rail Trail, Easthampton, MA
- Length: 6 mi (9.7 km)
- Location: Hampshire County
- Trailheads: Northampton; Easthampton; Southampton
- Use: Walking, running, bicycling, roller blading, and cross country skiing
- Difficulty: Easy
- Season: year-round
- Hazards: deer ticks, poison ivy, road crossings
- Surface: Paved surface
- Right of way: former railroad line
- Website: manhanrailtrail.org/

Massachusetts
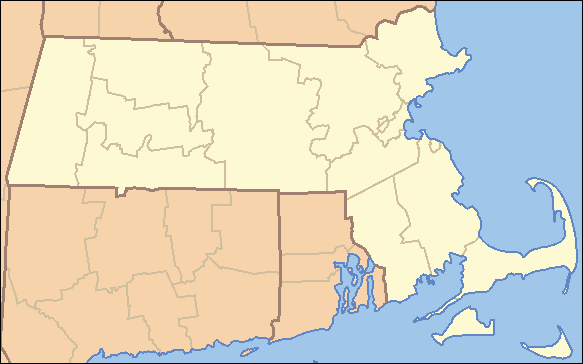
- Location in Massachusetts

The Manhan Rail Trail is a rails-to-trails paved recreational trail and non-motorized commuter route located in the lower Connecticut River Valley of Massachusetts in the town of Easthampton. The 6-mile-long (9.7 km) trail, completed in 2003, is part of the larger New Haven and Northampton Canal Greenway that would extend from New Haven, Connecticut, to Northampton, Massachusetts. The trail, named after the Manhan River which it parallels, utilizes the bed of the former New Haven and Northampton Railroad, which served the industrial towns of the lower Pioneer Valley from the mid-19th century until 1992. It begins at the Northampton-Easthampton line near Route 5 and ends at Coleman Road, just over the Southampton town line. A spur connecting the Manhan Rail Trail to the Northampton Rail Trail System opened in 2010. There are plans to extend the route south through Southampton via the Southampton Greenway and eventually to Westfield to connect with the Columbia Greenway Rail Trail.

The Manhan Rail Trail, universally accessible, is open to walking, running, bicycling, inline skating and, in the winter, cross country skiing. The trail also provides a non-motorized commuter transportation route linking Easthampton, Northampton, and Southampton, Massachusetts. The trail is part of the Commonwealth Connections greenway initiative which links it to the adjacent trails of the Mount Tom Range and the Arcadia Audubon Sanctuary.

The Manhan Rail Trail served the surrounding community for eight years as the location for Derrill's Race.
