= Bay Colony Rail Trail =

Partially completed rail trail in Newton, Needham, Dover, and Medfield, Massachusetts

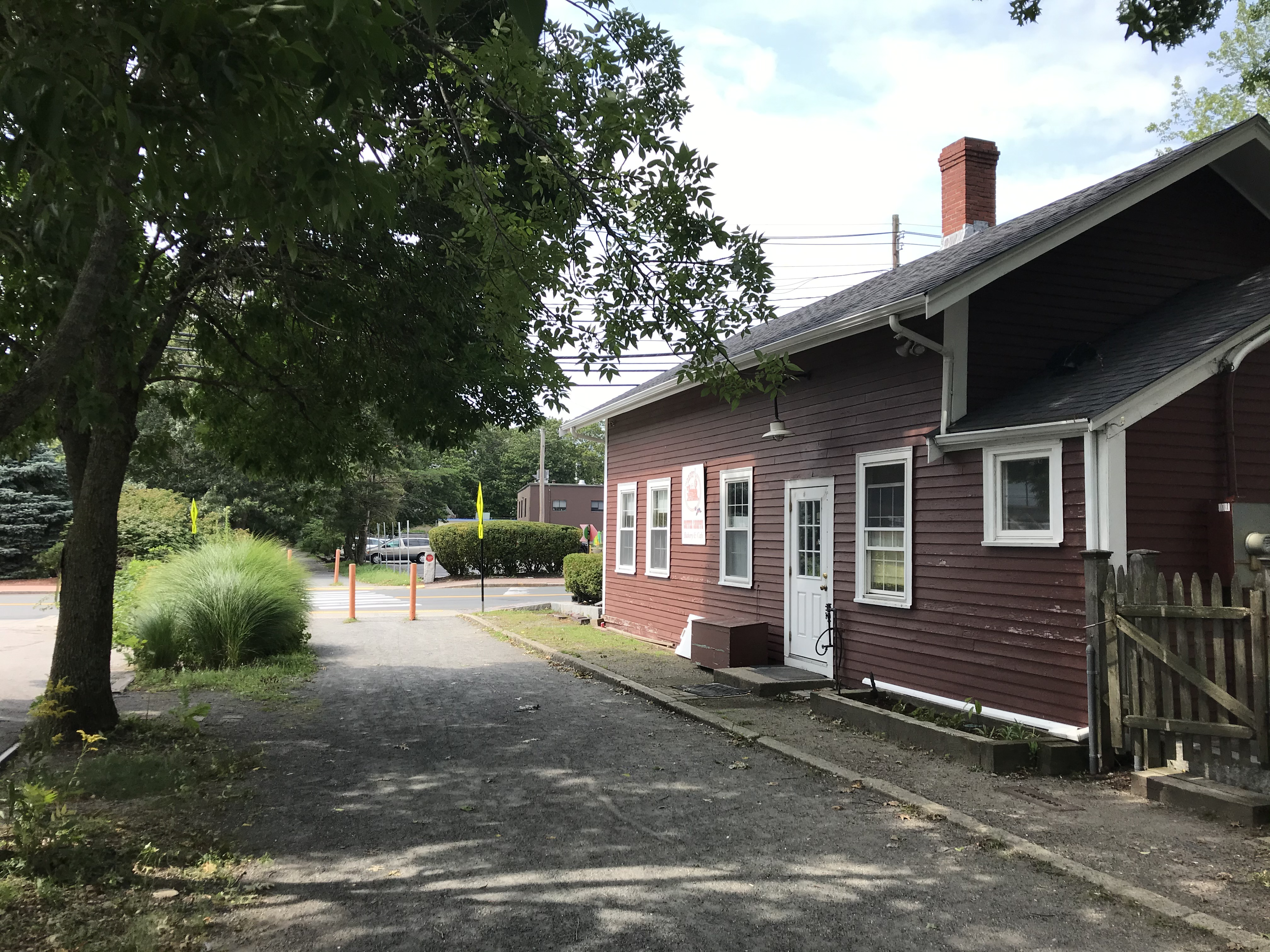
- The Newton Upper Falls Greenway passing by the former Newton Upper Falls Station.
- Length: 4 miles (6.4 km) open, 7 miles (11 km) when completed
- Location: Newton, Needham, Dover, Medfield
- Established: 2016
- Use: Walking, hiking, bicycling
- Surface: Compacted stone dust
- Right of way: MBTA
- Maintained by: Newton, Needham, Dover, Medfield
- Website: baycolonyrailtrail.org

The Bay Colony Rail Trail (BCRT) is a partially completed rail trail in Newton, Needham, Dover, and Medfield, Massachusetts. It has 4 miles (6.4 km) open and when completed it will be 7 miles (11 km). It is made up of 4 rail trails, the Newton Upper Falls Greenway, the Needham Rail Trail, the Dover Greenway, and the Medfield Rail Trail. Named for the former Bay Colony Railroad, the Massachusetts Bay Transportation Authority (MBTA) owns the right of way (ROW) and leases the trail to the municipalities. Most of the BCRT was once the Millis Branch, except the Upper Falls Greenway which was once the Charles River Branch Railroad that connected to the Highland Branch. The Bay Colony Rail Trail Association is a 501(c)(3) nonprofit dedicated to the dedicated to the development, maintenance and promotion of the BCRT.

== Upper Falls Greenway ==
The Newton Upper Falls Greenway is a 1 mile (1.6 km) compacted stone dust rail trail in Newton Upper Falls, connecting Newton Highlands to the Charles River. The ROW is owned by the MBTA with a long-term lease to the City of Newton. The trail was first proposed in 2011 by the former Friends of the Upper Falls Greenway led by resident Jerry Reilly, which organized volunteers to help build the trail. Work began to build the Greenway in 2013 by Iron Horse Preservation, a national non-profit that converts rails to trails financed by selling the scrap rail tracks and ties. However all progress had stalled by 2015, when the City of Newton picked up the work, and the trail was completed and dedicated in 2016. The trail is maintained by the city.

In 2023, planning began for the Newton/Needham Community Way, to extend the Greenway into Needham.

== Needham Rail Trail ==
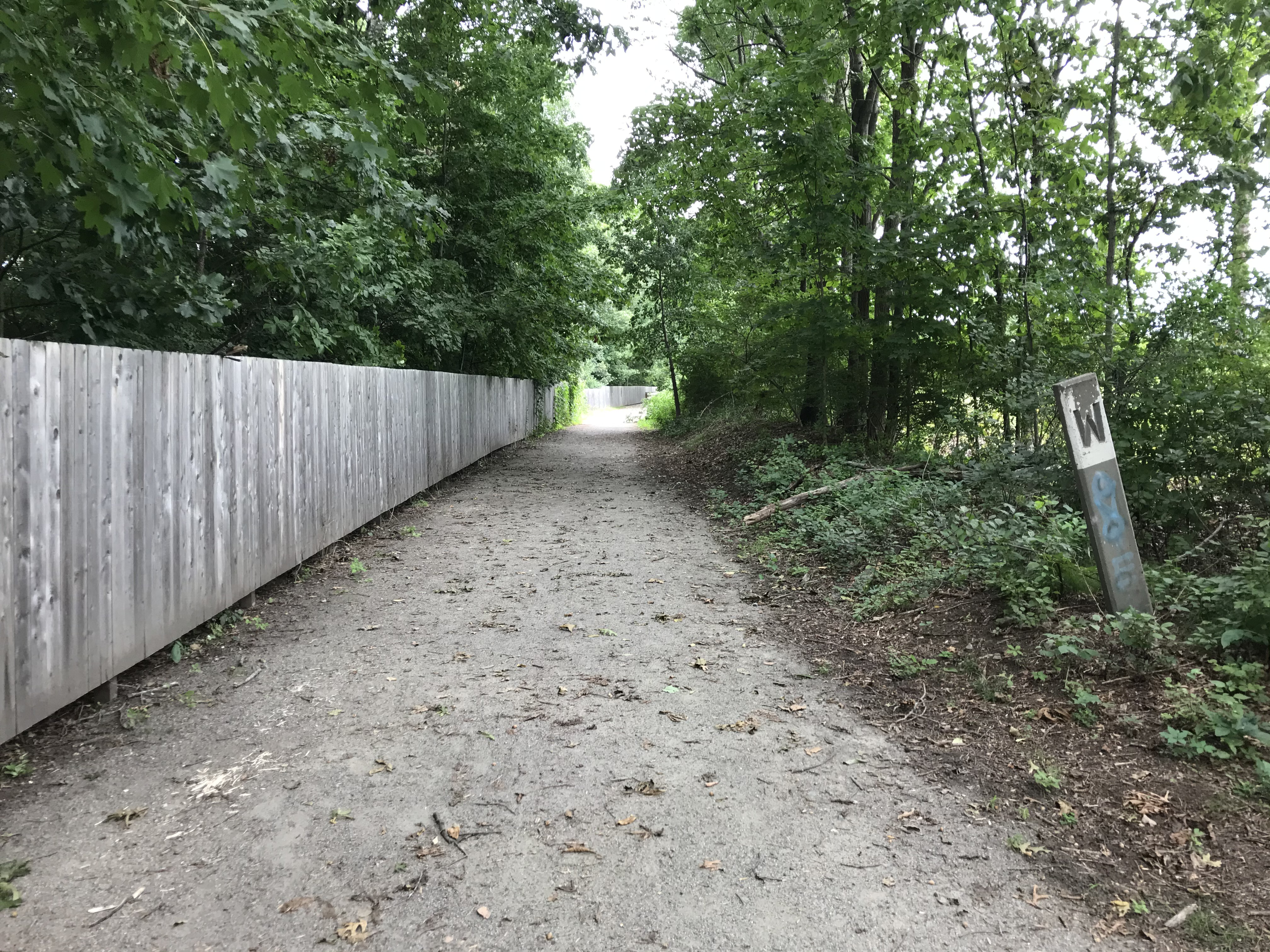
Needham Rail Trail and railroad whistle post

The Needham Rail Trail is a 1.7 miles (2.7 km) mile compacted stone dust rail trail in Needham, Massachusetts. The trail runs through Needham Town Forest, connecting Needham Junction station to the Charles River. A former 501(c)(3) nonprofit Friends of the Needham Greenway was formed in 2012 to help build the trail. Funded by a combination of State funds and private donations, construction began in 2015 and the trail opened in 2016. The ROW is owned by the MBTA and leased to the Town for 99 years at no cost. The trail is maintained by the Town.

== Dover Greenway ==
The Dover Greenway is a proposed 3 miles (4.8 km) compacted stone dust rail trail in Dover, Massachusetts. The MBTA right of way is parallel to Center Street, running from the Medfield Town line to the Charles River. In 2016, the Town voted in favor of signing a lease from the MBTA to build the trail, and in 2017 voted in favor of Dover-specific lease terms. However, by 2022, talks with the MBTA had stalled. The Friends of the Dover Greenway, a 501(c)(3) nonprofit advocating for the Greenway, suggested the Town sign a standard lease agreement, similar to what the MBTA had signed with Medfield and Needham. In June 2024, Dover was awarded a MassTrails grant for design of the trail. The Town announced the rail trail project in October 2024, anticipating design completion in fall 2025 with construction to follow. The trail will be maintained by the Town.

== Medfield Rail Trail ==
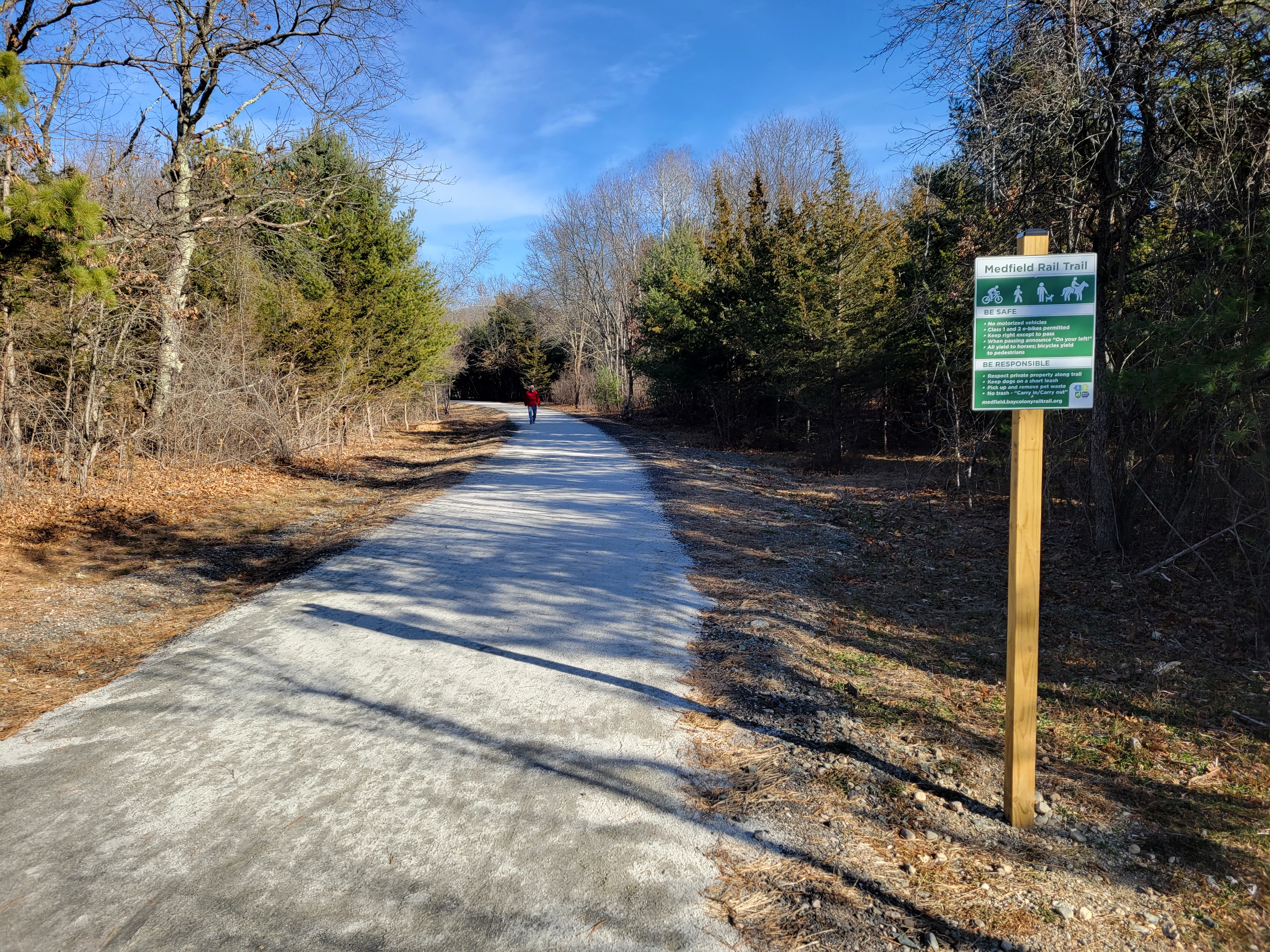
Medfield Rail Trail sign

The Medfield Rail Trail is a 1.3 miles (2.1 km) compacted stone dust rail trail in Medfield, Massachusetts. The trail runs from Ice House Road to the Dover Town line. A lease for the ROW was signed with the MBTA in 2021. The trail was funded by donations organized by the Friends of the Medfield Rail Trail, a 501(c)(3) nonprofit, and MassTrails State grants, and was completed in 2022. The trail is maintained by the Town.

== History ==
By 1958, the Highland Branch was abandoned, though freight service on the Upper Falls rail line of the Charles River Branch Railroad to Needham Junction and beyond continued until at least 1984. The MTA, the predecessor of the MBTA, acquired the Highland Branch ROW and built what would become the Green Line D Branch. The acquisition also included the Upper Falls ROW, but a proposal to extend the D Branch never occurred, eventually making the Upper Falls Greenway possible.

By 1967, commuter service on the MBTA's Millis Branch had ended. In 1998, the Boston Region Metropolitan Planning Organization completed a study which advised commuter rail reactivation between Needham Junction and Millis would not be cost effective. In 2008, the Bay Colony Railroad ceased operations on the section from Medfield to Newton, and formally abandoned its lease, reverting control back to the MBTA.
