= New Haven and Northampton Canal Greenway =

Rail trail between Connecticut and Massachusetts

- Length: 81.2 miles (130.7 km) proposed, 63 miles (101 km) miles completed
- Trailheads: Northampton, Massachusetts; New Haven, Connecticut
- Use: Walking, running, bicycling, roller blading, and cross country skiing
- Difficulty: Easy
- Season: year-round
- Surface: Paved surface
- Right of way: former New Haven and Northampton Railroad
- Website: The New Haven & Northampton Canal Greenway Alliance

The New Haven and Northampton Canal Greenway (NHNCG) is a partially completed, paved rail trail and non-motorized commuter route along the former right of way of the New Haven and Northampton Railroad. It is currently 63 miles (101 km) long, and if completed it will run for 81.2 miles (130.7 km) between Northampton, Massachusetts, and New Haven, Connecticut. The NHNCG name is an effort to unify and promote a regional trail name for the individual trails that it comprises. The New Haven & Northampton Canal Greenway Alliance (NHNCGA) represents seven nonprofit trail groups that advocate for the individual trails. As of 2025, 15 of the 16 municipalities through which the trail runs have officially supported the unified NHNCG name. The NHNCG is a part of the greater New England Rail-Trail Network.

The NHNCG consists of the following trails, from north to south:

- A section of the greater Northampton Rail Trail System between the western terminus of the Mass Central Rail Trail at Union Station and the Easthampton/Northampton border in Northampton, Massachusetts. All 3.5 miles (5.6 km) complete.
- The Manhan Rail Trail in Easthampton, Massachusetts. All 3.7 miles (6.0 km) complete.
- The Southampton Greenway in Southampton, Massachusetts. 0 miles (0 km) complete, 3.9 miles (6.3 km) proposed.
- The Columbia Greenway Rail Trail in Westfield, Massachusetts. 2.6 miles (4.2 km) complete, 7.4 miles (11.9 km) proposed.
- The Southwick Rail Trail in Southwick, Massachusetts. All 6.2 miles (10.0 km) complete.
- The Farmington Canal Heritage Trail between Suffield and New Haven, Connecticut. 45.8 miles (73.7 km) complete, 56.5 miles (90.9 km) proposed. The section between East Granby, Connecticut and New Haven, 45.3 miles (72.9 km) complete, 54.2 miles (87.2 km) proposed, is shared with the East Coast Greenway.

== Farmington Canal Heritage Trail ==
Farmington Canal Heritage Trail
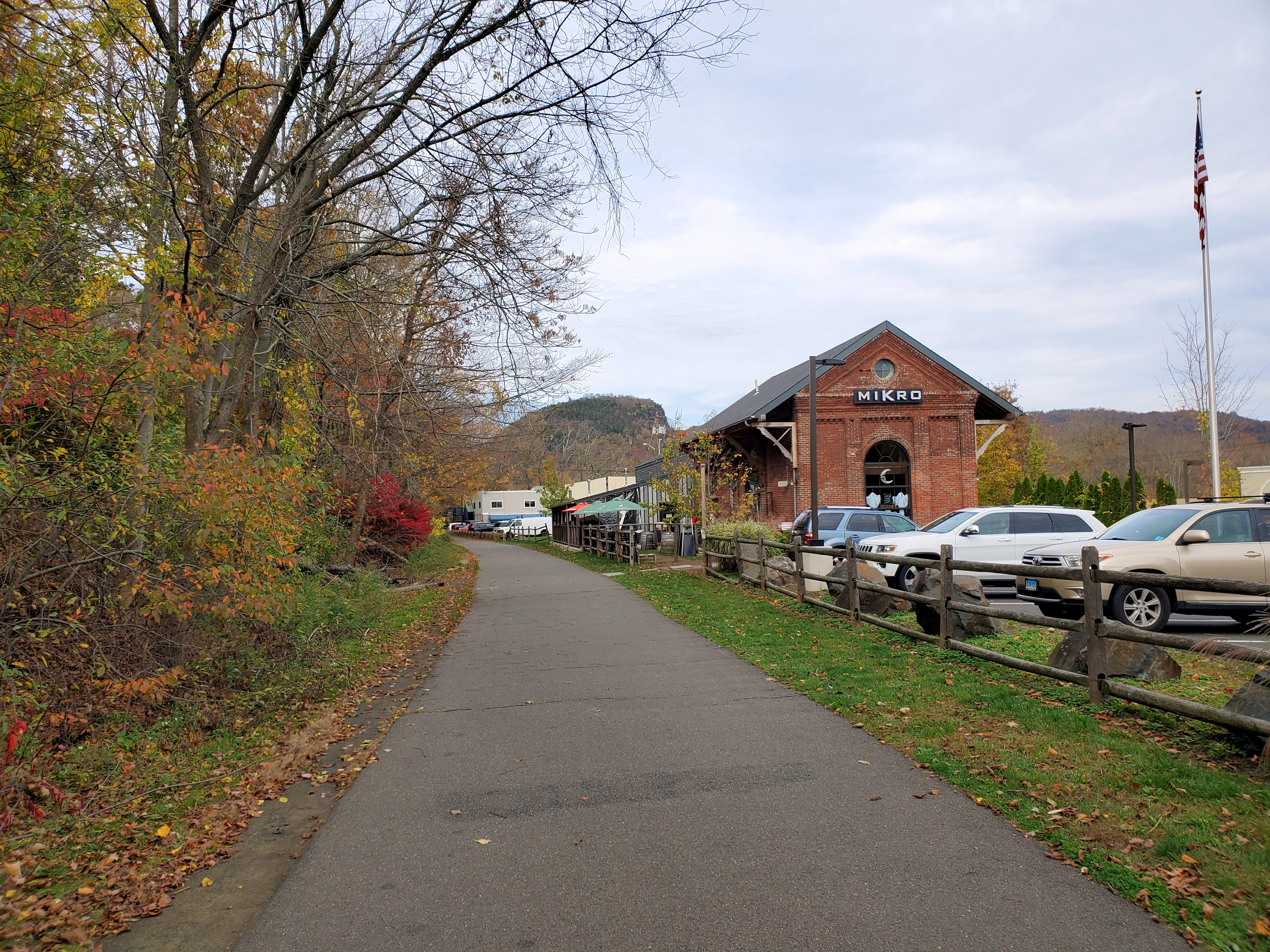
- Farmington Canal Trail in October 2020, with the MiKro Depot restaurant in the former Mount Carmel freight house at center right
- Length: Either 45.8 miles (73.7 km) open, 56.5 miles (90.9 km) planned when complete or 63.5 miles (102.2 km) open, 81.2 miles (130.7 km) planned when complete
- Location: New Haven, Connecticut to either Suffield, Connecticut or Northampton, Massachusetts
- Began construction: 1987 (Farmington Canal Rail-to-Trail Association formed), 1996 (first portion open)
- Use: Hiking, bicycling, inline skating, cross-country skiing
- Difficulty: Easy
- Season: Year-round
- Surface: Paved, stone dust
- Right of way: Former Farmington Canal and New Haven and Northampton Railroad
- Maintainer: Connecticut Department of Transportation, local municipalities
- Website: fchtrail.org

The Farmington Canal Heritage Trail (FCHT), is a 56.5-mile (90.9 km) multi-use rail trail in Connecticut. Some sources say it includes a 24.7-mile (39.8 km) portion in Massachusetts.

The FCHT was built on former New Haven and Northampton Company (NH&N) (later New York, New Haven and Hartford Railroad) railbed, which was constructed along the route of the Farmington Canal in Connecticut. In Massachusetts, trails exist along the Hampshire and Hampden Canal.

The sections from New Haven to Tariffville totaling 47.6 miles (76.6 km) are part of the East Coast Greenway, a 36 percent completed trail intended to link Maine with Florida.

=== Railroad history ===
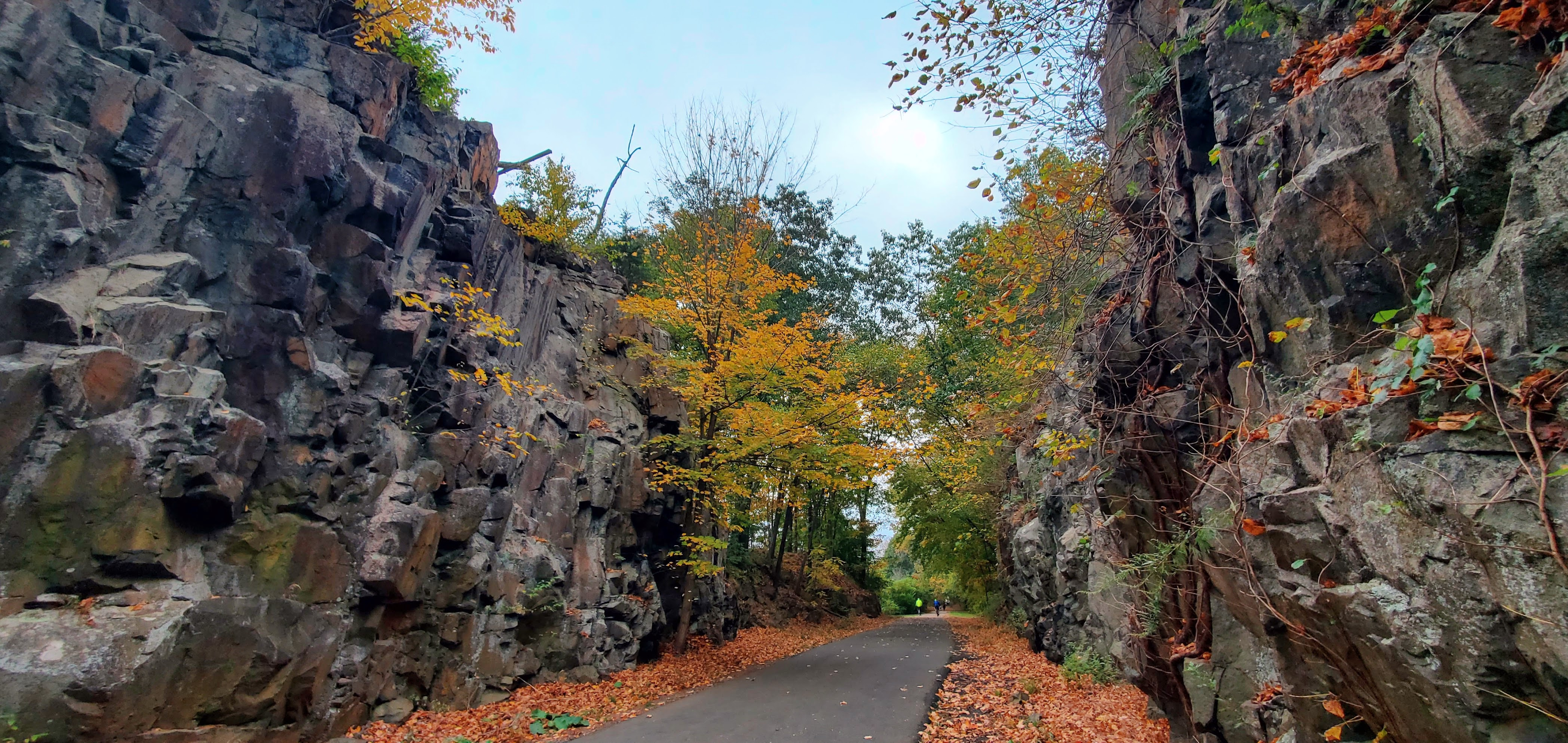
Cut through the Steps, Farmington Canal Heritage Trail, Mount Carmel, Hamden, CT

In 1821, a group of New Haven businessmen convened to construct a canal in Connecticut, much like the Erie Canal that was under construction in New York. It took ten years to complete and was open for use in 1835. Twelve years later, rail became more cost-efficient, and a rail bed was put down to follow the same route as the canal.

The line changed hands throughout its lifetime, from the NH&N, NH, Penn Central, Conrail, and finally Guilford, who abandoned the line in segments throughout the 1980s. The Connecticut Department of Transportation purchased most of the line from Guilford for railbanking purposes. In 1991, the Intermodal Surface Transportation Efficiency Act (ISTEA) provided states the ability to utilize federal funds to finance the conversion of derelict railroad corridors into rail trails.

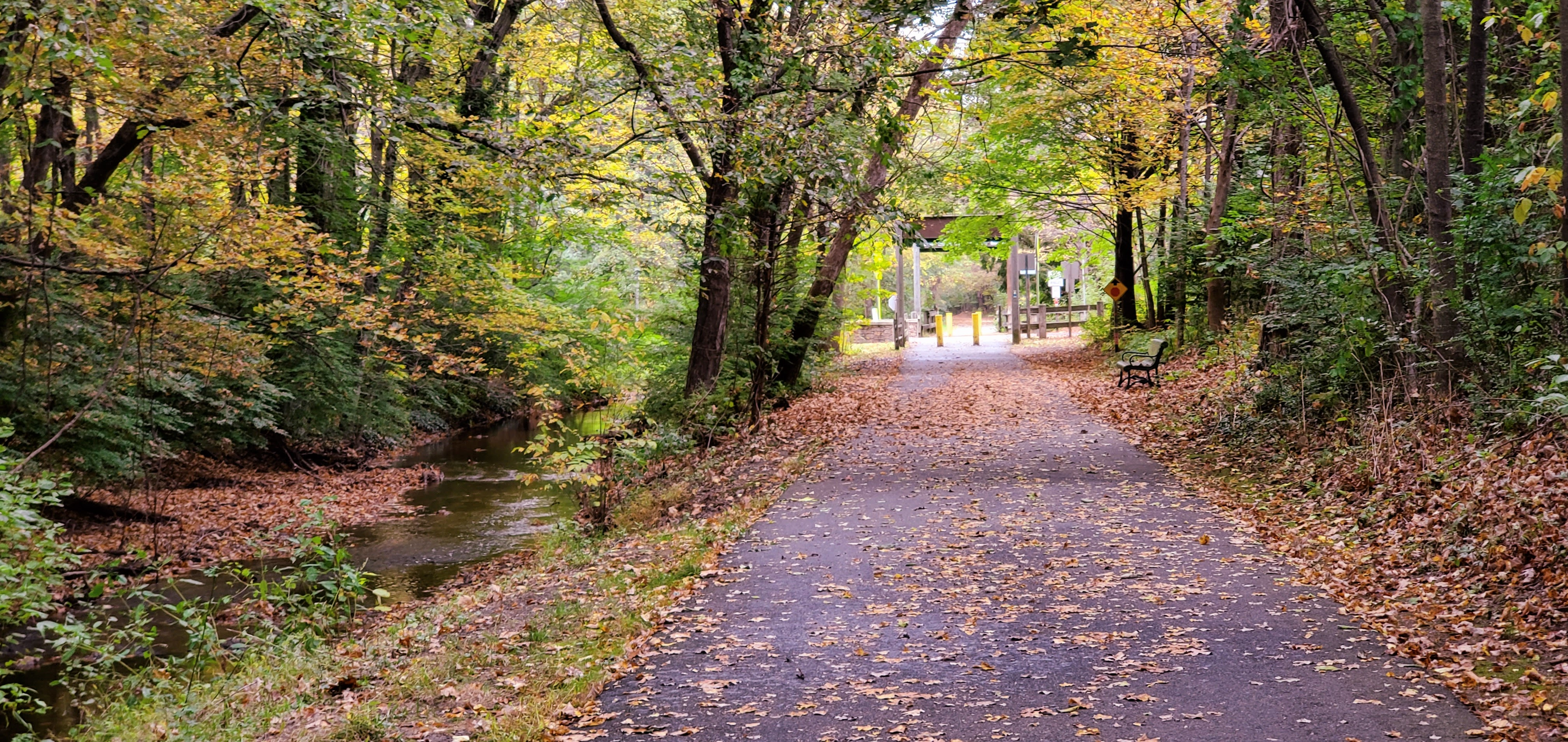
Farmington Canal Trail in Hamden in 2023

The FCHT runs from downtown New Haven, Connecticut, to either Suffield, Connecticut or Northampton, Massachusetts, closely following the path of the original Canal and Route 10.

Portions of the original canal still exist, such as an historic "lock house" dating from the time of the original canal, as well as retaining walls, canal locks (elevators for boats), old sections of canal, and other features. In Cheshire, Connecticut, the only restored lock along the original Canal line has been incorporated into the Lock 12 Historical Park.

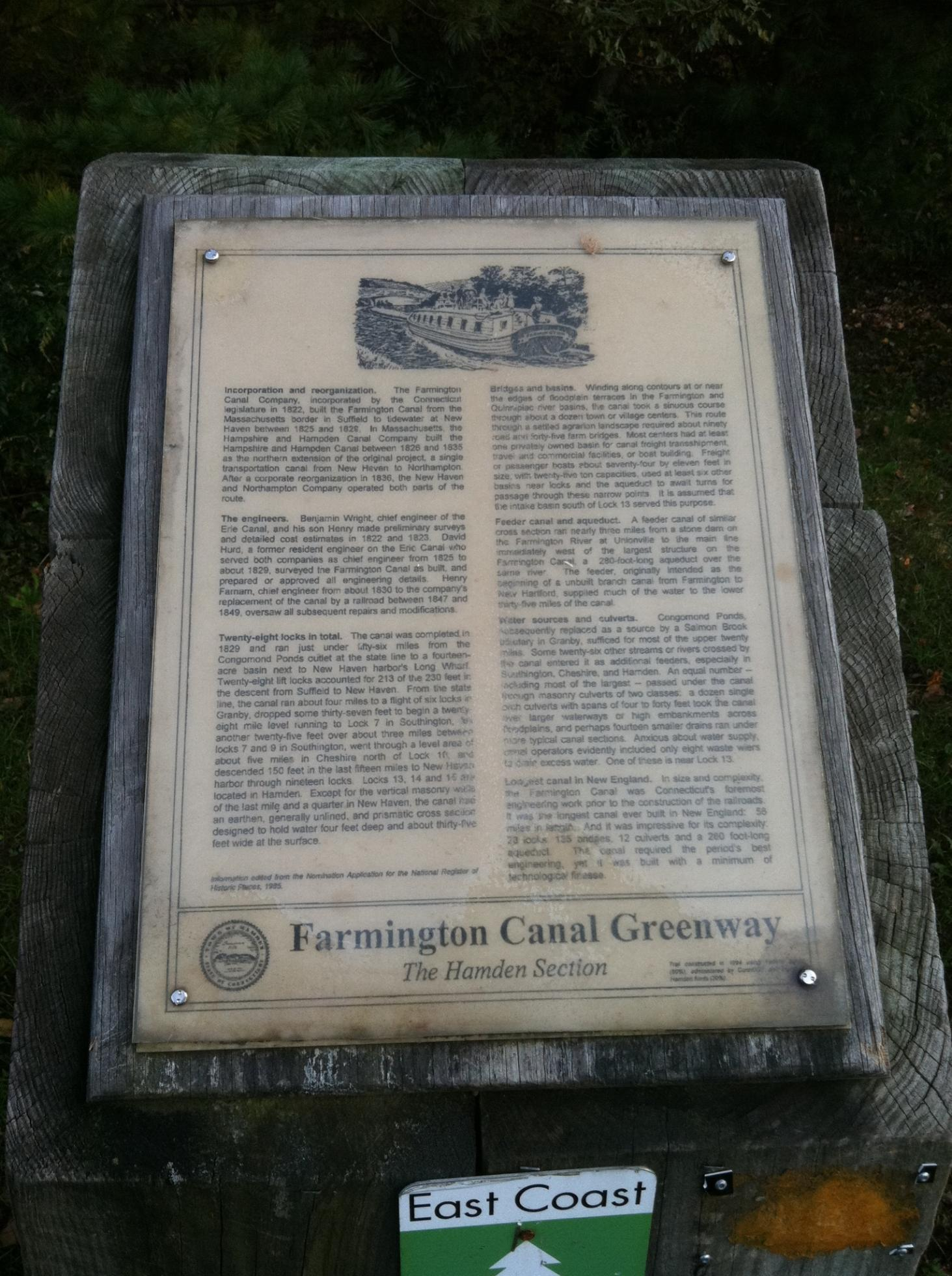
History on Trail

=== Trail status ===
The route of the Farmington Canal Heritage Trail is not yet completed (88% completed in Connecticut, 68% completed in Massachusetts if Massachusetts is included). The FCHT is divided into either two or three sections:

- Southern: New Haven-Cheshire, Connecticut
- Northern: Southington-Suffield, Connecticut
- Massachusetts (sources vary): Southwick, Massachusetts-Northampton, Massachusetts

==== Southern section ====
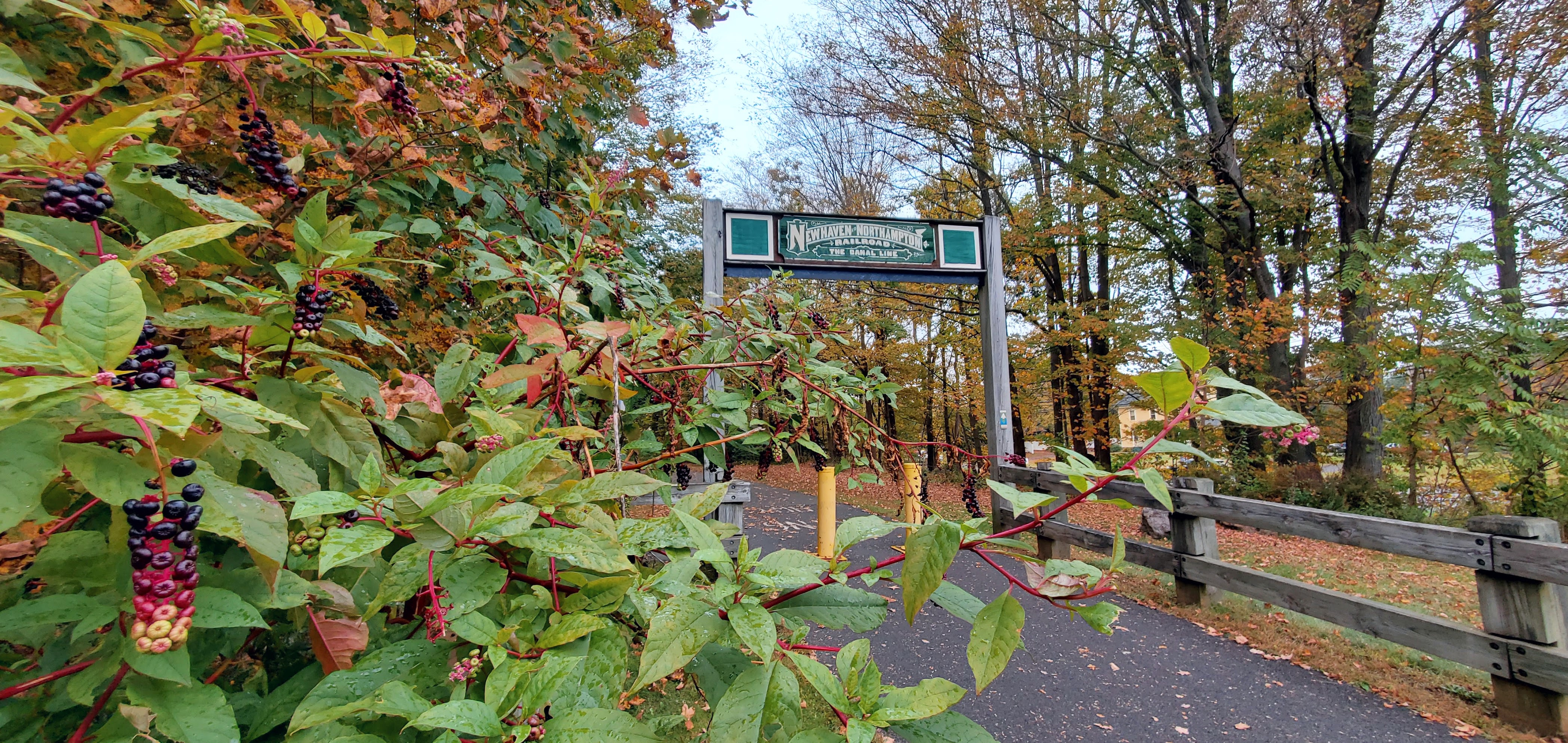
Farmington Canal Trail in Hamden in 2023

As of October 2018, one continuous section runs from Yale University to Aircraft Road in Southington, a distance of 26 miles. The last gap is the northern section of 5.3 miles through Plainville.

==== Northern section ====
As of October 2018, the FCHT extends uninterrupted from Northwest Drive in Northern Plainville to the Massachusetts border in Suffield (24.6 miles).

==== Massachusetts section ====
If Massachusetts is included, the FCHT would be the Southwick Rail Trail, the Columbia Greenway Rail Trail, the proposed Southampton Greenway, the Manhan Rail Trail, and the section of the greater Northampton Rail Trail System from the Easthampton/Northampton border to the junction with the Mass Central Rail Trail. As of October 2018, the Southwick rail trail in Massachusetts is complete, while the trail in Westfield is complete to the Westfield River Bridge, totaling 8.5 miles. There is a gap extending from north of the Westfield River through Southampton to Coleman Road (8.4 miles). The rest of the trail is complete through Easthampton into Northampton (7.3 miles). State funding for design of a 3.5-mile (5.6 km) Southampton Greenway from Coleman Road to the junction of Route 10 and Moosebrook Road was awarded in 2022.

==== Farmington Canal State Park Trail ====
Farmington Canal State Park Trail forms a portion of the Farmington Canal Heritage Trail in the towns of Cheshire and Hamden. The site of the greenway was originally used by the native Quinnipiac tribes as a path prior to its expansion as a road by the colonists. A canal construction project began on July 4, 1825, with the first sections opening in 1828. On June 22, 1836, the Farmington and Hampshire companies were in debt and transferred their ownership to New Haven-Northampton Company, resulting in a loss of more than $1 million in investor capital. In 1847, investors in the company petitioned the state for the right to build a railroad. The approved railroad was constructed in one year on the banks of the canal for a total cost of $186,000.33. Rail service lasted until the 1980s, when Guilford discontinued service. The Farmington Valley Trails Council was founded in 1992 to preserve the canal by converting it into a park. Part of the Farmington Canal State Park trail was dedicated May 22, 1994. Located on North Brooksvale road is Lock 12 Historical Park, a restored canal lock and museum dubbed the "best-preserved relic of Connecticut's canal era." The developed section within state park boundaries runs 17.7 miles (28.5 km) south from Hart Street in Southington to Todd Street in Hamden and includes the Farmington Canal's restored Lock 12, located south of Brooksvale Road in Cheshire.
