= Alexander Catlin Twining =

American scientist and inventor (1801-1884)

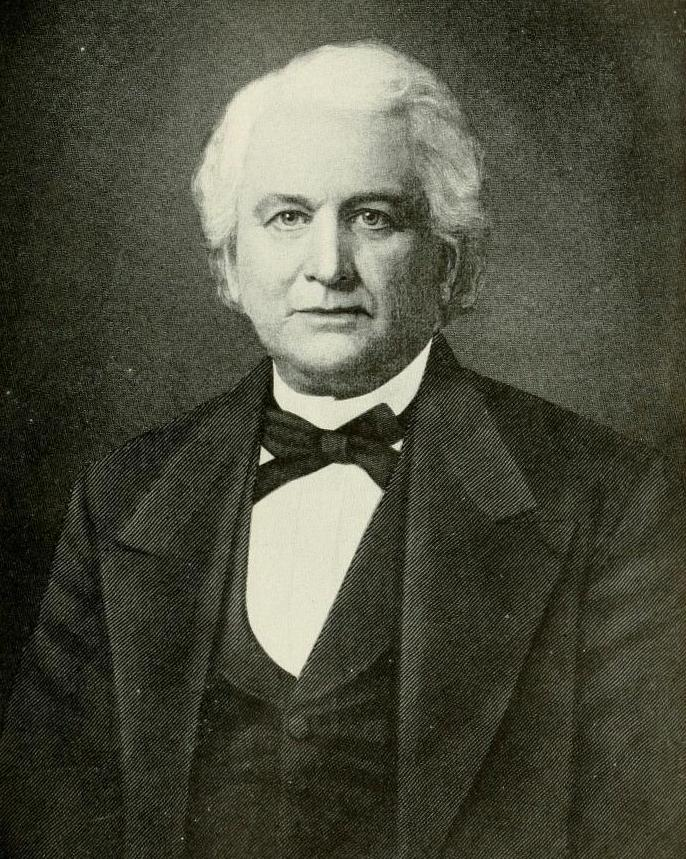
- Born: July 5, 1801; New Haven, Connecticut, U.S.
- Died: November 22, 1884 (aged 83); New Haven, Connecticut, U.S.
- Occupations: Scientist; inventor
- Parents: Stephen Twining (father); Almira Catlin Twining (mother)

Alexander Catlin Twining (July 5, 1801 – November 22, 1884) was an American scientist and inventor.

Twining, the son of Stephen Twining and Almira (Catlin) Twining, was born in New Haven, Connecticut, July 5, 1801. He graduated from Yale College in 1820. He left College with the intention of entering the ministry, and soon after studied for one year in Andover Theological Seminary. In 1823 he returned to New Haven as tutor in at Yale, in which office he served for two years.

Meanwhile he had decided to become a civil engineer, and now went to West Point to prepare himself for his profession. He was first employed upon the State works of Pennsylvania, and his earliest independent work was in 1835–37 as chief of the survey for the Hartford and New Haven Railroad; he was subsequently employed either as chief or consulting engineer upon every railroad running out of New Haven (excepting possibly the Derby road). In like manner he was employed on the northern lines running up the Connecticut River valley and through Vermont, on the Lake Shore road between Buffalo and Erie, and on other roads in Ohio, Illinois, and Michigan.

From 1839 to 1848 he filled the chair of Mathematics and Natural Philosophy in Middlebury College, Vt.; this position he resigned to give himself more fully to his engineering labors. He removed from Middlebury to New Haven in 1852, and resided there for the rest of his life. From 1856 until his death he was a deacon in the First Church, in which his father had filled the same office. For several years after his return to New Haven his labor was mainly given to the development of his invention for the artificial production of ice economically on a large scale. The principle of his invention was widely adopted, but he failed to secure pecuniary recompense for it. He made valuable original investigations in astronomy, mathematics, and physics, and was equally interested in questions of theology and political science, both in their theoretical and practical aspects In connection with the remarkable meteor shower of November 1833, he deserves the credit for first suggesting the correct theory of radiation of meteor tracks from a fixed point among the stars.

== Personal life ==
On March 2, 1829, Twining married Harriet Amelia Kinsley, of West Point, New York, who died October 12, 1871. Their children were three sons (graduates of Yale) and four daughters, including the Rev. Kingsley Twining; they survived their parents, with the exception of one son who died in the American Civil War.

Early in October 1884, he suffered congestion of the brain, and died at his home in New Haven on November 22, at the age of 83.

This article incorporates public domain material from the 1885 Yale Obituary Record.
