= Mount Carmel, Hamden =

Mount Carmel
- neighborhood
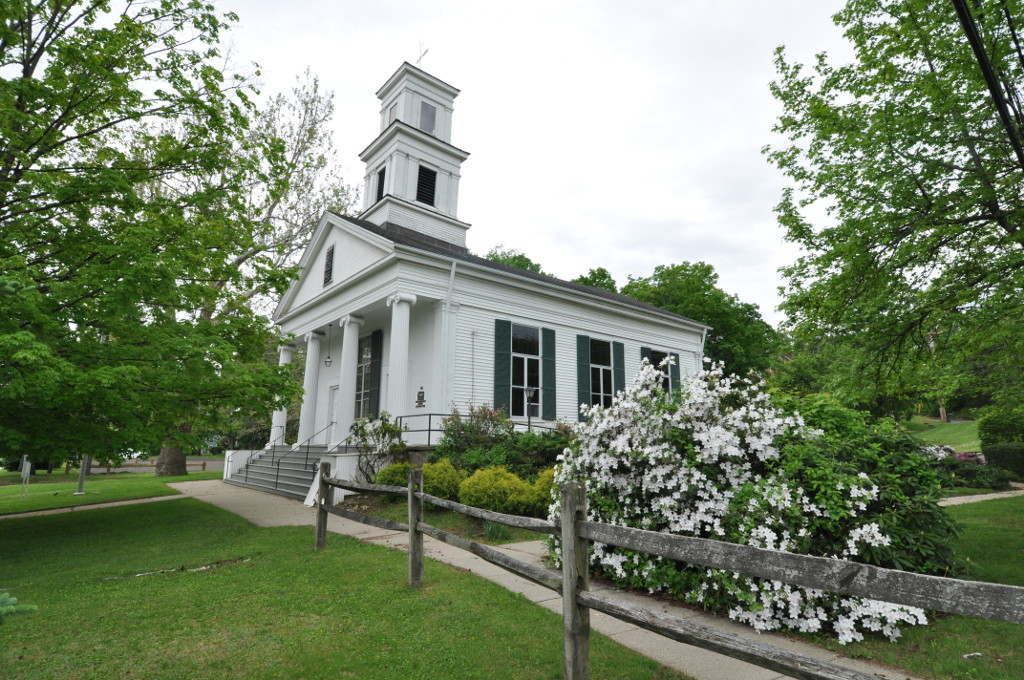
- Mount Carmel Congregational Church
- Interactive map of Mount Carmel
- Country: United States
- State: Connecticut
- County: New Haven
- Town: Hamden

Population
  - Total: 7,726

Mount Carmel is a neighborhood in the northeastern portion of the town of Hamden, Connecticut. It was the site of the first meeting house in what is now Hamden. Its founders named the area due to the resemblance of a range of hills nearby to the Mount Carmel mentioned in the Bible. The hills are better known today as the Sleeping Giant, site of a large state park known for its system of hiking trails. The neighborhood also contains the principal campus of Quinnipiac University. It is primarily residential with single-family homes. Commercial development is mostly along its principal street, Whitney Avenue.

As with all neighborhoods in Hamden, it has no officially defined boundaries. One map has it bounded on the north by the Cheshire and Wallingford town lines, on the east by the North Haven town line, on the south by James and Forest streets, and on the west by Farmington Canal Heritage Trail. The census tract with GEOID 09009166002, corresponding closely to these boundaries, had a population of 7,726, as of the 2010 census.

== History ==
A tavern and several mills were established in the area by 1743, which was then part of New Haven. This led to the founding of the Mount Carmel Ecclesiastical Society in 1757. There being no separation of church and state at the time, this was necessary before a town government could be established. A petition to establish a separate town was granted in 1786, with the name Hamden chosen for the English statesman John Hampden.

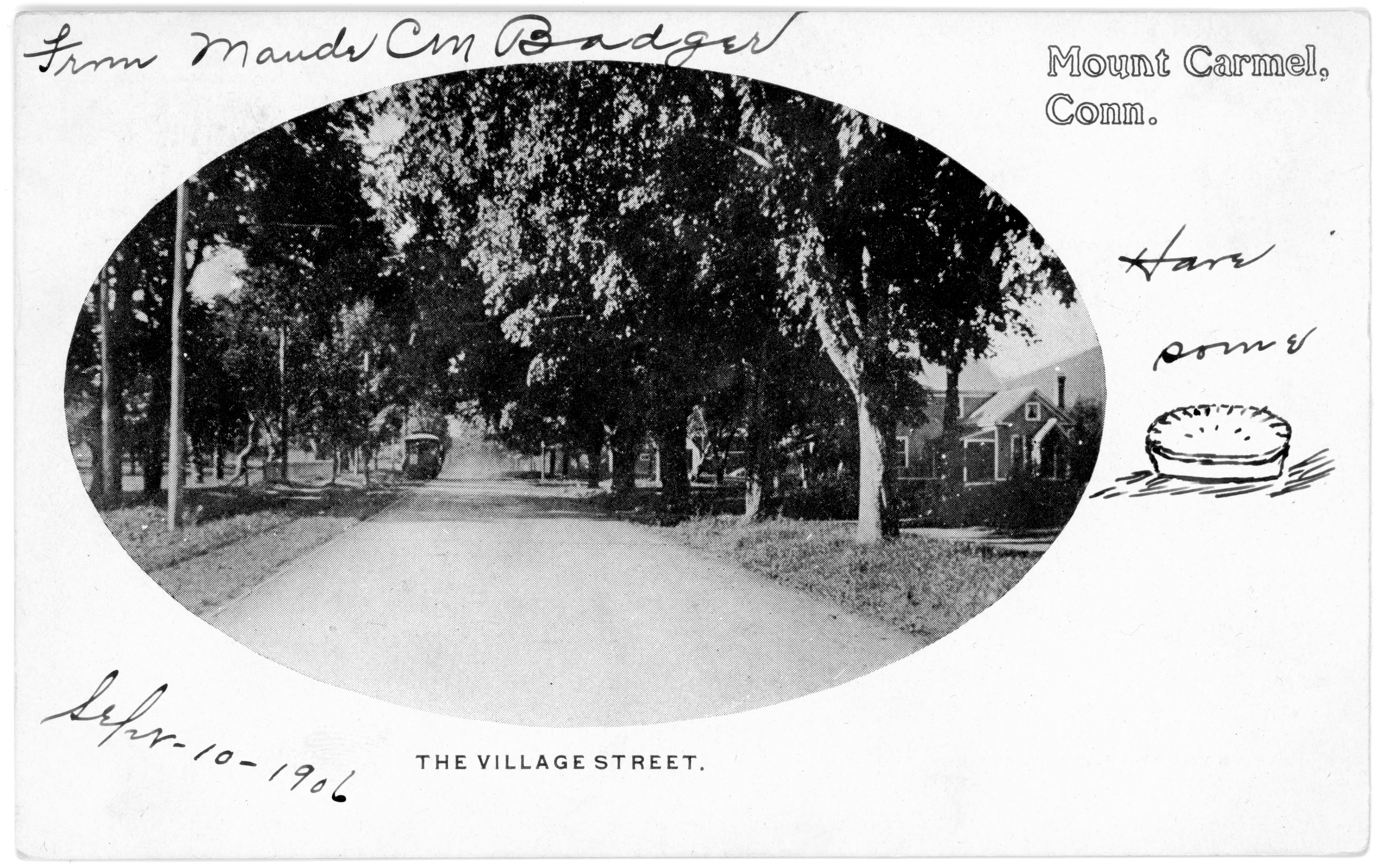
A postcard showing a trolley coming down a Mount Carmel street.

The Cheshire Turnpike (now Whitney Avenue) was built through the area in 1800, leveling the Steps, a rock formation near the head of the Sleeping Giant, and the Farmington Canal was completed in 1828. Improved transportation led to industrial development in an area called Ivesville (the present Ives Street).

In the 1850s, a new public school, a private school, and a post office were built, and the first Catholic parish in Hamden was established. Suburban development progressed after World War II, with Quinnipiac College (as the university was then known) moving its campus from the Whitneyville section of Hamden in 1966 and the extension of the Route 40 expressway in 1976.

== Historic sites ==
These sites are on the National Register of Historic Places:

- Jonathan Dickerman II House, serving as a museum for the Hamden Historical Society
- Sleeping Giant Tower, accessed by the principal trail in the park
- Farmington Canal (part)
- Elam Ives House
- Mount Carmel Congregational Church and Parish House

== Government ==
The Town of Hamden provides all municipal services for the neighborhood. It is located in Connecticut's 3rd congressional district, the 11th state senate district, and the 88th state house district. Most of it is in the 1st district of the town legislative council, with smaller portions in the 4th and 9th. It is served by the Centerville-Mt. Carmel post office with ZIP code 06518.

== Transportation ==
Whitney Avenue extends north and south through the neighborhood, connected by the Mount Carmel Connector (Route 40) to I-91, by Mount Carmel Avenue to North Haven, and Tuttle Avenue to Wallingford.

CT Transit bus route 229, running between the downtowns of New Haven and Waterbury, operates along Whitney Avenue.

== Recreation ==
Sleeping Giant State Park offers hiking, picnicking, fishing, and youth group camping. There are some 30 miles of trails on a variety of terrain. North of the park is the Sleeping Giant Golf Course, privately operated but open to the public.
