= Spring Glen =

Spring Glen is the name of several places in the United States of America.

- Spring Glen, Hamden, a neighborhood in the town of Hamden, Connecticut
- Spring Glen, New York, a hamlet
- Spring Glen, Pennsylvania, an unincorporated community
- Spring Glen, Utah, a census-designated place
- Spring Glen, Washington, an unincorporated community
