= Centerville, Hamden =

Centerville
- neighborhood
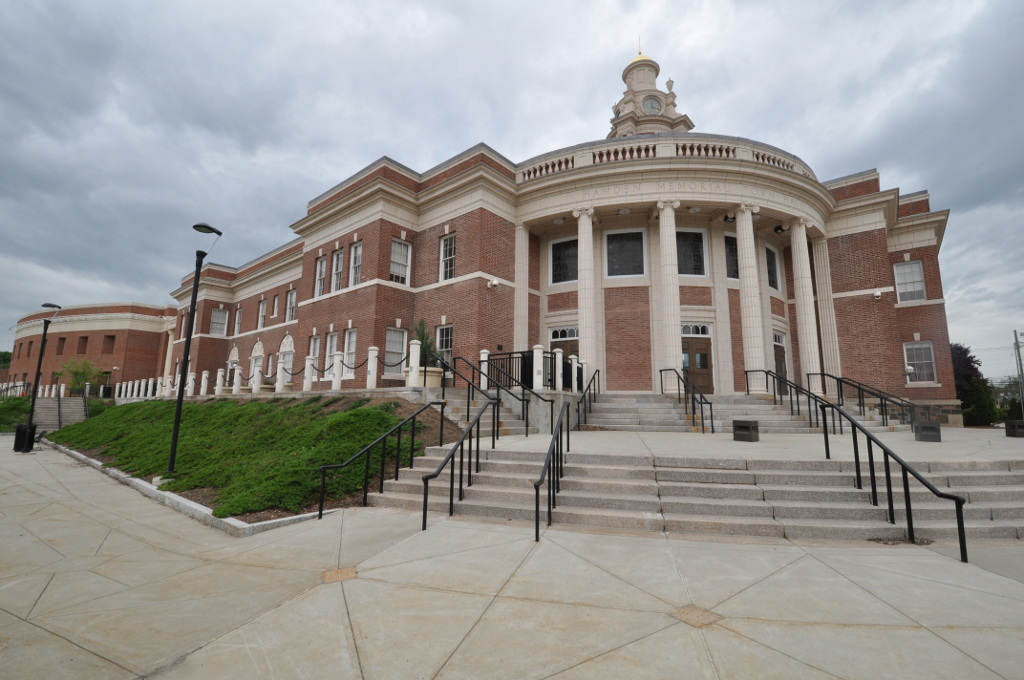
- Hamden Memorial Town Hall with Hamden Police Department at left
- Interactive map of Centerville
- Coordinates: 41°23′0.37″N 72°54′6.78″W
- Country: United States
- State: Connecticut
- County: New Haven
- Town: Hamden

Population
  - Total: 6,887

Centerville, originally spelled Centreville, is a neighborhood in the east-central portion of the town of Hamden, Connecticut. It is the location of Hamden Town Hall and other major town government buildings. It derived its name from being at the intersection of the town's two principal thoroughfares, Whitney and Dixwell avenues, both with commercial development. The rest of the neighborhood is residential, with single-family houses, condominiums, and apartments.

As with all neighborhoods in Hamden, it has no officially defined boundaries. One map has it bounded on the north by James and Forest streets, on the east by Mill River, mostly coinciding with the North Haven town line, on the south by Skiff Street, and on the west by Dixwell and Evergreen avenues. The census tract with GEOID 09009166001, corresponding approximately to these boundaries, had a population of 6,887, as of the 2010 census.

== History ==
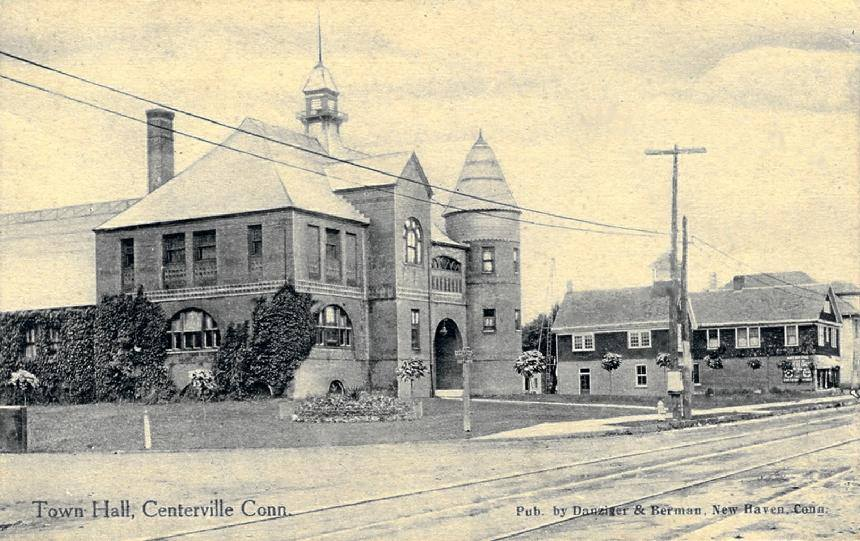
First Hamden Town Hall, built in 1888. Replaced by current Town Hall at the same site in 1924,

The area was first settled in the early 1700s, becoming part of the Mount Carmel parish in 1757. In 1821, Grace Episcopal Church, formerly in Mount Carmel, built a new church building in Centerville. A mill race was built near where the Mill River crossed the Cheshire Turnpike (now Whitney Avenue) in 1820, leading to industrial development and growth of the village in the following decades, including a factory making rubber shoes using Charles Goodyear's process. In 1835, a meeting at a tavern, known as the Centerville House, at the site of the present town hall, established it as the seat of town government. The first town hall building was erected at the site in 1888.

By the turn of the twentieth century, Whitney Avenue was paved from New Haven to Centerville, with a trolley line, leading to further development. American Mills Company bought the former rubber factory to produce straps for use during World War I. The Meadowbrook golf course was built on a former dairy farm and a new town hall was built on the same site as the old one in 1924. The American Mills factory was demolished to allow construction of the Wilbur Cross Parkway along the southeastern edge of the neighborhood in 1950.

In 2002, work began on converting the golf course into Town Center Park and Hamden Middle School. In 2012, the town hall was expanded to include police department headquarters.

=== Historic sites ===
These sites in the neighborhood are on the National Register of Historic Places:

- Hamden Memorial Town Hall
- Farmington Canal (small part)

== Government ==
The town hall is now occupied primarily by the Legislative Council chamber, the fire department headquarters, and the police department. Most other town government offices are in the Hamden Government Center, two blocks away.

Across Dixwell Avenue from the town hall is the Miller Memorial Library complex, which houses the main Hamden library, Thornton Wilder Hall auditorium, and the Miller Senior Center.

Centerville is located in Connecticut's 3rd congressional district, the 11th state senate district, and the 88th state house district. Most of it is in the 4th district of the town legislative council with a northwestern portion, known as Beecher Heights, in the 8th district. It is served by the Mount Carmel post office with ZIP code 06518.

== Transportation ==
Wilbur Cross Parkway has interchanges a short distance from the town hall east on Dixwell and south on Whitney. CT Transit operates the 228 and 229 bus routes on Whitney from downtown New Haven, 228 terminating at the town hall and 229 continuing to Waterbury. The 238 route operates on Dixwell from downtown New Haven to the town hall.

A short trail connects Town Center Park to the Farmington Canal Heritage Trail.

== Education ==
Hamden Middle School, serving the entire town, is in the neighborhood. Children in the neighborhood attend primary-level public schools, then Hamden High School, in other neighborhoods.

== Recreation ==
Town Center Park in the neighborhood is a major recreational area for the entire town. It is the site of concerts and other outdoors events throughout the warmer months. These activities typically take place on the green in many New England towns, but Hamden does not have one.
