= Highwood, Hamden =

Highwood
- neighborhood
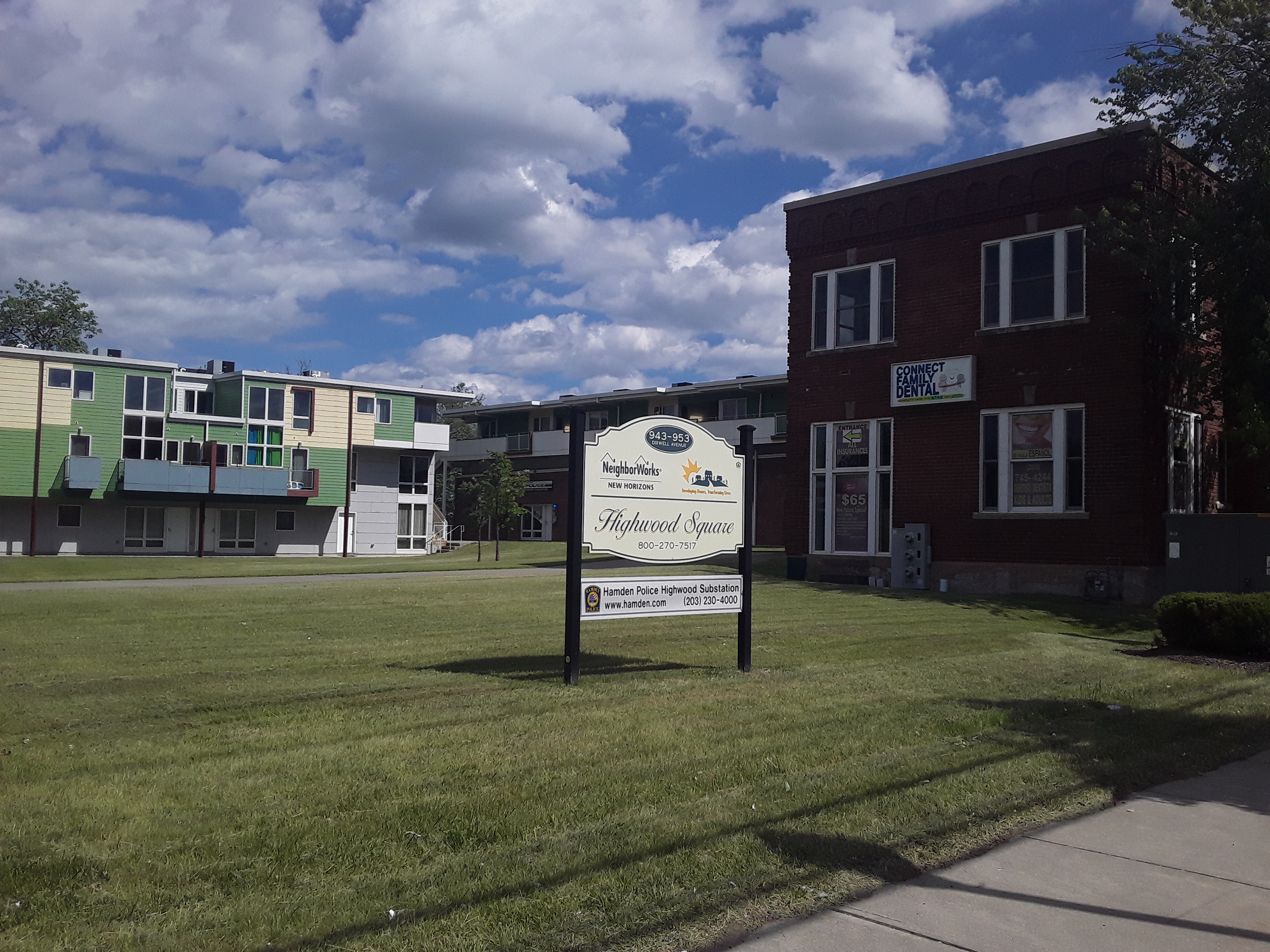
- Highwood Square mixed-use development
- Interactive map of Highwood
- Coordinates: 41.343°N 72.936°W
- Country: United States
- State: Connecticut
- County: New Haven
- Town: Hamden

Population
  - Total: 4,959

Highwood is a neighborhood in the south-central portion of the town of Hamden, Connecticut. It is primarily residential, with a mixture of small apartment buildings and single-family, two- and three-family homes. Commercial development is concentrated on its principal street, Dixwell Avenue. Immigrants from Germany were the first to settle the area extensively in the 1860s, followed by others from Ireland, Italy, and Eastern Europe later in the nineteenth century. Today it is predominantly African American.

There are no officially established boundaries for the neighborhood. One map has it bounded on the north by Helen Street and Putnam Avenue, on the east by Newhall Street, on the south by the New Haven city line, and on the west by Fitch Street and Fairview Avenue. The census tract with GEOID 09009165500, corresponding closely to these boundaries, had a population of 4,959, as of the 2010 census.

Several other names have been given to the neighborhood. The German immigrants named it Hamburg after the city in their homeland. It was given the Highwood name in 1888 by its first postmaster, Daniel Visel, while looking at tall trees through the window. It is also known as South Hamden, and its eastern portion has also been called Newhall; however, it should not be confused with the adjoining Newhallville neighborhood in New Haven.

== History ==
Enough German immigrants had settled in Hamburg by 1870 for a horsecar line to connect it to downtown New Haven and the town of Hamden to establish a public school there. By the 1880 census it had the largest population of five villages listed in town, 477. A post office with the Highwood name was established in 1888, and a volunteer fire department in 1896. Immigration from Ireland and Italy led to the first Catholic church in 1890, and a second in 1910. A railroad along the former route of the Farmington Canal led to establishment of a manufacturing area. An airport briefly operated north of Morse Street for a few years around 1930, then that area was used as a circus grounds. The area is now an industrial park.

On July 10, 1989, a tornado rated F4 on the Fujita scale caused extensive damage to Highwood. It was one of the most serious in a tornado outbreak across the northeastern United States.

Throughout the late nineteenth and early twentieth century, the Winchester Repeating Arms Company buried toxic waste in a portion of the neighborhood where homes were later built. In the largest residential cleanup program ever in Connecticut, thousands of tons of contaminated soil were removed from the area in 2010. The project was paid for by Olin Corporation, which had acquired the Winchester brand, and state bonding.

=== Historic site ===
The Farmington Canal-New Haven and Northampton Canal, running through the neighborhood, is on the National Register of Historic Places. Its route has been converted to the Farmington Canal Heritage Trail, which is a portion of the East Coast Greenway.

== Government ==
The Town of Hamden provides all municipal services for the neighborhood. It is located in Connecticut's 3rd congressional district. The neighborhood is in the 17th state senate district and the 94th state house district. The portion of Highwood west of the Farmington Canal Heritage Trail is in the 3rd district of the town legislative council with the remainder in the 5th. The western portion is served by the Hamden post office with ZIP code 06514 and the eastern by the Whitneyville post office, 06517.

== Transportation ==
Most of Dixwell Avenue in Highwood is part of Connecticut Route 10. The state highway, southbound, turns west off Dixwell onto Arch Street, then southwest onto Fitch Street into New Haven.

The principal bus route in the neighborhood is CT Transit route 238 along Dixwell Avenue. Routes 234 and 237 operate on several other neighborhood streets.

The Farmington Canal Heritage Trail has many access points in the neighborhood.

== Education ==
There are no public schools in the neighborhood. Students attend public elementary schools elsewhere in Hamden, followed by Hamden Middle School and Hamden High School. The former Newhall Street School is now the Borough496 business incubator. There is also the Eli Whitney Technical High School, part of a state system.

== Recreation ==
John L. Carusone Field, formerly known as St. Ann's Park, has a playground and fields for various sports. Keefe Community Center provides a variety of services.
