= Phil Weinberg =

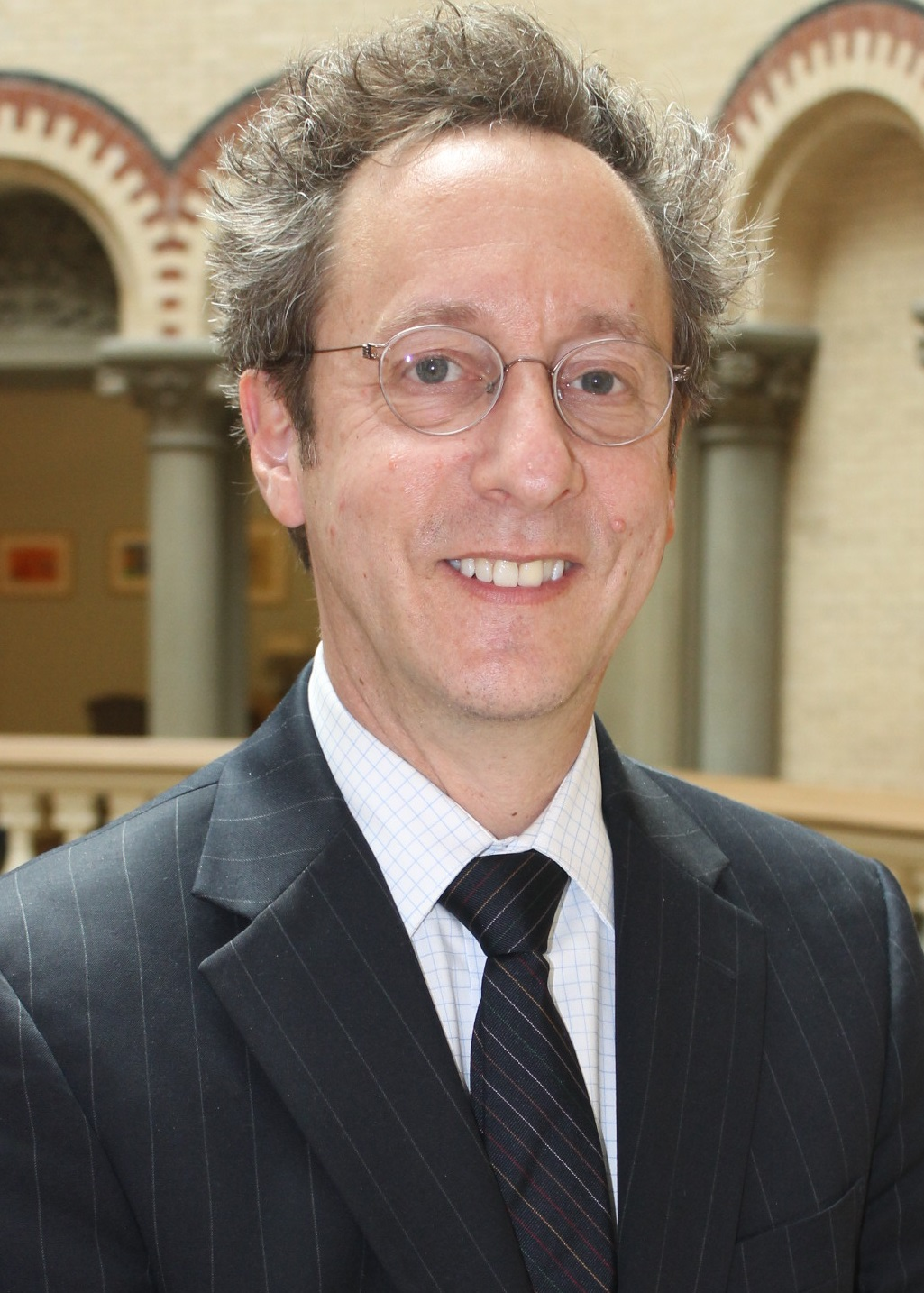

Personal details
- Born: May 3, 1960 (age 66) Hamden, Connecticut, United States

Phil Weinberg (born May 3, 1960) is the Deputy Chief Academic Officer for Teaching and Learning at the New York City Department of Education. In this role, Weinberg oversees initiatives to strengthen instruction and enhance student learning across the City's 1600+ district schools.

Weinberg has served as a New York City educator for nearly three decades. Prior to being appointed Deputy Chancellor in January 2014, he spent 27 years at the High School of Telecommunication Arts and Technology (HSTAT) in Brooklyn. At HSTAT, he was an English teacher, assistant principal, and most recently, the school's principal for 13 years.

== Early life and education ==
Weinberg was raised in Hamden, Connecticut, a town in New Haven County. He attended Hamden High School. Weinberg's passion for education was sparked by an independent study class he took as a high school senior. As part of the course, he received guidance and support to teach a small class of students with disabilities. This experience helped shape his belief that effective teaching requires ongoing reflection to assess student learning and professional collaboration to improve instruction.

Upon graduating from high school, Weinberg enrolled in Swarthmore College. He graduated in 1982 with a bachelor's degree in English. He received his master of arts in teaching English from Columbia University Teachers College in 1984, and later received his school building leader advanced certificate from Hunter College in Manhattan.

== Education career ==
Weinberg has been a New York City educator for 30 years. He spent 27 years at the High School of Telecommunication Arts and Technology (HSTAT) in Brooklyn. He served as an English teacher for 13 years and assistant principal for one year. In 2001, Weinberg became the school's principal and served in this role for 13 years.

HSTAT is a public high school located in Bay Ridge, Brooklyn. Since its inception in 1985, the school has employed the Educational Option high school admissions process to admit a bell curve of students with varied academic abilities. As a result, HSTAT serves 1,300 students with diverse needs. Twenty-four percent of students require special education services and a little over a quarter of students fall within the lowest third of all New York City students based on their eighth grade math and English Language Arts test scores. In addition, 80 percent of students qualify for free lunch based on family income.

Throughout Weinberg's principalship, he focused on preparing students academically and socio-emotionally for success in college and their future careers. In service of this vision, Weinberg funneled the school's resources, particularly the limited resource of time, towards improving students’ access to quality instruction. A principle strategy of this goal was to support teachers in implementing the Common Core Learning Standards. The Common Core is a set of national standards which outline the core skills students must master at each point in their academic careers to be on track for success in college. Weinberg supported teachers in rising to the challenge of implementing the standards by creating a culture of collaboration. Teachers agreed to work in teams and devote an extended amount of professional learning time each week to analyzing and discussing student work. This time was instrumental in allowing teachers to better understand students’ needs, determine how to shift instruction to support their growth, and refine assessments to better measure their progress towards mastering the Common Core.

Weinberg and his staff also used data-driven academic programming to ensure that all students, regardless of their academic abilities upon entering the school, would be on track to graduate and achieve a New York State Regents diploma. All students begin their career at HSTAT in rigorous introductory courses to develop strong foundational literacy, writing, and critical thinking skills. Students who enter the school in need of additional support are enrolled in sections of these courses which are taught in an inclusive co-teaching model. This model brings an additional teacher into the classroom to supports these students’ needs as they are exposed to the same curriculum and high standards as other students. Student progress is assessed continuously at the end of every course in order to enroll them in the most challenging course suitable for them. The ultimate goal was to create pathways that met students at their level and kept them on track for success in college-level coursework.

To support students in rising to challenging coursework, Weinberg also instituted structures called “initiatives” within the ninth and tenth grades. Initiatives are cohorts of up to 150 students supported by a team of teachers. This teacher team reviews student work, discusses where students are struggling, and strategizes about how to provide personalized and targeted support for their academic and socio-emotional needs. The cohorts also create a more intimate sense of community for students and a collaborative professional learning support structure for teachers.

As a result of Weinberg and his staff's efforts, HSTAT has seen significant gains in student achievement in the past several years. The school's four-year graduation rate rose from sixty-one percent in 2005 to eighty-six percent in 2012 (compared to the citywide average of 66 percent). Fifty-two percent of HSTAT students demonstrated college readiness by meeting the City University of New York's (CUNY) score requirements on New York State Regents examinations compared to the citywide average of twenty-eight percent. Students who reach this benchmark avoid remedial coursework should they enroll in a CUNY. Each year, HSTAT seniors celebrate their preparation for college by dressing up in professional clothing to turn in their college applications to their college counselors.

Weinberg was recognized for his leadership in many ways during his time as principal. He was selected for the Cahn Fellowship in 2006. The highly selective fellowship is a fifteen-month program from Columbia University Teachers College which recognizes outstanding principals and provides them with opportunities for professional, intellectual, and personal growth. In 2012, Weinberg received the Sloan Public Service Award from the Fund for the City of New York. The award is given to six civil servants each year whose outstanding work to serve the City goes above and beyond the call of duty and upholds the qualities of service, commitment, responsiveness, reliability, risk-taking, adaptability, and dedication to the public interest.

Schools Chancellor Carmen Fariña acknowledged Weinberg's effective leadership and instructional vision for schools when, in January 2014, she appointed him Deputy Chancellor for Teaching and Learning. In this role, Weinberg oversees all of the New York City Department of Education's work on curriculum, instruction, professional development, performance, and evaluation. He has overseen the launch of the Learning Partners program, an initiative to encourage inter-school collaboration by pairing host and partner schools to share best practices around focused learning areas. He is also guiding the work to develop a more nuanced system for school accountability, strengthen the teacher evaluation and development system to ensure teachers receive the support needed to grow as professionals, and expand and strengthen professional learning opportunities for educators.
