= List of charter schools in Connecticut =

The following is a list of charter schools in Connecticut grouped by county.

== Fairfield County ==
- Achievement First Bridgeport Academy
- The Bridge Academy
- Capital Preparatory Harbor School
- Great Oaks Charter School Bridgeport
- New Beginnings Family Academy
- Park City Prep Charter School
- Side by Side Charter School
- Stamford Charter School for Excellence

== Hartford County ==
- Achievement First Hartford Academy
- Jumoke Academy
- Odyssey Community School

== Litchfield County ==
- Explorations Charter School

== New Haven County ==
- Amistad Academy
- Booker T. Washington Academy
- Brass City Charter School
- Common Ground High School
- Elm City College Preparatory School
- Elm City Montessori Charter School
- Highville Charter School

== New London County ==
- Integrated Day Charter School
- Interdistrict School for Arts & Communication

== Windham County ==
- Path Academy School District
