= Spring Glen, Hamden =

Spring Glen
- neighborhood
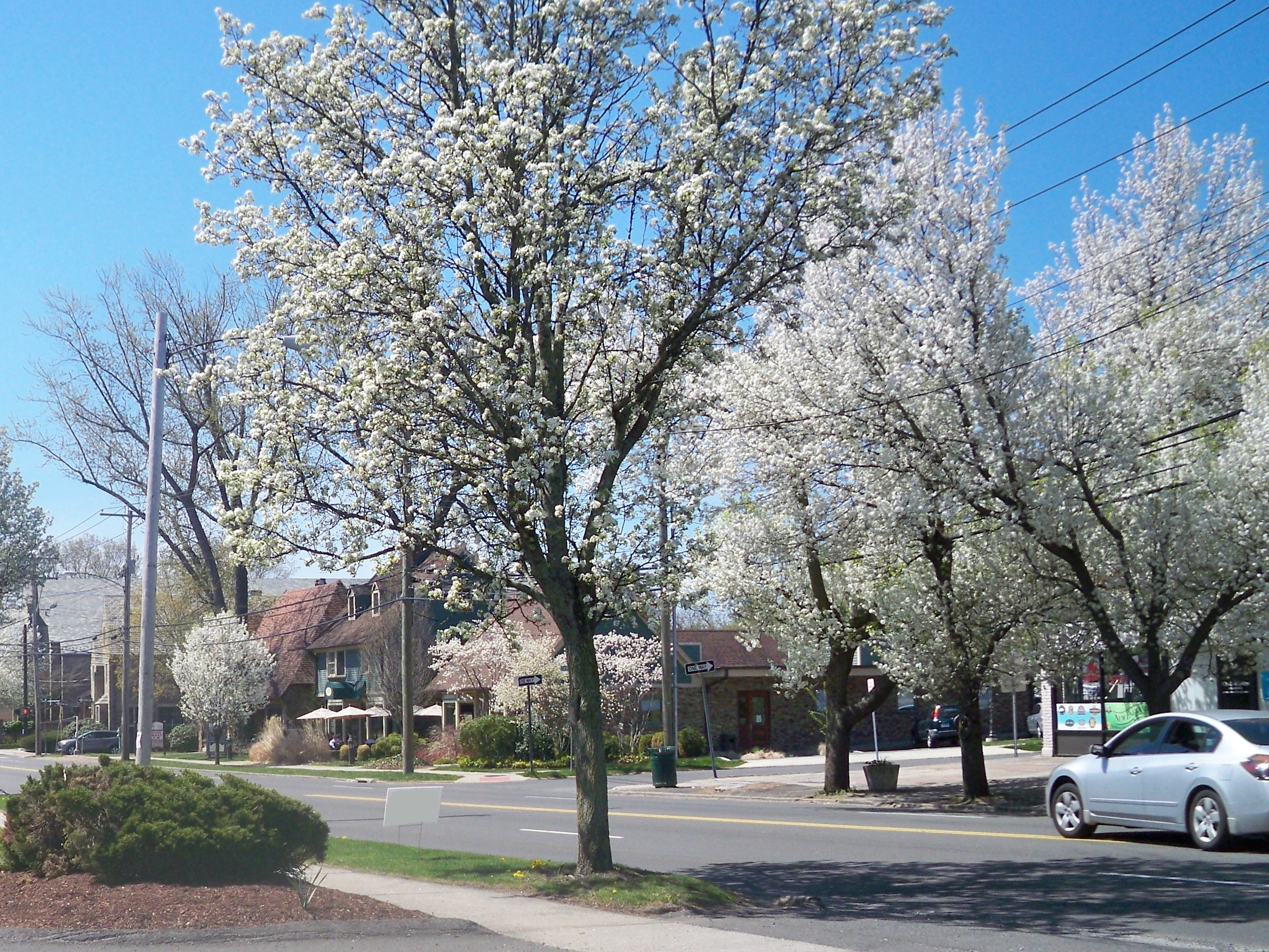
- Major commercial area of Spring Glen
- Interactive map of Spring Glen
- Coordinates: 41.362°N 72.906°W
- Country: United States
- State: Connecticut
- County: New Haven
- Town: Hamden and North Haven

Population
  - Total: 4,959

Spring Glen is a neighborhood in the southeastern portion of the town of Hamden, Connecticut. It is primarily residential, mostly single-family homes with a few two-family. Commercial development is entirely on its principal street, Whitney Avenue. It was developed throughout the first half of the twentieth century as a trolley suburb of New Haven. It was named for the Spring Glen dairy farm established by James J. Webb in 1858 in what would become part of the neighborhood.

There are no officially established boundaries for the neighborhood. The Spring Glen Civic Association has it bounded on the north by Skiff Street, on the east by Hartford Turnpike, on the south by Waite Street (including three small streets extending a bit south of Waite), and on the west by Lake Whitney and Mill River. This definition includes a small portion of the adjoining town of North Haven. The census tract with GEOID 09009165500, corresponding closely to the Hamden portion of the neighborhood, had a population of 4,959, as of the 2010 census.

== History ==
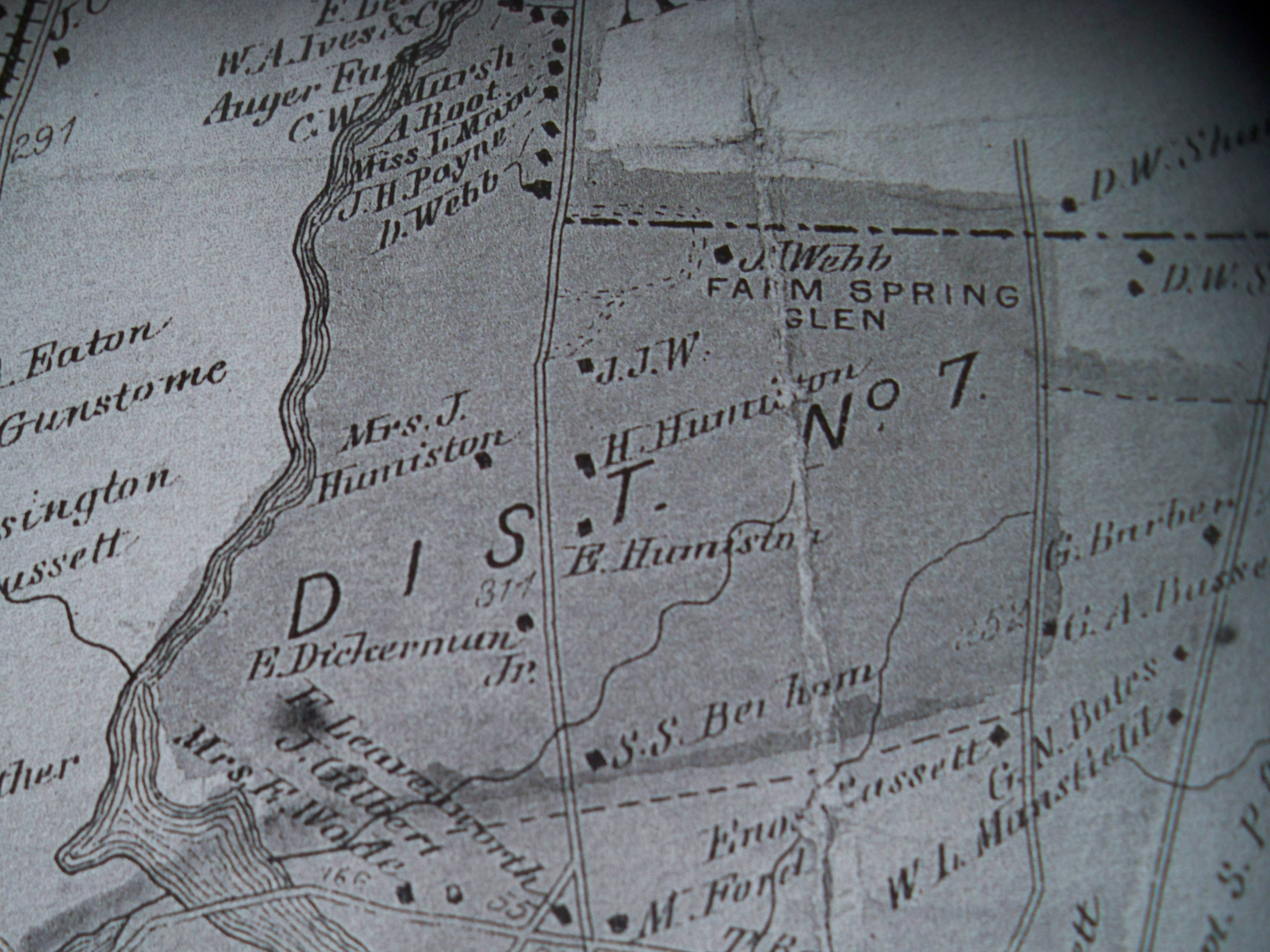
First known use of the Spring Glen name, for J.J. Webb's farm, on an 1868 map of Hamden.

A road on the ridge north of East Rock, now Ridge Road, was laid out in 1745 to access farms in the area now known as Spring Glen. The Cheshire Turnpike, now Whitney Avenue, was built in 1800, leading to farming of the land on the western side of the ridge. One of these farms was purchased in 1858 by James J. Webb, who had previously traded in Santa Fe, New Mexico. He tested improvements in dairy farming at the farm which he named Spring Glen. The trolley line from New Haven along Whitney Avenue was extended to Centerville in 1902, leading to the first subdivision of farmland in the area for houses. In 1924, the town of Hamden built the first Spring Glen School, leading to the subdivision of more farms including Webb's and commercial development on Whitney Avenue. Some distinctive houses in the neighborhood were designed by the architect Alice Washburn, who felt that since "society had placed women in charge of domestic affairs, they were uniquely qualified to design houses." Development of the neighborhood was complete by 1967.

=== Historic sites ===
Congregation Mishkan Israel on Ridge Road is on the National Register of Historic Places. The oldest Jewish congregation in Connecticut was founded in New Haven in 1840 and relocated to the present Modernist structure in 1960. The next year, Martin Luther King spoke at the synagogue.

== Government ==
The Town of Hamden provides all municipal services for the neighborhood, except the small portion which is part of North Haven. It is located in Connecticut's 3rd congressional district. The neighborhood is in the 11th state senate district. Most of it is in the 88th state house district with small portions in the 91st. The portion of Spring Glen west of Whitney Avenue is in the 4th district of the town legislative council with the east side in the 6th. It is served by the Whitneyville post office with ZIP code 06517.

== Transportation ==
CT Transit routes 228 and 229 operate on Whitney Avenue. Both begin at the New Haven Green with 228 terminating in the Centerville neighborhood and 229 in downtown Waterbury. Route 224 serves Ridge Road and Hartford Turnpike on weekdays only.

An interchange of the Wilbur Cross Parkway and an access to the Farmington Canal Heritage Trail are near the northwest corner of the neighborhood.

== Education ==
Public elementary school students in Spring Glen and some other parts of Hamden attend Spring Glen School. All Hamden students then attend by Hamden Middle School and Hamden High School. Also in the neighborhood are Saint Rita School, a Catholic school with pre-kindergarten to grade 8 and Lorraine D. Foster Day School for children with special needs.

== Religion ==
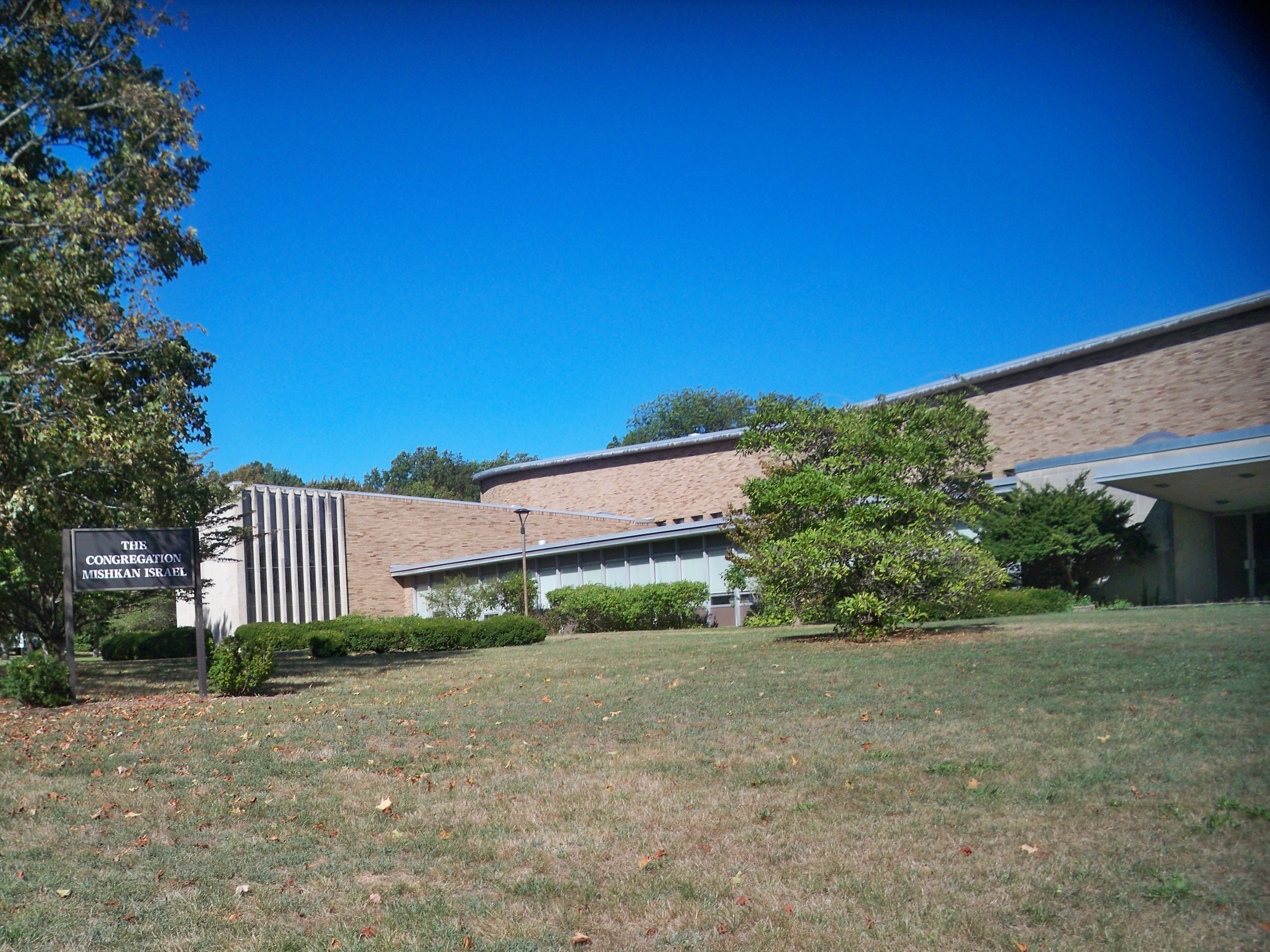
Congregation Mishkan Israel

In addition to Congregation Mishkan Israel, a Reform synagogue, Spring Glen has many houses of worship. St. Rita Church (Roman Catholic) was established in 1928, with its present building completed in 1964.

Spring Glen Church (United Church of Christ) was organized in 1929, first meeting in Webb's former milk house. Its present building was dedicated in 1958.

Other houses of worship include Temple Beth Sholom (Conservative Judaism), New Haven Korean Church (뉴헤이븐한인교회, Korean Presbyterian), and Unitarian Society of New Haven (Unitarian Universalist).

== Recreation ==
Bassett Park is a major town park with several baseball/softball fields, basketball and tennis courts, Larry's Playground, and, in adjacent areas, Hamden Dog Park and Moretti Field for soccer.
