= Lori Verderame =

American art historian

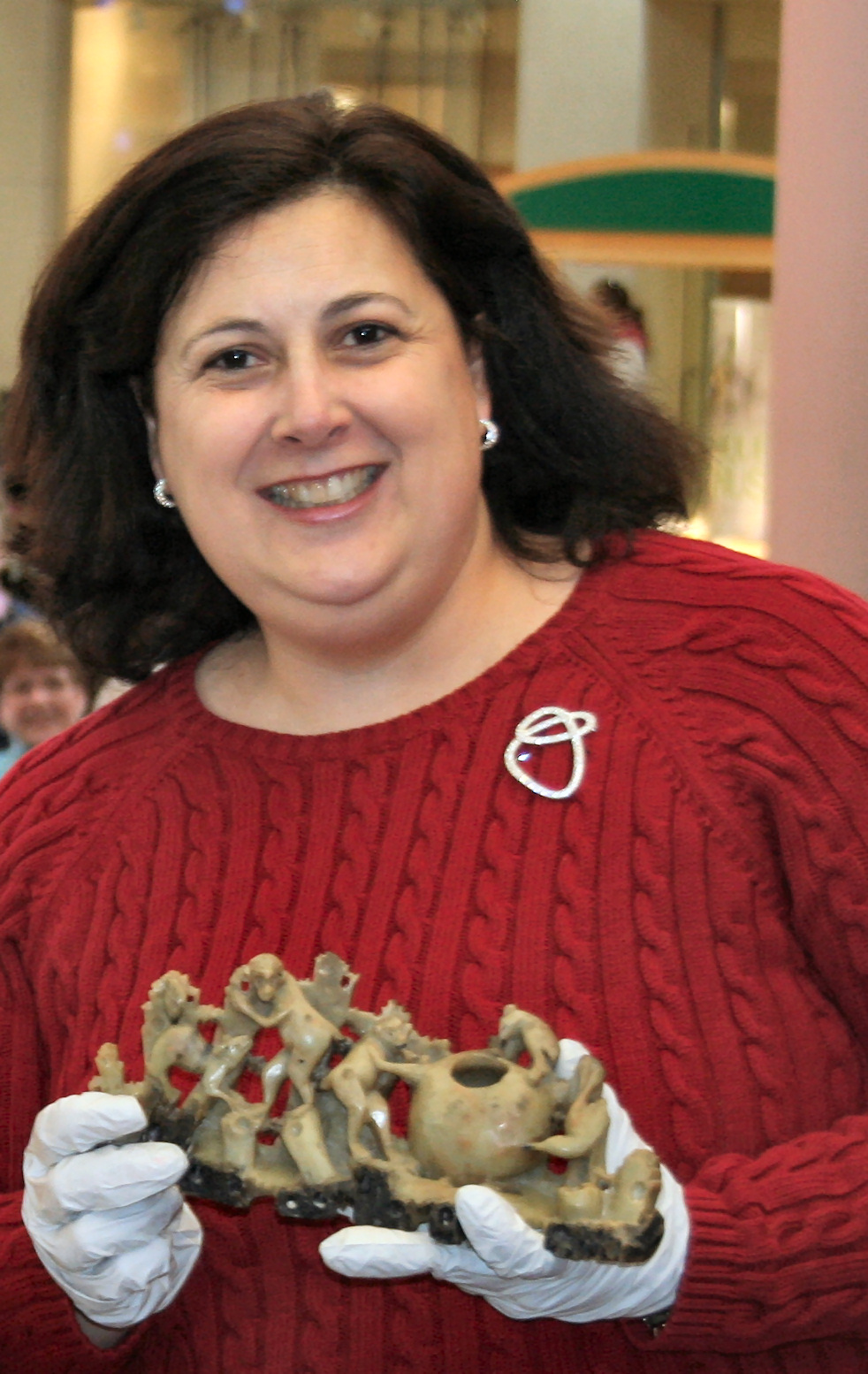
- Verderame in 2009
- Born: January 11, 1965 (age 61); New Haven, Connecticut
- Education: University of Michigan (B.A.); Wesleyan University (M.L.S.); Pennsylvania State University (Ph.D.)
- Occupations: Antiques appraiser, television personality
- Website: DrLoriV.com

Lori Ann Verderame /ˌvɜːrdəˈreɪm/ (born January 11, 1965), known professionally as Dr. Lori, is an American professional appraiser and television personality. She has been an author, professor, and museum curator. Verderame has been known as “America's appraiser" and "the Ph.D. antiques appraiser". She is known for her humorous and educational style of appraisal on her road show events.

Verderame has been featured on The Curse of Oak Island, Auction Kings, and Strange Inheritance (where she discovered, authenticated, and appraised George Washington's wallet), in several episodes of Pawn Stars do America, and made appearances on The Tonight Show with Jay Leno, The Daily Show with Jon Stewart, The Today Show, Anderson Live, CBS News, and Inside Edition. From 2008 to 2009 she hosted Comcast Tonight. She writes a syndicated column, "Arts & Antiques by Dr. Lori". Her road show events held nationwide are called Dr. Lori's Antiques Appraisal Comedy Show and she appears live on stage at 150 to 200 events every year since 1998. She maintains an informational YouTube channel. The channel content shows clips from her road show and television appearances, and she appraises over 20,000 objects a year.

== Early life ==
Lori Ann Verderame was born in New Haven, Connecticut on January 11, 1965.

Verderame attended Hamden High School in Hamden, Connecticut, graduating in 1983. Verderame graduated from University of Michigan at Ann Arbor, where she received a Bachelor of Arts degree in World History in 1987. She graduated from Wesleyan University, where she received a Master of Arts degree in Liberal Studies degree with a focus on Art History in 1989. From 1988 to 1992, she worked as a museum educator at the Yale University Art Gallery in New Haven, CT. In 1996, she graduated from Pennsylvania State University's College of Arts and Architecture with a Ph.D. doctorate in Art and Architectural History.

Verderame taught art and architectural history at Pennsylvania State University; she also taught at the State University of New York College at Cortland from 1993 to 1994. She worked as a curator at the Allentown Art Museum in Allentown, Pennsylvania.

== Touring and television ==
Lori Verderame presents "Dr. Lori's Antiques Appraisal Comedy Show" traveling around the United States and overseas appraising objects in an educational and entertaining manner. The show is presented live; audiences bring their objects for appraisal as part of the unscripted comedic appraisal stage show.

Verderame has been featured on The Tonight Show and The Daily Show with Jon Stewart. She has appeared on Anderson Live with Anderson Cooper, Daytime, The Balancing Act on Lifetime, Inside Edition, ABC, CBS, NBC, and FOX. From 2011 to 2013, Verderame was the art and antiques appraiser on Discovery's TV show Auction Kings. She appeared on episodes of FOX Business Network's Strange Inheritance. She is a cast member as the artifacts and antiquities expert on History's The Curse of Oak Island.

Verderame has produced and co-hosted (with Carol Erickson) the series Value This! with Dr. Lori. She hosts and co-produces the weekly series What's It Worth? with Dr. Lori with Steinman Communications and LNP Media Group and is a YouTube content creator. In 2019, she was a cast member and co-host on Treasure Hunt Tuesdays on the national daytime talk show The Doctor and the Diva on the DABL and YouToo America networks. She has appeared on the Bobby Bones Show, appraising objects for Bobby Bones and his cast.

Verderame appeared on History channel's series, Pawn Stars do America

Verderame appeared and appraised Ty Inc. Beanie Babies stuffed toys on the Netflix series, King of Collectibles: The Goldin Touch.

== Works ==
Verderame authored the following published books:

- Art History's Heroes: Masters of Contemporary Realism (Martin Art Gallery, Allentown, PA 2003)
- A Thin Line—a Broad Brush: The Art of Bruce Johnson (Susquehanna Art Museum, Harrisburg, PA, 2002)
- Seymour Lipton: An American Sculptor (Palmer Museum of Art, Pennsylvania State University, University Park, PA, 2000)
- Seymour Lipton: Post-War America in Three Dimensions (Martin Art Gallery, Allentown, PA, 2001)
- The Founder of Sculpture As Environment: Herbert Ferber (1906–1991) (Picker Art Gallery, Colgate University, Hamilton, NY, 1998)
- Muhlenberg Masterpieces: Selections from the Permanent Collection of Muhlenberg College (Martin Art Gallery, Allentown, PA, 1997)
