= Anthony Sagnella =

American football player (born 1964)

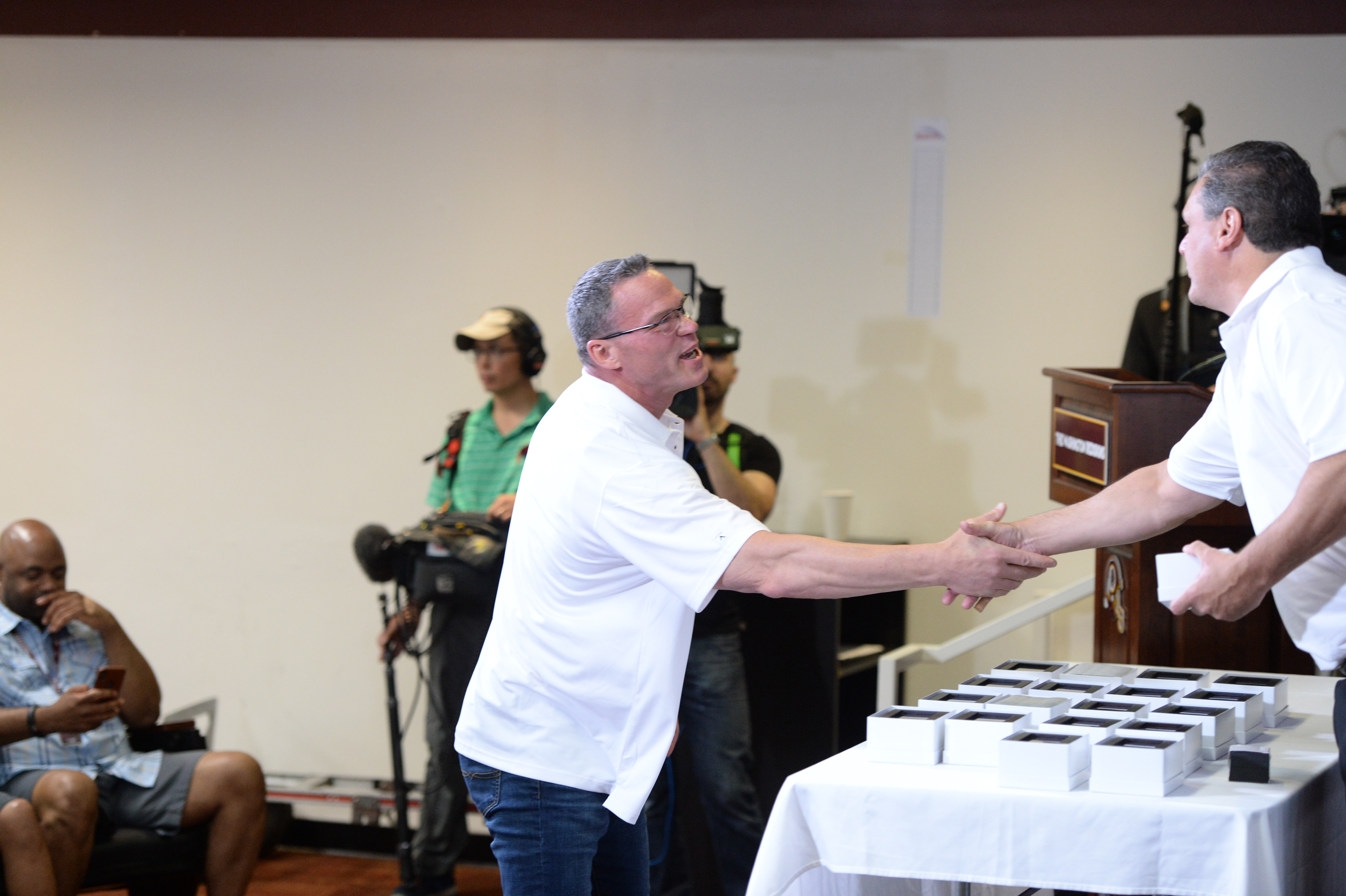
- Sagnella receiving his Super Bowl ring at a ceremony held in 2018

No. 94
- Position: Defensive tackle

Personal information
- Born: February 28, 1964 (age 62); New Haven, Connecticut, U.S.
- Listed height: 6 ft 5 in (1.96 m)
- Listed weight: 260 lb (118 kg)

Career information
- High school: Hamden
- College: Rutgers
- NFL draft: 1986: undrafted

Career history
- Washington Redskins (1986)*; New York Jets (1987)*; Washington Redskins (1987)
- * Offseason or practice squad member only

Career NFL statistics
- Sacks: 1
- Stats at Pro Football Reference

Anthony Sagnella (born February 28, 1964) is an American former professional football player who was a defensive tackle for the Washington Redskins of the National Football League (NFL) in 1987. He played college football for the Rutgers Scarlet Knights. He is currently a health teacher and football coach at North Haven High School.

Sagnella signed with the Redskins in 1986, but was waived during roster cutdowns. He returned to the team as one of the replacement players during the 1987 players' strike. In 2018, he and other replacement players were recognized for their contributions to the team by receiving Super Bowl rings.
