= Jonathan Dickerman II House =

Historic house in Connecticut, United States

- U.S. National Register of Historic Places
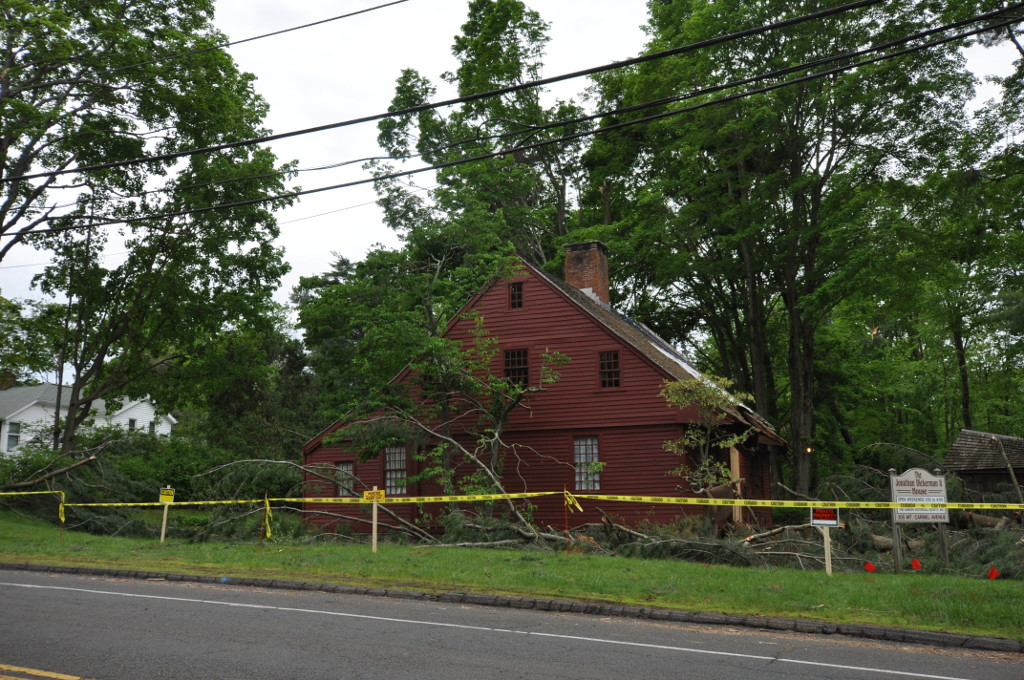
- House not long after 2018 storm damage

- Location within Connecticut Location within the United States
- Location: 105 Mount Carmel Avenue, Hamden, Connecticut
- Coordinates: 41°25′11″N 72°54′02″W
- Area: 1.5 acres (0.61 ha)
- Built: 1795
- Built by: Dickerman II, Jonathan
- NRHP reference No.: 82004351
- Added to NRHP: April 15, 1982

The Jonathan Dickerman II House is a historic house museum at 105 Mount Carmel Avenue in Hamden, Connecticut. Built about 1795 by the grandson of an early settler of the area, it is a well-preserved and unusual example of late Georgian architecture. It was listed on the National Register of Historic Places in 1982. It is now owned and operated by the Hamden Historical Society.

== Description and history ==
The Jonathan Dickerman II House is located in northern Hamden, oriented facing west on the south side of Mount Carmel Avenue just west of the Quinnipiac College campus. It is a 2 1/2-story wood-frame structure, with a gabled roof, central chimney, and clapboarded exterior. Unusual for a two-story house of this period, the front roof face extends to just above the first floor, and flares outward at the eave. The main facade is five bays wide, with windows arranged symmetrically around the center entrance. The entrance is also unusual for the period, with a double-leaf paneled door with glazed top panels. The interior follows a fairly typical center chimney plan, although it lacks the winding stair typically found in the entry vestibule. It retains many original period finishes, and has been fitted with displays of period furnishings.

Jonathan Dickerman I was one of the first people to settle in what is now Hamden, building on land purchased by his father Abraham in the 18th century's second quarter. His son built this house, most likely in 1795 after selling an older house it is sometimes confused with. It passed out of the family in 1835, and was used as a year-round residence until 1907. From 1924 to about 1961 it was used by the adjacent Sleeping Giant State Park as a seasonal staff residence. The historical society was given the house in 1961, with the understanding that it would be moved across the street as part of a road straightening project.

The house was heavily damaged by a tornado on May 15, 2018. Hamden Historical Society master carpenter Bob Zoni and his colleagues completed its restoration in July 2021, using period materials and building techniques.

== See also ==
- National Register of Historic Places listings in New Haven County, Connecticut
