= Auction Kings =

- Logo and cast of Auction Kings
- Genre: Reality
- Created by: Authentic Entertainment
- Starring: Paul Brown; Cindy Shook; Jon Hammond; Delfino Ramos
- Country of origin: United States
- Original language: English
- No. of seasons: 4
- No. of episodes: 89

Production
- Production locations: Sandy Springs, Georgia, Atlanta, Georgia.
- Camera setup: Multiple
- Running time: 20–24 minutes

Original release
- Network: Discovery Channel
- Release: October 26, 2010 – May 16, 2013

Auction Kings is a reality television series produced by Authentic Entertainment for the Discovery Channel. The series premiered on October 26, 2010, taking place in the Atlanta auction house Gallery 63 in Sandy Springs, Georgia, located on Roswell Road immediately north of the Atlanta city limit. The gallery has since relocated. The series capitalized on the success of the History Channel's widely successful Pawn Stars. The auction house employees often rely on experts to appraise items of which historical background is provided to the viewer. Sellers offer comments regarding the merchandise at hand both before and after the auction. At the second commercial break, a multiple-choice question about the auction house or the items is presented. The show ran its final episode on May 16, 2013.

== Cast ==
=== Gallery 63 Staff ===
- Paul Brown – Owner. Paul is a second-generation auction house owner. He initially had no desire to pursue it as a career but reconsidered after working at a car wash. Paul took a job with his father's Atlanta-based auction house in 1989. In 2005 he bought Gallery 63, just north of the Atlanta city limits.
- Cindy Shook – Manager. Cindy and Paul first worked together at his father's auction house in the early 1990s. She functions as both office manager and inventory manager, tagging and cataloging items for each sale.
- Jon Hammond – Assistant Manager/Picker. As a "picker" Jon not only helps process items at the Gallery but will often go in search of items to sell on consignment. A college English major, he bested nearly one hundred other applicants for the position of assistant manager.
- Delfino Ramos – Repairman. Often items brought to the auction house are in need of cleanup or repairs—both major and minor—to increase their sale value. Delfino has been with Gallery 63 since Paul Brown purchased the business.
- Jason Brooks and Guerry Wise – Auctioneers.

=== Recurring cast ===
- Bob Brown – Paul's father and owner of the Red Baron antique store/auction house (where Paul worked and learned the auction business in his youth). Bob was a semi-regular on the show in the first two seasons, and featured in the opening.
- Elijah Brown – Paul's son and Bob's grandson. Elijah works at Gallery 63 part-time as an assistant to Cindy and Jon, and attends high school. He is usually seen in the background holding items up for the bidders to see at the auctions, and also does some office work. He has been featured in a few episodes, learning the auction business from his father and grandfather.
- Steve and Ernie Garrett – A pair of antique pickers from Michigan, the Garrett brothers debuted on the show in season 3. They tour the country looking for items to buy, and then sell them at the auctions for profit.
- Dr. Lori – The Ph.D. antiques appraiser (Dr. Lori Verderame, the former museum director and university professor) who evaluates many different types of objects. Dr. Lori tells the Gallery 63 staff about the history of an object and what bidders should pay for the object at the auction. She appraises approximately 20,000 objects a year to audiences nationwide. Dr. Lori debuted on the show in Season 3.
- Greg from Greg's Vintage Guitars Atlanta has been on the show several times giving advice and appraisal information to the staff when they have received vintage and newer guitars and other stringed instruments to sell at the auctions. Greg has been a vintage guitar dealer with an online presence for over 12 years.

== Episodes ==
Season	Episodes	Originally released	
Season	Episodes	First released	Last released
1	20	October 26, 2010	February 1, 2011
2	25	August 9, 2011	November 22, 2011
3	26	April 25, 2012	September 13, 2012
4	18	February 21, 2013	May 16, 2013

No.	Title	Original release date
1	"Vampire Hunting Kit/Meteorite"	26 October 2010
Items featured include a softball-sized meteorite that struck Russia in 1947 and a vampire-killing kit from the 19th century; Jon finds a signed copy of Gone with the Wind and a genuine Nazi handbook from World War II.
2	"Love Meter/Knights of the Templar Sword"	26 October 2010
Jon finds a classic "Love Meter" arcade game in need of repairs. A monk brings in a 1647 Episcopalian prayer book that was brought to America during the Revolutionary War and used in the church attended by some of the Founding Fathers. A man brings in his grandfather's Knights of the Templar coat and sword.
3	"Ladies' Muff Pistols/John Hancock's Book"	2 November 2010
A collector brings in a pair of 19th-century ladies' pistols designed to be concealed in a hand muff, while another seller offers for auction an early-print Great Gatsby and a book signed by John Hancock. Jon picks a Venetian mirror.
4	"Rolling Stones' Snooker Table/Aliens"	2 November 2010
A seller brings in a snooker table he built for the Rolling Stones to use on tour. A woman sells a collection of rare African artifacts, including an elephant mask, two iron throne chairs, and a terracotta honey pot. Paul's dad Bob decides to sell a family of alien props that he took as trade for a pool table.
5	"Iwo Jima Sword/Cathouse Chairs"	9 November 2010
A 1969 Oldsmobile 442, two chairs reportedly from a New Orleans cathouse, and a WWII Japanese rifle and sword still partially wrapped in the 60-year-old paper used to mail them home from the battlefield.
6	"Dinosaur Tooth/Victorian Furniture"	9 November 2010
Cindy uses a drum set Jon brought in on a pick as a stress reliever. Paul takes Jon to meet a client auctioning off his collection of sentimental Victorian furniture, including a settee and a piano. A fossil-hunting couple from Montana bring in three rare dinosaur fossils, including a T.Rex tooth.
7	"Pink Cadillac/Baseball Memorabilia"	16 November 2010
Looking for funds to buy a new tour bus, a rockabilly musician brings in a pink 1960 Cadillac. A woman sells her husband's model tugboat, but it needs repairs. A collector brings in historic Negro league baseball memorabilia that he hopes will help pay for a mission trip to Côte d'Ivoire.
8	"Spy Watch/Model A"	16 November 2010
The Gallery 63 team prepare for their next auction, which includes a Model A Ford and Lion King concept sketches. Cindy brings in a weekend find: a 1950s spy watch/recorder that still has historic voices on it.
9	"Triumph Chopper/Ruby Necklace"	21 November 2010
A man walks in with a 92-carat ruby necklace he's been keeping in a shoebox, another brings in a classic 1967 Triumph Chopper, hoping for enough cash to help his mother renovate her house, and a third presents an unopened case of presidential brother Billy Carter's Billy Beer that the expert says is worthless, but that Jon bets will sell.
10	"Hand Cannon/Fabergé Pencil"	23 November 2010
A seller brings in an ancient hand cannon so old and so rare, even the experts struggle to determine its origin and history. A tiny jewel-encrusted gold pencil might just be Fabergé. Delfino struggles to revive a 90-year-old sour-sounding player piano. A woman brings in a painting her aunt left her, but gets a big surprise on auction day.
11	"Hot-Air Balloon/Woolly Mammoth Tusk"	30 November 2010
Cindy and Paul go up in a hot air balloon up for auction; also sold are a woolly mammoth tusk and a giant, unset sapphire.
12	"Headhunter Ax/Vintage Coke Machine"	7 December 2010
A headhunter's ax and a rare Vespa scooter with a sidecar are put up for auction; meanwhile, Paul and Cindy have a bidding war over a vintage Coca-Cola machine.
13	"Samurai Sword/Steamer Trunk"	14 December 2010
14	"Johnny Cash Guitar/Speed Rug"	21 December 2010
The auction includes a guitar autographed by Johnny Cash, a trading knife made from a jawbone, and a 17th-century chest for treasures. Paul and Cindy initiate Jon in the Speed Rug sale.
15	"Hot-Lindenbergh Scrapbook/Antique Toys"	28 December 2010
With a historic Charles Lindbergh scrapbook and a collection of antique metal toys already on the block, Paul also takes a gamble on a rare Wurlitzer band organ.
16	"Napoleon Mirror/WWI Boy Scout Poster"	4 January 2011
Before auctioning off a hand mirror signed by Napoleon and a World War I Boy Scout war bonds poster, Paul calls in his antique-expert sister to appraise a mysterious cabinet, and Jon wants to impress his boss by helping assemble the upcoming auction's catalog.
17	"Shrunken Head/MLK Letter"	11 January 2011
A letter signed by Rev. Martin Luther King Jr. and doll furniture created by famous folk artist Howard Finster go on the block; a woman brings in what she believes to be a shrunken head; and Paul enlists his mentor and father, Bob Brown, to help entice Paul's son Elijah to go into the family auction-house business.
18	"Happy Days Pinball/Wall of Shame"	18 January 2011
A vintage slot machine, a pinball machine used on Happy Days and a 1940s Whizzer motorized bicycle all go up for auction. Jon takes a World War II Soviet flag to a lab to authenticate its blood stain, and not even Paul can escape Cindy's Wall of Shame for people who do not pay their bills.
19	"Declaration of Independence/Concession Wagon"	25 January 2011
The Gallery 63 team auctions a vintage fire truck, a 19th-century copy of the Declaration of Independence and a Tiffany grandfather clock, and races to fix an antique concession wagon that breaks during offload.
20	"Ouiji Board/Richard Petty Jeep"	2 February 2011
Up on the block: a 1946 Willys Jeep restored by Richard Petty, a Rock-Ola jukebox, and a Ouija board that becomes the basis for a prank on Cindy.
21	"Delorean Time Machine/Speakeasy Piano"	9 August 2011
Up on the block: Video Bob (real name Robert Moseley) auctioned off an exact replica of the Back to the Future Delorean, authenticated by Kevin Pike, the original creator. He also attempted, but failed to sell off another DeLorean replica in Pawn Stars.
22	"WWII Harley-Davidson/1800s Gambler's Watch-Gun"	9 August 2011

== Broadcast ==
Repeats of the series are currently airing on the digital broadcast network Quest.
