= Salma K. Farid Academy =

Private school in Connecticut, United States

Coordinates: 41.3464°N 72.9239°W

Information
- Established: 2008; 18 years ago
- Age: 3 to 18

Salma K. Farid Academy (SKF Academy) is a private non-profit Islamic coeducational preschool and elementary school in Hamden, Connecticut.

Its curriculum, and practices are based solely on the Quran and Sunnah. The school serves children between the ages of 3 and 12 years old during the day, and up to 18 years after school. It also offers adult classes in the evenings.

== History ==
The school opened in October 2008 under the sponsorship of Tariq Farid and his family. It is named in honor of Farid's mother, Salma K. Farid, who died in 2005.
