= Elam Ives House =

Historic house in Hamden, Connecticut, US

- U.S. National Register of Historic Places
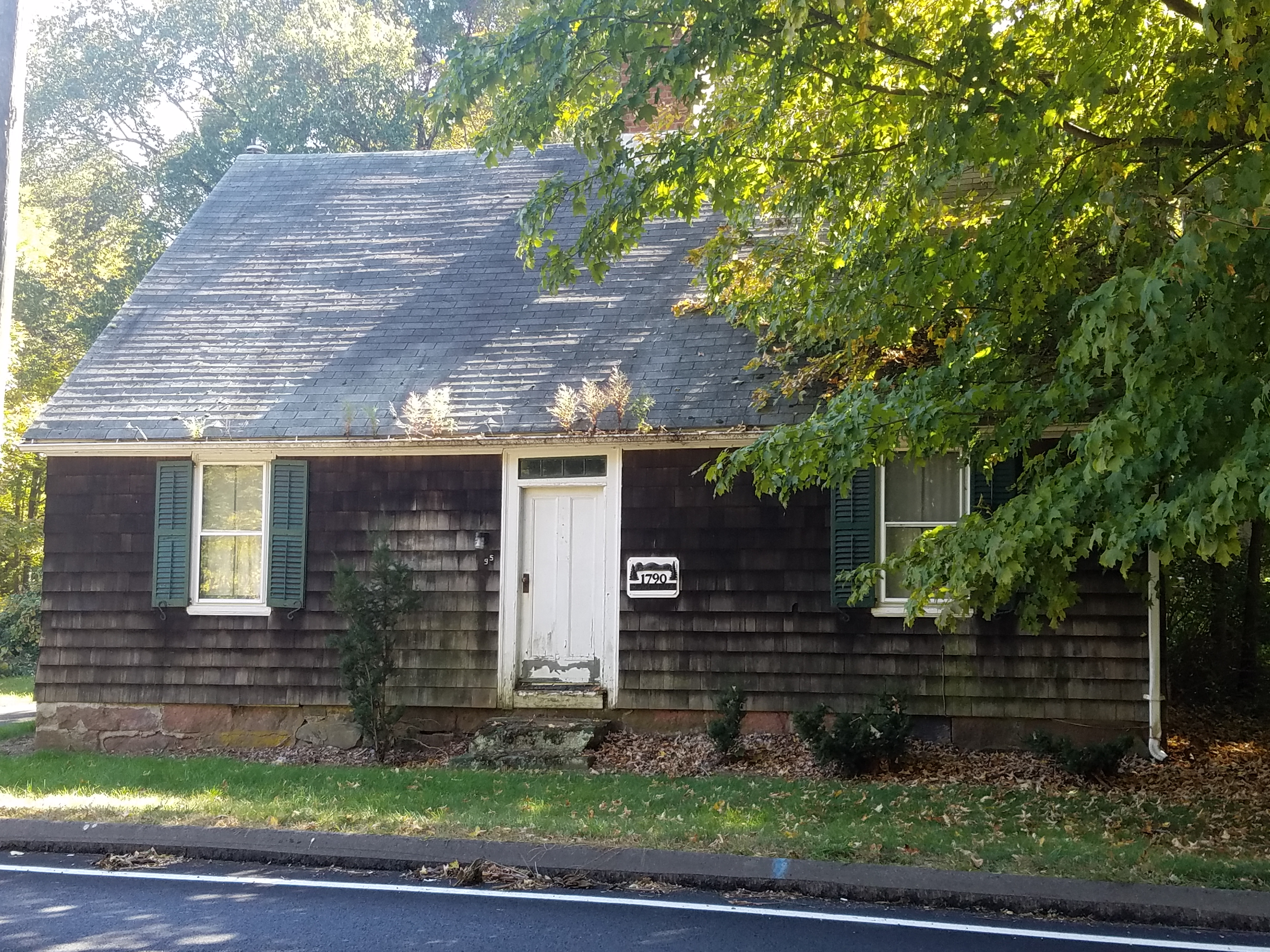

- Location within Connecticut Location within the United States
- Location: 95 Ives Street, Hamden, Connecticut
- Coordinates: 41°24′13″N 72°53′43″W
- Area: 0.4 acres (0.16 ha)
- Built: 1790
- Architectural style: Colonial, Postmedieval English
- NRHP reference No.: 10000832
- Added to NRHP: October 12, 2010

The Elam Ives House is a historic house at 95 Ives Street in Hamden, Connecticut. Built in 1790, it is one of Hamden's oldest houses, and was home to the economically important Ives family, from whom the Ivesville area takes its name. It was listed on the National Register of Historic Places in 2010.

== Description and history ==
The Elam Ives House is located in central eastern Hamden, on the south side of Ives Street (Connecticut Route 22) just west of the Mill River. It is a 1 1/2-story wood-frame structure, with a gabled roof, central chimney, and shingled exterior. Its main facade is three bays wide, with sash windows on either side of the central entrance. The entrance is simply framed, with a four-light transom window above. The interior is said to be relatively unaltered from its period of construction about 1790.

The house was built in 1790 by Elam Ives Sr., who farmed the land and engaged in other business pursuits. Ives' sons became active in industrializing the area, taking advantage of the failure of the Farmington Canal to convert its water power to productive business uses. The area became known as Ivesville through the extensive business activities of James Ives; other sons were also involved in the carriage making industry that became important in Hamden and New Haven.

The house was acquired in 1912 by the local water authority, due to its location in a sensitive watershed area. It has owned the property since, occasionally renting it out.

== See also ==
- National Register of Historic Places listings in New Haven County, Connecticut
