= Mount Carmel Congregational Church and Parish House =

Historic church in Connecticut, United States

- U.S. National Register of Historic Places
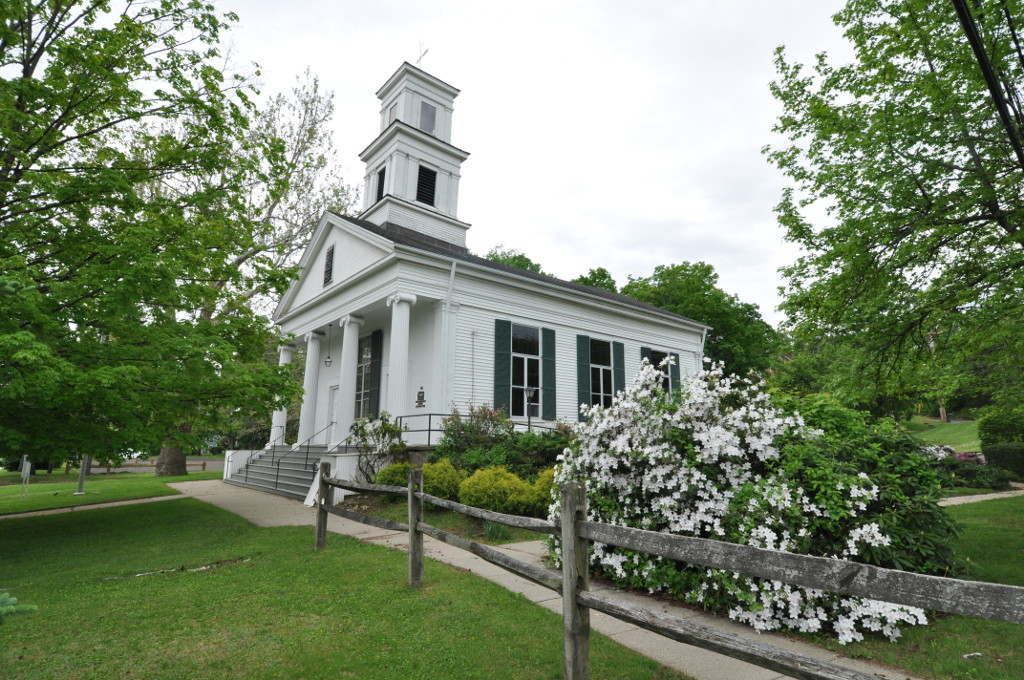

- Location within Connecticut Location within the United States
- Location: 3280 and 3284 Whitney Avenue, 195 Sherman Avenue, Hamden, Connecticut
- Coordinates: 41°24′50″N 72°54′9″W
- Area: 2 acres (0.81 ha)
- Built: 1840
- Architectural style: Colonial Revival, Greek Revival
- NRHP reference No.: 91001847
- Added to NRHP: December 27, 1991

The Mount Carmel Congregational Church and Parish House is a historic church complex at 3280 and 3284 Whitney Avenue and 195 Sherman Avenue in Hamden, Connecticut. It consists of an 1840 Greek Revival church with a tetrastyle temple front portico, and a 1911 Colonial Revival parish house. A non-contributing 1925 sexton's house is also on the property. The church is considered to be Hamden's finest example of Greek Revival architecture, and the parish house one of its finest Colonial Revival houses. The property was listed on the National Register of Historic Places in 1991.

== Description and history ==
The Mount Carmel Congregational Church complex is located in northern Hamden, on the West Side of Whitney Avenue (Connecticut Route 10) at its Junction with Sherman Avenue. The church occupies the south end of the property, facing east toward Whitney Avenue. It is a single-story wood-frame structure, with a gabled roof and clapboarded exterior. A two-stage square tower rises above the roof, with corner pilasters and a cornice on each stage and a cross as a spire. The building is encircled by an entablature, and is fronted by a Greek temple portico, with fluted Ionic columns rising to a fully pedimented gable. The parish house, located to its north, is also a single story, with a hip roof and a columned entrance portico that echoes that of the church.

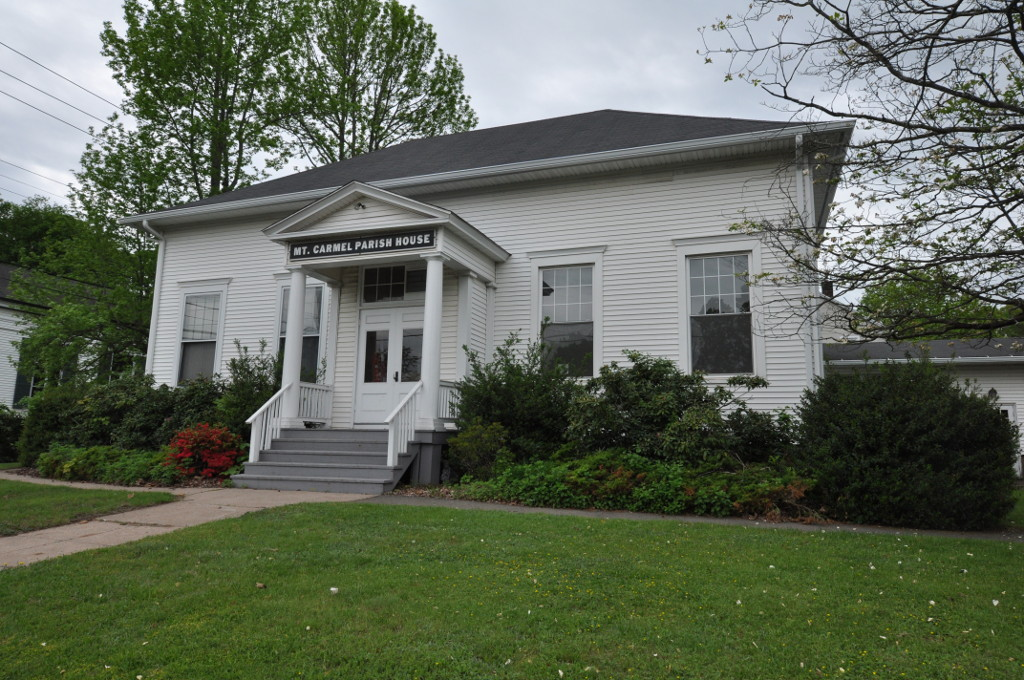
The parish house

The Mount Carmel congregation was organized in 1757, when the area was still part of New Haven. Its first meeting house was located north of this site, and was where the town of Hamden's first town meeting was held in 1786. By the 1820s, the need for a new building was apparent to the congregants, and the present church was completed in 1840 after a lengthy debate and planning process. The church interior was remodeled in 1870, at which time its pipe organ was installed. The parish house was built in 1911; it was originally separated from the church by Sherman Avenue, which was realigned to its north in 1979.

== See also ==
- National Register of Historic Places listings in New Haven County, Connecticut
