= Hamden Memorial Town Hall =

- U.S. National Register of Historic Places
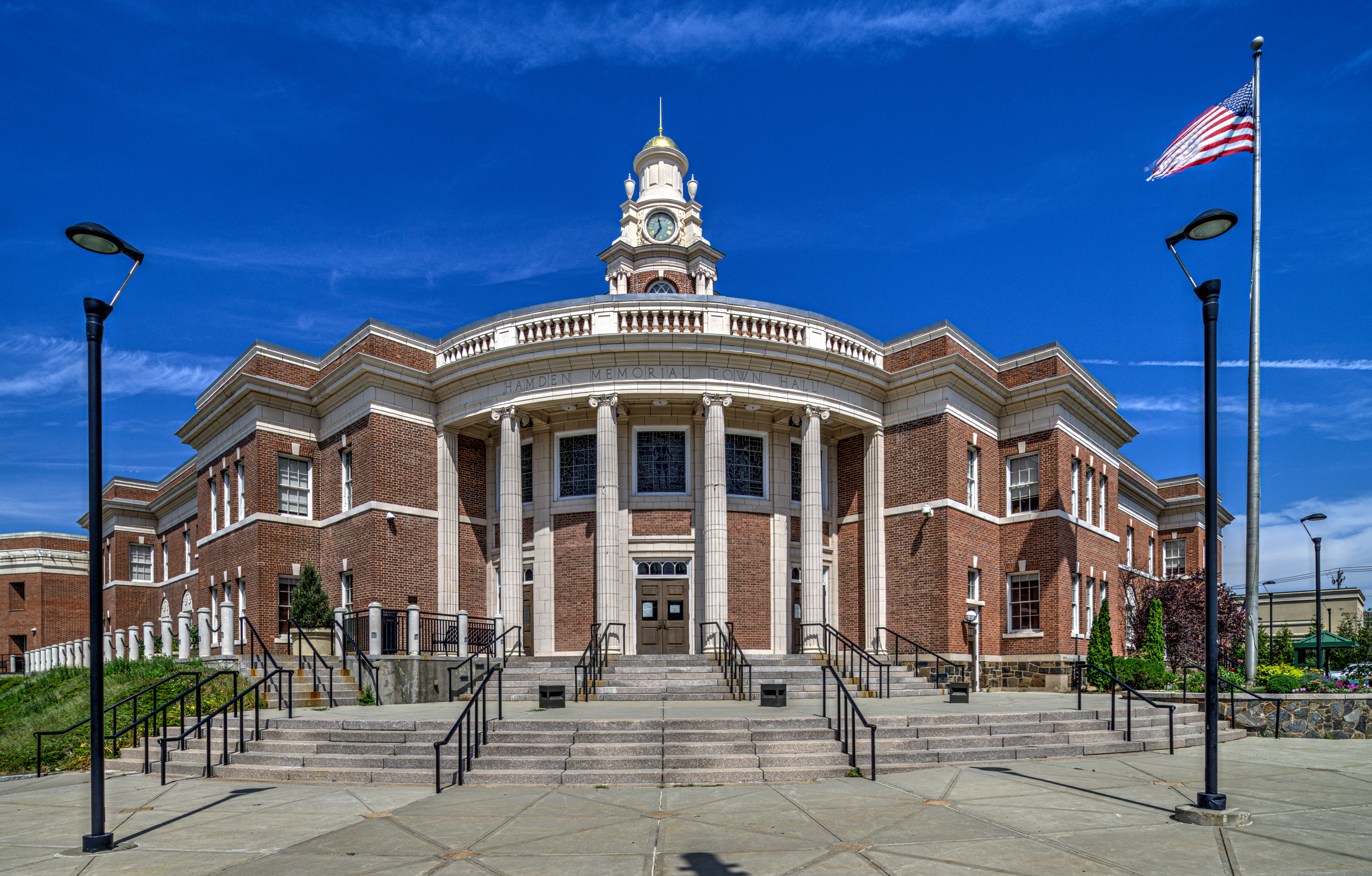

- Location within Connecticut Location within the United States
- Interactive map showing the location for Hamden Memorial Town Hall
- Location: 2372 Whitney Avenue, Hamden, Connecticut
- Coordinates: 41°23′02″N 72°54′09″W
- Area: 1 acre (0.40 ha)
- Built: 1924
- Built by: M. J. Gibbud Company
- Architect: Richard Williams
- Architectural style: Colonial Revival, Classical Revival
- NRHP reference No.: 01000355
- Added to NRHP: April 12, 2001

The Hamden Memorial Town Hall houses the municipal offices of the town of Hamden, Connecticut, and serves as a memorial to its military service people. Located at Junction of Dixwell and Whitney Avenues CT 10 and completed in 1924, it is a prominent local example of Colonial and Classical Revival architecture. It was listed on the National Register of Historic Places in 2001.

== Description and history ==
Hamden Memorial Town Hall is located in Central Eastern Hamden, near the center of a commercial district at the Junction of Dixwell and Whitney Avenues CT 10, major arteries passing through the town. It is a two-story masonry structure, built out of load-bearing brick, cast stone, and concrete, with some steel reinforcement. Its exterior is predominantly red brick, with concrete stringcourses, entablatures and cornices. Its dominant feature is the main entrance, which is set in a semi-elliptical curving colonnade at the street corner. The colonnade has two-story fluted round columns with Ionic capitals, and is topped by a balustrade. An ornate three-stage clock tower rises above. The entrance leads to a large oval lobby, which serves as the town's war memorial.

Hamden was originally part of New Haven, and was separately incorporated in 1784. Initially an agricultural community, it rapidly became a residential suburb of its urban neighbor in the early 20th century. The town hall was completed in 1924 to a design by architect Richard Williams, a former partner of William H. Allen of New Haven and a Hamden resident. It cost $164,000 to build, an unusually large sum for the period. It is stylistically Colonial Revival in form, but exhibits a significant number of Neo-Classical details.

== See also ==
- National Register of Historic Places listings in New Haven County, Connecticut
