= Highville Charter School =

School in Connecticut, United States

Coordinates: 41.3474°N 72.9222°W

Information
- Established: 1998; 28 years ago
- Grades: Pre-Kindergarten - Grade 8
- Enrollment: c.300
- Website: www.highvillecharter.com

Highville Charter School for International Studies is a charter school situated on Leeder Hill Drive, Hamden, Connecticut, USA. It was founded by Lyndon Pitter and opened in Fall 1998. Highville educates pupils from pre-kindergarten to Grade 8 with around 300 on the roll. Highville changed their name to Highville Charter School and increase their enrollment to 12th grade. The high school is called Highville Change Academy. Highville Charter School relocated to 1 Science Park New Haven, CT 06511 in 2017.

Highville is notable in that all teaching is carried out in an international context. In the school, each classroom is named after a country. It also has branded a travel agency website.
