= Eli Whitney Technical High School =

Technical high school in Hamden, Connecticut, USA

Location
- 100 Fairview Avenue; Hamden, Connecticut 06514; United States
- Coordinates: 41°20′36″N 72°56′37″W

Information
- Founded: 1956 (70 years ago)
- CEEB code: 070259
- Principal: Joseph DiNatale
- Grades: 9-12
- Enrollment: 582 (2023-2024)
- Website: whitney.cttech.org

Eli Whitney Technical High School, or Whitney Tech, is a technical high school located in Hamden, Connecticut, which receives students from many nearby towns. Eli Whitney Tech is part of the Connecticut Technical Education and Career System.

== Technologies ==
In addition to a complete academic program leading to a high school diploma, students attending Whitney Tech receive training in one of the following trades and technologies:

- Automotive Technology
- Building and Civil Construction
- Culinary Arts
- Electrical
- Graphic Design
- Hairdressing and Cosmetology
- Health Technology
- Mechanical Design and Engineering Technology
- Plumbing and Heating
- Precision Machining Technology
