= Hamden High School =

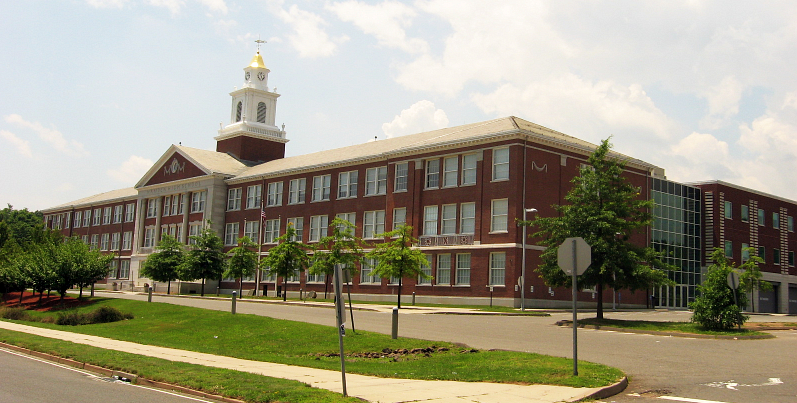

Location
- 2040 Dixwell Avenue, Hamden, Connecticut 06514; United States; 41°22′03″N 72°55′17″W

Information
- Type: Public secondary school
- Motto: To Everyone There Openeth A Way
- Established: 1935 (91 years ago)
- CEEB code: 070260
- Principal: Eric Jackson
- Teaching staff: 124.00 (on an FTE basis)
- Grades: 9-12
- Enrollment: 1,661 (2023-2024)
- Student to teacher ratio: 13.40
- Colors: Green and gold
- Athletics conference: Southern Connecticut Conference
- Nickname: Green Dragons
- Website: www.hamden.org/hhs
- Hamden High School
- U.S. National Register of Historic Places
- Location within Connecticut
- Coordinates: 41°22′03″N 72°55′17″W
- Area: 25.66 acres (10.38 ha)
- Built: 1935
- Architect: Foote, Roy W.; DeMaio, Salvatore
- Architectural style: Colonial Revival
- NRHP reference No.: 94001378
- Added to NRHP: December 12, 1994

Hamden High School is a four-year high school for grades 9 through 12. It is located at 2040 Dixwell Avenue CT 10 in Hamden, Connecticut. It is part of the Hamden Public School System and is the only public high school within the town of Hamden.

The school was built in 1935 and is still in operation today, although it has gone through numerous renovations. Most recent was the removal of previous additions along with part of the original building, and the addition of 3 additional wings, all of which are attached to the original front wing to form a square. One of its most notable features is a golden cupola atop a clock tower, at the front of the building. Below the clock tower sits a small circular window, with two draping plaster banners on the sides seeming to form the letter 'M,' and giving the building the nickname "the MOM building."

While most students come from the Hamden Middle School, many others come from private and magnet schools in the surrounding area.

== Campus ==
Hamden High School's historic main building was listed on the National Register of Historic Places in December 1994. The school's lobby is decorated with murals showing scenes from Hamden's history. The murals, which form a frieze around the upper perimeter of the lobby walls, were painted by Hamden artist Salvatore DeMaio, a Hamden artist who was awarded the Prix de Rome in 1930, and were completed in 1936.

== Arts ==
Hamden High School is home to an arts department which includes courses in music, theatre and the visual arts. The visual arts department offers classes in painting, drawing, ceramics, photography and creating art with computers.

== Athletics ==
Hamden High School competes in the CIAC of Connecticut, within the Southern Connecticut Conference, and class LL. Sports offered are:

Fall:

- Badminton (Women)
- Cheerleading
- Cross-Country
- Field-Hockey (Women)
- Football
- Soccer
- Swimming (Women)
- Volleyball (Women)

Winter:

- Basketball
- Cheerleading
- Gymnastics
- Ice Hockey
- Indoor Track & Field
- Swimming (Men)

Spring:

- Baseball (Men)
- Golf (Men)
- Lacrosse
- Softball (Women)
- Tennis
- Track & Field

Wins in CIAC State Championships
| Sport | Class | Year(s) |
|---|---|---|
| Baseball | L | 1965 |
| Baseball | LL | 1977 |
| Basketball (girls) | LL | 2023, 2024 |
| Dance | Pom | 2009, 2010, 2011, 2012, 2013, 2015, 2016, 2018, 2020, 2022, 2023, 2024, 2025, 2026 |
| Dance | Kickline | 2010, 2011, 2012, 2013, 2015, 2016, 2018, 2020, 2022, 2023, 2024, 2025, 2026 |
| Golf (boys) | n/a | 1966 |
| Golf (boys) | I | 2003 |
| Ice Hockey (boys) | I | 1948, 1950, 1952, 1965, 1966, 1967, 1968, 1970, 1971, 1973, 1974, 1975, 1976, 1986, 1989, 2009, 2010 |
| Softball | LL | 1977 |
| Swimming (boys) | LL | 1974 |
| Swimming (boys) | Open | 1974 |
| Track and field (indoor, boys) | LL | 2010, 2025 |
| Track and field (outdoor, boys) | LL | 1980, 1999, 2026 |
| Track and field (outdoor, boys) | Open | 1980 |

== Notable alumni ==
- Scott Burrell, professional basketball and minor league baseball player
- Joe Castiglione, long time radio announcer for the Boston Red Sox.
- Lawrence DeNardis, U.S. House of Representatives and president of the University of New Haven
- Rich Diana, football player for the Miami Dolphins
- Ed Ellis, professional football player
- Paul Fusco, puppeteer, voice-over artist, and character actor. He is best known as the puppeteer and voice of the title character on the sitcom ALF.
- James J. Greco, CEO and President of Sbarro
- Linda Greenhouse, Pulitzer Prize-winning journalist of The New York Times
- Aisha Harris, American writer, editor, and podcaster.
- Zakiya Dalila Harris, American author
- Anttaj Hawthorne, professional football player
- Jen Hudak, professional freestyle skier
- Frederick W. Kagan, architect of the Iraq War troop surge of 2007
- Ron Monaco, professional football player
- Bobby Myers, professional football player
- Jonathan Quick, professional hockey player and Stanley Cup champion for the Los Angeles Kings
- Anthony Sagnella, professional football player
- Lori Verderame, fine art and antiques appraiser

== See also ==
- List of high school football rivalries (less than 100 years old)
- National Register of Historic Places listings in New Haven County, Connecticut
