= Hamden, Connecticut =

Hamden
- Town
- Town of Hamden
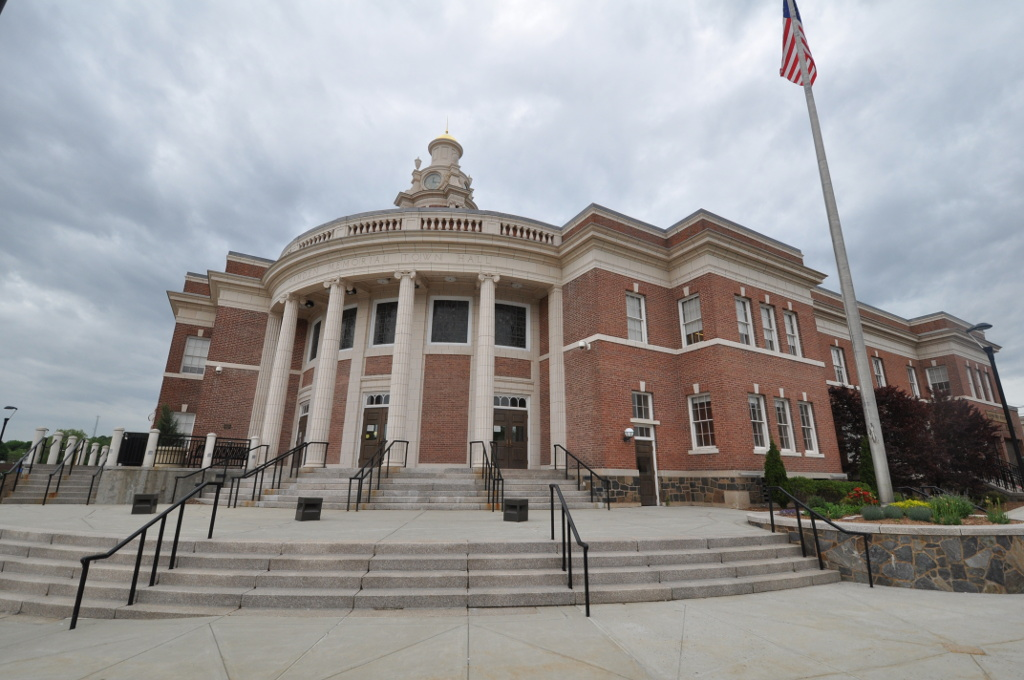
- Hamden Memorial Town Hall

- Flag Seal
- Motto: "Land of the Sleeping Giant"
- Interactive map of Hamden
- Coordinates: 41°23′52″N 72°55′18″W
- Country: United States
- U.S. state: Connecticut
- County: New Haven
- Region: South Central CT
- Incorporated: 1786

Government
  - Type: Mayor-council
  - Mayor: Adam Sendroff (D)

Area
  - Total: 33.4 sq mi (86.6 km^{2})
  - Land: 32.9 sq mi (85.2 km^{2})
  - Water: 0.54 sq mi (1.4 km^{2})
- Elevation: 184 ft (56 m)

Population (2020)
  - Total: 61,169
  - Density: 1,860/sq mi (718/km^{2})
- Time zone: UTC−5 (Eastern)
  - Summer (DST): UTC−4 (Eastern)
- ZIP Codes: 06514, 06517–06518
- Area codes: 203/475
- FIPS code: 09-35650
- GNIS feature ID: 0213440
- Website: hamden.com

Hamden is a town in New Haven County, Connecticut, United States. The town's nickname is "The Land of the Sleeping Giant". The town is part of the South Central Connecticut Planning Region. The population was 61,169 at the 2020 census.

== History ==
The peaceful Quinnipiac were the first inhabitants of the area that includes what is now known as Hamden. They held the land now known as Sleeping Giant Mountain in great esteem.

In spring 1638, Theophilus Eaton and the Reverend John Davenport purchased, from Quinnipiac Chief Momauguin, the land that would become the settlement of New Haven Colony. Later that November, Eaton expanded the settlement by acquiring 130 square miles from Mattabesset Chief Montowese. This tract extended the original settlement 10 miles north along the Quinnipiac River, with an additional 8 miles to the east and 5 mi. to the west. This piece of land included what would eventually become Hamden. The payment was made with "11 coats of trucking cloth and a fine coat for the chief." It was settled by Puritans as part of the town of New Haven.

It remained a part of New Haven until 1786 when 1,400 local residents incorporated the area as a separate town, naming it after the English statesman John Hampden.

Largely developed as a nodal collection of village-like settlements (which remain distinct today), including Mount Carmel (home to Quinnipiac University), Whitneyville, Spring Glen, West Woods, and Highwood, Hamden has a long-standing industrial history. In 1798, four years after Eli Whitney began manufacturing the cotton gin in New Haven, he made arms for the U.S. government at a mill site in Hamden, where a waterfall provided a good source of power. At that site, Whitney introduced the modern era of mass production with the concept of interchangeable parts.

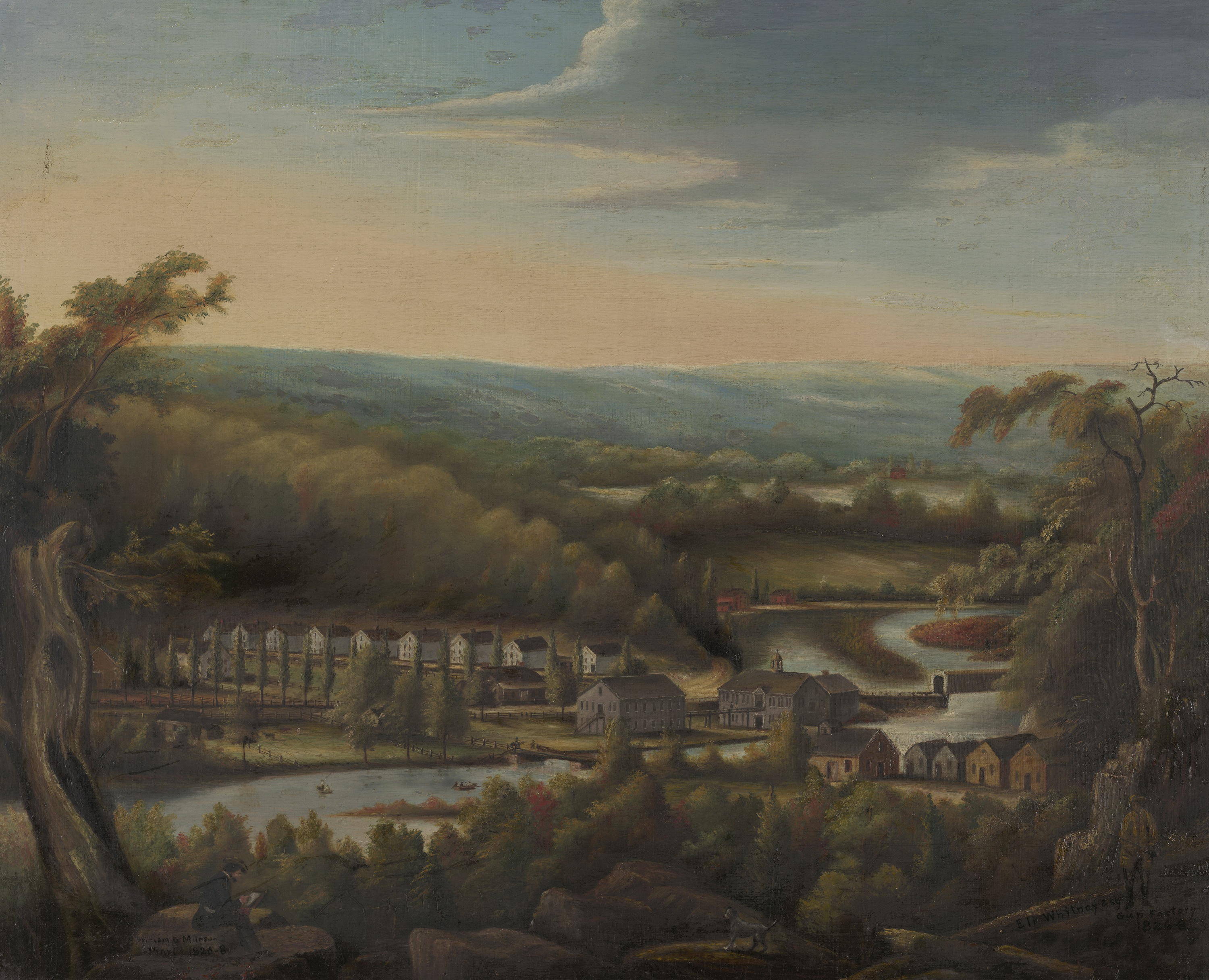
An 1827 painting of Whitneyville by William Giles Munson.

Whitney constructed stone houses for his employees in the nearby area, which is still referred to as Whitneyville; this is believed to be the first example of employer-provided homes in U.S. history. In 1806, the dam that Eli Whitney built at the mill site was enlarged to create a reservoir, Lake Whitney. The first truss bridge in the United States was erected nearby over the Mill River in Whitneyville in 1823, but has since been replaced.

The Farmington Canal, which boats traveled from New Haven northward, passed through Hamden between 1825 and 1848 until it was supplanted by railroad travel. The canal right-of-way has become, in recent years, a popular walking and bicycling trail, passing by some of the well-preserved locks of the canal, as well as some of Hamden's oldest sites. Before its use as a walking and bicycling trail, many local residents rode their motocross bikes on the Farmington Canal.

During the 19th and early 20th centuries, Hamden received a steady influx of immigrants, most notably from Italy and Ireland. To this day, a large part of Greater New Haven's Italian-American community resides in Hamden.

During the post-war period, Hamden underwent significant suburban development. Much of the southern section of town is urbanized and is difficult to distinguish from neighboring New Haven. The northern section of town, however, retains a more rural character, and has the distinct neighborhood of Mount Carmel. This area of town is the location of the unique Sleeping Giant hill formation that is the source of the town's nickname.

== Geography ==
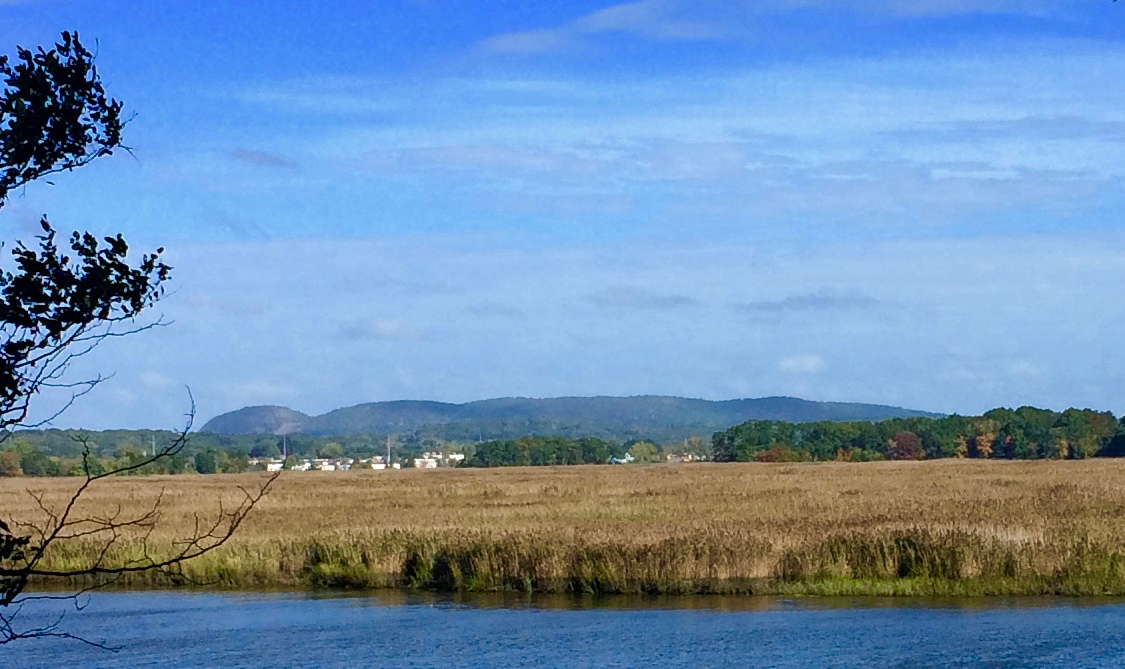
Hamden Connecticut's Sleeping Giant Mountain from the Quinnipiac river.

According to the United States Census Bureau, the town has a total area of 33.3 square miles (86 km^{2}), of which 32.8 square miles (85 km^{2}) is land and 0.5 square miles (1.3 km^{2}), or 1.62%, is water. The town features the Mill River, which runs from the northern part of town, is dammed to form Lake Whitney, and flows from there to Long Island Sound. The town also has the Quinnipiac River and Lake Wintergreen, as well as numerous small streams.

=== Neighborhoods ===
- Augerville
- Beecher Heights
- Centerville (Town Center)
- Dunbar Hill
- Hamden Plains
- Highwood
- Mix District
- Mount Carmel
- Pine Rock
- Spring Glen
- State Street (East Side)
- West Woods
- Whitneyville

=== Notable areas ===
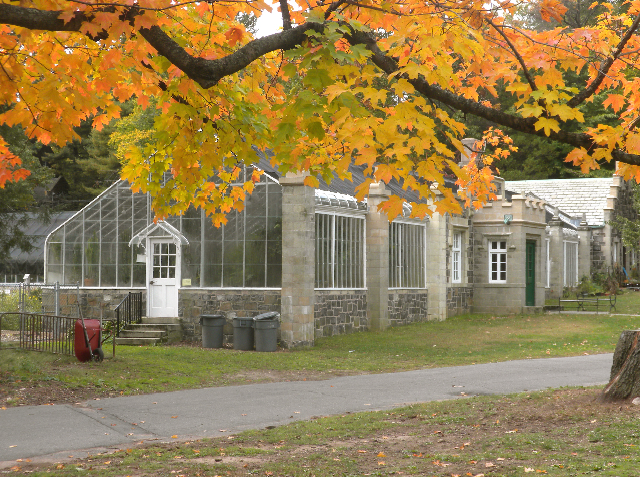
Edgerton Park Conservancy

The Town Hall at the center of Hamden has a distinctive appearance. The rotunda includes commemorative stained glass windows. Across the street is Freedom Park, which contains a fountain with concrete stepping stones leading to a sign that pleads for peace in several different languages. The Town recently completed new facilities for the police and fire departments in the newly renovated Town Hall.

Hamden was host to the Ghost Parking Lot, a notable roadside public art installation by James Wines located in front of the Hamden Plaza shopping center in Hamden's commercial district on Dixwell Avenue. Erected in 1978, it consisted of 15 car hulks, specially treated and encased in asphalt. Although featured in over 100 art books, the attraction was torn down in 2003 due to the excessive cost of restoration and repair.

=== Adjacent municipalities ===
Hamden is bordered by six other towns:

- To its north, Cheshire and Wallingford
- To its east, North Haven
- To its south, New Haven
- To its west, Woodbridge and Bethany

== Government ==
Hamden is governed by a mayor-council form of government, with a 15-member legislative council. Six councilors are elected at large while the other nine are elected by district. Town elections are held biennially during odd years in November. Other elected positions in the town government are the Town Clerk and members of the Board of Education. Positions in the various town boards and commissions are generally appointed by the Mayor subject to approval by the Legislative Council.

Adam Sendroff became the town's 15th mayor in November 2025. Past mayors of Hamden are:

- Lauren Garrett, 2021-2025
- Curt Balzano Leng, 2015–2021
- Scott Jackson, 2009–2015
- Craig Henrici, 2005–2009
- Carl Amento, 1999–2005
- Barbara DeNicola, 1997–1999
- Lillian Clayman, 1991–1997
- Johnny Carusone, 1987–1991
- John DeNicola Jr., 1985–1987
- Peter Villano, 1981–1985
- Dick Harris, 1979–1981
- Lucien DiMeo, 1973–1979
- Bill Adams, 1967–1973
- John DeNicola Sr., 1965–1967

John DeNicola Sr. was the town's last first selectman before becoming the town’s first mayor, in November 1965.

== Economy ==
=== Top employers ===
Top employers in Hamden according to the town's 2022 Comprehensive Annual Financial Report

#	Employer	# of Employees
1	Town of Hamden/Board of Education	1,612
2	Quinnipiac University	850–900
3	Arden House	300–325
4	Whitney Center	300–325
5	CT Transit	250–300
6	AAA Hamden	250–300
7	ACES	200–250
8	Home Depot	150–200
9	XL Care Agencies of CT	150–200
10	Stop & Shop	100–150

The main industries in the town are retail trade, computer products, manufacture of wire and cable, concrete, pump mixer products, fabricated metals, construction and business services. Business services account for 49.4% of employment in the town, with retail trade accounting for 22.8%, and manufacturing accounting for 9.6%. The top four major employers are the Town government and school district, Quinnipiac University, Harborside Health Care, and Area Cooperative Education Services (ACES).

Shaw's Supermarket was one of the top five major employers, but the Hamden Shaw's was sold to ShopRite in a sale of Shaw's Connecticut stores announced on February 13, 2010. The Shaw's supermarket has been shut down and the new ShopRite store has opened.

Hamden is a residential suburb for New Haven, with more residents commuting to work in New Haven than residents working in Hamden.

== Transportation ==
The Wilbur Cross Parkway runs through the center of the town serving as a connection to Hartford to the north and the New York metropolitan area to the south. The town is connected to Interstate 91 via Connecticut Route 40, a spur expressway to the Mount Carmel section of town.

The major north-south thoroughfare through Hamden is Whitney Avenue, which also is State Road 707 from the New Haven line until Dixwell Avenue and then Route 10 until the Cheshire border. Named after Eli Whitney, it runs past Whitney's old factory, now the Eli Whitney Museum, as well as through Whitneyville.

The most nearly east-west thoroughfare is Dixwell Avenue, which also is Route 10 from its intersection with Arch St. / Morse St. near the New Haven line until Whitney Avenue and then State Road 717 until the North Haven border. It was named for John Dixwell, and is the only of the three judges roads from New Haven that enters Hamden.

Public transportation is provided by Connecticut Transit New Haven. The main bus routes in the town are the Dixwell Avenue (238, formerly D) and the Whitney Avenue (228/229, formerly J) routes. Other secondary routes serving the town are the State Street (224, formerly M), Winchester Avenue (234, formerly O), and Shelton Avenue (237, formerly G) bus routes.

North Haven Station, a station on the Hartford Line commuter railroad, is planned be built next to the Hamden–North Haven border near the Route 40 Connector, serving both towns.

Tweed New Haven Airport (HVN) in East Haven and Bradley International Airport (BDL) in Windsor Locks are the closest commercial airports to Hamden.

== Education ==
=== Public ===
The public school district for the town, Hamden Public Schools, operates eight elementary schools, a middle school, and a high school, enrolling a total of about 5,398 students.

==== Elementary schools ====
- Alice Peck Early Learning Center (Pre-K, with an enrollment of about 153 students), located on Hillfield Road
- Bear Path Elementary School (K–6, with an enrollment of about 446 students), located on Kirk Road
- Church Street Elementary School (K–6, with an enrollment of about 320 students), located on Church Street
- Dunbar Hill Elementary School (K–6, with an enrollment of about 279 students), located on Lane Street
- Helen Street Elementary School (K–6, with an enrollment of about 334 students), located on Helen Street
- Ridge Hill Elementary School (K–6, with an enrollment of about 343 students), located on Carew Road
- Shepherd Glen Elementary School (K–6, with an enrollment of about 308 students), located on Skiff Street Extension, established in 1972
- Spring Glen Elementary School (K–6, with an enrollment of about 440 students), located on Whitney Avenue
- West Woods Elementary School (K–6, with an enrollment of about 350 students), located on West Todd Street

==== Middle school ====
- Hamden Middle School (grades 7 and 8, with an enrollment of about 890 students)

==== High school ====
- Hamden High School (grades 9–12, with an enrollment of about 1,700 students)

==== Magnet schools ====
In addition to the town's public schools, Hamden is the site of two magnet schools, Wintergreen Magnet School (Kindergarten through grade 8) and Highville Mustard Seed Charter School (high school).

==== Technical high school ====
Eli Whitney Technical High School is located in Hamden.

=== Private ===
Hamden is home to several private and religious schools, including:

- Hamden Hall Country Day School (grades Pre-K to 12th)
- Laurel Oaks Adventist School (grades Pre-K to 8th)
- Lorraine D. Foster Day School
- Sacred Heart Academy (grades 9–12)
- SKF Academy
- St. Rita School (Roman Catholic, grades Pre-K to 8)
- St. Stephen School (Roman Catholic, grades Pre-K to 8, closed in 2017)
- West Woods Christian Academy (evangelical Christian, grades K–12)

=== Colleges and universities ===
- Quinnipiac University, which has an enrollment of about 9,000 students, has its Mount Carmel and York Hill campuses in Hamden, with a third campus in North Haven.
- Mount Sacred Heart College, a Catholic women's college associated with Sacred Heart Academy, closed in 1997.
- Paier College of Art, formerly in Hamden, moved to Bridgeport and changed its name to Paier College in 2021.

Small portions of the campuses of Southern Connecticut State University and Albertus Magnus College in New Haven extend just over the city line into southernmost Hamden, as do a few outlying buildings of Yale University.

=== 19th-century schools ===
- The Rectory school, a boys boarding school, was established in 1843 by Reverend Charles W. Everest, the rector of the Grace Church. It was located in Centerville and at its height had 65 students. It closed in 1895.

== Quality of life ==
Within the town limits, there are 16 banks, six lodging facilities, and 29 day care facilities. There are no hospitals in the town, although it is close to the major hospitals in New Haven. In 2004, the crime rate was 2,084 per 100,000 residents, lower than the statewide average of 2,981 per 100,000 residents. The town library has 166,358 volumes (as of 2001).

Electricity in the town is provided by the United Illuminating company; natural gas is provided by the Southern Connecticut Gas company; the water provider is the South Central Connecticut Regional Water Authority; Cable TV is provided by Comcast of New Haven.

There are several parks and museums located in Hamden. Hamden Town Center Park hosts fireworks, free concerts, outdoor movies, and other seasonal festivals. Other parks include the Eli Whitney Museum in Whitneyville, Ireland’s Great Hunger Museum, parts of West Rock Ridge State Park (including Lake Wintergreen) and East Rock Park (including the Pardee Rose Garden), Brooksvale Park and the adjoining Mount Sanford block of Naugatuck State Forest, and the Sleeping Giant State Park. The Farmington Canal Trail runs through the town. Two blue-blazed hiking trails, the Quinnipiac Trail and the Regicides Trail, also run through the town.

The Jonathan Dickerman House, listed on the National Register of Historic Places, is located in Mount Carmel. Hamden also has an all-volunteer orchestra, the Hamden Symphony Orchestra, providing concerts throughout the year.

== Demographics ==
Historical population
Census	Pop.	Note	%±
1790	1,422		—
1800	1,482		4.2%
1810	1,716		15.8%
1820	1,687		−1.7%
1830	1,666		−1.2%
1840	1,797		7.9%
1850	2,164		20.4%
1860	2,725		25.9%
1870	3,028		11.1%
1880	3,408		12.5%
1890	3,882		13.9%
1900	4,626		19.2%
1910	5,850		26.5%
1920	8,611		47.2%
1930	19,020		120.9%
1940	23,373		22.9%
1950	29,715		27.1%
1960	41,056		38.2%
1970	49,357		20.2%
1980	51,071		3.5%
1990	52,434		2.7%
2000	56,913		8.5%
2010	60,960		7.1%
2020	61,169		0.3%
U.S. Decennial Census

As of the census of 2010, there were 60,690 people, 23,727 households, and 14,300 families residing in the town. The population density was 1,867.3 inhabitants per square mile (721.0/km^{2}). There were 25,114 housing units at an average density of 769.2 per square mile (297.0/km^{2}). The racial makeup of the town was 68.45% White, 20.19% African American, 0.15% Native American, 5.47% Asian, 0.03% Pacific Islander, 3.00% from other races, and 2.72% from two or more races. Hispanic or Latino of any race were 8.74% of the population.

There were 23,727 households, out of which 25.3% had children under the age of 18 living with them, 44.4% were married couples living together, 12.5% had a female householder with no husband present, and 39.7% were non-families. 31.2% of all households were made up of individuals, and 12.7% had someone living alone who was 65 years of age or older. The average household size was 2.37 and the average family size was 3.01.

In the town, the population was spread out, with 24.4% under the age of 20, 10.6% from 20 to 24, 24.6% from 25 to 44, 25.4% from 45 to 64, and 15.0% who were 65 years of age or older. The median age was 37.4 years. For every 100 females, there were 82.6 males. For every 100 females age 18 and over, there were 80.7 males.

The median income for a household in the town was $66,695, and the median income for a family was $88,613. The per capita income for the town was $34,596. About 3.8% of families and 6.8% of the population were below the poverty line, including 6.3% of those under age 18 and 5.4% of those age 65 or over.

Voter registration and party enrollment as of October 19, 2026
Party	Active voters	Inactive voters	Total voters	Percentage
Democratic	19,892	1,406	21,298	53.76%
Republican	4,077	317	4,394	11.09%
Unaffiliated	12,181	1,186	13,267	33.49%
Minor parties	500	57	557	1.41%
Total	36,650	2,966	39,616	100%

== Notable people ==
- Sidney Altman (1939–2022), Nobel Laureate
- Afa Anoaʻi Jr., former WWE professional wrestler known as Manu
- Jennifer Barnhart, puppeteer, born and grew up in town
- Glenn Beck, conservative television personality, lived in Hamden from 1992 to 2000 where he co-hosted The Glenn and Pat Show, a morning radio program on KC101
- Ernest Borgnine (1917–2012), actor, was born in town in 1917
- Scott Burrell, two-sport athlete and longtime professional basketball player, grew up in town
- Bruce Campbell, former NFL tackle, born in town
- John Carpenter, the first winner of Who Wants to Be a Millionaire
- Joe Castiglione, former TV play-by-play man for the Cleveland Indians and Boston Red Sox
- Willis H. Downs, Medal of Honor recipient
- Paul Fusco, the voice, creator, and puppeteer of ALF, grew up in town
- Linedy Genao, Broadway actress, known for playing the role of Cinderella in Andrew Lloyd Webber's Bad Cinderella
- James J. Greco, former CEO and President of Sbarro, grew up in town
- Linda Greenhouse (born 1947), Pulitzer Prize-winning journalist, grew up in town
- Henry Gruber (1863–1932), baseball player, holds record for most walks allowed in a game at 16
- Donald Hall, poet, named poet laureate of the United States in 2006, grew up in town
- Jean Harris, killer and ex-lover of Dr. Herman Tarnower, the co-author of The Complete Scarsdale Medical Diet
- Anttaj Hawthorne, former Oakland Raiders defensive tackle, grew up in town
- Bob Heussler, voice of the Connecticut Sun and a WFAN broadcaster, has resided in Hamden since 1983
- Alexis Holmes, track and field athlete who has medalled in international competition in the 400 m and 4x400 m relay
- Jen Hudak, professional freeskier
- Jake Hurwitz, comedian, writer and actor, member of the comedy duo Jake and Amir
- Dwayne "The Rock" Johnson, professional wrestler and actor, is an alumnus of Shepherd Glen Elementary School and Hamden Middle School
- Stephen Malawista, medical researcher, co-discoverer of Lyme disease
- Ingram Marshall, American composer
- Robert McVey, hockey player, Gold Medalist at 1960 Olympics
- Steven Novella, podcast host of The Skeptics' Guide to the Universe
- Jaroslav Pelikan (1923–2006), leading scholar in the history of Christianity and medieval intellectual history, resided and died in town
- Jonathan Quick, goaltender for the NHL's New York Rangers
- Anthony Rossomando, of Dirty Pretty Things
- Benjamin Scolnic, author, rabbi, long-time resident
- Dana Terrace, writer, director, storyboard artist, and animator known for creating the Disney Channel animated series, The Owl House
- Alan Trachtenberg, Yale faculty and Yale administrator
- Phil Weinberg, Deputy Chancellor for Teaching and Learning, New York City Department of Education
- Eli Whitney (1765–1825), inventor of the cotton gin
- Thornton Wilder (1897–1975), the playwright, lived in town and is buried in Mount Carmel Cemetery
- Avery Wilson, R&B singer, contestant on The Voice, born and raised in Hamden
- Eddie Wilson (1909–1979), outfielder, born in Hamden
- C. Vann Woodward (1908–1999), preeminent historian focusing on the South and race relations, was a resident of the town at the time of his death

== See also ==
- Door Tree
- 1989 Northeastern United States tornado outbreak
- February 2013 nor'easter
