= Connecticut Route 319 =

State highway in northern Connecticut, US

Route 319
- Orcuttville Road
- Map of Tolland County in northern Connecticut with Route 319 highlighted in red

Route information
- Maintained by CTDOT
- Length: 2.83 mi (4.55 km)
- Existed: 1988–present

Major junctions
- West end: Route 190 in Stafford
- Route 32 in Stafford
- East end: Route 19 in Stafford

Location
- Country: United States
- State: Connecticut

Highway system
- Connecticut State Highway System; Interstate; US; State; SSR; SR; Scenic
← Route 318	→ Route 320

Route 319 is a state highway in northern Connecticut running entirely in Stafford.

== Route description ==
Route 319 begins at an intersection with Route 190 in Stafford and heads east and northeast, crossing Furnace Brook and ending at an intersection with Route 19 in Stafford Hollow. The entire route is known as Orcuttville Road.

== History ==
Orcuttville Road was first designated as a state highway in the 1962 Route Reclassification Act. It was initially assigned as SR 535, an unsigned internal route number. In 1967, the internal route number was changed to SR 611. Route 319 was established from SR 611 as a signed route in 1988 and has had no significant changes since. In 2010, a curve just east of the Route 32 intersection was reconstructed in front of the town's high school to take out the sharp curve that had originally been there, which placed the road slightly north of where it had originally been. The length of Route 319, however, has not been changed.

== Junction list ==
The entire route is in Stafford, Tolland County.

mi	km	Destinations	Notes
0.00	0.00	Route 190 – Somers, Stafford Springs	Western terminus
1.28	2.06	Route 32 – Stafford Springs, Monson, MA	
2.83	4.55	Route 19 – Wales, MA, Stafford Springs	Eastern terminus
1.000 mi = 1.609 km; 1.000 km = 0.621 mi
