= Connecticut Route 19 =

State highway in Tolland County, Connecticut, US

Route 19
- Map of Tolland County in northern Connecticut with Route 19 highlighted in red

Route information
- Maintained by CTDOT
- Length: 6.99 mi (11.25 km)
- Existed: 1932–present

Major junctions
- South end: Route 190 in Stafford
- North end: Route 19 at the Massachusetts state line near Stafford

Location
- Country: United States
- State: Connecticut
- Counties: Tolland

Highway system
- Connecticut State Highway System; Interstate; US; State; SSR; SR; Scenic
← Route 17	→ Route 20

Route 19 is a minor Connecticut state route running from Stafford to the Massachusetts state line. It is 6.99 miles (11.25 km) long and runs north–south, entirely within Stafford. The road interconnects the settlements in the eastern part of the town.

== Route description ==
Route 19 begins as East Street at an intersection with Route 190 in the village of Stafford Springs. It heads northward, meeting Route 319 after about 2.1 miles (3.4 km) in the village of Stafford Hollow. Route 19 then heads northeast for another 2.1 miles (3.4 km), passing through the village of Hydeville, up to the village of Staffordville. In Staffordville, Route 19 turns north along Wales Road, passing along the Staffordville Reservoir towards the Massachusetts state line. Across the state line the road continues as Massachusetts Route 19 (Stafford Road) heading into the town center of Wales. Route 19 is a two-lane road with an average daily traffic of 3,800.

== History ==

Route 19 was originally part of New England Interstate Route 32, a multi-state route established in 1922 that ran from the mouth of the Thames River at Long Island Sound to Lake Sunapee in New Hampshire. In the 1932 state highway renumbering, modern Route 32 was established from most of the Connecticut portion of the old New England route. One place where the alignment of modern Route 32 differed was in the town of Stafford. The newly established Route 32 used the alignment of old State Highway 334, which ran through the village of Orcuttsville towards Monson, Massachusetts. The section of old Route 32 through Staffordville was designated as Route 19. The number change was done in cooperation with Massachusetts, which also renumbered the continuation as Route 19.

== Junction list ==
The entire route is in Stafford, Tolland County.

mi	km	Destinations	Notes
0.00	0.00	Route 190 – Union, Somers	Southern terminus
2.11	3.40	Route 319 west – West Stafford	Eastern terminus of Route 319
6.99	11.25	Route 19 north – Wales, Brimfield	Continuation into Massachusetts
1.000 mi = 1.609 km; 1.000 km = 0.621 mi
