= Connecticut Route 190 =

Highway in Connecticut

Route 190

Route information
- Maintained by CTDOT
- Length: 28.27 mi (45.50 km)
- Existed: 1932–present

Major junctions
- West end: Route 75 in Suffield
- US 5 in Enfield; I-91 in Enfield; Route 83 in Somers; Route 32 in Stafford; I-84 in Union
- East end: Route 171 in Union

Location
- Country: United States
- State: Connecticut
- Counties: Hartford, Tolland

Highway system
- Connecticut State Highway System; Interstate; US; State; SSR; SR; Scenic
← Route 189	→ Route 191

Route 190 is a state route in the northern part of the U.S. state of Connecticut. It starts at Route 75 in the town of Suffield and proceeds eastward across the Connecticut River through the towns of Enfield, Somers, and Stafford. It ends at Route 171, in the town of Union. Route 190 was established in 1932 as a route between the state line at Southwick and the town of Enfield. The route was later extended eastward to Union but was truncated in the west to Suffield center.

== Route description ==
Route 190 starts at Route 75, in the town of Suffield as Mapleton Avenue. The road then bears right onto Thompsonville Road to connect to Route 159 (East Street). After travelling south on Route 159 for 0.6 miles (0.97 km), it turns eastward again on Hazard Avenue, crossing the Connecticut River from Suffield into Enfield on the Enfield-Suffield Veterans Bridge. The segment of Route 190 in Suffield, from Route 75 to Route 159, is also known as the "Corporal Stephen R. Bixler Memorial Highway", named for a Suffield native who died in the Iraq War.

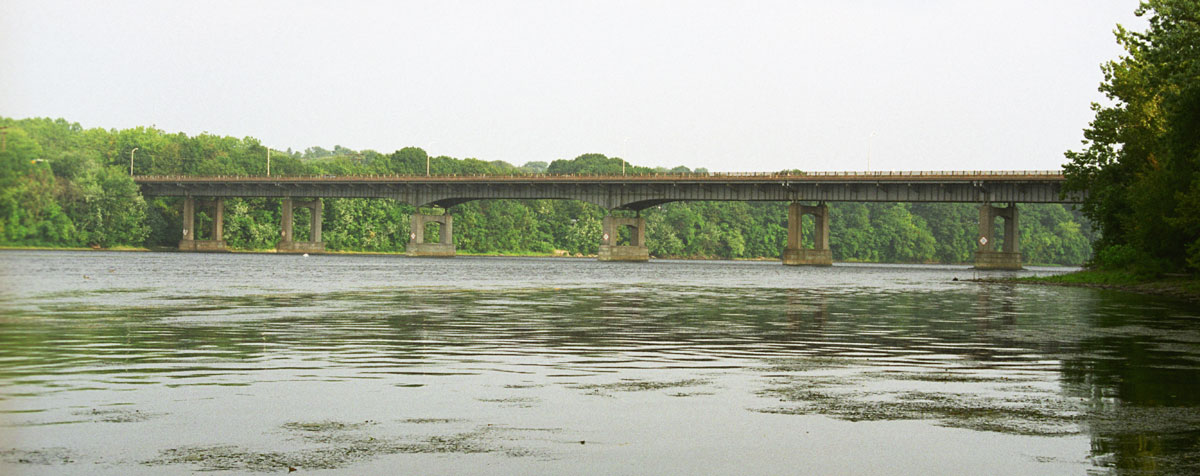
Enfield-Suffield Veterans Bridge

Hazard Avenue is a limited access road from its intersection with Route 159 to just east of the interchange with I-91. Hazard Avenue has an interchange with US 5 just after the Connecticut River crossing, where access to Route 190 is via Frew Terrace (eastbound) and Franklin Street (westbound). Both these streets are unsigned state roads with designations State Road 515 and 514, respectively. About 0.3 miles (0.48 km) to the east is a cloverleaf interchange with I-91 (at exits 47E and 47W). East of I-91, Hazard Avenue continues as a four-lane divided surface road for another 0.6 miles (0.97 km), passing by the Brookside Plaza strip mall. Route 190 continues east for about four miles (6 km) through the Hazardville and Scitico sections of Enfield, where it intersects with Routes 192 and 191 along the way. In Scitico, Route 190 passes by another strip mall, the Scitico Shopping Center as it heads east into the town of Somers.

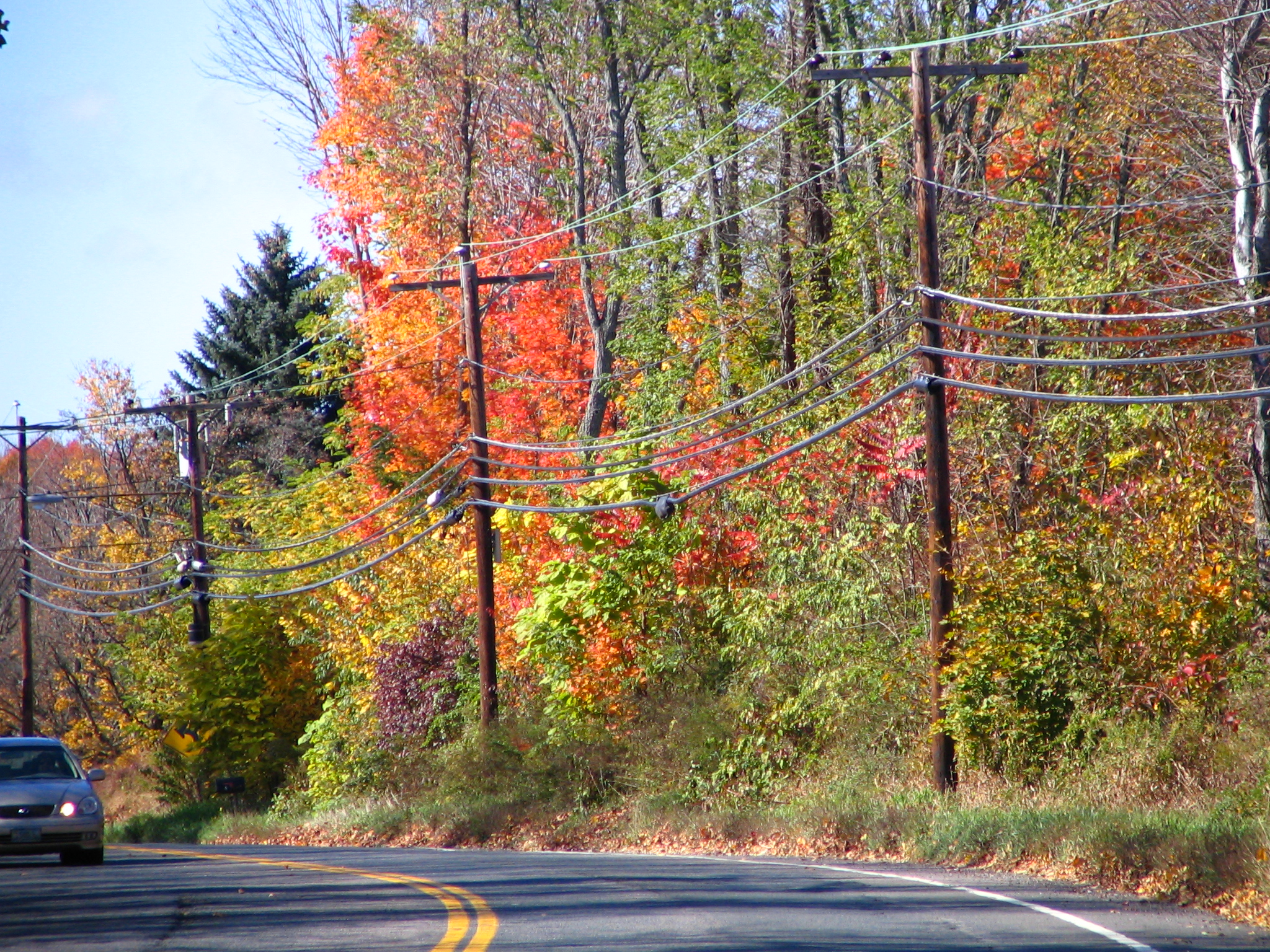
Route 190 in Somers

On entering Somers, the road becomes known as Main Street as it goes through the Somersville section of town, where it intersects with Route 186. After crossing the Scantic River, Route 190 reaches the town center of Somers, where it meets with Route 83, the main north–south route of the town. Route 190 soon enters the town of Stafford, where the road changes name to Chestnut Mountain Road. Several miles later, it intersects with Route 30 in the West Stafford section of town, where the road name changes to West Stafford Road. About a mile east of West Stafford, the road splits into two: Route 319 heads in a northeasterly direction heading towards the Stafford town center, while Route 190 heads in a southeasterly direction towards the Stafford Springs section of town. On the way to Stafford Springs, Route 190 becomes concurrent with Route 32 as it runs along West Main Street and Main Street. In the center of Stafford Springs, Route 32 splits off to the south while Route 190 continues east as East Main Street. It soon intersects with Route 19, at which point Route 190 becomes known as Buckley Highway. The route then enters the town of Union, where it has junctions with Route 89 at its northern terminus and with I-84 about a mile after that (at Exit 93). Route 190 reaches its eastern end at Route 171 in the town center of Union about 2 miles (3.2 km) east of the I-84 interchange.

== History ==
A portion of modern Route 190 was chartered as a private toll road (or turnpike) in October 1808. Known as the Woodstock and Somers Turnpike, the road was laid out as a westward continuation of the Woodstock and Thompson Turnpike. It left Woodstock center as Pulpit Rock Road, then continued west along a portion of modern Route 171 to the village of West Woodstock. From there, the road went across the northern edge of the towns of Eastford and Ashford using now abandoned roads through several reservoirs in the area. The alignment picks up again in northern Ashford town as Hillside Road, which leads to modern Route 190 in the southwest corner of Union. The turnpike then follows mostly along modern Route 190 west to Somers. By 1832, the turnpike company charter was revoked and the road was turned over to the towns it passed through.

In 1922, when state highways were first signed with route numbers in Connecticut, the road connecting the towns of Suffield and the Thompsonville section of Enfield was designated as State Highway 303. The road used Thompsonville Road in Suffield, then crossed over the now demolished Thompsonville Bridge to reach Main Street in Thompsonville. The Thompsonville Bridge was built in 1892. Modern Route 190 was designated as State Highway 105 in areas east of US 5, including the section of the old Woodstock and Somers Turnpike between Somers and Stafford Springs, which ran from Thompsonville to Stafford Springs via the center of Somers. East of Stafford Springs, modern Route 190 was designated as State Highway 149, which ran from Stafford Springs to the Massachusetts state line via the town center of Union (along a portion of modern Route 171).

In the 1932 state highway renumbering, modern Route 190 was created. The new Route 190 incorporated old State Highway 303, with a westward extension via the village of West Suffield to the Southwick Jog in Southwick, Massachusetts. The original Route 190 used modern Route 168 to reach Route 75; then after a brief overlap with Route 75, it used modern Route 190 to reach the west bank of the Connecticut River. Old State Highway 105 was designated as part of Route 20, and the Buckley Highway (old State Highway 149) became part of Route 15 in 1932. By 1947, Route 15 was relocated to the new Wilbur Cross Highway, an undivided four-lane highway. The Buckley Highway in Union became a town road. In 1961, the Bradley Airport Connector opened and Route 20 was relocated to use the new road. Route 20 was truncated to end at Exit 40 of I-91, where it ends today. The portion of Route 20 east of the Connecticut River was re-designated as an extension of Route 190, which now ended at the Wilbur Cross Highway (now I-84) in Union. As a result of the Route Reclassification Act of 1963, the Buckley Highway became a state-maintained road and was assigned as part of Route 190.

Route 190 was relocated to a new bridge over the Connecticut River in January 1967, called the Enfield-Suffield Veterans Bridge. This bridge was a replacement for the aging Thompsonville bridge which was deemed unsafe. The approaches to the old Thompsonville Bridge initially became unsigned state roads, but were later turned over to the towns after the old bridge was demolished in 1971. Not too long after the relocation, a freeway connection to Interstate 91 (I-91) was constructed as part of a grander plan for expressways in the Greater Hartford area. In 1973, I-190 was officially designated by the Federal Highway Administration in Worcester, Massachusetts. Because Route 190 extended into Massachusetts, this created a numbering conflict. In 1975, the portion of Route 190 west of Route 75 was changed in both states to Route 168. I-190 opened to traffic in 1983.

=== Expressway plans ===
In November 1958, the state of Connecticut developed a plan to replace the aging Thompsonville Bridge and relocate Route 190 to the replacement bridge. There was some opposition to the plan, though other Suffield residents and officials saw the value of reducing traffic along Thompsonville Road. In July 1962, the plan was modified to build an expressway from Route 75 in Suffield to I-91 in Enfield. Route 190 was to be relocated to a more southerly alignment by crossing under Route 159 at Canal Road. A cloverleaf would be built on the west side of Route 159. Funds for this project were appropriated in 1961 for the future extension of Route 190 to Bridge Street. The projected cost had risen from the original $6.5 million. To keep within that budget, the state planned to work east of Route 159 only, including the bridge and the I-91 interchange. On January 6, 1967, the new bridge and Route 190 expressway opened; the old Thompsonville Bridge was closed.

== Junction list ==
County	Location	mi	km	Destinations	Notes
Hartford	Suffield	0.00	0.00	Route 75 – Windsor Locks, Agawam, MA	Western terminus
Hartford	Suffield	1.69	2.72	Route 159 north – Agawam, MA	Western end of Route 159 concurrency
Hartford	Suffield	2.30	3.70	Route 159 south – Windsor Locks	Eastern end of Route 159 concurrency
Hartford	Suffield	2.30	3.70	Western end of freeway section	
Hartford	Connecticut River	2.71– 2.97	4.36– 4.78	Enfield–Suffield Veterans Bridge	
Hartford	Enfield	3.0	4.8	To US 5 – East Windsor, Thompsonville	Eastbound exit and westbound entrance; access via SR 515
Hartford	Enfield	3.33	5.36	US 5 – East Windsor, Thompsonville	Westbound exit and eastbound entrance
Hartford	Enfield	3.64	5.86	I-91 – Hartford, Springfield	Exits 55A and 55B on I-91
Hartford	Enfield	3.85	6.20	Eastern end of freeway section	
Hartford	Enfield	6.15	9.90	Route 192 north – Longmeadow, MA	Southern terminus of Route 192
Hartford	Enfield	7.37	11.86	Route 191 south – Melrose, Broad Brook	Northern terminus of Route 191
Tolland	Somers	9.05	14.56	Route 186 north – East Longmeadow, MA	Southern terminus of Route 186
Tolland	Somers	10.99	17.69	Route 83 – East Longmeadow, MA, Ellington	
Tolland	Stafford	15.77	25.38	Route 30 south – Tolland	Northern terminus of Route 30
Tolland	Stafford	16.92	27.23	Route 319 east – Stafford Hollow	Western terminus of Route 319
Tolland	Stafford	18.25	29.37	Route 32 north – Monson, MA	Western end of Route 32 concurrency
Tolland	Stafford	18.48	29.74	Route 140 west – Ellington	Eastern terminus of Route 140
Tolland	Stafford	19.28	31.03	Route 32 south – Willington	Eastern end of Route 32 concurrency
Tolland	Stafford	19.62	31.58	Route 19 north – Wales, MA	Southern terminus of Route 19
Tolland	Union	25.12	40.43	Route 89 south – Westford, Warrenville	Northern terminus of Route 89
Tolland	Union	26.30	42.33	I-84 – Hartford, Boston	Exit 93 on I-84; former I-86
Tolland	Union	28.27	45.50	Route 171 – Mashapaug, Woodstock	Eastern terminus
1.000 mi = 1.609 km; 1.000 km = 0.621 mi: Concurrency terminus
