= Connecticut Route 32 =

North-south state highway in Connecticut, US

Route 32
- Map of eastern Connecticut with Route 32 highlighted in red

Route information
- Maintained by CTDOT
- Length: 54.88 mi (88.32 km)
- Existed: 1922 (realigned 1932)–present

Major junctions
- South end: I-95 / US 1 / Eugene O'Neill Drive in New London
- I-395 / Route 2A in Norwich; Route 66 in Willimantic; US 6 in Windham; US 44 in Mansfield; I-84 in Willington; Route 190 in Stafford
- North end: Route 32 at the Massachusetts state line near Stafford

Location
- Country: United States
- State: Connecticut
- Counties: New London, Windham, Tolland

Highway system
- Connecticut State Highway System; Interstate; US; State; SSR; SR; Scenic
← Route 31	→ Route 33

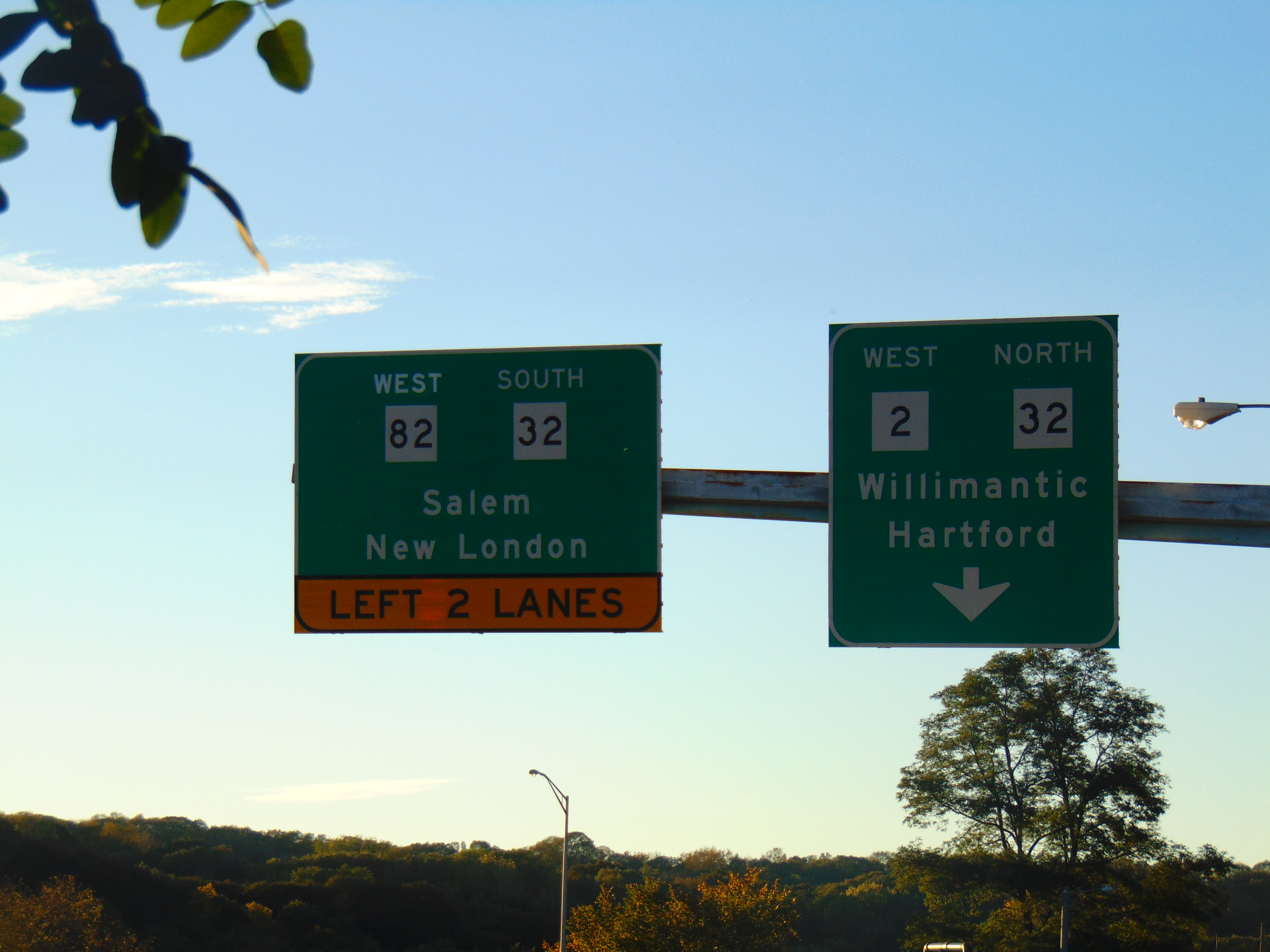
Route 32 at Route 82 and Route 2 in Norwich.

Route 32 is a 54.88-mile (88.32 km) primary north–south state highway in the U.S. state of Connecticut, beginning in New London and continuing via Willimantic to the Massachusetts state line, where it continues as Massachusetts Route 32.

== Route description ==
Route 32 begins near Interstate 95 (about 0.5-mile (0.80 km) south of the road crossing as a continuation of Water Street). It is a freeway near the interchange with I-95, then becomes a four-lane arterial road up to SR 693, a short freeway that provides access to I-395. It then becomes a mostly two-lane surface road with the exception of the overlap with Route 2 in Norwich.

It goes through the following towns: New London, Waterford, Montville, Norwich, Franklin, Lebanon (0.11 miles (0.18 km) only), Windham, Mansfield, Willington, Tolland (0.10 miles (0.16 km) only), Ellington, and Stafford. From New London to Norwich, Route 32 follows along the west bank of the Thames River.

== History ==
Route 32 between Norwich and New London was laid out in 1670 and remained little more than an Indian trail for more than a century. The number dates from when the route was part of New England Interstate Route 32 from 1922–1932. In 1932, Connecticut stopped using the New England route system, but Route 32 kept its number as a state highway. The north and south ends were also realigned in 1932. In the south, the original New England Route 32 ran along present day Route 12 from Groton to Norwich. The modern alignment from New London to Norwich used to be part of New England Route 12. (Route 12 and Route 32 have basically swapped places south of Norwich). In the north, the original New England Route 32 used present day Route 19 from Stafford to the Massachusetts state line. The modern alignment in Stafford was known as State Highway 334 in the 1920s before being reassigned to Route 32.

== Major intersections ==
County	Location	mi	km	Destinations	Notes
New London	New London	0.00	0.00	Eugene O'Neill Drive	Continuation south
New London	New London	0.14– 0.94	0.23– 1.51	I-95 / US 1 – Groton, Providence, New Haven	Exits 93 and 93B on I-95
New London	Waterford			Northern end of limited-access section	
New London	Waterford	4.04	6.50	To I-395 north – Norwich	Interchange; northbound exit and southbound entrance; access via SR 693
New London	Montville	5.58	8.98	Route 163 north – Oakdale	Southern terminus of Route 163
New London	Montville	8.93	14.37	Route 2A – Norwich, Poquetanuck	Exit 5 on Route 2A
New London	Norwich	12.15	19.55	Route 82 west – Montville	Eastern terminus of Route 82
New London	Norwich	12.33	19.84	Route 2 east – Norwich	Southern end of Route 2 concurrency
New London	Norwich	13.70	22.05	Route 169 north – Taftville	Southern terminus of Route 169
New London	Norwich	14.85	23.90	I-395 / Route 2A east – New Haven, Worcester	No northbound access to I-395 north; western terminus of Route 2A; exits 13A and 13B on I-395; former Route 52
New London	Norwich	16.21	26.09	Route 2 west – Hartford	Northern end of Route 2 concurrency
New London	Franklin	17.05	27.44	Route 87 north – Lebanon	Southern terminus of Route 87
New London	Franklin	18.59	29.92	Plain Hill Road (SR 610 north)	
New London	Franklin	22.16	35.66	Route 207 – Baltic, Lebanon	
Windham	Windham	25.46	40.97	Route 203 north – Windham	Southern terminus of Route 203
Windham	Windham	28.50	45.87	South Street (SR 661)	
Windham	Windham	29.00	46.67	Route 289 south – Lebanon	Northern terminus of Route 289
Windham	Windham	29.23	47.04	Air Line State Park Trail – Lebanon, Colchester	
Windham	Windham	29.27	47.11	Route 66 east – North Windham	Southern end of Route 66 concurrency
Windham	Windham	30.02	48.31	Route 66 west – Columbia	Northern end of Route 66 concurrency
Windham	Windham	30.89	49.71	US 6 – Columbia, North Windham	
Tolland	Mansfield	32.29	51.97	Route 31 north – Coventry	Southern terminus of Route 31
Tolland	Mansfield	35.62	57.32	Route 275 – Coventry, Storrs	
Tolland	Mansfield	37.50	60.35	US 44 – Ashford, Bolton	
Tolland	Mansfield	39.79	64.04	Route 195 – Tolland, Storrs	
Tolland	Willington	43.16	69.46	Route 74 – Tolland, Willington	
Tolland	Willington	44.64	71.84	I-84 – Boston, Hartford	Exit 85 on I-84; former I-86
Tolland	Stafford	48.85	78.62	Route 190 east – Union	Southern end of Route 190 concurrency
Tolland	Stafford	49.08	78.99	Route 140 west – Ellington	Eastern terminus of Route 140
Tolland	Stafford	49.88	80.27	Route 190 west – Somers	Northern end of Route 190 concurrency
Tolland	Stafford	50.78	81.72	Route 319 – Stafford, West Stafford	
Tolland	Stafford	54.88	88.32	Route 32 north – Monson, Palmer	Continuation into Massachusetts
1.000 mi = 1.609 km; 1.000 km = 0.621 mi: Concurrency terminus

== See also ==
- New England Interstate Route 32
