= Connecticut's 52nd House of Representatives district =

American legislative district

Connecticut's 52nd State House of Representatives district
Representative
Kurt Vail; R

Connecticut's 52nd House of Representatives district elects one member of the Connecticut House of Representatives. Its current representative is Republican Kurt Vail. The district consists of the towns of Stafford and Somers, which was fully added to the district in 2011.

== List of representatives ==
Representative	Party	Years	District home	Note
William A. O'Neill	Democratic	1967 – 1973	East Hampton	Redistricted to the 34th District
Peter F. Locke, Jr.	Republican	1973 – 1975	Stafford Springs	Redistricted from the 49th District
John E. Julian	Democratic	1975 – 1979	Stafford Springs	
John Mordasky	Democratic	1979 – 1981	Stafford	Lost reelection
Albert Tucker Dolge	Republican	1981 – 1983	Stafford Springs	Lost reelection
John Mordasky	Democratic	1983 – 2003	Stafford	Lost reelection
Penny Bacchiochi	Republican	2003 – 2015	Stafford	Did not seek reelection
Kurt Vail	Republican	2015 – present	Stafford	Incumbent

== Recent elections ==
State Election 2024 candidates: House District 52
Party	Candidate	Votes	%	±%
Republican	Kurt Vail	8,421	57.6	
Democratic	Ethan R. Werstler	6,202	42.4	
Majority		2,219		
Turnout		14,623		
Republican hold		Swing		

State Election 2022 candidates: House District 52
Party	Candidate	Votes	%	±%
Republican	Kurt Vail	6,885	63.5	
Democratic	Gregg Dafoe	3,961	36.5	
Majority		1,037		
Turnout		10,846		
Republican hold		Swing		

State Election 2020 candidates: House District 52
Party	Candidate	Votes	%	±%
Republican	Kurt Vail	7,606	64.6	
Democratic	Greg Post	4,171	35.4	
Majority		3,435		
Turnout		11,777		
Republican hold		Swing		

State Election 2018 candidates: House District 52
Party	Candidate	Votes	%	±%
Republican	Kurt Vail	5,681	60.6	
Democratic	David F. Walsh	3,520	37.6	
Independent	Linda Louise LaCasse	166	1.8	
Majority		1,995		
Turnout		9,367		
Republican hold		Swing		

State Election 2016 candidates: House District 52
Party	Candidate	Votes	%	±%
Republican	Kurt Vail	6,657	58.3	
Democratic	Kathy Bachiochi	4,180	36.6	
Independent	Linda Louise LaCasse	587	5.1	
Majority		1,890		
Turnout		11,424		
Republican hold		Swing		

State Election 2014 candidates: House District 52
Party	Candidate	Votes	%	±%
Republican	Kurt Vail	4,532	57.3	
Democratic	David Pinney	2,999	37.9	
Independent	Linda Louise LaCasse	373	4.7	
Majority		1,533	19.4	−17.1
Turnout		7,904		
Republican hold		Swing	-10.5	

State Election 2012 candidates: House District 52
Party	Candidate	Votes	%	±%
Republican	Penny Bacchiochi	6,872	67.8	
Democratic	Chris Grohs	3,171	31.3	
Independent	Daniel Traceski	93	0.9	
Majority		3,701	36.5	−63.5
Turnout		10,136		
Republican hold		Swing		
