= Penny Bacchiochi =

American Republican politician

Member of the Connecticut House of Representatives from the 52nd district
- In office January 8, 2003 – January 7, 2015
- Preceded by: John Mordasky
- Succeeded by: Kurt Vail

Personal details
- Party: Republican
- Spouse: Emil Igwenagu
- Children: Two sons

Penny Bacchiochi (born c. 1961) is an American Republican politician, who served as a state representative in Connecticut. She was first elected to the House in 2002 and was re-elected in 2004 and 2006. She unsuccessfully sought the office of Lieutenant Governor in the 2014 election.

As representative of the 52nd House District, Bacchiochi served the rural northeastern towns of Stafford and Somers, both of which are located in Tolland County. She maintains her residence in Stafford Springs.

== Personal background ==
Raised in Stafford, Bacchiochi graduated from Stafford High School in 1979 and later received degrees from Becker Junior College, where she majored in social work, and the University of Connecticut, where she majored in public relations and marketing. She also completed some graduate-level work in education at Saint Joseph College.

Aside from being a state representative, Bacchiochi has worked in the housing field for more than 25 years. She owns a real estate and property management company based in Stafford.

Before becoming a state legislator, Bacchiochi served on several town committees in Stafford, including the Planning and Zoning Committee. She was also active with the Republican Town Committees in Stafford and Somers, including serving as chair of the Somers RTC.

A widow, who has since remarried, Bacchiochi was a single mother to two young sons. She is also the daughter of Allen Bacchiochi, former first selectman of Stafford.

== Role at legislature ==
Bacchiochi was the House's ranking member, or leader of the Republican delegation, on the Connecticut General Assembly's Planning and Development Committee. She was also the ranking member of the Internship Committee, which she previously chaired, and oversaw the Connecticut Legislative Internship Program for the House Republican Office. In addition, she was a member of the Public Safety and Security Committee and participated in bill screening for the House Republicans.

She previously served on the Select Committee for Housing and the Commerce Committee.

== Political stances ==
Bacchiochi is a fiscal conservative and has offered a viable "No Tax Increase Budget" each year since 2007. Regarding other conservative stances, Bacchiochi is a member of the National Rifle Association, and voted against the state contracting reform legislation put forth by Democrats. She continues to support a no-tax-increase state budget plans and has cosponsored legislation to make English the official language of Connecticut.

Bacchiochi is active with the American Legislative Exchange Council (ALEC), Council of State Governments, Women in Government, and the National Conference of State Legislatures, and served as the Connecticut State Co-Chair of the Rudy Giuliani Presidential Committee.

== See also ==
- Connecticut House of Representatives
- Connecticut General Assembly
