= Massachusetts Route 19 =

North-south state highway in Massachusetts, US

Route 19
- Route 19 highlighted in red

Route information
- Maintained by MassDOT
- Length: 16.54 mi (26.62 km)
- Existed: ca. 1932–present

Major junctions
- South end: Route 19 at the Connecticut state line near Wales
- US 20 in Brimfield; Route 67 in Warren
- North end: Route 9 / Route 67 in West Brookfield

Location
- Country: United States
- State: Massachusetts
- Counties: Hampden, Worcester

Highway system
- Massachusetts State Highway System; Interstate; US; State
← Route 18	→ US 20

Route 19 is a 16.54-mile-long (26.62 km) north–south state highway located in south central Massachusetts, United States. It runs from the Connecticut border in Wales north to an intersection with Massachusetts Route 9 and Massachusetts Route 67 in the town of West Brookfield.

The highway continues south of the state border as Connecticut Route 19.

== Route description ==
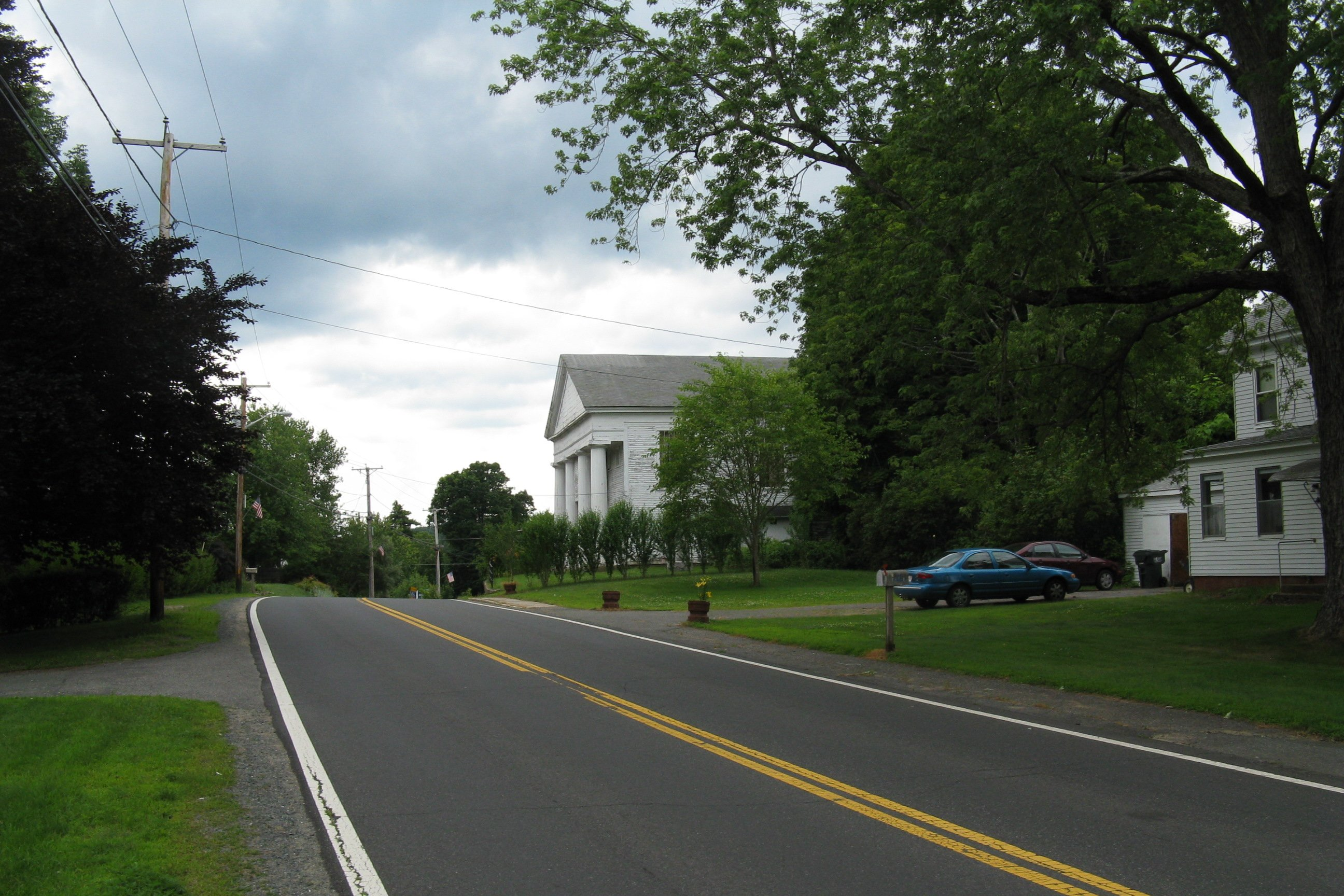
Southbound in Wales at Old Wales Town Hall

Route 19 in Massachusetts begins when Route 19 in Connecticut crosses from Stafford, Connecticut, into Wales, Massachusetts. The highway meanders through the town and continues north into Brimfield, where it crosses U.S. Route 20 in the center of town. Route 19 continues north out of the town and heads due north, eventually crossing into the town of Warren in Worcester County. Just after crossing into Warren, Route 19 passes underneath the Massachusetts Turnpike (I-90) without an interchange. (The nearest interchanges are at Exit 8 in Palmer and Exit 9 in Sturbridge, both accessible from US-20.) Route 19 heads into the center of town where it meets Route 67. Route 19 joins Route 67 northbound, and the two routes run concurrently northeast until crossing into West Brookfield, where they intersect with Route 9. Route 19 ends here, with Route 67 turning to join Route 9 eastbound.

== History ==
From Brimfield south to the Connecticut state line, Route 19 was part of New England Interstate Route 32.

== Major intersections ==
County	Location	mi	km	Destinations	Notes
Hampden	Wales	0.00	0.00	Route 19 south – Stafford	Continuation into Connecticut
Hampden	Brimfield	7.20	11.59	US 20 – Sturbridge, Southbridge, Palmer	
Worcester	Warren	14.00	22.53	Route 67 south – Palmer	Southern end of Route 67 concurrency
Worcester	West Brookfield	16.54	26.62	Route 9 / Route 67 north – Ware, Amherst, Worcester	Northern terminus; northern end of Route 67 concurrency
1.000 mi = 1.609 km; 1.000 km = 0.621 mi: Concurrency terminus
