= Hydeville =

Hydeville may refer to the following populated places:

- Hydeville, Connecticut
- Hydeville, Vermont

== See also ==
- Hydesville, California
