= 1916 United States presidential election in Connecticut =

- November 7, 1916
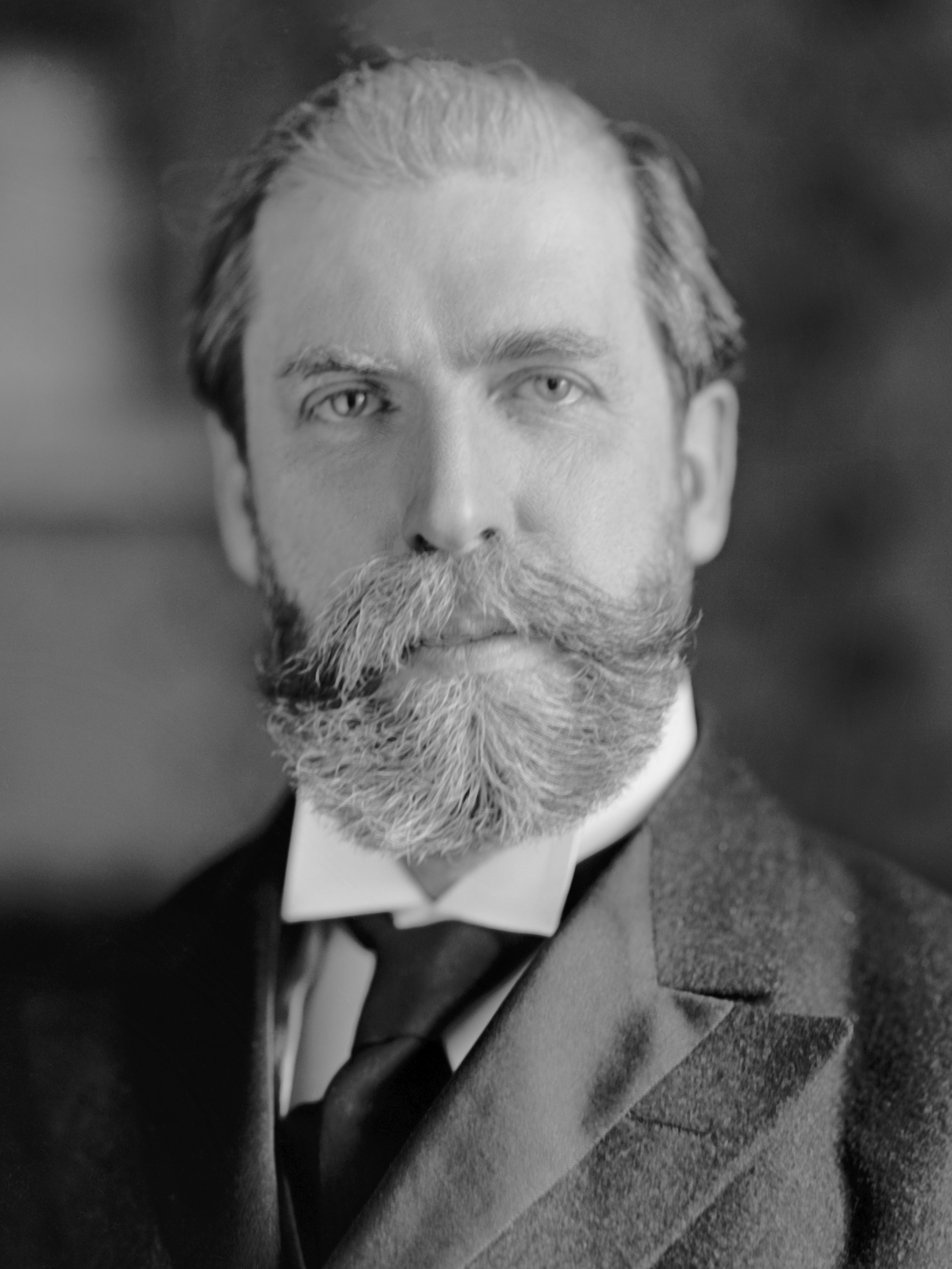

Nominee	Charles Evans Hughes	Woodrow Wilson
Party	Republican	Democratic
Home state	New York	New Jersey
Running mate	Charles W. Fairbanks	Thomas R. Marshall
Electoral vote	7	0
Popular vote	106,514	99,786
Percentage	49.80%	46.66%

Hughes
40–50%
50–60%
60–70%
70–80%
Wilson
40–50%
50–60%
60–70%
President before election
Woodrow Wilson
Democratic
Elected President
Woodrow Wilson
Democratic

The 1916 United States presidential election in Connecticut took place on November 7, 1916, as part of the 1916 United States presidential election which was held throughout all contemporary 48 states. Voters chose seven representatives, or electors to the Electoral College, who voted for president and vice president.

Connecticut was won by the Republican nominee, U.S. Supreme Court Justice Charles Evans Hughes of New York, and his running mate Senator Charles W. Fairbanks of Indiana. They defeated Democratic nominees, incumbent Democratic President Woodrow Wilson and Vice President Thomas R. Marshall.

Hughes won Connecticut by a narrow margin of 3.14%. A Democrat would not win without Windham County until Joe Biden did so in 2020.

== Results ==
1916 United States presidential election in Connecticut
Party	Candidate	Running mate	Popular vote		Electoral vote	
Party	Candidate	Running mate	Count	%	Count	%
Republican	Charles Evans Hughes of New York	Charles Warren Fairbanks of Indiana	106,514	49.80%	7	100.00%
Democratic	Woodrow Wilson of New Jersey	Thomas Riley Marshall of Indiana	99,786	46.66%	0	0.00%
Socialist	Allan Louis Benson of New York	George Ross Kirkpatrick of New Jersey	5,179	2.42%	0	0.00%
Prohibition	James Franklin Hanly of Indiana	Ira Landrith of Tennessee	1,789	0.84%	0	0.00%
Socialist Labor	Arthur Elmer Reimer of Massachusetts	Caleb Harrison of Illinois	606	0.28%	0	0.00%
Total			213,874	100.00%	7	100.00%

=== Results by town ===
Town	Charles Evans Hughes Republican		Thomas Woodrow Wilson Democratic		Allan Louis Benson Socialist		James Franklin Hanly Prohibition		Arthur Elmer Reimer Socialist Labor		Margin		Total votes cast
Town	#	%	#	%	#	%	#	%	#	%	#	%	Total votes cast
Andover	44	57.14%	30	38.96%	0	0.00%	3	3.90%	0	0.00%	14	18.18%	77
Ansonia	1,269	47.03%	1,315	48.74%	93	3.45%	13	0.48%	8	0.30%	-46	-1.70%	2,698
Ashford	56	44.44%	66	52.38%	1	0.79%	3	2.38%	0	0.00%	-10	-7.94%	126
Avon	159	60.00%	100	37.74%	4	1.51%	2	0.75%	0	0.00%	59	22.26%	265
Barkhamsted	101	55.80%	79	43.65%	1	0.55%	0	0.00%	0	0.00%	22	12.15%	181
Beacon Falls	89	61.81%	48	33.33%	7	4.86%	0	0.00%	0	0.00%	41	28.47%	144
Berlin	355	53.79%	267	40.45%	26	3.94%	11	1.67%	1	0.15%	88	13.33%	660
Bethany	44	48.35%	45	49.45%	0	0.00%	2	2.20%	0	0.00%	-1	-1.10%	91
Bethel	400	54.95%	311	42.72%	8	1.10%	6	0.82%	3	0.41%	89	12.23%	728
Bethlehem	73	63.48%	41	35.65%	0	0.00%	1	0.87%	0	0.00%	32	27.83%	115
Bloomfield	201	47.41%	190	44.81%	7	1.65%	23	5.42%	3	0.71%	11	2.59%	424
Bolton	54	50.94%	48	45.28%	2	1.89%	2	1.89%	0	0.00%	6	5.66%	106
Bozrah	72	35.12%	127	61.95%	3	1.46%	2	0.98%	1	0.49%	-55	-26.83%	205
Branford	606	53.25%	485	42.62%	42	3.69%	4	0.35%	1	0.09%	121	10.63%	1,138
Bridgeport	10,031	51.12%	8,837	45.03%	582	2.97%	111	0.57%	63	0.32%	1,194	6.08%	19,624
Bridgewater	40	36.04%	69	62.16%	0	0.00%	2	1.80%	0	0.00%	-29	-26.13%	111
Bristol	1,245	47.00%	1,318	49.75%	42	1.59%	44	1.66%	0	0.00%	-73	-2.76%	2,649
Brookfield	99	52.66%	85	45.21%	1	0.53%	2	1.06%	1	0.53%	14	7.45%	188
Brooklyn	152	48.56%	157	50.16%	3	0.96%	1	0.32%	0	0.00%	-5	-1.60%	313
Burlington	93	54.39%	76	44.44%	1	0.58%	1	0.58%	0	0.00%	17	9.94%	171
Canaan	84	55.63%	63	41.72%	0	0.00%	4	2.65%	0	0.00%	21	13.91%	151
Canterbury	111	58.12%	74	38.74%	0	0.00%	6	3.14%	0	0.00%	37	19.37%	191
Canton	356	58.94%	246	40.73%	1	0.17%	1	0.17%	0	0.00%	110	18.21%	604
Chaplin	46	66.67%	20	28.99%	3	4.35%	0	0.00%	0	0.00%	26	37.68%	69
Cheshire	280	63.35%	156	35.29%	1	0.23%	5	1.13%	0	0.00%	124	28.05%	442
Chester	190	61.49%	112	36.25%	5	1.62%	2	0.65%	0	0.00%	78	25.24%	309
Clinton	180	62.50%	101	35.07%	1	0.35%	5	1.74%	1	0.35%	79	27.43%	288
Colchester	234	60.94%	146	38.02%	2	0.52%	2	0.52%	0	0.00%	88	22.92%	384
Colebrook	67	58.26%	47	40.87%	0	0.00%	1	0.87%	0	0.00%	20	17.39%	115
Columbia	86	60.99%	53	37.59%	2	1.42%	0	0.00%	0	0.00%	33	23.40%	141
Cornwall	95	39.26%	142	58.68%	0	0.00%	5	2.07%	0	0.00%	-47	-19.42%	242
Coventry	199	55.74%	153	42.86%	4	1.12%	1	0.28%	0	0.00%	46	12.89%	357
Cromwell	240	64.00%	129	34.40%	5	1.33%	1	0.27%	0	0.00%	111	29.60%	375
Danbury	2,224	47.44%	2,302	49.10%	117	2.50%	31	0.66%	14	0.30%	-78	-1.66%	4,688
Darien	453	63.62%	250	35.11%	7	0.98%	2	0.28%	0	0.00%	203	28.51%	712
Derby	654	40.30%	908	55.95%	57	3.51%	0	0.00%	4	0.25%	-254	-15.65%	1,623
Durham	117	49.16%	120	50.42%	0	0.00%	1	0.42%	0	0.00%	-3	-1.26%	238
East Granby	125	59.24%	84	39.81%	1	0.47%	1	0.47%	0	0.00%	41	19.43%	211
East Haddam	232	63.74%	125	34.34%	1	0.27%	5	1.37%	1	0.27%	107	29.40%	364
East Hampton	278	45.57%	293	48.03%	21	3.44%	16	2.62%	2	0.33%	-15	-2.46%	610
East Hartford	838	40.60%	1,142	55.33%	50	2.42%	23	1.11%	11	0.53%	-304	-14.73%	2,064
East Haven	273	57.35%	182	38.24%	16	3.36%	3	0.63%	2	0.42%	91	19.12%	476
East Lyme	228	54.42%	182	43.44%	1	0.24%	7	1.67%	1	0.24%	46	10.98%	419
East Windsor	403	60.06%	237	35.32%	25	3.73%	5	0.75%	1	0.15%	166	24.74%	671
Eastford	60	56.60%	45	42.45%	0	0.00%	1	0.94%	0	0.00%	15	14.15%	106
Easton	99	50.00%	98	49.49%	1	0.51%	0	0.00%	0	0.00%	1	0.51%	198
Ellington	210	48.95%	198	46.15%	15	3.50%	4	0.93%	2	0.47%	12	2.80%	429
Enfield	936	56.45%	693	41.80%	7	0.42%	19	1.15%	3	0.18%	243	14.66%	1,658
Essex	371	57.43%	264	40.87%	4	0.62%	7	1.08%	0	0.00%	107	16.56%	646
Fairfield	633	55.19%	482	42.02%	13	1.13%	16	1.39%	3	0.26%	151	13.16%	1,147
Farmington	383	50.80%	358	47.48%	6	0.80%	6	0.80%	1	0.13%	25	3.32%	754
Franklin	77	70.00%	31	28.18%	0	0.00%	2	1.82%	0	0.00%	46	41.82%	110
Glastonbury	429	47.61%	454	50.39%	11	1.22%	6	0.67%	1	0.11%	-25	-2.77%	901
Goshen	90	61.22%	55	37.41%	0	0.00%	2	1.36%	0	0.00%	35	23.81%	147
Granby	162	58.48%	105	37.91%	1	0.36%	9	3.25%	0	0.00%	57	20.58%	277
Greenwich	1,815	60.56%	1,130	37.70%	41	1.37%	6	0.20%	5	0.17%	685	22.86%	2,997
Griswold	304	45.65%	357	53.60%	4	0.60%	1	0.15%	0	0.00%	-53	-7.96%	666
Groton	645	46.37%	692	49.75%	22	1.58%	31	2.23%	1	0.07%	-47	-3.38%	1,391
Guilford	370	57.19%	234	36.17%	2	0.31%	39	6.03%	2	0.31%	136	21.02%	647
Haddam	229	53.26%	195	45.35%	2	0.47%	4	0.93%	0	0.00%	34	7.91%	430
Hamden	682	55.13%	495	40.02%	36	2.91%	9	0.73%	15	1.21%	187	15.12%	1,237
Hampton	95	67.86%	43	30.71%	1	0.71%	1	0.71%	0	0.00%	52	37.14%	140
Hartford	8,375	40.61%	11,357	55.07%	602	2.92%	215	1.04%	74	0.36%	-2,982	-14.46%	20,623
Hartland	59	59.00%	38	38.00%	1	1.00%	2	2.00%	0	0.00%	21	21.00%	100
Harwinton	126	68.48%	55	29.89%	2	1.09%	1	0.54%	0	0.00%	71	38.59%	184
Hebron	102	63.75%	56	35.00%	2	1.25%	0	0.00%	0	0.00%	46	28.75%	160
Huntington	729	55.44%	512	38.94%	58	4.41%	12	0.91%	4	0.30%	217	16.50%	1,315
Kent	133	55.88%	105	44.12%	0	0.00%	0	0.00%	0	0.00%	28	11.76%	238
Killingly	705	54.57%	565	43.73%	7	0.54%	15	1.16%	0	0.00%	140	10.84%	1,292
Killingworth	69	61.06%	37	32.74%	6	5.31%	1	0.88%	0	0.00%	32	28.32%	113
Lebanon	149	71.63%	54	25.96%	0	0.00%	5	2.40%	0	0.00%	95	45.67%	208
Ledyard	90	56.96%	65	41.14%	3	1.90%	0	0.00%	0	0.00%	25	15.82%	158
Lisbon	92	58.97%	53	33.97%	9	5.77%	0	0.00%	2	1.28%	39	25.00%	156
Litchfield	346	47.79%	366	50.55%	3	0.41%	7	0.97%	2	0.28%	-20	-2.76%	724
Lyme	84	52.83%	67	42.14%	3	1.89%	5	3.14%	0	0.00%	17	10.69%	159
Madison	272	73.51%	88	23.78%	2	0.54%	7	1.89%	1	0.27%	184	49.73%	370
Manchester	1,224	48.53%	1,040	41.24%	115	4.56%	117	4.64%	26	1.03%	184	7.30%	2,522
Mansfield	245	63.14%	132	34.02%	2	0.52%	9	2.32%	0	0.00%	113	29.12%	388
Marlborough	45	58.44%	31	40.26%	1	1.30%	0	0.00%	0	0.00%	14	18.18%	77
Meriden	3,368	49.34%	3,239	47.45%	145	2.12%	51	0.75%	23	0.34%	129	1.89%	6,826
Middlebury	86	59.72%	51	35.42%	3	2.08%	4	2.78%	0	0.00%	35	24.31%	144
Middlefield	117	73.13%	42	26.25%	0	0.00%	1	0.63%	0	0.00%	75	46.88%	160
Middletown	1,548	48.34%	1,591	49.69%	44	1.37%	13	0.41%	6	0.19%	-43	-1.34%	3,202
Milford	885	56.69%	639	40.94%	23	1.47%	10	0.64%	4	0.26%	246	15.76%	1,561
Monroe	135	60.81%	86	38.74%	0	0.00%	0	0.00%	1	0.45%	49	22.07%	222
Montville	247	53.58%	205	44.47%	4	0.87%	3	0.65%	2	0.43%	42	9.11%	461
Morris	57	46.34%	66	53.66%	0	0.00%	0	0.00%	0	0.00%	-9	-7.32%	123
Naugatuck	861	39.97%	1,159	53.81%	121	5.62%	8	0.37%	5	0.23%	-298	-13.83%	2,154
New Britain	3,770	50.81%	3,295	44.41%	227	3.06%	96	1.29%	32	0.43%	475	6.40%	7,420
New Canaan	490	65.07%	254	33.73%	5	0.66%	3	0.40%	1	0.13%	236	31.34%	753
New Fairfield	81	62.31%	47	36.15%	2	1.54%	0	0.00%	0	0.00%	34	26.15%	130
New Hartford	231	55.66%	181	43.61%	2	0.48%	1	0.24%	0	0.00%	50	12.05%	415
New Haven	11,151	45.41%	12,195	49.66%	1,008	4.10%	116	0.47%	86	0.35%	-1,044	-4.25%	24,556
New London	1,653	42.31%	2,164	55.39%	35	0.90%	50	1.28%	5	0.13%	-511	-13.08%	3,907
New Milford	516	47.69%	541	50.00%	8	0.74%	15	1.39%	2	0.18%	-25	-2.31%	1,082
Newington	168	52.34%	139	43.30%	7	2.18%	7	2.18%	0	0.00%	29	9.03%	321
Newtown	316	45.86%	369	53.56%	2	0.29%	2	0.29%	0	0.00%	-53	-7.69%	689
Norfolk	164	45.68%	194	54.04%	1	0.28%	0	0.00%	0	0.00%	-30	-8.36%	359
North Branford	116	62.37%	70	37.63%	0	0.00%	0	0.00%	0	0.00%	46	24.73%	186
North Canaan	226	51.60%	211	48.17%	0	0.00%	0	0.00%	1	0.23%	15	3.42%	438
North Haven	299	68.58%	124	28.44%	4	0.92%	6	1.38%	3	0.69%	175	40.14%	436
North Stonington	130	49.62%	128	48.85%	2	0.76%	2	0.76%	0	0.00%	2	0.76%	262
Norwalk	2,797	59.18%	1,830	38.72%	51	1.08%	35	0.74%	13	0.28%	967	20.46%	4,726
Norwich	2,398	49.89%	2,291	47.66%	77	1.60%	27	0.56%	14	0.29%	107	2.23%	4,807
Old Lyme	144	51.80%	128	46.04%	2	0.72%	3	1.08%	1	0.36%	16	5.76%	278
Old Saybrook	181	61.15%	113	38.18%	1	0.34%	1	0.34%	0	0.00%	68	22.97%	296
Orange	1,439	51.39%	1,234	44.07%	87	3.11%	20	0.71%	20	0.71%	205	7.32%	2,800
Oxford	115	59.28%	74	38.14%	3	1.55%	2	1.03%	0	0.00%	41	21.13%	194
Plainfield	472	50.05%	454	48.14%	12	1.27%	4	0.42%	1	0.11%	18	1.91%	943
Plainville	386	54.14%	296	41.51%	21	2.95%	8	1.12%	2	0.28%	90	12.62%	713
Plymouth	342	45.66%	348	46.46%	47	6.28%	7	0.93%	5	0.67%	-6	-0.80%	749
Pomfret	204	59.13%	134	38.84%	2	0.58%	5	1.45%	0	0.00%	70	20.29%	345
Portland	421	52.17%	381	47.21%	3	0.37%	1	0.12%	1	0.12%	40	4.96%	807
Preston	165	61.34%	101	37.55%	0	0.00%	3	1.12%	0	0.00%	64	23.79%	269
Prospect	66	75.00%	19	21.59%	3	3.41%	0	0.00%	0	0.00%	47	53.41%	88
Putnam	640	51.82%	581	47.04%	9	0.73%	5	0.40%	0	0.00%	59	4.78%	1,235
Redding	186	51.38%	171	47.24%	3	0.83%	2	0.55%	0	0.00%	15	4.14%	362
Ridgefield	345	59.59%	229	39.55%	4	0.69%	1	0.17%	0	0.00%	116	20.03%	579
Rocky Hill	142	55.47%	109	42.58%	3	1.17%	2	0.78%	0	0.00%	33	12.89%	256
Roxbury	77	49.04%	79	50.32%	1	0.64%	0	0.00%	0	0.00%	-2	-1.27%	157
Salem	54	63.53%	30	35.29%	1	1.18%	0	0.00%	0	0.00%	24	28.24%	85
Salisbury	360	58.92%	249	40.75%	0	0.00%	2	0.33%	0	0.00%	111	18.17%	611
Saybrook	241	54.04%	194	43.50%	7	1.57%	4	0.90%	0	0.00%	47	10.54%	446
Scotland	68	64.76%	35	33.33%	0	0.00%	2	1.90%	0	0.00%	33	31.43%	105
Seymour	586	61.62%	336	35.33%	12	1.26%	17	1.79%	0	0.00%	250	26.29%	951
Sharon	243	62.47%	145	37.28%	0	0.00%	1	0.26%	0	0.00%	98	25.19%	389
Sherman	66	61.11%	41	37.96%	1	0.93%	0	0.00%	0	0.00%	25	23.15%	108
Simsbury	280	51.00%	256	46.63%	6	1.09%	7	1.28%	0	0.00%	24	4.37%	549
Somers	148	59.44%	97	38.96%	3	1.20%	1	0.40%	0	0.00%	51	20.48%	249
South Windsor	207	53.35%	169	43.56%	2	0.52%	10	2.58%	0	0.00%	38	9.79%	388
Southbury	146	53.68%	126	46.32%	0	0.00%	0	0.00%	0	0.00%	20	7.35%	272
Southington	691	52.55%	590	44.87%	25	1.90%	8	0.61%	1	0.08%	101	7.68%	1,315
Sprague	155	38.75%	234	58.50%	6	1.50%	3	0.75%	2	0.50%	-79	-19.75%	400
Stafford	431	50.47%	397	46.49%	17	1.99%	8	0.94%	1	0.12%	34	3.98%	854
Stamford	3,206	54.95%	2,517	43.14%	93	1.59%	8	0.14%	10	0.17%	689	11.81%	5,834
Sterling	88	36.51%	152	63.07%	1	0.41%	0	0.00%	0	0.00%	-64	-26.56%	241
Stonington	977	50.54%	855	44.23%	67	3.47%	24	1.24%	10	0.52%	122	6.31%	1,933
Stratford	813	53.98%	619	41.10%	59	3.92%	12	0.80%	3	0.20%	194	12.88%	1,506
Suffield	479	61.97%	289	37.39%	0	0.00%	4	0.52%	1	0.13%	190	24.58%	773
Thomaston	404	54.97%	314	42.72%	12	1.63%	5	0.68%	0	0.00%	90	12.24%	735
Thompson	311	55.83%	235	42.19%	5	0.90%	4	0.72%	2	0.36%	76	13.64%	557
Tolland	83	41.50%	107	53.50%	3	1.50%	3	1.50%	4	2.00%	-24	-12.00%	200
Torrington	1,741	53.70%	1,402	43.24%	67	2.07%	24	0.74%	8	0.25%	339	10.46%	3,242
Trumbull	221	53.64%	185	44.90%	4	0.97%	2	0.49%	0	0.00%	36	8.74%	412
Union	52	69.33%	23	30.67%	0	0.00%	0	0.00%	0	0.00%	29	38.67%	75
Vernon	953	52.54%	705	38.86%	130	7.17%	11	0.61%	15	0.83%	248	13.67%	1,814
Voluntown	94	62.25%	55	36.42%	2	1.32%	0	0.00%	0	0.00%	39	25.83%	151
Wallingford	1,045	47.89%	1,045	47.89%	60	2.75%	22	1.01%	10	0.46%	0	0.00%	2,182
Warren	38	44.19%	45	52.33%	1	1.16%	2	2.33%	0	0.00%	-7	-8.14%	86
Washington	231	60.31%	150	39.16%	0	0.00%	2	0.52%	0	0.00%	81	21.15%	383
Waterbury	5,298	44.86%	6,066	51.37%	373	3.16%	42	0.36%	30	0.25%	-768	-6.50%	11,809
Waterford	291	43.76%	357	53.68%	9	1.35%	7	1.05%	1	0.15%	-66	-9.92%	665
Watertown	443	64.86%	229	33.53%	8	1.17%	3	0.44%	0	0.00%	214	31.33%	683
West Hartford	752	59.78%	448	35.61%	25	1.99%	27	2.15%	6	0.48%	304	24.17%	1,258
Westbrook	110	59.78%	68	36.96%	2	1.09%	3	1.63%	1	0.54%	42	22.83%	184
Weston	104	56.52%	78	42.39%	1	0.54%	1	0.54%	0	0.00%	26	14.13%	184
Westport	504	62.30%	290	35.85%	11	1.36%	2	0.25%	2	0.25%	214	26.45%	809
Wethersfield	301	53.18%	253	44.70%	10	1.77%	0	0.00%	2	0.35%	48	8.48%	566
Willington	151	79.47%	33	17.37%	3	1.58%	3	1.58%	0	0.00%	118	62.11%	190
Wilton	215	58.74%	150	40.98%	0	0.00%	1	0.27%	0	0.00%	65	17.76%	366
Winchester	861	48.40%	899	50.53%	9	0.51%	9	0.51%	1	0.06%	-38	-2.14%	1,779
Windham	1,023	45.83%	1,152	51.61%	22	0.99%	32	1.43%	3	0.13%	-129	-5.78%	2,232
Windsor	465	50.49%	410	44.52%	15	1.63%	27	2.93%	4	0.43%	55	5.97%	921
Windsor Locks	236	36.09%	408	62.39%	5	0.76%	4	0.61%	1	0.15%	-172	-26.30%	654
Wolcott	75	69.44%	33	30.56%	0	0.00%	0	0.00%	0	0.00%	42	38.89%	108
Woodbridge	100	65.36%	50	32.68%	1	0.65%	2	1.31%	0	0.00%	50	32.68%	153
Woodbury	199	63.78%	108	34.62%	1	0.32%	4	1.28%	0	0.00%	91	29.17%	312
Woodstock	228	71.70%	84	26.42%	3	0.94%	3	0.94%	0	0.00%	144	45.28%	318
Totals	106,514	49.80%	99,786	46.66%	5,179	2.42%	1,789	0.84%	606	0.28%	6,728	3.15%	213,874

== See also ==
- United States presidential elections in Connecticut
