= Kurt Vail =

American politician

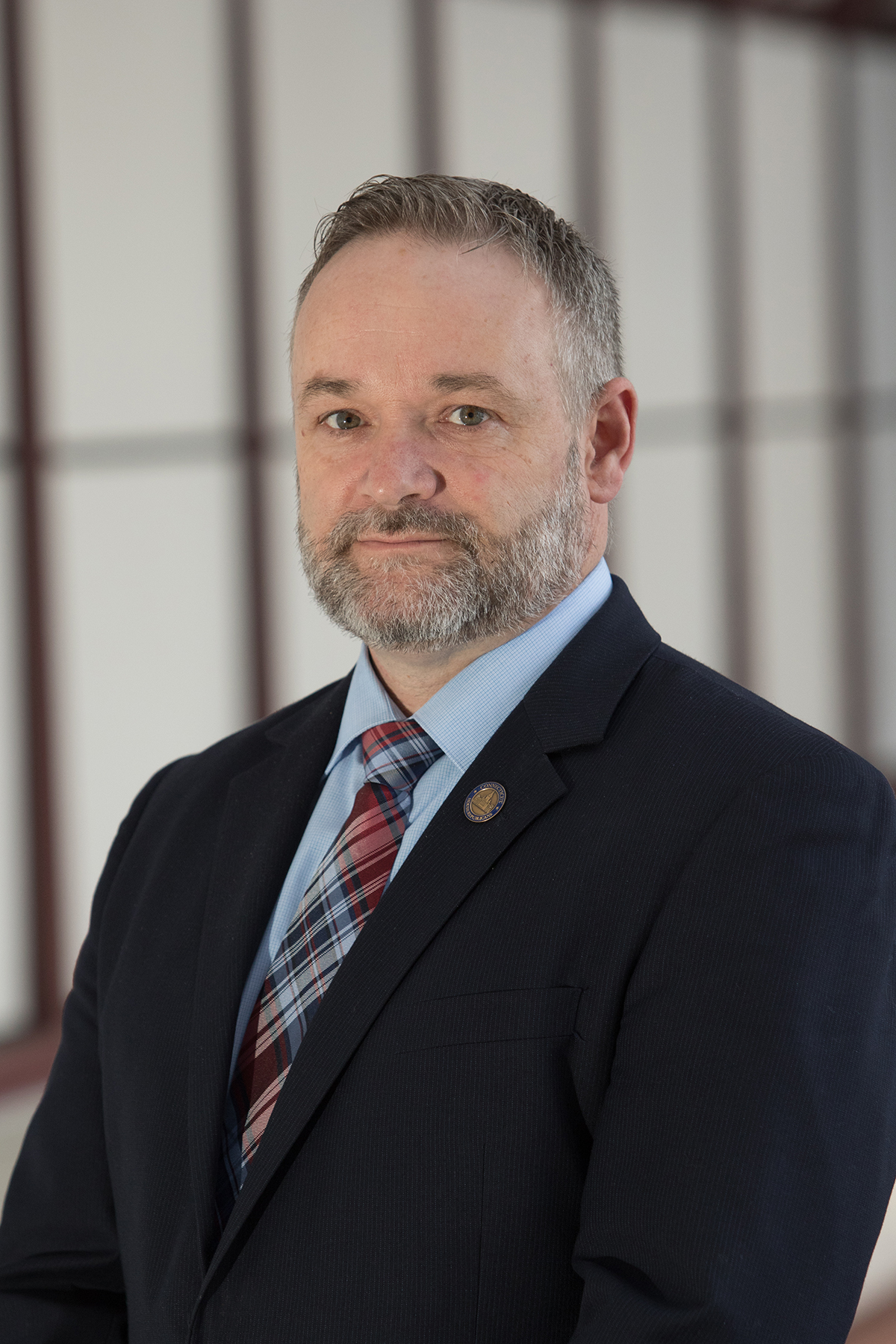

Member of the Connecticut House of Representatives from the 52nd district
- Incumbent
- Assumed office January 2015
- Preceded by: Penny Bacchiochi

Personal details
- Born: August 4, 1968 (age 58)
- Party: Republican
- Children: 4
- Website: Legislative Homepage

Kurt Vail (born August 4, 1968) is an American politician and member of the Republican party. He is a current member of the Connecticut House of Representatives representing Connecticut's 52nd assembly district in the General Assembly. The district is made up of Somers, Stafford, Union, and Woodstock. Vail was first elected in 2014, and is currently serving in his fifth term.

Vail has served as the ranking member of the Veterans and Military Affairs Committee since 2019. He also sits on the Aging, Commerce, and Public Safety and Security Committees.

Vail also served in the community as a member of the Stafford Board of Education and the Downtown Revitalization Committee. He also serves as a member of the Stafford Board of Selectmen after winning election in 2021.
