= John Mordasky =

American politician (1925–2023)

Member of the Connecticut House of Representatives from the 52nd district
- In office January 5, 1983 – January 8, 2003
- Preceded by: Albert Tucker Dolge
- Succeeded by: Penny Bacchiochi
- In office January 3, 1979 – January 7, 1981
- Preceded by: John E. Julian
- Succeeded by: Albert Tucker Dolge

Personal details
- Born: December 5, 1925 Stafford, Connecticut
- Died: April 1, 2023 (aged 97) Stafford Springs, Connecticut
- Party: Democratic

John Mordasky (December 5, 1925 – April 1, 2023) was an American politician who served in the Connecticut House of Representatives from the 52nd district from 1979 to 1981 and from 1973 to 2003.

He died on April 1, 2023, in Stafford Springs, Connecticut at age 97.
