= Stafford Hollow, Connecticut =

- Stafford Hollow Historic District
- U.S. National Register of Historic Places
- U.S. Historic district
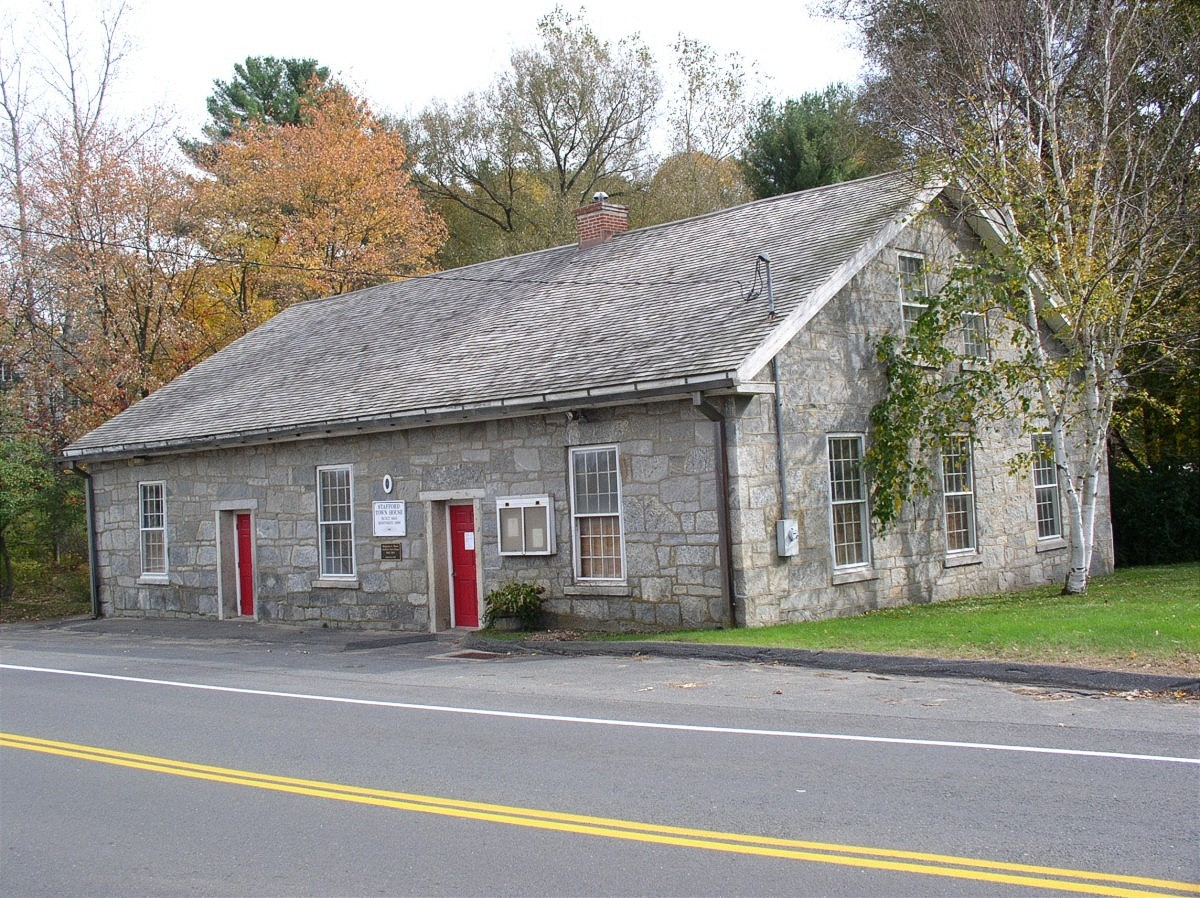
- Stafford Town House

- Location within Connecticut Location within the United States
- Location: Roughly parts of Leonard, Murphy, Old Monson, Orcuttville, & Patten Roads, Stafford, Connecticut
- Coordinates: 41°59′8″N 72°17′26″W
- Architectural style: Colonial Revival, Greek Revival, Late Victorian
- NRHP reference No.: 87002032
- Added to NRHP: October 15, 1987

Stafford Hollow, also known as Stafford, Stafford Village, or Furnace Hollow, is a village in the town of Stafford, in Tolland County, Connecticut, United States, located at the junction of Route 19 and Route 319. Stafford Hollow was the town center of Stafford during the 18th and 19th centuries, before the growth of the village of Stafford Springs.

A 0.26-square-mile (0.67 km^{2}) area of the village has been designated a historic district, the Stafford Hollow Historic District, which includes Colonial Revival, Greek Revival, and Late Victorian architecture. Twentieth-century houses on the roads radiating away from the village center are not included in the historic district.

As early as 1779, Stafford Hollow was the site of a blast furnace, known as Phelps blast furnace, that processed bog iron ores. The Phelps furnace is reputed to have produced cannon and cannonballs, kettles, and pots for use by the Continental Army. It operated until 1840, when the local ore supply had been used up.

Stafford Hollow Historic District was listed on the National Register of Historic Places in 1987. The historic district includes five of the Town of Stafford's most significant buildings. The district includes the Pinney School building, a Queen Anne style structure from 1895. It includes the Valley Cotton Mill site, now ruins, which was destroyed in 1900.

== See also ==
- National Register of Historic Places listings in Tolland County, Connecticut
