= Monson Center, Massachusetts =

- Census-designated place
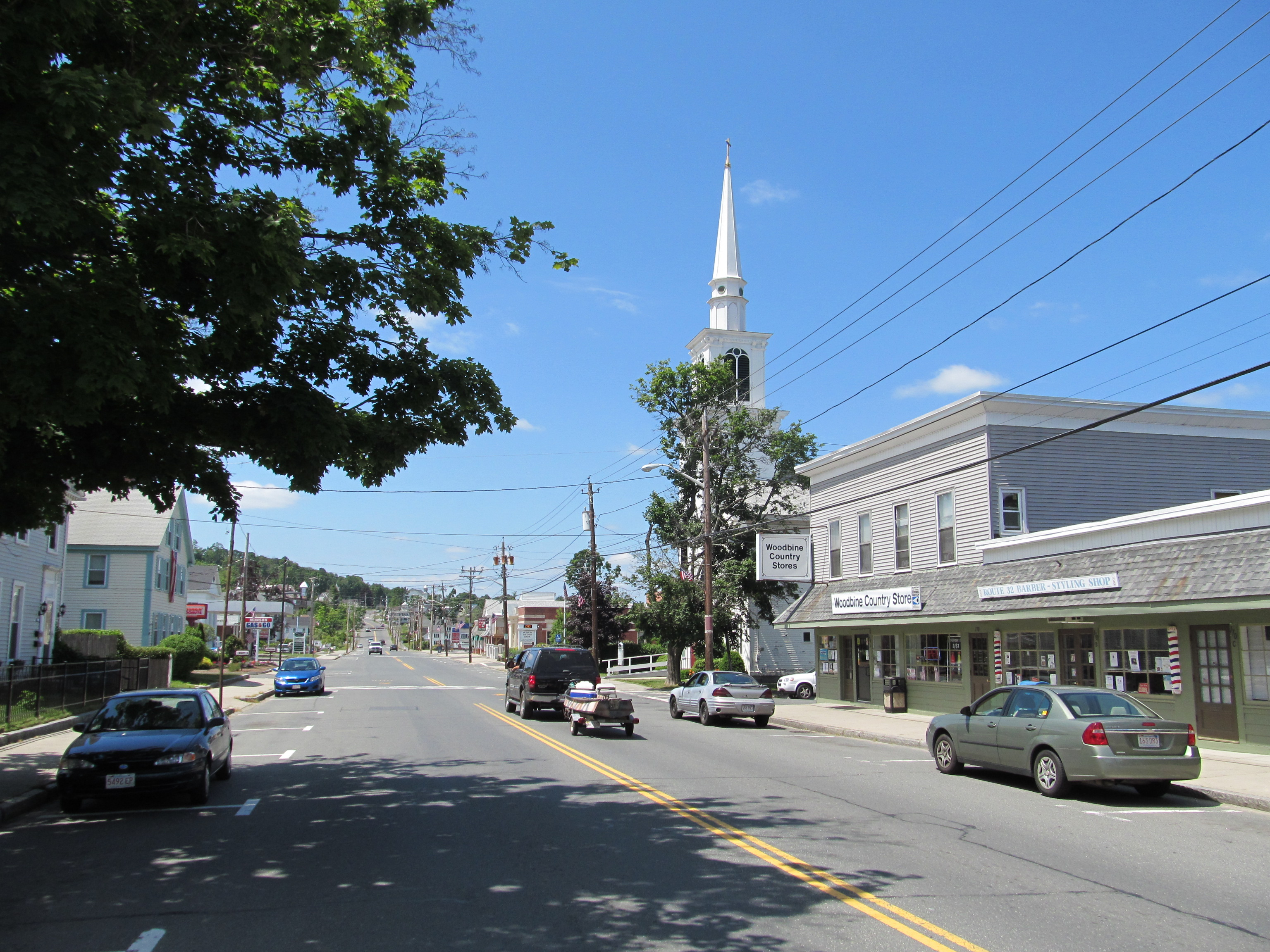
- Main Street

- Location in Hampden County in Massachusetts
- Coordinates: 42°5′57″N 72°18′36″W
- Country: United States
- State: Massachusetts
- County: Hampden
- Town: Monson

Area
  - Total: 3.37 sq mi (8.72 km^{2})
  - Land: 3.36 sq mi (8.69 km^{2})
  - Water: 0.012 sq mi (0.03 km^{2})
- Elevation: 370 ft (110 m)

Population (2020)
  - Total: 1,952
  - Density: 581.9/sq mi (224.66/km^{2})
- Time zone: UTC-5 (Eastern (EST))
  - Summer (DST): UTC-4 (EDT)
- ZIP Code: 01057 (Monson)
- Area code: 413
- FIPS code: 25-42180
- GNIS feature ID: 2378172

Monson Center is a census-designated place (CDP) in the town of Monson in Hampden County, Massachusetts, United States. As of the 2020 census, Monson Center had a population of 1,952. It is part of the Springfield, Massachusetts Metropolitan Statistical Area.

== Geography ==
Monson Center is in the east-central part of the town of Monson, located at 42°5′51″N 72°18′54″W (42.097633, -72.314865). The CDP includes the town center ("Monson"), the adjacent village of South Monson, and rural land to the east and west of the villages. The eastern limit of the CDP is King Street and East Hill Road; the southern limit is Munn Street, Maple Street, and Bliss Street; the western limit is Ely Road, High Street, and Margaret Street; and the northern limit is Thompson Street, Chestnut Street, and Brimfield Road. The two villages are in the valley of Chicopee Creek, a north-flowing tributary of the Quaboag River. Massachusetts Route 32 (Main Street) runs through the valley and the two villages, leading north 4 miles (6 km) to Palmer and south 11 miles (18 km) to Stafford Springs, Connecticut.

According to the United States Census Bureau, the Monson Center CDP has a total area of 3.4 square miles (8.7 km^{2}), of which 0.01 square miles (0.03 km^{2}), or 0.33%, are water.

== Demographics ==
Historical population
Census	Pop.	Note	%±
2020	1,952		—
U.S. Decennial Census

=== 2020 census ===
As of the 2020 census, Monson Center had a population of 1,952. The median age was 47.6 years. 18.4% of residents were under the age of 18 and 23.7% of residents were 65 years of age or older. For every 100 females there were 104.8 males, and for every 100 females age 18 and over there were 106.6 males age 18 and over.

0.0% of residents lived in urban areas, while 100.0% lived in rural areas.

There were 901 households in Monson Center, of which 20.6% had children under the age of 18 living in them. Of all households, 39.1% were married-couple households, 23.6% were households with a male householder and no spouse or partner present, and 28.6% were households with a female householder and no spouse or partner present. About 33.2% of all households were made up of individuals and 14.0% had someone living alone who was 65 years of age or older.

There were 966 housing units, of which 6.7% were vacant. The homeowner vacancy rate was 0.3% and the rental vacancy rate was 4.4%.

Racial composition as of the 2020 census
Race	Number	Percent
White	1,793	91.9%
Black or African American	13	0.7%
American Indian and Alaska Native	5	0.3%
Asian	18	0.9%
Native Hawaiian and Other Pacific Islander	0	0.0%
Some other race	19	1.0%
Two or more races	104	5.3%
Hispanic or Latino (of any race)	62	3.2%

=== 2000 census ===
As of the 2000 census, there were 2,103 people, 884 households, and 524 families residing in the CDP. The population density was 238.8/km^{2} (618.6/mi^{2}). There were 931 housing units at an average density of 105.7/km^{2} (273.8/mi^{2}). The racial makeup of the CDP was 96.43% White, 1.14% African American, 0.19% Native American, 0.57% Asian, 0.05% Pacific Islander, 0.38% from other races, and 1.24% from two or more races. Hispanic or Latino of any race were 1.33% of the population.

There were 884 households, out of which 30.9% had children under the age of 18 living with them, 42.0% were married couples living together, 13.6% had a female householder with no husband present, and 40.7% were non-families. 34.6% of all households were made up of individuals, and 15.3% had someone living alone who was 65 years of age or older. The average household size was 2.38 and the average family size was 3.10.

In the CDP, the population was spread out, with 26.0% under the age of 18, 7.5% from 18 to 24, 30.2% from 25 to 44, 21.8% from 45 to 64, and 14.5% who were 65 years of age or older. The median age was 38 years. For every 100 females, there were 89.6 males. For every 100 females age 18 and over, there were 86.8 males.

The median income for a household in the CDP was $40,000, and the median income for a family was $45,795. Males had a median income of $34,375 versus $25,244 for females. The per capita income for the CDP was $18,526. About 4.4% of families and 4.2% of the population were below the poverty line, including 1.4% of those under age 18 and 3.3% of those age 65 or over.
