= Hydeville, Connecticut =

Village in Connecticut, United States

Coordinates: 41°59′35″N 72°16′34″W

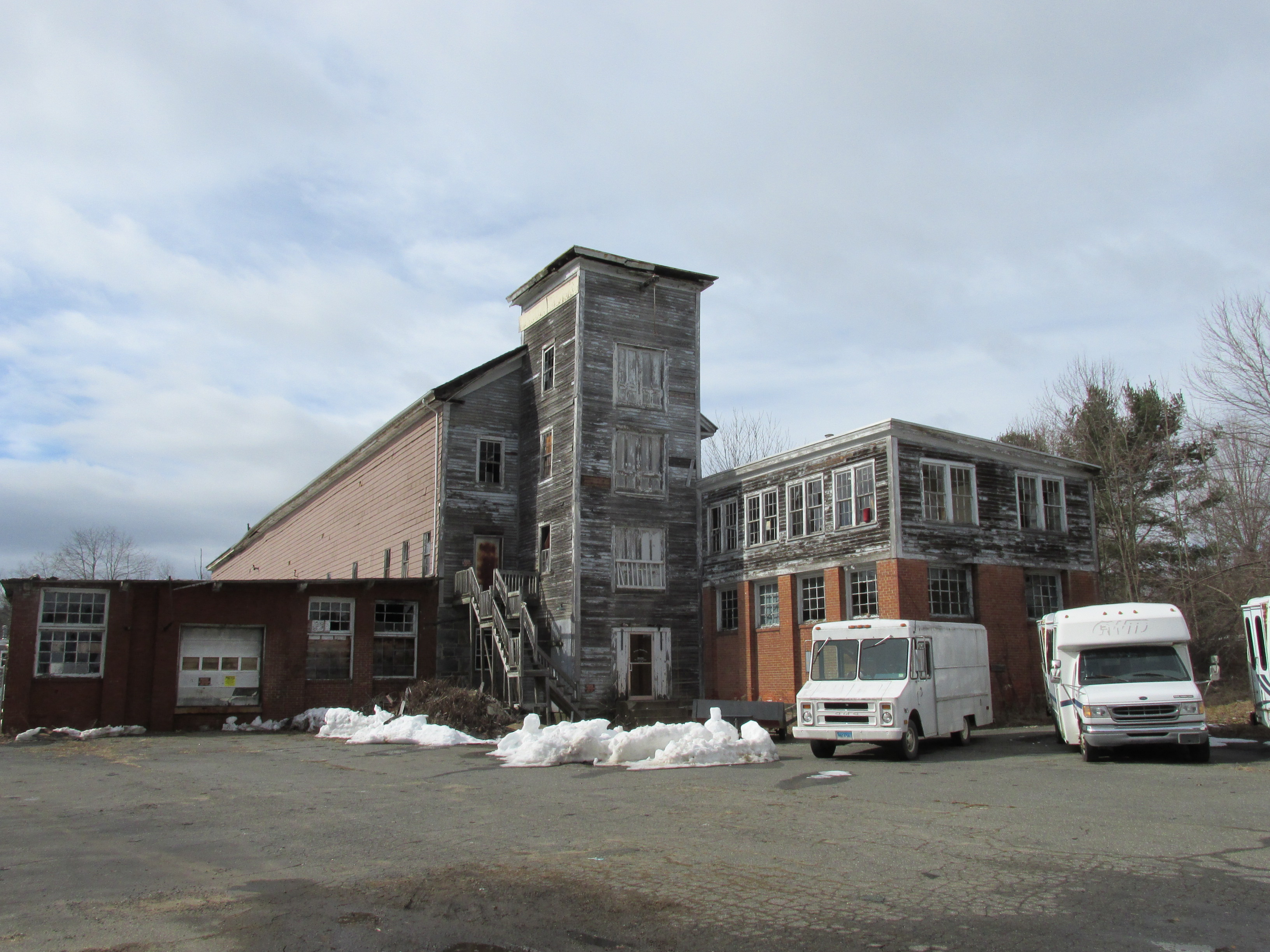
Wilson Woodworks

Hydeville is a rural section of the town of Stafford, Connecticut, United States, located on Furnace Creek. Historically, it was also known as Haydenville.

== History ==
The Lafayette blast furnace, established in Hydeville in 1799 to process bog iron, is reputed to have been the first iron furnace in the state to cast stoves. It operated until 1840, when the local ore supply had been used up.

In the 1890s, Hydeville was described as "consisting of a few houses about a woolen mill" with a population of about 130. Several of the houses in the village were tenement buildings containing several individual dwelling units.

Wilson Woodworks, a producer of wood flooring, was once located in Hydeville, but moved to the town of Windsor, about 30 miles to the southwest.
