= Tolland County, Connecticut =

County in Connecticut, United States

- County
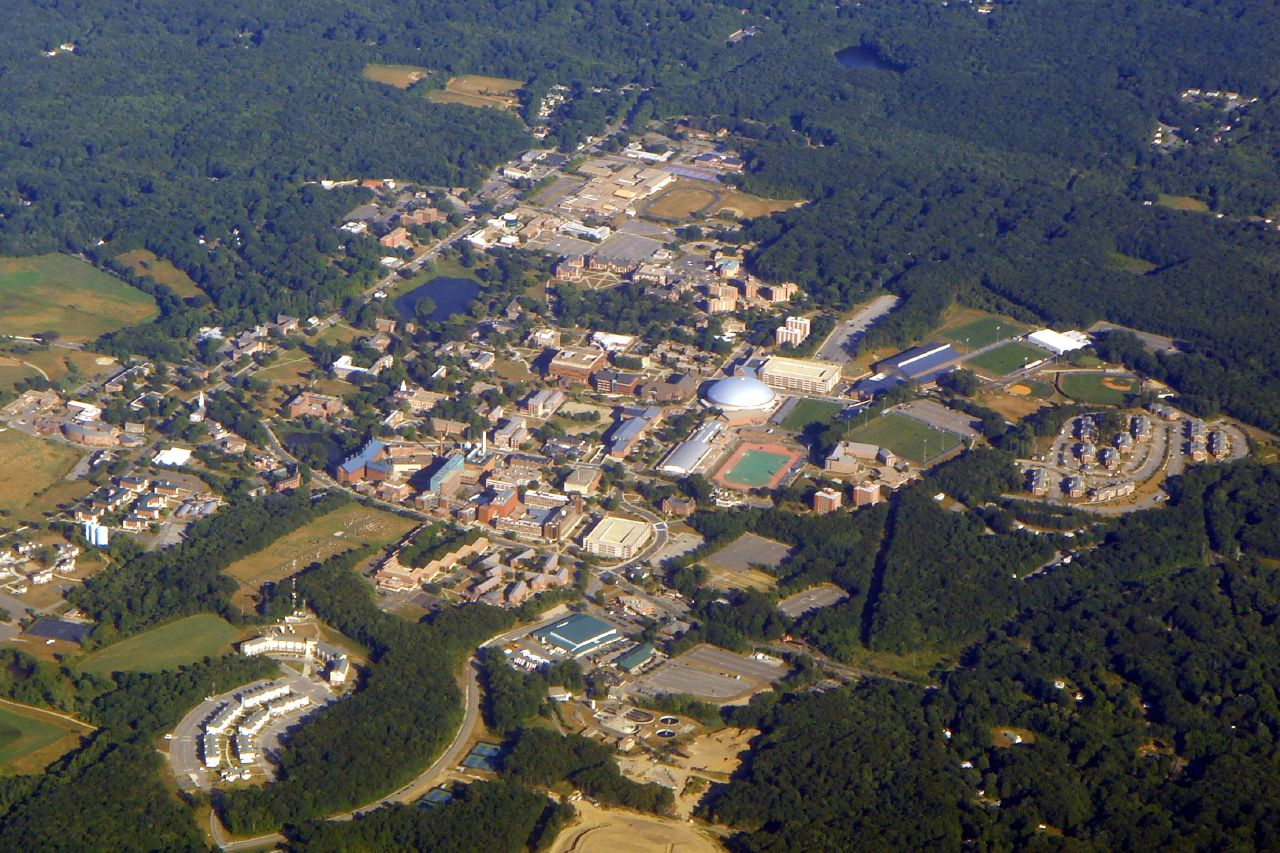
- The University of Connecticut's main campus, in Storrs

- Location within the U.S. state of Connecticut
- Coordinates: 41°51′N 72°20′W
- Country: United States
- State: Connecticut
- Founded: 1785
- Named for: Tolland, Somerset
- Seat: none (since 1960); Tolland (1785-1889); Rockville (1889-1960)
- Largest town: Vernon

Area
  - Total: 417 sq mi (1,080 km^{2})
  - Land: 410 sq mi (1,100 km^{2})
  - Water: 6.8 sq mi (18 km^{2}) 1.6%

Population (2020)
  - Total: 149,788 ▼
  - Density: 359.2/sq mi (138.7/km^{2})
- Time zone: UTC−5 (Eastern)
  - Summer (DST): UTC−4 (EDT)
- Congressional district: 2nd

Interactive map of Tolland County, Connecticut

Tolland County (/ˈtɒlənd/) is a county in the northeastern part of the U.S. state of Connecticut. As of the 2020 census, its population was 149,788. It is incorporated into 13 towns and was originally formed on October 13, 1785, from portions of eastern Hartford County and western Windham County.

The county is included in the Hartford-East Hartford-Middletown, CT Metropolitan Statistical Area.

Counties in Connecticut have no governmental function; all legal power is vested in the state, city and town governments. The office of High Sheriff in Connecticut counties was officially abolished by ballot in 2000, and corrections and court services were transferred to the state marshals. Tolland County has the same boundaries as the Tolland Judicial District. On June 6, 2022, the U.S. Census Bureau formally recognized Connecticut's nine councils of governments as county equivalents instead of the state's eight counties. Connecticut's county governments were disbanded in 1960, and the councils of governments took over some of the local governmental functions. Connecticut's eight historical counties continue to exist in name only, and are no longer considered for statistical purposes.

== Geography ==
According to the U.S. Census Bureau, the county has a total area of 417 square miles (1,080 km^{2}), of which 410 square miles (1,100 km^{2}) is land and 6.8 square miles (18 km^{2}) (1.6%) is water. It is the second-smallest county in Connecticut by land area and smallest by total area.

=== Adjacent counties ===
- Hartford County - west
- New London County - south
- Windham County - east
- Hampden County, Massachusetts - northwest
- Worcester County, Massachusetts - northeast

== Demographics ==
Historical population
Census	Pop.	Note	%±
1790	13,251		—
1800	14,319		8.1%
1810	13,779		−3.8%
1820	14,330		4.0%
1830	18,702		30.5%
1840	17,980		−3.9%
1850	20,091		11.7%
1860	20,709		3.1%
1870	22,000		6.2%
1880	24,112		9.6%
1890	25,081		4.0%
1900	24,523		−2.2%
1910	26,459		7.9%
1920	27,216		2.9%
1930	28,659		5.3%
1940	31,866		11.2%
1950	44,709		40.3%
1960	68,737		53.7%
1970	103,440		50.5%
1980	114,823		11.0%
1990	128,699		12.1%
2000	136,364		6.0%
2010	152,691		12.0%
2020	149,788		−1.9%
U.S. Decennial Census; 1790-1960 1900-1990; 1990-2000 2010-2018

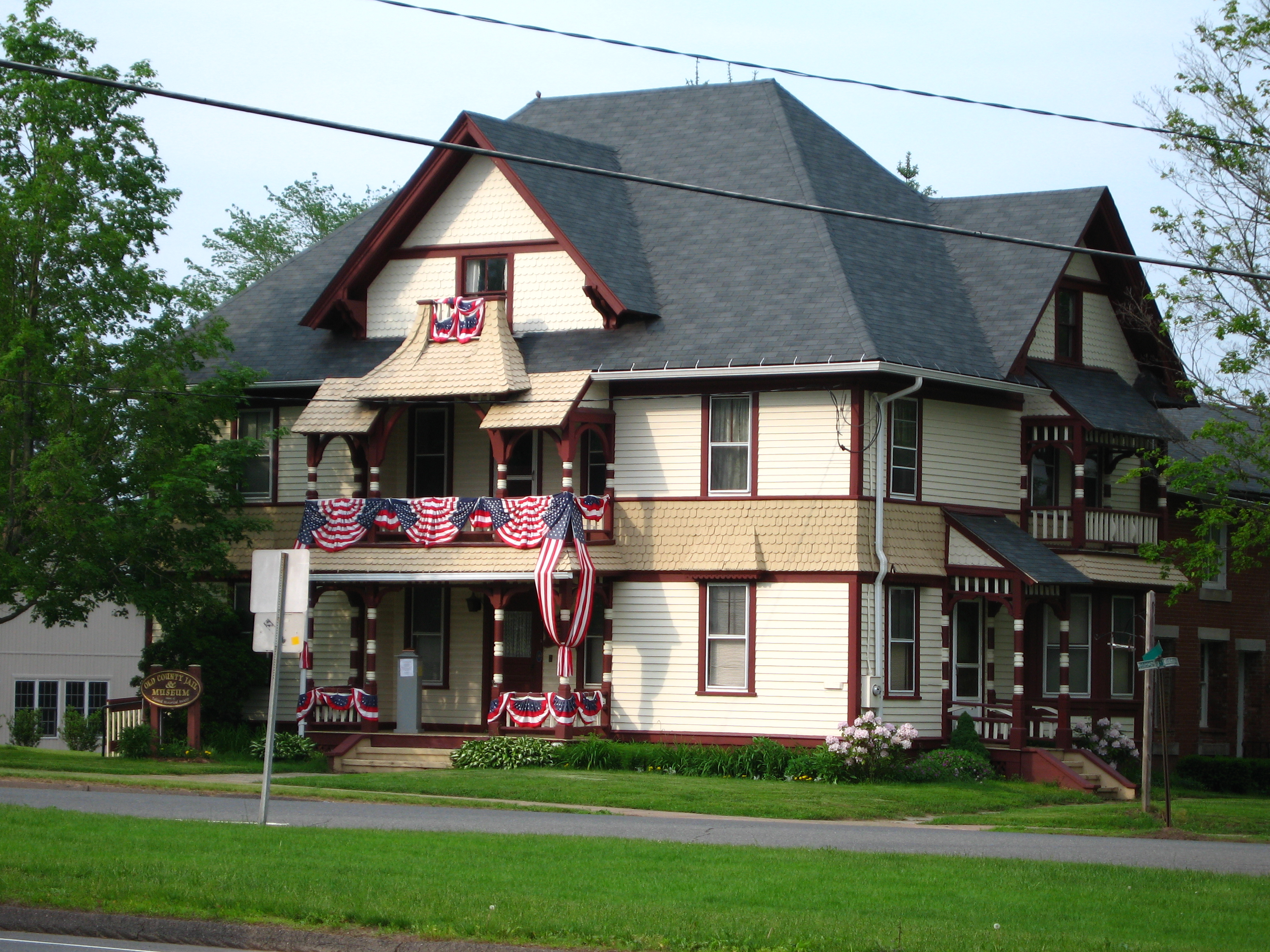
Old Tolland County Jail

=== 2020 census ===
As of the 2020 census, the county had a population of 149,788. Of the residents, 17.5% were under the age of 18 and 17.0% were 65 years of age or older; the median age was 39.3 years. For every 100 females there were 98.9 males, and for every 100 females age 18 and over there were 97.6 males. 49.7% of residents lived in urban areas and 50.3% lived in rural areas.

The racial makeup of the county was 82.0% White, 3.6% Black or African American, 0.2% American Indian and Alaska Native, 5.7% Asian, 0.0% Native Hawaiian and Pacific Islander, 2.3% from some other race, and 6.2% from two or more races. Hispanic or Latino residents of any race comprised 6.5% of the population.

There were 56,894 households in the county, of which 26.6% had children under the age of 18 living with them and 24.0% had a female householder with no spouse or partner present. About 27.3% of all households were made up of individuals and 11.1% had someone living alone who was 65 years of age or older.

There were 60,876 housing units, of which 6.5% were vacant. Among occupied housing units, 71.3% were owner-occupied and 28.7% were renter-occupied. The homeowner vacancy rate was 1.2% and the rental vacancy rate was 6.0%.

=== Racial and ethnic composition ===
Tolland County, Connecticut – Racial and ethnic composition Note: the US Census treats Hispanic/Latino as an ethnic category. This table excludes Latinos from the racial categories and assigns them to a separate category. Hispanics/Latinos may be of any race.
Race / Ethnicity (NH = Non-Hispanic)	Pop 1980	Pop 1990	Pop 2000	Pop 2010	Pop 2020	% 1980	% 1990	% 2000	% 2010	% 2020
White alone (NH)	110,979	121,269	124,014	133,589	120,021	96.65%	94.23%	90.94%	87.49%	80.13%
Black or African American alone (NH)	1,759	2,533	3,480	4,701	5,074	1.53%	1.97%	2.55%	3.08%	3.39%
Native American or Alaska Native alone (NH)	125	206	230	218	182	0.11%	0.16%	0.17%	0.14%	0.12%
Asian alone (NH)	706	2,421	3,069	5,084	8,438	0.61%	1.88%	2.25%	3.33%	5.63%
Native Hawaiian or Pacific Islander alone (NH)	x	x	36	29	44	x	x	0.03%	0.02%	0.03%
Other race alone (NH)	265	54	162	202	636	0.23%	0.04%	0.12%	0.13%	0.42%
Mixed race or Multiracial (NH)	x	x	1,500	2,266	5,694	x	x	1.10%	1.48%	3.80%
Hispanic or Latino (any race)	989	2,216	3,873	6,602	9,699	0.86%	1.72%	2.84%	4.32%	6.48%
Total	114,823	128,699	136,364	152,691	149,788	100.00%	100.00%	100.00%	100.00%	100.00%

=== 2010 census ===
As of the 2010 United States census, there were 152,691 people, 54,477 households, and 36,707 families living in the county. The population density was 372.2 inhabitants per square mile (143.7/km^{2}). There were 57,963 housing units at an average density of 141.3 per square mile (54.6/km^{2}). In terms of ethnic/racial background, the 2010 Census found that most of Tolland County's residents were white (89.8%), followed by 3.4% Asian, 3.3% Black or African American, 0.2% American Indian, 1.6% from other races, and 1.8% from two or more races. Those of Hispanic or Latino origin made up 4.3% of the population. In terms of European ancestry, 22.0% were Irish, 16.8% were Italian, 14.3% were English, 14.2% were German, 10.6% were Polish, 5.6% were French Canadian, while 3.5% of the population identified their ancestry as 'American'.

Of the 54,477 households, 31.5% had children under the age of 18 living with them, 54.9% were married couples living together, 8.6% had a female householder with no spouse, 32.6% were non-families, and 24.2% of all households were made up of one individual. The average household size was 2.5 and the average family size was 3.0 people. The median age was 38.3 years.

The median income for a household in the county was $77,175 and the median income for a family was $91,631. Men had a median income of $62,579 versus $46,818 for women. The per capita income for the county was $33,108. About 3.2% of families and 6.4% of the population were below the poverty line, including 5.2% of those under age 18 and 4.6% of those age 65 or over.

=== 2000 census ===
As of the year 2000, there were 136,364 people, 49,431 households, and 34,156 families living in the county. The population density was 332 sq mi (128/km^{2}). There were 51,570 housing units at an average density of 126 per square mile (49/km^{2}). The ethnic and racial background of the county's population was 92.3% White, 2.7% Black or African American, 0.2% Native American, 2.3% Asian, 0.03% Pacific Islander, 1.1% from another group, and 1.4% multiracial, while 2.8% of the population were Hispanic or Latino (identifying with any race). Among European-Americans, 14.9% were of Irish, 14.1% Italian, 9.9% English, 8.8% French, 8.2% German, 8.0% Polish and 5.7% French Canadian ancestry. About 9 in 10 spoke English, while 2.9% spoke Spanish and 1.6% French as their first language.

There were 49,431 households, out of which 33.30% had children under the age of 18 living with them, 58.00% were married couples living together, 8.00% had a female householder with no husband present, and 30.90% were non-families. 23.50% of all households were made up of individuals, and 7.70% had someone living alone who was 65 years of age or older. The average household size was 2.54 and the average family size was 3.03.

In the county, the population was spread out, with 23.1% under the age of 18, 12.9% from 18 to 24, 30.7% from 25 to 44, 23.2% from 45 to 64, and 10.2% who were 65 years of age or older. The median age was 36 years. For every 100 females of any age, there were 100.6 males. For every 100 women age 18 and over, there were 99.5 men.

The median income for a household in the county was $59,044, and the median income for a family was $70,856. Men had a median income of $46,619 versus $34,255 for women. The per capita income for the county was $25,474. About 5.6% of the population and 2.9% of all families earned below the poverty line. Out of the total people living in poverty, 4.6% were children, and 5.2% aged 65 or older.

=== Demographic breakdown by town ===
==== Income ====
Data is from the 2010 United States Census and the 2006-2010 American Community Survey 5-Year Estimates.

Rank	Town		Per capita income	Median household income	Median family income	Population	Number of households
1	Bolton	Town	$42,312	$89,432	$93,472	4,980	1,915
2	Tolland	Town	$41,883	$99,764	$108,564	15,052	5,312
3	Hebron	Town	$39,416	$108,444	$112,894	9,686	3,398
4	Andover	Town	$38,710	$84,274	$96,286	3,303	1,244
5	Ellington	Town	$37,322	$81,582	$95,547	15,602	6,257
6	Columbia	Town	$36,865	$85,893	$102,353	5,485	2,154
7	Somers	Town	$35,134	$98,977	$108,636	11,444	3,328
8	Coventry	Town	$34,524	$86,244	$91,931	12,435	4,783
9	Vernon	Town	$33,160	$61,103	$77,649	29,179	12,976
10	Union	Town	$32,032	$79,911	$84,750	854	334
11	Willington	Town	$29,616	$62,500	$96,422	6,041	2,423
12	Stafford	Town	$28,027	$64,494	$69,789	12,087	4,767
13	Mansfield	Town	$21,579	$65,839	$84,128	26,543	5,586

==== Race ====
Data is from the 2007-2011 American Community Survey 5-Year Estimates, ACS Demographic and Housing Estimates, "Race alone or in combination with one or more other races."

Rank	Town		Population	White	Black	Asian	American Indian	Other	Hispanic
1	Vernon	Town	29,199	88.5%	8.8%	4.0%	0.8%	1.8%	7.1%
2	Mansfield	Town	26,130	84.4%	6.2%	10.7%	0.3%	1.8%	6.3%
3	Ellington	Town	15,394	96.0%	1.6%	2.7%	0.3%	0.2%	1.1%
4	Tolland	Town	14,931	97.2%	1.9%	2.4%	1.5%	0.4%	3.1%
5	Coventry	Town	12,402	97.1%	1.6%	1.7%	0.6%	0.3%	2.1%
6	Stafford	Town	12,055	97.4%	1.2%	1.6%	0.6%	0.9%	3.3%
7	Somers	Town	11,385	85.3%	10.0%	2.8%	0.6%	4.0%	5.8%
8	Hebron	Town	9,620	99.0%	0.0%	1.6%	0.9%	0.5%	2.4%
9	Willington	Town	6,070	98.9%	3.7%	0.2%	0.7%	0.2%	2.4%
10	Columbia	Town	5,449	97.8%	1.9%	1.7%	1.9%	0.4%	2.1%
11	Bolton	Town	5,006	98.0%	2.9%	0.0%	0.9%	0.8%	4.5%
12	Andover	Town	3,143	96.5%	3.0%	1.7%	1.3%	0.0%	0.0%
13	Union	Town	990	99.4%	0.0%	0.7%	1.6%	0.0%	1.3%

== Communities ==
=== Towns ===
- Andover
- Bolton
- Columbia
- Coventry
- Ellington
- Hebron
- Mansfield
- Somers
- Stafford
- Tolland
- Union
- Vernon
- Willington

=== Other communities ===
- Amston
- Coventry Lake
- Crystal Lake
- Gilead
- Hebron Center
- Hydeville
- Mashapaug
- Mansfield Center
- Rockville
- Somers center
- South Coventry
- Stafford Hollow
- Stafford Springs
- Storrs

== Politics ==
For over a century, Tolland County behaved like a typical northern Yankee Republican county in presidential elections, only voting Democratic in 1932, 1936, 1964, and 1968. However, in recent elections, Tolland County has become a Democratic leaning county, following the trend of many other counties in greater New England. This started with Bill Clinton's plurality in the 1992 election and Democrats have won the county in every presidential election since then. That being said, Tolland County has been much friendlier to Republicans in local elections, as Tolland County would still vote Republican in recent gubernatorial elections. In 2022, Governor Ned Lamont became the first Democrat to win Tolland County in a gubernatorial race since 1994.

United States presidential election results for Tolland County, Connecticut
Year	Republican		Democratic		Third party(ies)	
Year	No.	%	No.	%	No.	%
1884	2,716	53.64%	2,197	43.39%	150	2.96%
1888	2,734	50.90%	2,402	44.72%	235	4.38%
1892	2,655	48.98%	2,606	48.07%	160	2.95%
1896	3,576	70.50%	1,044	20.58%	452	8.91%
1900	2,997	61.48%	1,678	34.42%	200	4.10%
1904	2,964	58.66%	1,772	35.07%	317	6.27%
1908	2,816	57.35%	1,742	35.48%	352	7.17%
1912	2,024	42.66%	1,901	40.06%	820	17.28%
1916	2,758	54.72%	2,032	40.32%	250	4.96%
1920	5,135	66.13%	2,308	29.72%	322	4.15%
1924	5,161	62.29%	2,239	27.02%	885	10.68%
1928	6,502	59.74%	4,256	39.10%	126	1.16%
1932	5,857	51.85%	4,985	44.13%	455	4.03%
1936	5,965	45.43%	6,676	50.85%	488	3.72%
1940	7,503	49.37%	7,669	50.46%	25	0.16%
1944	8,208	51.15%	7,721	48.12%	117	0.73%
1948	9,012	52.01%	7,970	45.99%	347	2.00%
1952	13,466	58.69%	9,425	41.08%	52	0.23%
1956	15,880	63.54%	9,111	36.46%	0	0.00%
1960	15,386	51.35%	14,575	48.65%	0	0.00%
1964	9,951	30.90%	22,195	68.92%	58	0.18%
1968	16,666	45.47%	18,007	49.13%	1,982	5.41%
1972	25,798	56.45%	19,505	42.68%	394	0.86%
1976	23,703	50.41%	23,079	49.08%	242	0.51%
1980	22,127	43.95%	18,557	36.86%	9,662	19.19%
1984	32,981	61.88%	20,103	37.72%	214	0.40%
1988	28,375	50.80%	26,884	48.13%	602	1.08%
1992	20,632	31.16%	27,425	41.42%	18,158	27.42%
1996	19,394	33.08%	30,007	51.18%	9,224	15.73%
2000	24,705	39.40%	33,554	53.52%	4,441	7.08%
2004	31,245	43.56%	39,146	54.57%	1,338	1.87%
2008	29,266	38.76%	45,053	59.67%	1,182	1.57%
2012	30,450	42.89%	39,366	55.45%	1,175	1.66%
2016	34,194	44.16%	38,506	49.73%	4,724	6.10%
2020	34,838	43.16%	44,151	54.70%	1,725	2.14%
2024	36,773	45.11%	43,311	53.13%	1,436	1.76%

United States Senate election results for Tolland County, Connecticut1
Year	Republican		Democratic		Third party(ies)	
Year	No.	%	No.	%	No.	%
2012	30,877	45.22%	35,781	52.40%	1,621	2.37%
2018	28,046	42.67%	36,713	55.86%	970	1.48%
2024	34,433	43.30%	43,691	54.94%	1,404	1.77%

United States Senate election results for Tolland County, Connecticut2
Year	Republican		Democratic		Third party(ies)	
Year	No.	%	No.	%	No.	%
2010	24,148	44.78%	28,638	53.11%	1,137	2.11%
2016	27,989	36.78%	45,949	60.38%	2,166	2.85%
2022	27,431	46.05%	32,129	53.94%	3	0.01%

Connecticut Gubernatorial election results for Tolland County
Year	Republican		Democratic		Third party(ies)	
Year	No.	%	No.	%	No.	%
2010	27,501	51.19%	25,096	46.72%	1,123	2.09%
2014	27,315	52.59%	23,887	45.99%	738	1.42%
2018	31,882	47.98%	29,992	45.13%	4,576	6.89%
2022	27,748	46.36%	31,348	52.38%	753	1.26%

== In popular culture ==
Tolland County is briefly referenced in the novel Moby-Dick by Herman Melville as the place that the ill-fated African-American shipmate, Pip, comes from.

== See also ==
- National Register of Historic Places listings in Tolland County, Connecticut
- New England Civil War Museum
