= Somers (CDP), Connecticut =

Census-designated place in Connecticut, United States

Somers, Connecticut
- Census-designated place
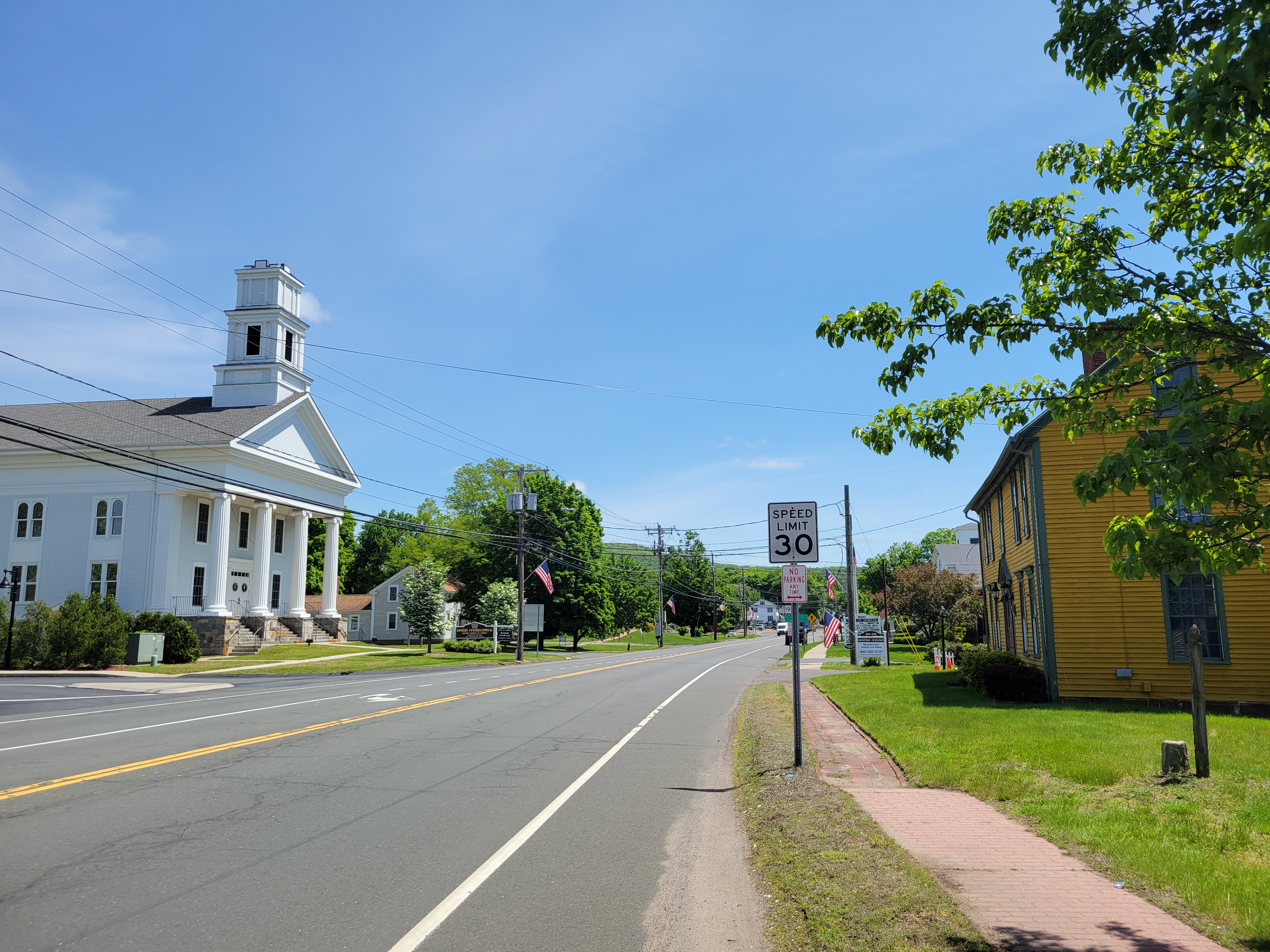
- Main Street eastbound

- Location within Connecticut Location within the United States
- Coordinates: 41°59′7″N 72°26′50″W
- Country: United States
- State: Connecticut
- County: Tolland
- Town: Somers

Area
  - Total: 2.1 sq mi (5.4 km^{2})
  - Land: 2.1 sq mi (5.4 km^{2})
  - Water: 0.0 sq mi (0 km^{2})
- Elevation: 272 ft (83 m)

Population (2020)
  - Total: 1,990
  - Density: 948/sq mi (366/km^{2})
- Time zone: UTC-5 (Eastern (EST))
  - Summer (DST): UTC-4 (EDT)
- ZIP Code: 06071
- Area codes: 860/959
- FIPS code: 09-69150
- GNIS feature ID: 2378343

Somers is a census-designated place (CDP) comprising the primary village in the town of Somers, Tolland County, Connecticut, United States. As of the 2020 United States census, the Somers CDP had a population of 1,990, out of 10,255 in the town of Somers.

== History ==
The Somers Historic District occupies 100 acres (40 ha) at the center of the village. Most of the buildings are early 19th-century residences, with Federal or Greek Revival style, although there are a selection of later 19th-century styles represented as well. The older properties are largely clustered in three places: on Springfield Road near Main, the eastern end of Main Street, and the area just west of where the modern (constructed in 1950) town hall stands.
