= Somers, Connecticut =

- Town
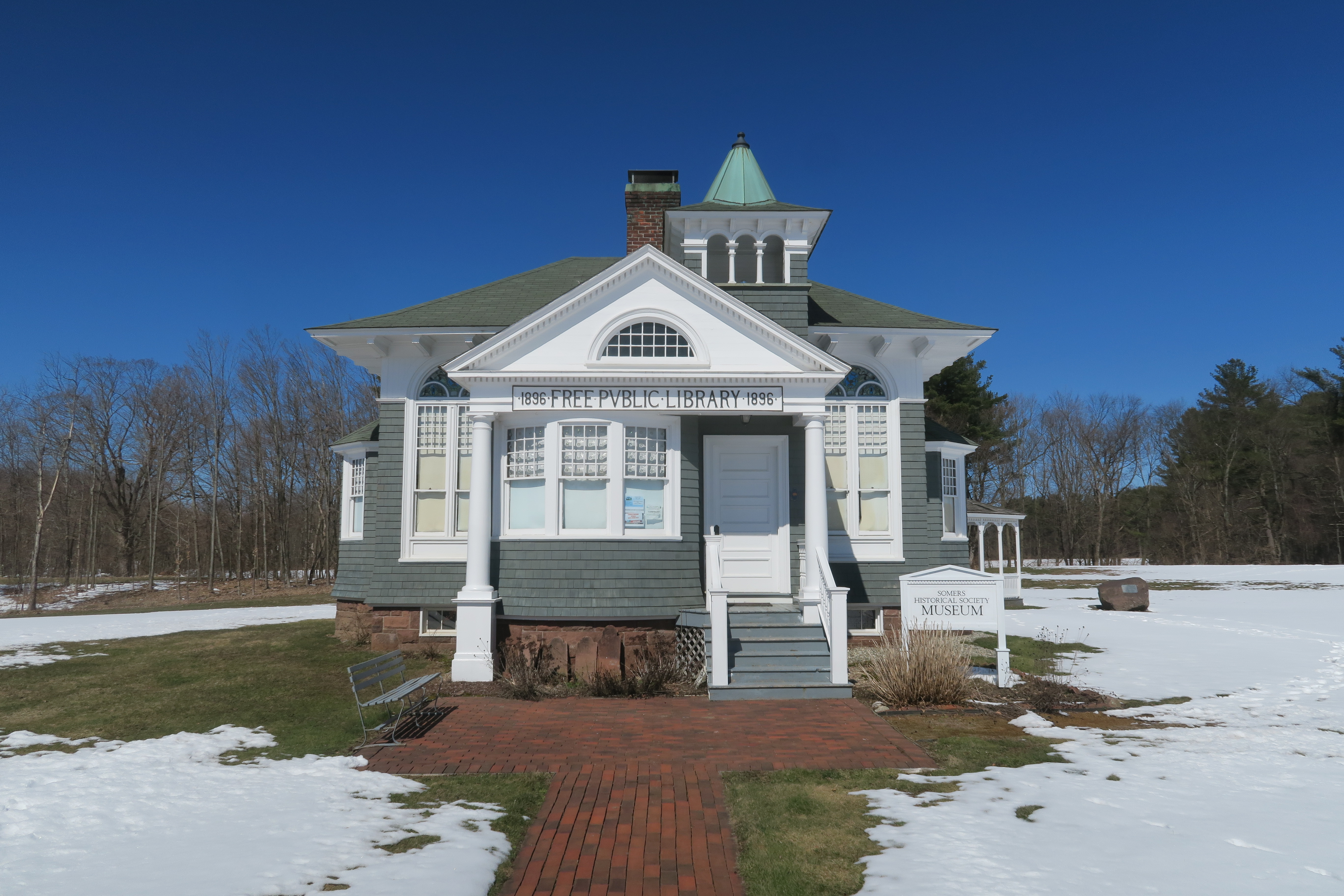
- Free Public Library

- Seal

- Coordinates: 41°59′N 72°27′W
- Country: United States
- U.S. state: Connecticut
- County: Tolland
- Region: Capitol Region
- Settled: 1689
- Named: 1734
- Annexed by Connecticut: 1749

Government
  - Type: Selectman-town meeting
  - First selectman: Timothy Keeney (R)
  - Selectman: William Meier III (R)
  - Selectman: Robert Schmidt (D)

Area
  - Total: 28.5 sq mi (73.8 km^{2})
  - Land: 28.3 sq mi (73.4 km^{2})
  - Water: 0.12 sq mi (0.3 km^{2})
- Elevation: 240 ft (73 m)

Population (2020)
  - Total: 10,255
  - Density: 362/sq mi (140/km^{2})
- Time zone: UTC-5 (Eastern)
  - Summer (DST): UTC-4 (Eastern)
- ZIP Code: 06071
- Area codes: 860/959
- FIPS code: 09-69220
- GNIS feature ID: 0212346
- Website: www.somersct.gov

Somers (/ˈsʌmərs/ SUM-ərss) is a town in Tolland County, Connecticut, United States. The town is part of the Capitol Planning Region. The population was 10,255 at the 2020 census. The town center is listed by the U.S. Census Bureau as a census-designated place (CDP). In 2007, Money Magazine listed Somers 53rd on its "100 Best Places to Live", based on "economic opportunity, good schools, safe streets, things to do and a real sense of community."

Bordering Massachusetts, Somers is considered part of the city of Springfield NECTA. Somers is 13 miles (21 km) southeast of Springfield and considered more oriented toward it than the city of Hartford, which lies 22 miles (35 km) to the southwest.

== History ==
Somers was originally part of the Agawam Plantation in the 17th century. Agawam Plantation became Springfield, Massachusetts, in 1641 and in 1682, the Enfield Parish broke off from the Springfield settlement. In 1689, the first settler, Benjamin Jones, came to Somers in what was then East Enfield about a half mile from the current town center, it was only a summer house and in the winter, he and his family returned to Enfield. In 1711, several more families settled the Somers area to help start a village. The families of Kibbe, Pease, Root, and Megregory were the first to settle the area. The Village was given the name Wallop but was changed to East Enfield shortly after. In the year 1734, East Enfield became a town and was renamed Somers, after John Somers, 1st Baron Somers. In the year 1749, Somers joined the Connecticut Colony.

The Four Town Fair, which is usually held after the third weekend in September, is one of the oldest fairs in the country.

Little Sorrel, the favorite horse of Confederate general Stonewall Jackson, was born at a farm in Somers.

== Geography ==
Somers is at 41°59′N 72°27′W.

According to the United States Census Bureau, the town has a total area of 28.5 square miles (74 km^{2}), of which 28.3 square miles (73 km^{2}) is land and 0.1 square miles (0.26 km^{2}) (0.49%) is water. The town center CDP has a total area of 2.1 square miles (5.4 km^{2}), all land.

The town's highest point, Bald Mountain, at 1,121 feet (342 m) is the highest point along the Connecticut River Valley in Connecticut. The rounded hill summit was recently purchased by the town and can be seen for many miles around.

=== Neighborhoods ===
- Somers Center, location of Somers Historic District
- Somersville
- North Somers
- Hall Hill
- Gulf Road
- Billings Road
- Woodcrest Village
- Osborn Place

== Demographics ==
Historical population
| Census | Pop. | Note | %± |
|---|---|---|---|
| 1820 | 1,306 | | — |
| 1850 | 1,508 | | — |
| 1860 | 1,517 | | 0.6% |
| 1870 | 1,247 | | −17.8% |
| 1880 | 1,242 | | −0.4% |
| 1890 | 1,407 | | 13.3% |
| 1900 | 1,593 | | 13.2% |
| 1910 | 1,653 | | 3.8% |
| 1920 | 1,673 | | 1.2% |
| 1930 | 1,917 | | 14.6% |
| 1940 | 2,114 | | 10.3% |
| 1950 | 2,631 | | 24.5% |
| 1960 | 3,702 | | 40.7% |
| 1970 | 6,893 | | 86.2% |
| 1980 | 8,473 | | 22.9% |
| 1990 | 9,108 | | 7.5% |
| 2000 | 10,417 | | 14.4% |
| 2010 | 11,444 | | 9.9% |
| 2020 | 10,255 | | −10.4% |
U.S. Decennial Census

As of the census of 2000, there were 10,417 people, 2,925 households, and 2,337 families living in the town. The population density was 367.6 inhabitants per square mile (141.9/km^{2}). There were 3,012 housing units at an average density of 106.3 per square mile (41.0/km^{2}). The racial makeup of the town was 82.97% White, 9.82% African American, 0.55% Native American, 0.62% Asian, 0.06% Pacific Islander, 4.00% from other races, and 1.98% from two or more races. Hispanic or Latino of any race were 8.10% of the population.

There were 2,925 households, out of which 37.0% had children under the age of 18 living with them, 70.4% were married couples living together, 6.7% had a female householder with no husband present, and 20.1% were non-families. 16.0% of all households were made up of individuals, and 8.4% had someone living alone who was 65 years of age or older. The average household size was 2.78 and the average family size was 3.11.

The age distribution was 20.8% under the age of 18, 9.4% from 18 to 24, 35.6% from 25 to 44, 24.0% from 45 to 64, and 10.1% who were 65 years of age or older. The median age was 37 years. For every 100 females, there were 154.6 males. For every 100 females age 18 and over, there were 171.0 males.

The median income for a household in the town was $65,273, and the median income for a family was $71,757. Males had a median income of $49,766 versus $35,329 for females. The per capita income for the town was $23,952. About 3.7% of families and 4.6% of the population were below the poverty line, including 3.3% of those under age 18 and 3.8% of those age 65 or over.

=== Town center ===
As of the census of 2000, there were 1,626 people, 628 households, and 457 families living in the town center CDP. The population density was 777.3 inhabitants per square mile (300.1/km^{2}). There were 645 housing units at an average density of 308.3 per square mile (119.0/km^{2}). The racial makeup of the CDP was 98.15% White, 0.18% African American, 0.55% Asian, 0.06% Pacific Islander, 0.12% from other races, and 0.92% from two or more races. Hispanic or Latino of any race were 1.05% of the population.

There were 628 households, out of which 31.1% had children under the age of 18 living with them, 63.2% were married couples living together, 7.3% had a female householder with no husband present, and 27.2% were non-families. 23.7% of all households were made up of individuals, and 14.8% had someone living alone who was 65 years of age or older. The average household size was 2.59 and the average family size was 3.05.

The town center CDP age distribution was 24.3% under the age of 18, 5.6% from 18 to 24, 26.9% from 25 to 44, 26.4% from 45 to 64, and 16.8% who were 65 years of age or older. The median age was 41 years. For every 100 females, there were 96.1 males. For every 100 females age 18 and over, there were 89.7 males.

The median income for a household in the CDP was $54,625, and the median income for a family was $64,107. Males had a median income of $45,893 versus $31,736 for females. The per capita income for the CDP was $24,874. About 4.0% of families and 6.8% of the population were below the poverty line, including 11.1% of those under age 18 and 7.5% of those age 65 or over.

== Government and infrastructure ==
Two Connecticut Department of Corrections prisons, Northern Correctional Institution and Osborn Correctional Institution, are in Somers. Northern housed the state's death row for men. Osborn housed the state's execution chamber.

=== Education ===
The Town of Somers is served by three schools, all located within the Somers Public School District. Somers Elementary School serves grades Pre-K through 5, named CAS 2025 Elementary School of the Year, Mabelle B. Avery Middle School, named CAS 2024 Middle School of the Year, serves grades 6 through 8, and Somers High School serves grades 9 through 12. The district also houses the town's public library.

=== Recreation ===
The Town of Somers maintains several recreation facilities, the largest being the facility on Field Road which features a pavilion, playscape, tennis courts and ball fields. The Shenipsit State Forest along with the Shenipsit Trail is also partially in Somers, along with Soapstone Mountain, the highest point in the state forest. The Scantic River State Park is also partially in Somers. The Northern Connecticut Land Trust also has several properties in town.

== Notable people ==
- George Abbe (1911–1989), poet and winner of Shelley Memorial Award
- S. Prestley Blake (1914–2021), long time resident, co-founder of the Friendly's restaurant chain
- William O. Collins (1809–1881), American Attorney General, Civil War general
- Christopher Houlihan (born 1987), professional organist
- Claire Labine (1934–2016), writer and producer
- Gene Pitney (1940–2006), internationally famous singer/composer, Rock and Roll Hall of Fame member, was a longtime resident of Somers
- William Strong (1808–1895), U.S. Representative from Pennsylvania and Associate Justice of the Supreme Court of the United States was born in Somers
- Loren P. Waldo (1802–1881), U.S. Representative
- Hannah Soar (born 1999), American freestyle skier
