= Stafford, Connecticut =

- Town
- Town of Stafford
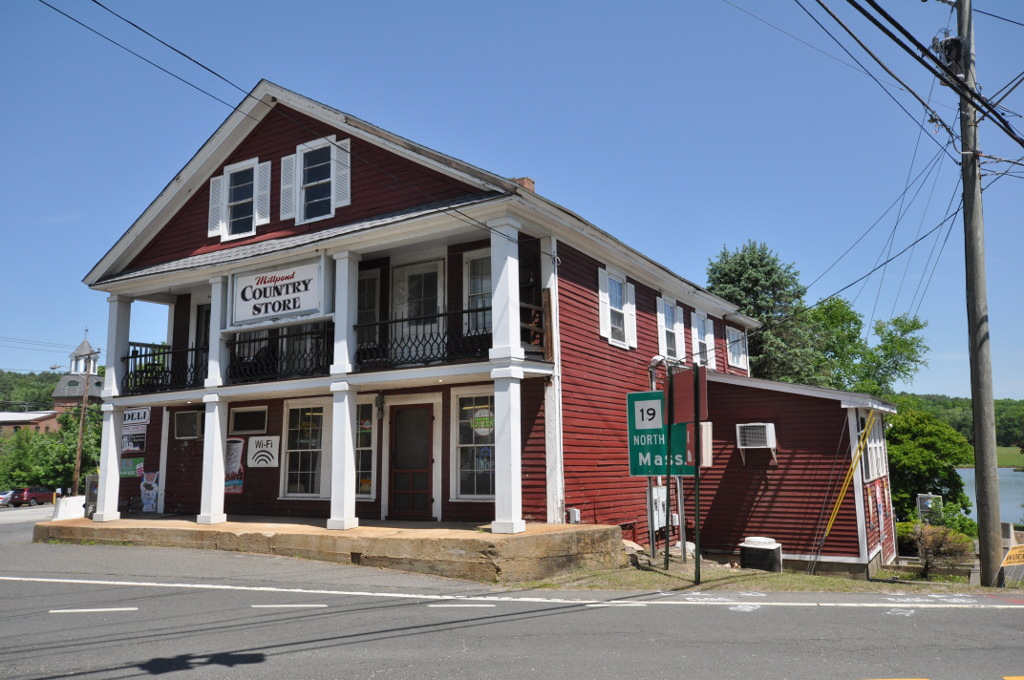
- Mill Pond Country Store in Stafford Hollow Historic District

- Flag Seal

- Coordinates: 41°59′N 72°19′W
- Country: United States
- U.S. state: Connecticut
- County: Tolland
- Region: Capitol Region
- Settled: 1719

Government
  - Type: Selectman-town meeting
  - First Selectman: William "Bill" Morrison (D)
  - Selectman: Anthony Armelin
  - Selectman: Timothy N. Cromwell

Area
  - Total: 58.8 sq mi (152.2 km^{2})
  - Land: 58.0 sq mi (150.2 km^{2})
  - Water: 0.81 sq mi (2.1 km^{2})
- Elevation: 627 ft (191 m)

Population (2020)
  - Total: 11,472
  - Density: 197.8/sq mi (76.38/km^{2})
- Time zone: UTC−5 (Eastern)
  - Summer (DST): UTC−4 (Eastern)
- ZIP Code: 06076
- Area codes: 860/959
- FIPS code: 09-72090
- GNIS feature ID: 0212349
- Website: staffordct.org

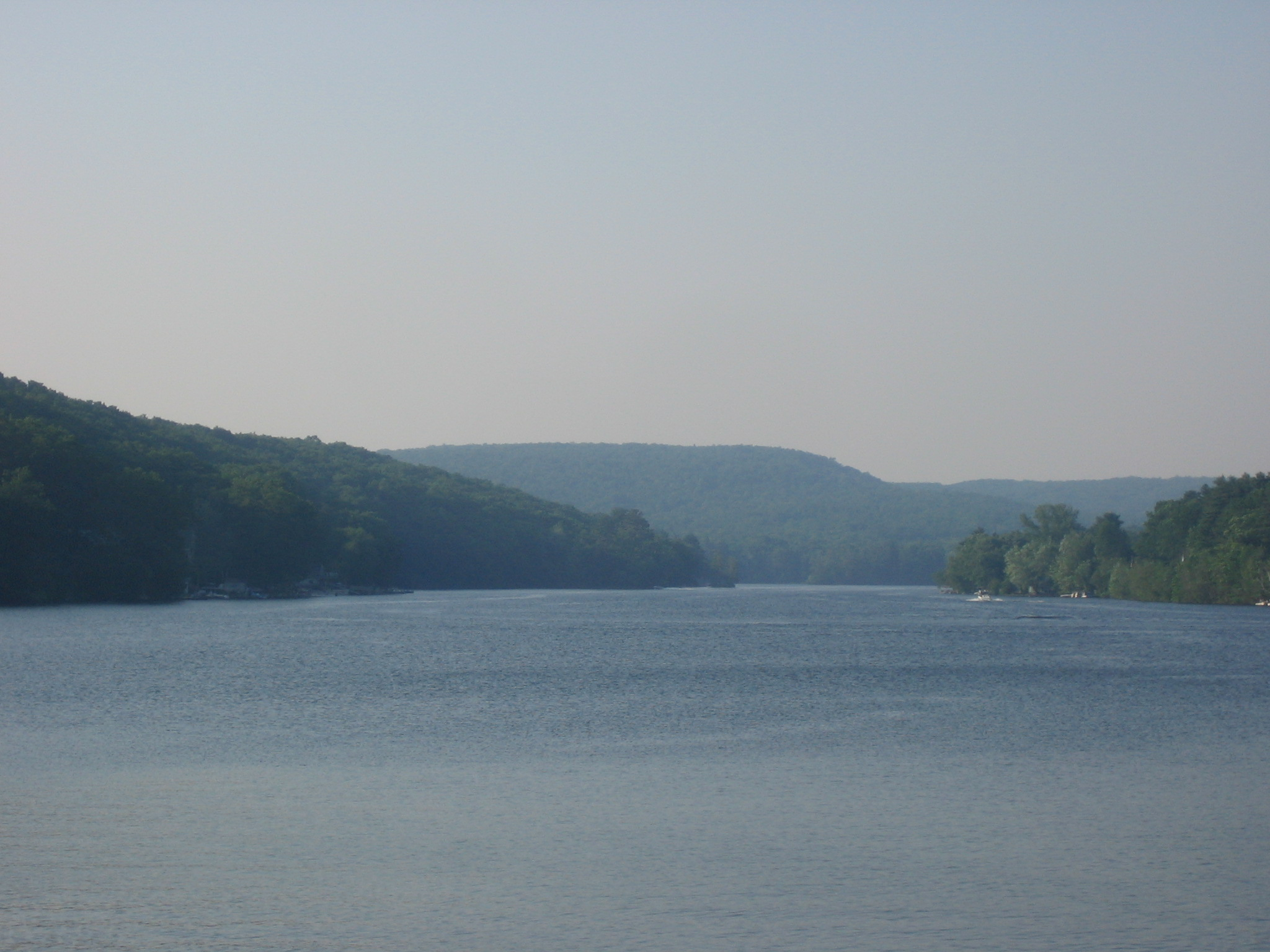
Staffordville Lake

Stafford is a town in Tolland County, Connecticut, United States, settled in 1719. The town is part of the Capitol Planning Region. The population was 11,472 at the 2020 United States census.

== Etymology ==
The town most likely derives its name from Staffordshire, in England.

== History ==
The Colonial Town of Stafford began as a rural agricultural community in the eastern part of Hartford County. It became part of Tolland County upon the latter's formation on 13 October 1785. The easy availability of water power from the tributaries of the Willimantic River led to industrialization, and this abundance of power helped generate local population growth. By the mid-19th century, Stafford was connected by railroad to markets across New England, and before the State Highway projects of the 1920s and 1930s, the town had a trolley connection to Rockville.

During the Civil War, factories in Stafford made cannonballs and other war supplies for the northern forces.

== Geography ==
According to the United States Census Bureau, the town has a total area of 58.8 sq mi (152.2 km^{2}), of which 58.0 sq mi (150.1 km^{2}) is land and 0.81 sq mi (2.1 km^{2}) (1.38%) is water; it is the fourth largest town in Connecticut based on area.

Stafford Springs is located at the intersection of Routes 190 and 32, in the northeastern region of the state.

While the town has managed to maintain its New England mill-town charm and culture, it is also a bedroom commuter town feeding into larger area communities. Many residents drive into Hartford, Manchester, and Enfield, Connecticut, as well as Springfield, Massachusetts, all of which can be reached in roughly a 30-mile auto commute. It is also about a half-hour drive to the University of Connecticut's main campus in Storrs.

The highest point in town is the western slope of Burley Hill at 1,300'. Burley Hill's "summit" is 1,315'.

=== Populated places ===
The community consists of the downtown area of Stafford Springs and the more rural villages of Crystal Lake, Ellithorpe, Hydeville, Orcuttsville, Staffordville, Stafford Hollow, Village Hill, and West Stafford.

== Demographics ==
Historical population
Census	Pop.	Note	%±
1820	2,269		—
1850	2,940		—
1860	3,397		15.5%
1870	3,405		0.2%
1880	4,455		30.8%
1890	4,535		1.8%
1900	4,297		−5.2%
1910	5,233		21.8%
1920	5,407		3.3%
1930	5,949		10.0%
1940	5,835		−1.9%
1950	6,471		10.9%
1960	7,476		15.5%
1970	8,680		16.1%
1980	9,268		6.8%
1990	11,091		19.7%
2000	11,307		1.9%
2010	12,087		6.9%
2020	11,472		−5.1%
U.S. Decennial Census

In 2011, there were 12,192 people, 4,819 households, and 3,086 families residing in the town. The population density was 210.2 inhabitants per square mile (81.2/km^{2}). There were 4,956 housing units at an average density of 85.4 per square mile (33.0/km^{2}). The racial makeup of the town was 95.51% White, 0.69% African American, 0.16% Native American, 1.10% Asian, and 2.53% from other races or from two or more races. Hispanic or Latino of any race were 3.04% of the population.

In 2019, there were 11,893 people and 4,707 households residing in the town. The population density was 208.3 inhabitants per square mile (80.4/km^{2}). The racial makeup of the town was 94.7% White, 0.9% Black or African American, 0.1% American Indian and Alaska Native, 1.0% Asian, 0.0% Native Hawaiian and Other Pacific Islander, 3.0% Two or More Races, 3.5% Hispanic or Latino, 92.4% White alone, not Hispanic or Latino.

The age population was evenly spread out, with 18.2% under the age of 18, 64.4% from 18 to 64, and 17.4% who were 65 years of age or older. For every 100 females, there were 93.1 males.

The median income for a household in the town was $74,386. The per capita income for the town was $37,359. About 6.2% of the population was below the poverty line.

Most of the town's population is located in seven villages, with nearly half in Stafford Springs. The rest of the town, particularly the northern third, is rural and forested.

== Education ==
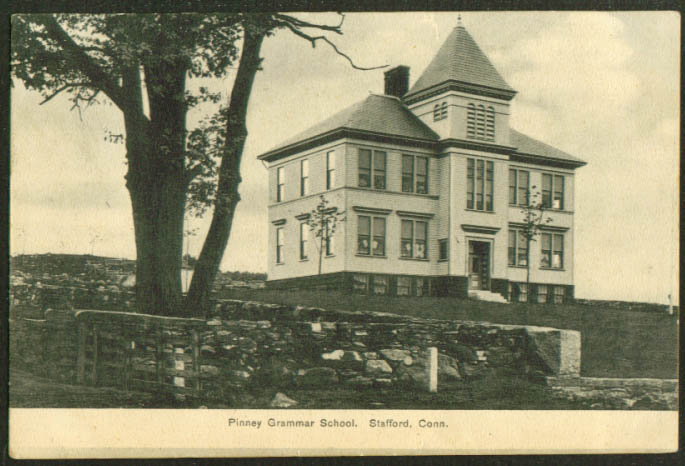
Pinney Grammar School, c. 1909

At the present time there are one primary, one elementary, one middle and one high school in Stafford.

The primary school, West Stafford, serves children in Pre-K and kindergarten. Stafford Elementary school serves children in grades one through five. The middle school is for grades 6–8, and the high school is grades 9–12.

Stafford High School fields competitive teams in football, basketball, cross country, track, soccer, field hockey, baseball and softball and in more recent years wrestling, as well as offering an active intramural sports program. Each spring the music, arts, and drama departments of the high and middle schools put on plays and musical productions. A variety of extracurricular activities rounds out the school program.

== Medical ==
Johnson Memorial Medical Center is a 90-bed acute care facility, located on Route 190 in Stafford, The Hospital offers inpatient and outpatient services, including medical and surgical, obstetrics and gynecology, pediatrics, mental health, intensive/coronary care, oncology, physical rehabilitation and emergency care. The facility was built in 1975. It has an adjoining professional building which houses the practices of area doctors.

Evergreen Health Care Center opened in 1989, is a nursing facility located on the hospital campus consisting of 120 long term care beds and a 30-bed sub-acute rehabilitation unit and a 30-bed Memory Support Unit for residents with Alzheimer's disease. Evergreen and JMH serve several area towns.

Family Birth Suites at the Nirenberg Center is a state of the art birthing center featuring six private birthing suites designed to accommodate patients throughout their stay, for labor, delivery, recovery, and postpartum care.

Evergreen, JMH, and the Nirenberg Center serve several area towns.

Stafford hosts offices of a number of physicians, dentists, optometrists, chiropractors, physical therapists and other health professionals. The Stafford Veterinary Center serves the needs of large and small animals.

== Recreation ==
The town has several tennis courts, ball fields, soccer fields, and several parks. In addition, there are private hunting and fishing clubs, as well as recreational swimming and tennis clubs. During the spring and summer there is an active Little League program, youth softball, adult softball for men and women, and a summer recreational program offering swimming lessons and martial arts instruction for children. There are programs for youth football, basketball, soccer and hockey.

The Stafford Motor Speedway attracts tens of thousands of spectators every year and is a fixture of spring and summer. There is a small public beach on Staffordville Lake which is a summertime destination for many residents. Stafford also has (limited) access to Sandy Beach on Crystal Lake in Ellington. Plans are being developed to provide hiking and multi-use trails within Stafford. There are two bed and breakfasts as well as a few campgrounds (Sun Valley, Roaring Brook and Mineral Springs) that provide accommodation for visitors.

== Government ==
Stafford is governed by a three-member Board of Selectmen, elected by voters in odd-numbered years for two-year terms. The Town has no charter but is governed under the general statutes of the State of Connecticut, and under ordinances specific to the Town which have been adopted by popular vote at town meetings.

Stafford is served by the Connecticut State Police through the Resident State Trooper program. The town has both CSP Uniformed troopers, as well as Stafford uniformed officers. The barracks of Troop C of the State Police are located nearby, just off Interstate Highway 84 in Tolland. Full-time and part-time constables also serve with resident troopers.

Two volunteer fire departments cover Stafford with strategically located firehouses (West Stafford Fire, Stafford Fire #1). The Stafford Fire Department has two locations, one in the Staffordville district (Station 145) and the second in the Stafford Springs District (Station 245). The Town also has a volunteer ambulance organization which serves the area.

The Stafford Public Library continually offers public service programs and special events for the community.

A modern sewer plant, constructed in 1972, serves about a third of the Town; the commercial and industrial areas of the Town lie largely in the Service District. Curbside pick-up of municipal refuse and recyclable materials is available within the Stafford Springs Service District.

In the Connecticut General Assembly, Stafford is represented by State Representative Kurt Vail and State Senator Jeff Gordon.

== Notable people ==
- Alvin Alden (1818–1882), Wisconsin state legislator; born in town
- Jack Arute (born 1950), sports commentator and president Stafford Motor Speedway
- Penny Bacchiochi (born c. 1961), former Connecticut House of Representatives legislator; raised in town
- Matt Bessette (born 1984), American mixed martial artist
- John Buckley (1885–1959), Connecticut state legislator and US district attorney; born in town
- Ernest Cady (1842–1908), 45th Lieutenant Governor of Connecticut
- Attilio R. Frassinelli (1907–1976), 78th Lieutenant Governor of Connecticut from 1967 to 1971
- Moses G. Leonard (1809–1899), US Congressman for New York; born in town
- Charles Lewandoski (born 1985), former NASCAR driver
- Erasmus D. Peck (1808–1876), US Congressman for Ohio; born in town

== Climate ==
Climate data for Stafford Springs, Connecticut
Month	Jan	Feb	Mar	Apr	May	Jun	Jul	Aug	Sep	Oct	Nov	Dec	Year
Record high °F (°C)	66 (19)	70 (21)	81 (27)	93 (34)	95 (35)	95 (35)	100 (38)	99 (37)	93 (34)	84 (29)	79 (26)	72 (22)	100 (38)
Mean daily maximum °F (°C)	34 (1)	37 (3)	46 (8)	57 (14)	68 (20)	77 (25)	81 (27)	79 (26)	75 (24)	61 (16)	49 (9)	39 (4)	58 (14)
Mean daily minimum °F (°C)	15 (−9)	15 (−9)	23 (−5)	34 (1)	45 (7)	54 (12)	58 (14)	57 (14)	50 (10)	38 (3)	26 (−3)	21 (−6)	37 (3)
Record low °F (°C)	−20 (−29)	−17 (−27)	−8 (−22)	−4 (−20)	19 (−7)	28 (−2)	37 (3)	32 (0)	25 (−4)	14 (−10)	−3 (−19)	−15 (−26)	−20 (−29)
Average precipitation inches (mm)	3.47 (88)	3.15 (80)	4.13 (105)	3.96 (101)	3.52 (89)	4.20 (107)	4.12 (105)	4.29 (109)	3.92 (100)	4.77 (121)	3.84 (98)	4.04 (103)	47.40 (1,204)
Average snowfall inches (cm)	16.6 (42)	14.7 (37)	11.0 (28)	2.8 (7.1)	0 (0)	0 (0)	0 (0)	0 (0)	0 (0)	0.6 (1.5)	2.9 (7.4)	11.6 (29)	60.2 (153)
Source: NCDC - Stafford Springs COOP Record
