= Connecticut Route 191 =

State highway in Hartford County, Connecticut, US

Route 191
- Map of Hartford County in northern Connecticut with Route 191 highlighted in red

Route information
- Maintained by CTDOT
- Length: 9.30 mi (14.97 km)
- Existed: 1932–present

Major junctions
- South end: US 5 in East Windsor
- North end: Route 190 in Enfield

Location
- Country: United States
- State: Connecticut
- Counties: Hartford

Highway system
- Connecticut State Highway System; Interstate; US; State; SSR; SR; Scenic
← Route 190	→ Route 192

Route 191 is a state highway in northern Connecticut, running from East Windsor to Enfield.

== Route description ==
Route 191 begins as Phelps Road at an intersection with US 5 in the town of East Windsor. It heads east through the village of Scantic, turning onto Scantic Road. It continues across the Scantic River, then northeast along the river following Mill Street to the village of Broad Brook, where it then turns northward along Main Street. Route 140 joins Main Street from the west about 0.8 miles (1.3 km) later, then after overlapping Route 140 into the village of Melrose, Route 191 continues north along Broad Brook Road into the town of Enfield. Route 191 runs for another three miles (5 km) in eastern Enfield until it ends at an intersection with Route 190 in the village of Scitico.

== History ==
The Melrose to Scitico route was designated as a state highway in 1922 and was known as Highway 208. In 1932, old Highway 208 was renumbered to Route 191, running from Route 140 in Melrose to the current northern terminus in Scitico. In 1941, it was extended west along the current route of Route 140 to US 5 in Warehouse Point. In 1962, as part of a series of realignments triggered by the opening of the Bradley Airport Connector, the western section of Route 140 and the southern section of Route 191 were exchanged. At the same time, Route 191 was extended north to the Massachusetts state line along Taylor Road and modern Route 220. However, this northern extension was reversed by the following year.

== Junction list ==
The entire route is in Hartford County.

Location	mi	km	Destinations	Notes
East Windsor	0.00	0.00	US 5 – Enfield, South Windsor	Southern terminus
East Windsor	4.59	7.39	Route 140 west – Warehouse Point	Southern end of Route 140 concurrency
East Windsor	5.83	9.38	Route 140 east – Ellington	Northern end of Route 140 concurrency
Enfield	9.30	14.97	Route 190 – Suffield, Somers	Northern terminus
1.000 mi = 1.609 km; 1.000 km = 0.621 mi: Concurrency terminus
