= Connecticut's 57th House of Representatives district =

District in the Connecticut state legislature

Connecticut's 57th State House of Representatives district
Representative
| Jaime Foster; D |

Connecticut's 57th House of Representatives district elects one member of the Connecticut House of Representatives. It consists of the town of Ellington and part of East Windsor and has been represented by Democrat Jaime Foster since 2021.

== List of representatives ==
List of Representatives from Connecticut's 57th State House District
| Representative | Party | Years | District home | Note |
|---|---|---|---|---|
| Richard A. Gosselin | Democratic | 1967–1973 | Plainfield | Seat created |
| Danel L. McKeever | Republican | 1973–1975 | Ellington | |
| Teresalee Bertinuson | Democratic | 1975–1991 | Melrose | |
| Edward C. Graziani | Democratic | 1991–1999 | Ellington | |
| Ted Graziani | Democratic | 1999–2011 | Ellington | |
| Christopher Davis | Republican | 2011–2021 | Ellington | |
| Jaime Foster | Democratic | 2021– | Ellington | |

== Recent elections ==
=== 2020 ===
2020 Connecticut State House of Representatives election, District 57
| Party | Candidate | Votes | % |
|---|---|---|---|
| Republican | David E. Stavens | 6,346 | 48.29 |
| Democratic | Jaime Foster | 6,191 | 47.11 |
| Independent Party | Jaime Foster | 326 | 2.48 |
| Working Families | Jaime Foster | 278 | 2.12 |
| Total votes | | 13,141 | 100.00 |
| Democratic gain from Republican | | | |

=== 2018 ===
2018 Connecticut House of Representatives election, District 57
| Party | Candidate | Votes | % |
|---|---|---|---|
| Republican | Christopher Davis (Incumbent) | 6,538 | 62.2 |
| Democratic | Dennis Milanovich | 3,978 | 37.8 |
| Total votes | | 10,516 | 100.00 |
| Republican hold | | | |

=== 2016 ===
2016 Connecticut House of Representatives election, District 57
| Party | Candidate | Votes | % |
|---|---|---|---|
| Republican | Christopher Davis (Incumbent) | 9,048 | 100.00 |
| Total votes | | 9,048 | 100.00 |
| Republican hold | | | |

=== 2014 ===
2018 Connecticut House of Representatives election, District 57
| Party | Candidate | Votes | % |
|---|---|---|---|
| Republican | Christopher Davis (Incumbent) | 5,358 | 65.5 |
| Democratic | Noele Kidney | 2,819 | 34.5 |
| Total votes | | 8,177 | 100.00 |
| Republican hold | | | |

=== 2012 ===
2012 Connecticut House of Representatives election, District 57
| Party | Candidate | Votes | % |
|---|---|---|---|
| Republican | Christopher Davis (Incumbent) | 5,630 | 52.8 |
| Democratic | Jason E. Bowza | 5,035 | 47.5 |
| Total votes | | 10,665 | 100.00 |
| Republican hold | | | |
