= Broad Brook (disambiguation) =

Broad Brook, Connecticut is a census-designated place in East Windsor, Connecticut, US.

Broad Brook may also refer to:

- Broad Brook Company, a defunct textiles plant in East Windsor, Connecticut, listed on the National Register of Historic Places (NRHP)
- Broad Brook Canal, a water-supply canal in Ludlow, Massachusetts, US
- Broad Brook House, a tavern house in Guilford, Vermont; NRHP-listed
