= Route 83 (Connecticut–Massachusetts) =

Highway in Connecticut and Massachusetts

Route 83
- Map of northern Connecticut and southern Massachusetts with CT 83 in solid red and MA 83 in dotted red

Route information
- Maintained by CTDOT
- Length: 35.65 mi (57.37 km) Connecticut: 27.56 mi Massachusetts: 8.09 mi
- Existed: 1932–present

Major junctions
- South end: New London Turnpike in Glastonbury, CT
- I-384 in Manchester, CT; US 6 / US 44 in Manchester, CT; I-84 / Route 30 in Manchester, CT and Vernon, CT; Route 74 in Vernon, CT; Route 190 in Somers, CT
- North end: I-91 / US 5 in Springfield, MA

Location
- Country: United States
- States: Connecticut, Massachusetts
- Counties: CT: Hartford, Tolland, MA: Hampden

Highway system
- Connecticut State Highway System; Interstate; US; State; SSR; SR; Scenic
← Route 82	→ I-84
← Route 81	MA	→ I-84

Route 83 is a 35.65-mile-long (57.37 km) north–south state highway in the Greater Hartford and Greater Springfield areas of the U.S. states of Connecticut and Massachusetts. It serves as the main north–south artery for the towns of Manchester, Vernon, Ellington, and Somers, and continues through East Longmeadow center into downtown Springfield. The route in Massachusetts is town-maintained, except for the ramps connecting to U.S. Route 5 parallel to Interstate 91.

== Route description ==
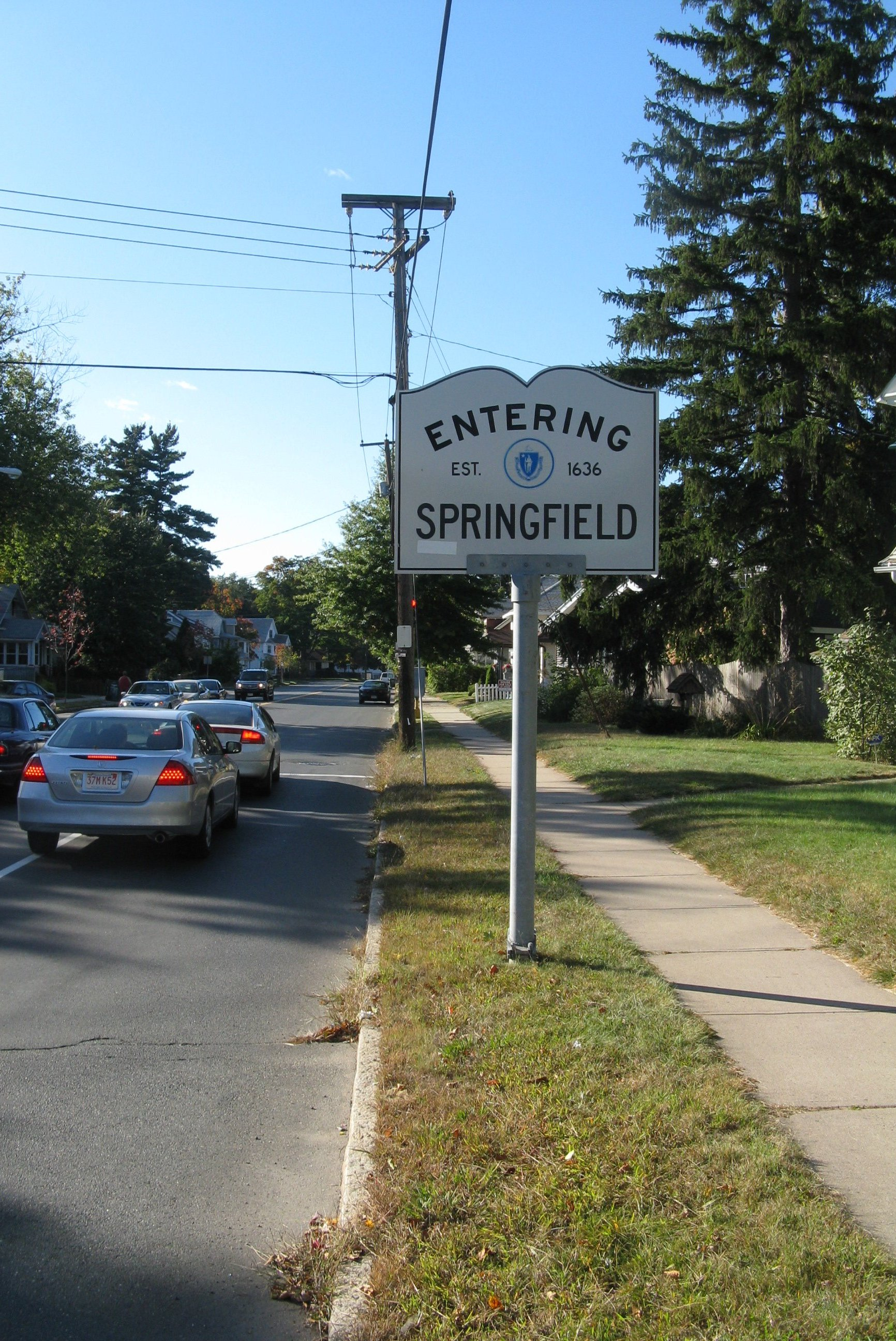
Northbound entering Springfield, Massachusetts

Route 83 begins at the southern end of New London Turnpike in Glastonbury near its junction with Route 2 at exit 10. After crossing Route 2, it then heads north and crosses Route 94 before entering Manchester, where it serves as the main north–south thoroughfare of the town. Just before the center of town, it intersects I-384 at exit 3. Within the town center of Manchester, a 0.77-mile (1.24 km) segment is town maintained between Hartford Road and Center Street, the latter of which carries US 6/44, the town's main east–west thoroughfare. It then continues north, and comes to a junction with Route 30 at I-84 exit 63. Route 83 overlaps with Route 30 for 1.50 miles (2.41 km) from Manchester into Vernon, intersecting I-84 once again at exit 64 before Route 30 turns off to the east. It then continues north in Vernon as a 4-lane road where it narrows to 2 lanes shortly before a 0.81 mile overlap with Route 74. It then turns north once again on the western edge of Rockville Center, and crosses into Ellington, where it has junctions with the northern end of Route 286, and with Route 140 in the center of town. It then continues north into Somers, where it has a brief (0.02 mile) overlap with Route 190. Route 83 continues northwest, and crosses the Massachusetts state line into East Longmeadow.

In East Longmeadow, it proceeds north as Somers Road until a complex seven-way intersection (the East Longmeadow Rotary) that involves Route 186 and Route 220 among other roads. Beyond the Rotary, Route 83 continues northwest through East Longmeadow along North Main Street. After entering the city of Springfield, Route 83 shifts onto Belmont Avenue until it reaches a six-way intersection (known as "the X") where the route shifts again to Sumner Avenue. Route 83 follows Sumner Avenue to its end then turns south on Longhill Street, before becoming a short divided highway providing access to the ramps leading to I-91 and US 5.

== History ==
In the 1920s, the segment from Glastonbury to Manchester was called State Highway 164, while the segment from Manchester to Somers was called State Highway 108. The current Route 83 was established from these two state highways in the 1932 renumbering. At about the same time, Massachusetts extended the route through East Longmeadow and Springfield as a town-maintained road. In Connecticut, the only significant changes since then have been the straightening of a few curves. In Massachusetts, the construction of I-91 and relocation of US 5 led to the realignment of the northern end of Route 83 to its modern route along the I-91 ramps.

== Major intersections ==
State	County	Location	mi	km	Destinations	Notes
Connecticut	Hartford	Glastonbury	0.00	0.00	New London Turnpike – South Glastonbury	Southern terminus
Connecticut	Hartford	Glastonbury	0.15	0.24	Route 2 – Norwich, Hartford	Exit 10 on Route 2
Connecticut	Hartford	Glastonbury	2.77	4.46	Route 94 – Glastonbury, Hebron, Lebanon	
Connecticut	Hartford	Manchester	6.61	10.64	I-384 / Charter Oak Street (SR 534 east) – Hartford, Providence, RI	Exit 3 on I-384
Connecticut	Hartford	Manchester	7.53	12.12	US 6 / US 44 – Hartford, Willimantic	
Connecticut	Hartford	Manchester	10.14	16.32	I-84 / Route 30 south – South Windsor	Southern end of Route 30 concurrency; exit 63 on I-84; former I-86
Connecticut	Tolland	Vernon	11.44	18.41	I-84 west – Hartford	Exit 64 on I-84; former I-86
Connecticut	Tolland	Vernon	11.63	18.72	Route 30 north to I-84 east – Vernon Center	Northern end of Route 30 concurrency
Connecticut	Tolland	Vernon	14.58	23.46	Route 74 west – South Windsor	Southern end of Route 74 concurrency
Connecticut	Tolland	Vernon	15.39	24.77	Route 74 east – Rockville	Northern end of Route 74 concurrency
Connecticut	Tolland	Ellington	17.62	28.36	Route 286 south – Broad Brook	Northern terminus of Route 286; former Route 140
Connecticut	Tolland	Ellington	18.38	29.58	Route 140 – Crystal Lake, Ellington, Bradley International Airport	Former Route 140A
Connecticut	Tolland	Somers	23.80	38.30	Route 190 – Enfield, Somersville, West Stafford	
Connecticut–Massachusetts state line			27.56 0.00	44.35 0.00	Route transition	
Massachusetts	Hampden	East Longmeadow	4.50	7.24	Route 186 south / Route 220 south – Enfield, CT, Somersville, Hazardville, CT	5 Corners rotary; northern termini of Routes 186 and 220
Massachusetts	Hampden	Springfield	8.09	13.02	I-91 (US 5) – Holyoke, Greenfield, Hartford, CT	Northern terminus; exit 2 on I-91
1.000 mi = 1.609 km; 1.000 km = 0.621 mi: Concurrency terminus; Route transition
