= Teresalee Bertinuson =

American politician (1923–2005)

Member of the Connecticut House of Representatives from the 57th district
- In office 1975–1991
- Preceded by: Daniel L. McKeever
- Succeeded by: Edward C. Graziani

Personal details
- Born: Teresalee Downing; June 22, 1923 Wakefield, Massachusetts, U.S.
- Died: October 12, 2005 (aged 82)
- Party: Democratic
- Spouse: Torvald A. Bertinuson
- Children: 6
- Education: Emmanuel College; University of Denver

Teresalee Bertinuson (née Downing; June 22, 1923 – October 12, 2005) was an American politician who served in the Connecticut House of Representatives from 1975 to 1991, representing the 57th district as a Democrat.

== Personal life and education ==
Bertinuson was born Teresalee Downing on June 22, 1923, in Wakefield, Massachusetts. In 1943, she graduated from Emmanuel College with a degree in chemistry. She briefly worked as a chemist before enlisting in the U.S. Army, where she trained as a physical therapist and was commissioned as a second lieutenant.

In 1947, Bertinuson married Torvald A. Bertinuson, and together they had six daughters. In 1951, she and her husband graduated from the University of Denver with Master's degrees. In 1955, they moved to Melrose, Connecticut, a village in East Windsor.

Following Bertinuson's service in the Connecticut House of Representatives, she taught environmental courses at the University of Hartford and the University of Connecticut.

Bertinuson died on October 12, 2005. She was 82.

== Political career ==
Bertinuson entered Connecticut politics in 1958, when she became a member of the East Windsor Democratic Town Committee. She also served eight years on the East Windsor Board of Education and six years on its conservation commission.

Bertinuson was first elected to the Connecticut House of Representatives in 1974 and served for eight terms, representing the 57th district as a Democrat. There, she was a member of the education and environment committees, and much of her work focused on environmental issues, including recycling, groundwater pollution, and open space preservation. She also advocated for state funding to the Connecticut Trolley Museum, and due to her efforts, the state provided $1.3 million to construct the museum's main building. On May 22, 2005, in recognition of her work, the museum dedicated the building to her.

Bertinuson did not run for reelection to the House of Representatives in 1990, and she was succeeded by Edward C. Graziani.
