= Congregation Knesseth Israel (Ellington, Connecticut) =

Modern Orthodox synagogue in Connecticut, USA

- Hebrew: ק"ק כנסת ישראל
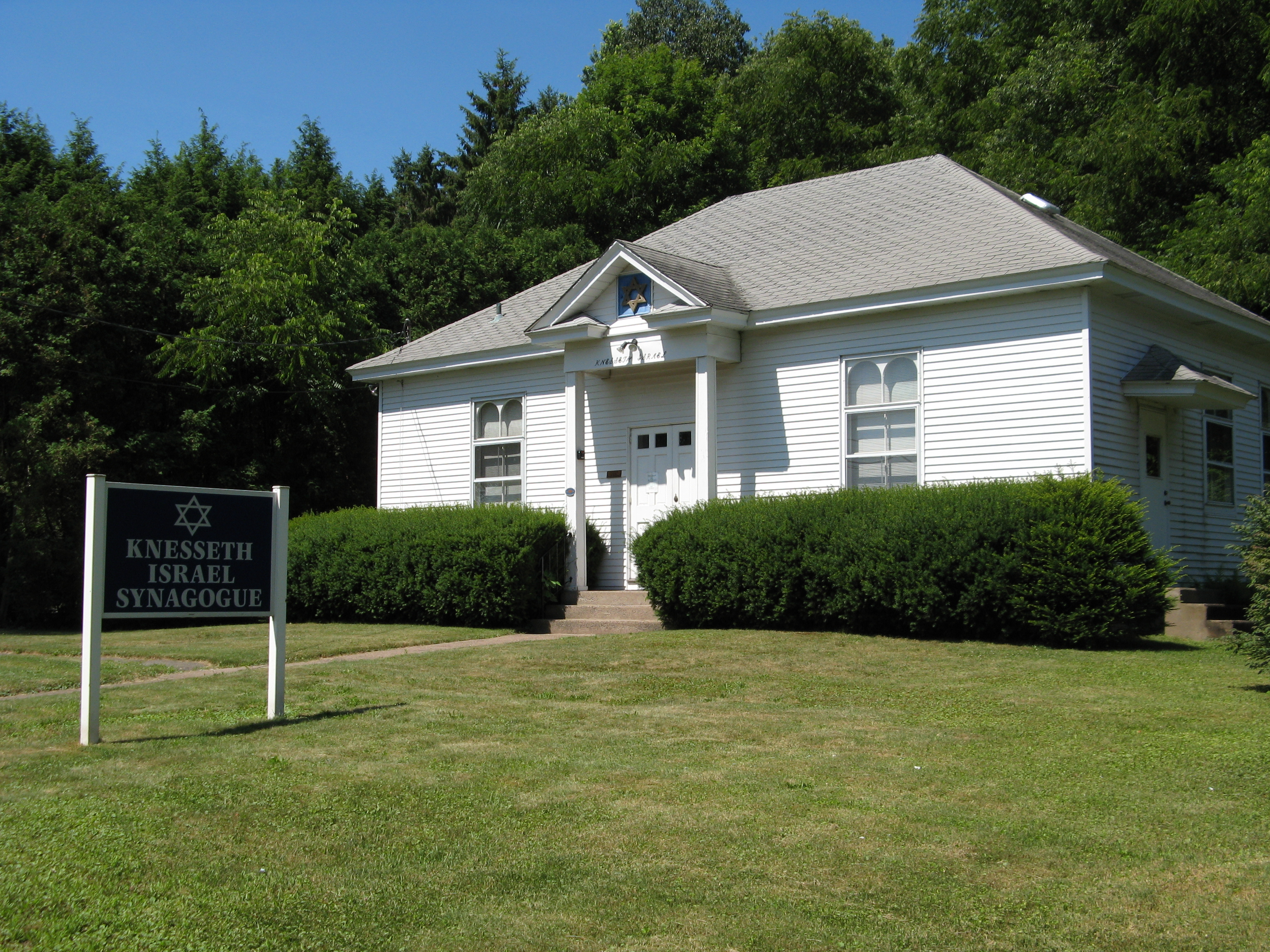
- The relocated synagogue building

- Location in Connecticut

Religion
- Affiliation: Modern Orthodox Judaism
- Rite: Ashkenazi
- Ecclesiastical or organisational status: Synagogue
- Year consecrated: 1906
- Status: Active

Location
- Location: 236 Pinney Street, Ellington, Connecticut
- Country: United States
- Coordinates: 41°53′51″N 72°28′47″W

Architecture
- Architect: Leon Dobkin
- Type: Synagogue
- Style: Colonial Revival
- Established: 1906 (as a congregation)
- Completed: 1913
- Construction cost: $1,500

Specifications
- Direction of façade: East
- Length: 30 feet (9.1 m)
- Width: 40 feet (12 m)
- Materials: Wood

Website
- ellingtonshul.org
- Congregation Knesseth Israel
- U.S. National Register of Historic Places
- NRHP reference No.: 95000862
- Added to NRHP: July 21, 1995

Congregation Knesseth Israel, also known as the Ellington Shul, is a Modern Orthodox Jewish congregation and synagogue located at 236 Pinney Street in Ellington, Connecticut, in the United States.

The congregation was founded in 1906 by a group of Yiddish-speaking Jewish farmers from Russia and Eastern Europe. Its building, dating to 1913, is a rare example of an early 20th-century rural synagogue in the state, and was listed on the National Register of Historic Places in 1995.

== Architecture and history ==
Knesseth Israel is located in what is now a rural-residential setting south of Ellington center, on the west side of Pinney Road (Connecticut Route 286) a short way north of its junction with Middle Road. It is a modest single-story wood-frame structure, with a hip roof and clapboarded exterior. Its main facade is three bays wide, with a center entrance sheltered by a gabled portico. The portico is supported by square posts, and has a Star of David in the gable. The flanking windows consist of a lower pair of sashes, and an upper transom with paired round arches applied. The interior of the building consists of one large chamber, with a bema that appears slightly oversized due to the building's small size. Because it is a single-story building, the segregated worship area for women (normally located in a second-floor gallery) is on the south side of the main space, separated by a low divider.

The synagogue was built in 1913, and was originally located at the corner of Middle Rd. and Abbott Rd. in Ellington. It was built in the Colonial Revival Style partly with funds from the philanthropist Baron Maurice de Hirsch's Jewish Colonization Association. In the 1954 the building was moved to its present location at 236 Pinney St. The building was designed by Leon Dobkin. The building was one of fifteen Connecticut synagogues added to the National Register of Historic Places in 1995 and 1996 in response to an unprecedented multiple submission, nominating nineteen synagogues.

In addition to the synagogue, the congregation maintains an Orthodox Jewish cemetery within the larger Ellington Cemetery.

== See also ==
- National Register of Historic Places listings in Tolland County, Connecticut
