= Ted Graziani =

American politician (born 1950)

Member of the Connecticut House of Representatives from the 57th district
- In office January 6, 1999 – January 5, 2011
- Preceded by: Edward C. Graziani
- Succeeded by: Christopher Davis

Personal details
- Born: October 1, 1950 (age 75) New York City, New York, U.S.
- Party: Democratic
- Relatives: Edward C. Graziani (brother)

Ted Graziani (born October 1, 1950) is an American politician who served in the Connecticut House of Representatives from the 57th district from 1999 to 2011. He succeeded his brother, Edward C. Graziani.
