= Broad Brook Company =

Historic district in Connecticut, United States

- U.S. National Register of Historic Places
- U.S. Historic district
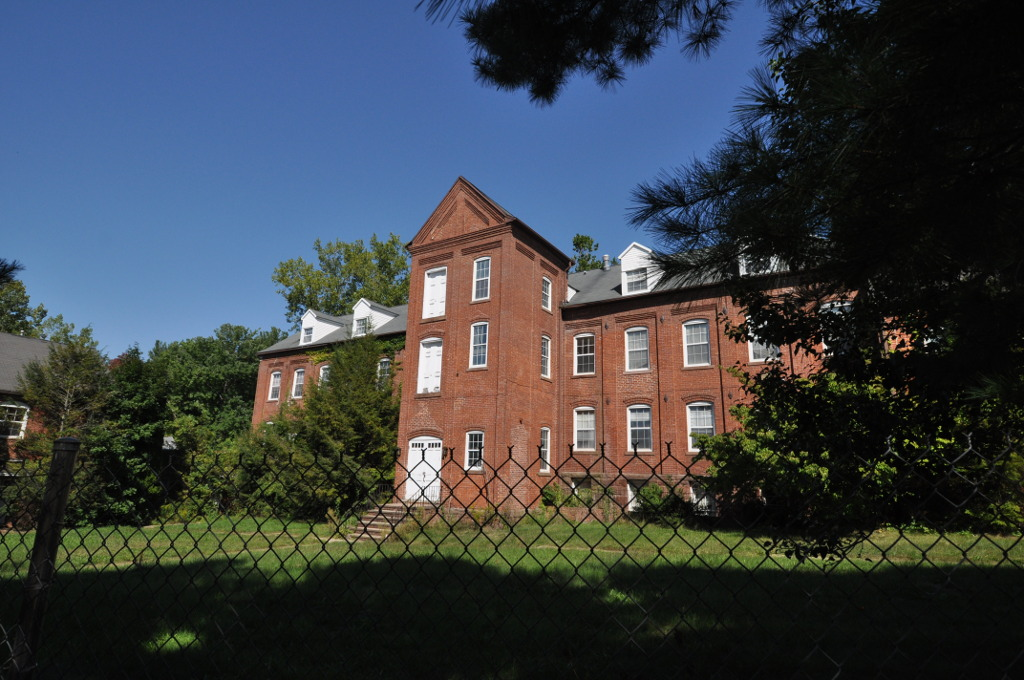

- Location within Connecticut Location within the United States
- Location: Scott Road and Main Street, East Windsor, Connecticut
- Coordinates: 41°55′1″N 72°32′50″W
- Area: 10.6 acres (4.3 ha)
- Architect: Multiple
- NRHP reference No.: 85000950
- Added to NRHP: May 2, 1985

The Broad Brook Company was a manufacturer of textiles in East Windsor, Connecticut, which operated from the 1830s until 1954. The company plant, located on Broad Brook at Main Street and Scott Road in the town's Broad Brook village, was listed on the National Register of Historic Places in 1985. Partially destroyed by fire, with surviving buildings converted into residential condominiums in the 1980s, the complex has been shuttered due to the discovery of toxic soil conditions on the property.

== Description and history ==
The Broad Brook Company complex was once the industrial center piece of Broad Brook village in northeastern East Windsor. Set astride Broad Brook west of Main Street, the company complex consisted of eighteen buildings of stone and wood, built over a period of over a century. One of the most prominent of those buildings still stands: the main mill building. It is a handsome 4-1/2 story structure with Italianate style built in 1867 and enlarged in 1880. Its facade is divided into bays defined by recessed panels, with stone corbelling at the top of each panel, some of the window sills, and the roof eave. A five-story stair tower projects near its center, with a gabled roof and more brick corbelling. Each level of the tower has doorways for the movement of large equipment to that level. Other surviving elements include the mill dam, which is located just across Main Street to the east, and a former steam boiler building.

The Broad Brook site had an industrial history dating to the early 19th century, when a sawmill, gristmill, and tannery were located at or near this site. A textile mill was established by the Phelps brothers in the 1830s, but it eventually failed, and was reorganized in the late 1840s into the Broad Brook Company. This company was an economic success, employing 300 people at the turn of the 20th century, producing a variety of woolen fabrics. By the 1930s, the company was producing cloth fabrics for upholstery in automobiles, and suffered significantly when that industry shifted to vinyl finishes in the 1950s.

In 1954 the plan was shuttered and sold to Hamilton Standard, a division of United Technologies. Hamilton manufactured printed circuit boards on the premises, involving electroplating chemicals and chlorine solvents. The company sold the property to real estate developers in 1977. In May 1986, a significant portion of the mill complex (which had by then been listed on the National Register of Historic Places) was destroyed by fire. The main mill building was converted into residential condominiums in the early 1990s. Chemical contamination was discovered in the property's soils in 1998, and the complex was shuttered in 2004. Although it has not been granted Superfund status, the US Environmental Protection Agency continues to monitor remediation efforts.

== Demolition ==
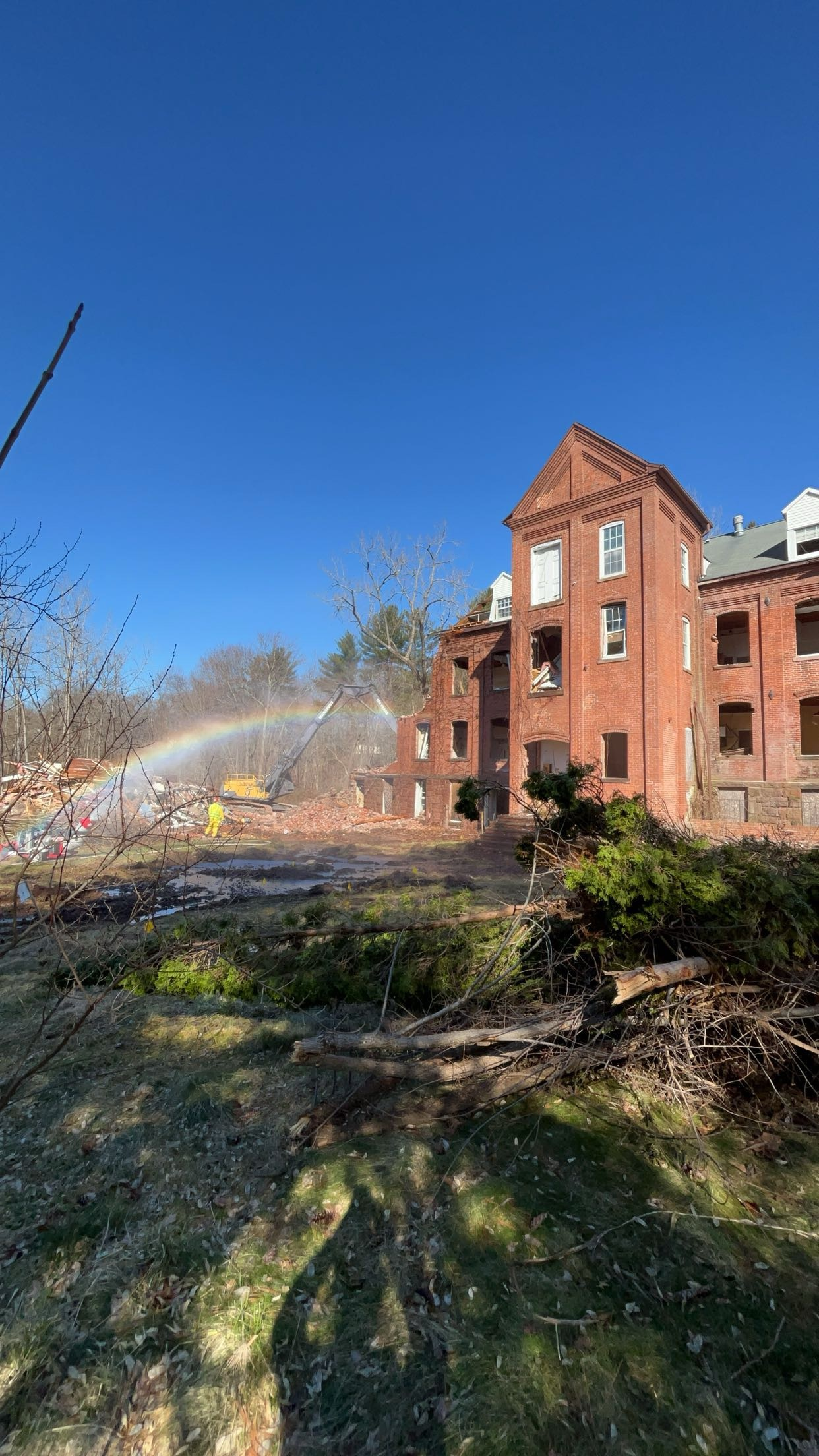
Main St. Mill Building Demolition, March 13, 2024.

The scope and complete timeframe are unknown; however, the demolition of several historic buildings commenced in the spring of 2024. The brick buildings that sat on the shuttered property were demolished. They included 104 Main St. and adjacent buildings on the defunct Scott Rd.

Demolition crews tore down the buildings with an excavator, while hosing debris to mitigate dust.

== See also ==
- National Register of Historic Places listings in Hartford County, Connecticut
