= Square Pond =

Square Pond may refer to:

- Square Pond, a lake in York County, Maine
- An early name (circa 1800s) for Crystal Lake, Connecticut
