= East Windsor Academy =

- U.S. National Register of Historic Places
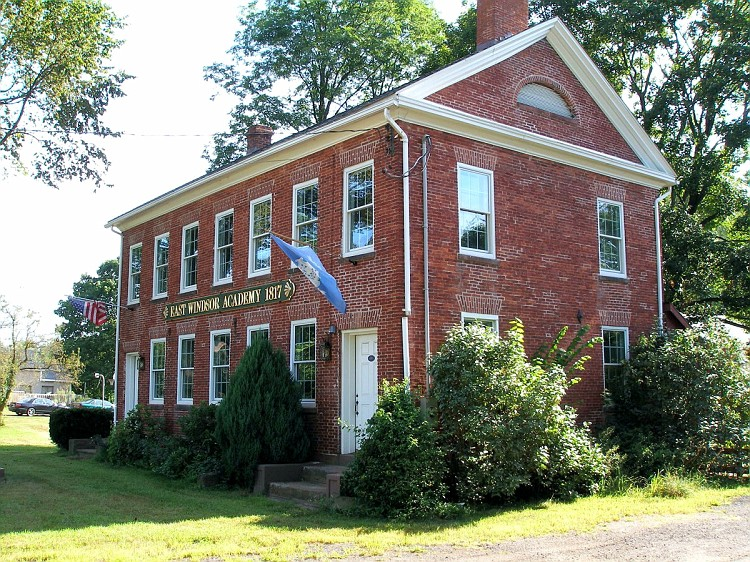

- Location within Connecticut Location within the United States
- Location: 115 Scantic Road, East Windsor, Connecticut
- Coordinates: 41°54′2″N 72°34′49″W
- Area: 0.6 acres (0.24 ha)
- Architectural style: Federal
- NRHP reference No.: 98000359
- Added to NRHP: December 3, 1998

The East Windsor Academy, now known as the Scantic Academy-East Windsor Historical Society Museum, is a historic school building at 115 Scantic Road in East Windsor, Connecticut. Built in 1817 as a private academy, it has seen use as a parish hall, apartments, and a public school before its conversion to a museum. It was listed on the National Register of Historic Places in 1998.

== Description and history ==
The East Windsor Academy building is located in East Windsor's Scantic village, on the east side of Scantic Road (Connecticut Route 191). It is a two-story brick building with a gable roof and a brownstone foundation. Its front facade is six bays wide, with entrances in the outer bays, and sash windows elsewhere. The side elevations feature fully pedimented gables with fanlights at the center. Windows are set in rectangular openings, with brownstone sills and splayed soldier brick headers.

The school was built in 1817 as a private academy, a role it served until 1871, when the building was sold to the First Congregational Church for use as a parish hall. The prominent educator Ezra Stiles taught here for a time, and one of its better known pupils was Junius Morgan, father to financier J. P. Morgan. In 1896 the building again became a school, which eventually became a public school. This period of use closed in 1938, and it was later converted to apartments before being given to the local historical society. The property now also includes other buildings used as exhibit spaces by the society.

== See also ==
- National Register of Historic Places listings in Hartford County, Connecticut
