= Connecticut Route 140 =

State highway in Connecticut, US

Route 140
- Map of northern Connecticut with Route 140 highlighted in red

Route information
- Maintained by CTDOT
- Length: 22.50 mi (36.21 km)
- Existed: 1932–present

Major junctions
- West end: Route 75 in Windsor Locks
- I-91 in East Windsor
- East end: Route 32 / Route 190 in Stafford

Location
- Country: United States
- State: Connecticut
- Counties: Hartford, Tolland

Highway system
- Connecticut State Highway System; Interstate; US; State; SSR; SR; Scenic
← Route 139	→ Route 142

Route 140 is a state highway in Connecticut in the northeastern part of the Greater Hartford area. Route 140 is a main artery connecting the town of Stafford to Windsor Locks.

== Route description ==
Route 140 starts out at Route 75, in Windsor Locks as Elm Street. It then begins an overlap with Route 159, before reaching a bridge, and turning away from Route 159. Now known as Bridge Street, it crosses the Connecticut River into East Windsor, then meets an intersection with I-91. Shortly thereafter, it meets an intersection with US 5, before changing its street name to North Road. It then becomes Sadd's Mill Road. It meets an intersection with Route 286, before becoming Maple Street. It then meets an overlap with Route 83, before becoming Crystal Lake Road. Route 140 then meets an overlap with Route 30, as it becomes Sandy Beach Road. Route 140 then ends as it reaches Route 190 and Route 32 in Stafford.

== History ==
Route 140 was commissioned in 1932, running from US 5 to Route 83 along the current routes of Routes 191, 140, and 286. In the 1920s, this route was known as State Highway 307. In 1961, with the opening of the Bradley Airport Connector as part of Route 20, Routes 140 and 191 were rerouted to their current locations in Windsor Locks and East Windsor. The following year, Route 140 in Windsor Locks was relocated from Spring Street (old Route 20) to Elm Street (former SR 523). In 1963, Route 140 was extended to its eastern terminus in Stafford, and rerouted slightly north to absorb a connector (Route 140A) between Route 83 and the center of Ellington in the process. In the late 1990s and 2002, the alignment was straightened in several parts of East Windsor and Ellington.

== Junction list ==
County	Location	mi	km	Destinations	Notes
Hartford	Windsor Locks	0.00	0.00	Route 75 (Ella T. Grasso Turnpike) – Suffield, Poquonock, Bradley International Airport	Western terminus
Hartford	Windsor Locks	2.28	3.67	Route 159 south (South Main Street) – Windsor, R.R. Station	Western end of Route 159 concurrency
Hartford	Windsor Locks	2.58	4.15	Route 159 north (Main Street) – Agawam, MA	Eastern end of Route 159 concurrency
Hartford	Connecticut River	2.63– 2.84	4.23– 4.57	Bridge Street Bridge	
Hartford	East Windsor	3.05	4.91	Main Street (SR 510)	
Hartford	East Windsor	3.55	5.71	I-91 – Hartford, Springfield	Exit 51 on I-91
Hartford	East Windsor	3.73	6.00	US 5 (Prospect Hill Road) – Enfield, South Windsor	
Hartford	East Windsor	7.39	11.89	Route 191 south (Main Street) – Broad Brook	Western end of Route 191 concurrency
Hartford	East Windsor	8.63	13.89	Route 191 north (Broad Brook Road) – Somers, Scitico	Eastern end of Route 191 concurrency
Tolland	Ellington	12.76	20.54	Route 286 (Main Street) – Rockville, Windemere	Access via Park Street; former routing of Route 140
Tolland	Ellington	13.72	22.08	Route 83 (Somers Road) – Rockville, Somers, Stafford Springs, Ellington Airport	
Tolland	Ellington	17.77	28.60	Route 30 (Stafford Road) – West Stafford, Tolland, Rockville	
Tolland	Stafford	22.50	36.21	Route 32 / Route 190 – Stafford Springs, Union, Monson, MA	Eastern terminus
1.000 mi = 1.609 km; 1.000 km = 0.621 mi
