= Bridge Street Bridge (Connecticut River) =

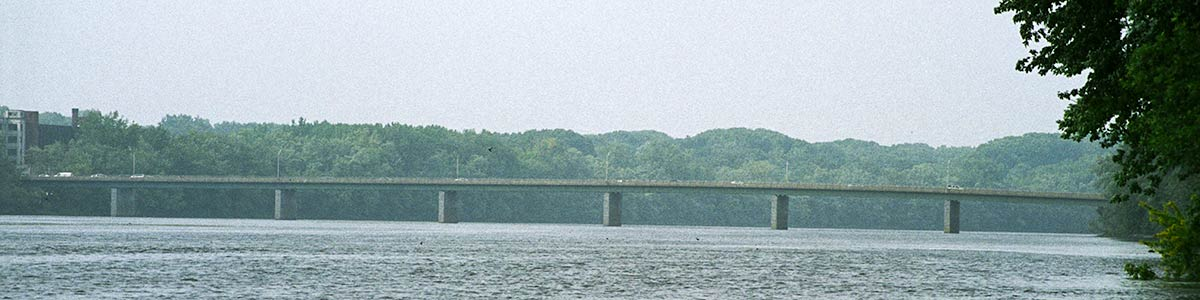
- Looking south at the Bridge Street Bridge in 2007
- Coordinates: 41°55′45″N 72°37′27″W
- Carries: Route 140
- Crosses: Connecticut River
- Locale: Windsor Locks, Connecticut and East Windsor, Connecticut

History
- Construction end: 1992

The Bridge Street Bridge is a crossing for Route 140 over the Connecticut River, connecting the towns of Windsor Locks and East Windsor. The current bridge was completed in 1992. The previous bridge at this location was a 7-span through Pratt truss built in 1921. Before that there was a suspension bridge built in 1886. Originally, there was a ferry secured to a mid-river pier.

== History ==
Starting in 1855, there was a ferry tied to a pier in the river to prevent it from being washed downstream. This was succeeded in 1886 with a suspension bridge built by the Windsor Locks and Warehouse Point Bridge and Ferry Company.

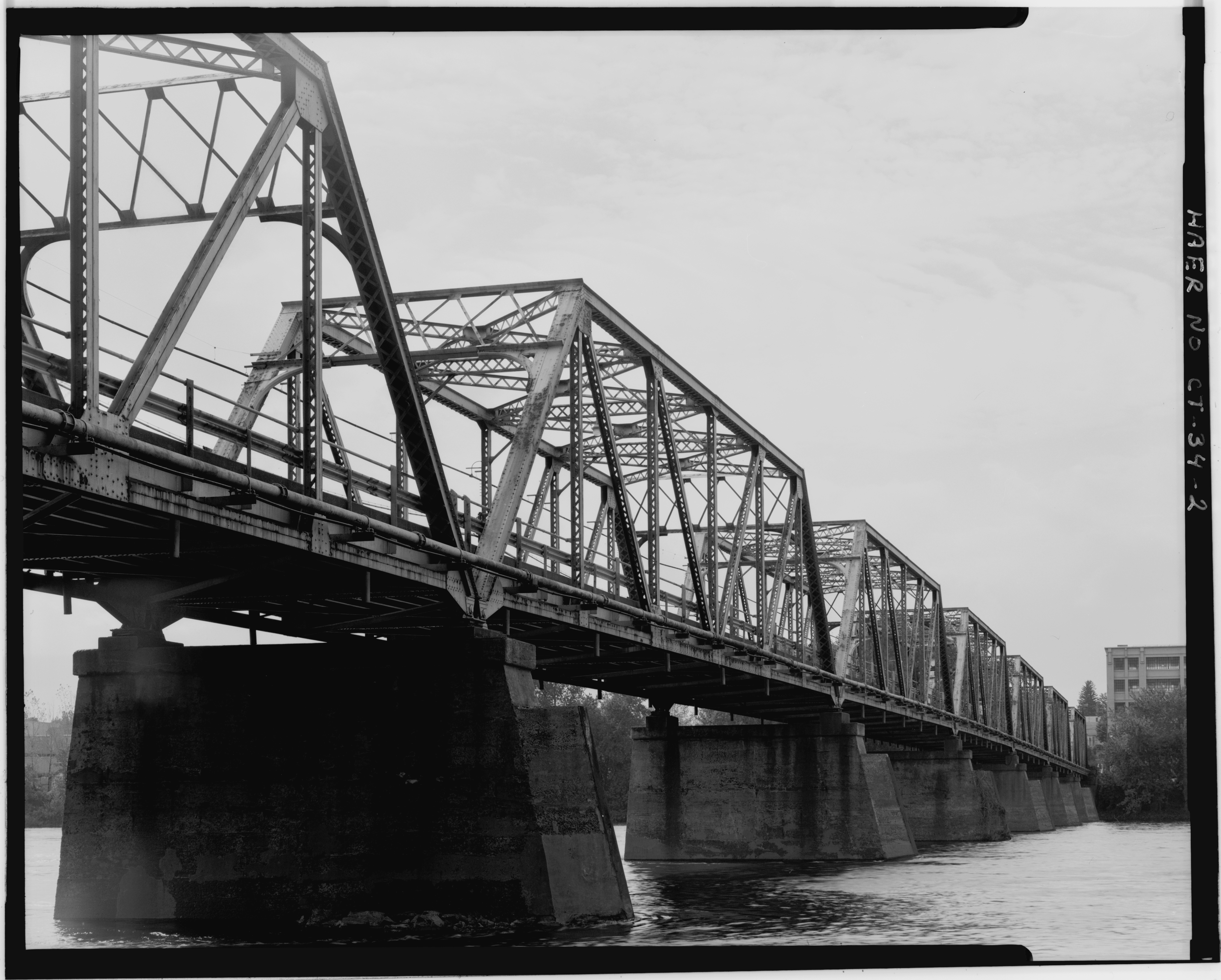
View of the north side of the 1921 bridge, looking southwest

The second bridge was a 7-span through Pratt truss structure completed in 1921. Each span was approximately 152 feet (46 m) long, consisting of six 25-foot-4-inch (7.72 m) panels for a total of approximately 1,064 feet (324 m) between abutments, and a 23-foot (7.0 m) curb-to-curb width. The design load limit was 15 short tons (14 t), though this was reduced to 10 short tons (9.1 t) in 1977. The truss structure was built by the Berlin Construction Company, directly north of the previous bridge.

The Berlin Construction Company was the historical successor to the Berlin Iron Bridge Company, earlier named the Corrugated Metal Company, which was established in 1868 as the American Corrugated Iron Company. This company, in one guise or another, built many bridges in southern New England, and perhaps beyond. It changed its name to Berlin Iron Bridge Company in 1883. It was purchased in 1900 by the American Bridge Company. When this happened, 3 of the executives formed the Berlin Construction Company, currently (as of 1988) active as the Berlin Steel Construction Company.

The current (third) bridge is a highway bridge completed in 1992.

== See also ==
- List of bridges documented by the Historic American Engineering Record in Connecticut
- List of crossings of the Connecticut River
