= Jaime Foster =

American politician

Member of the Connecticut House of Representatives from the 57th district
- Incumbent
- Assumed office January 6, 2021
- Preceded by: Christopher Davis

Personal details
- Born: 1990 (age 35–36)
- Party: Democratic
- Spouse: Aaron
- Children: 1
- Education: University of Connecticut (BS, MS, PhD)
- Profession: Politician, research scientist

Jaime Foster (born c. 1990) is an American politician and research scientist. Foster currently serves as a representative from the 57th District in the Connecticut House of Representatives. She is a member of the Democratic Party. Initially, Taylor Biniarz was intended to be the Democratic nominee for the seat, but after Biniarz stepped down in order to focus on activism work, Democrats nominated Foster instead. In the general election on November 3, 2020, Foster defeated Republican challenger David Stavens. Since beginning her term in 2021, she has been assigned to the Public Health Committee, the Children Committee, and the Energy and Technology Committee.
