= St. John's Episcopal Church (Warehouse Point, Connecticut) =

Historic church in Connecticut, United States

- U.S. National Register of Historic Places
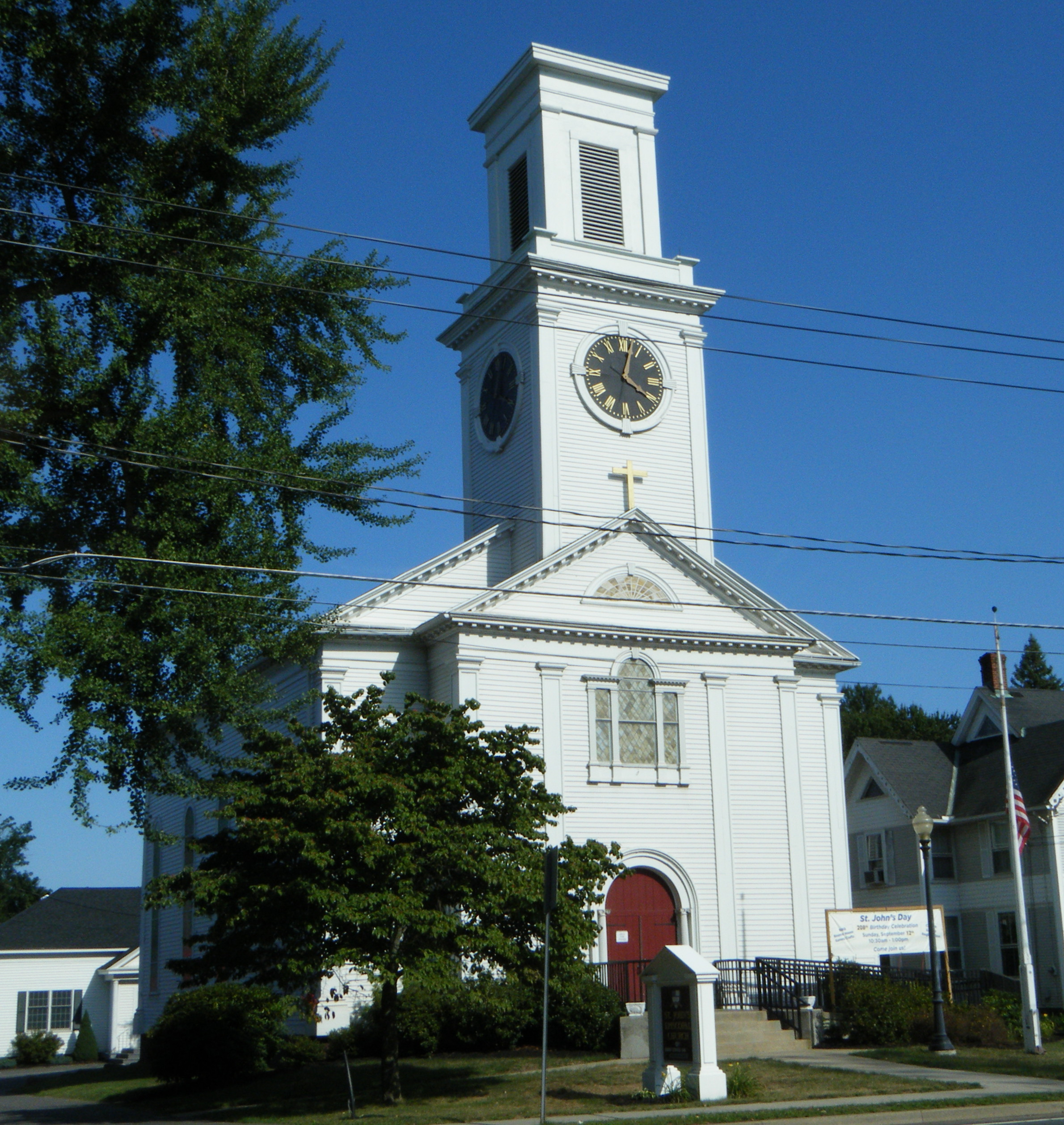

- Location within Connecticut Location within the United States
- Location: 92 Main Street, East Windsor, Connecticut
- Coordinates: 41°55′43″N 72°37′6″W
- Area: 2.4 acres (0.97 ha)
- Built: 1804
- Architect: Austin & Brown; Belcher, Samuel
- Architectural style: Federal; Gothic Revival
- NRHP reference No.: 82004442
- Added to NRHP: April 27, 1982

St. John's Episcopal Church is a historic church at 92 Main Street in the Warehouse Point section of East Windsor, Connecticut.

The church reported 96 members in 2015 and nine members in 2025. Plate and pledge income for the congregation in 2025 was $5,628 with average Sunday attendance (ASA) of 15.

Built in 1804, the church's interior was extensively restyled in the second half of the 19th century to resemble a Gothic English country church. The building, still in active use by the original congregation, was listed on the National Register of Historic Places in 1982.

== Architecture and history ==
St. John's is located in the center of the Warehouse Point village, just south of the junction of Main and Bridge Streets. It is a tall single-story wood-frame structure, with a projecting entry section, and a two-stage square tower housing a clock and bell. The main block's corners are pilastered, as are those of the projection, and there are full-height pilasters flanking the main entrance, above which is a stained-glass Palladian window.

The interior is a distinct contrast to the building's exterior. As originally built, it had a fairly traditional 18th-century meetinghouse plan, with a flat ceiling, galleries on the sides, and a Palladian window behind the pulpit. In 1855, the congregation retained the New Haven firm of Henry Austin to redesign it in the Gothic style. The side galleries were removed and the ceiling was transformed into a barrel vault, with a new chancel at the rear.

The church was designed by Samuel Belcher and built in 1809, and originally stood on the village green. It served as a union church serving both Methodists and Episcopalians until 1832, when the Methodists built their own church. It was moved to its present location in 1844.

== See also ==
- National Register of Historic Places listings in Hartford County, Connecticut
