= Eliphalet Chapin =

American furniture maker

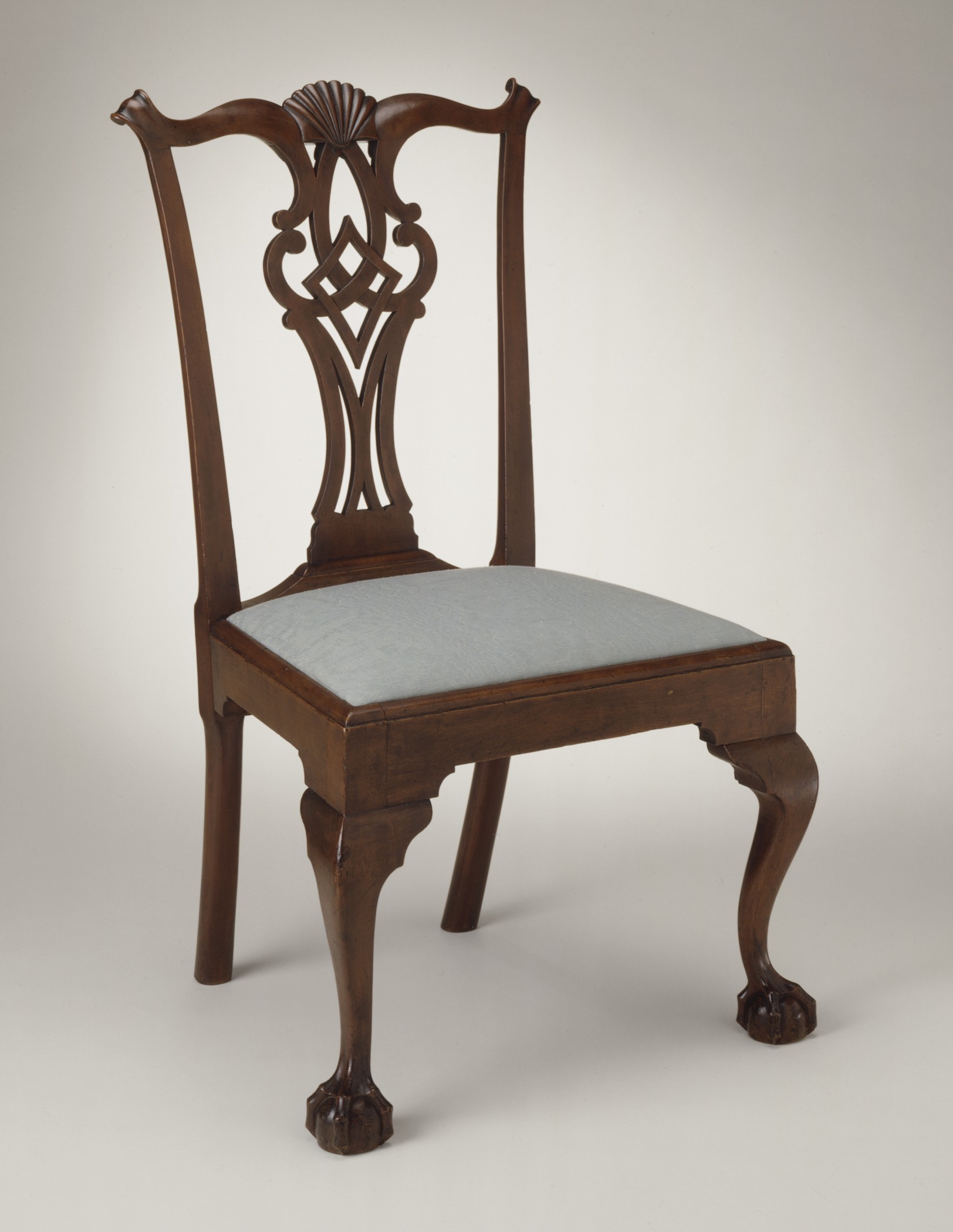
Side chair (c. 1780) attributed to Chapin, Los Angeles County Museum of Art.

Eliphalet Chapin (1741–1807) was a cabinetmaker and furniture maker in East Windsor, Connecticut in the late 18th century. His style of furniture design is regarded as one of the most elegant of its time.

Chapin was born in Massachusetts; his family were woodworkers, and he too entered the trade. In his early 20s, he was named in a paternity suit by Hannah Bartlett. Although he denied the suit, he settled with Bartlett by deeding a tract of land over to her. Probably as a result, in 1767 he moved to Philadelphia, a colonial center of fine furniture construction, to further study his craft. In the 18th century, Philadelphia was one of the most important cities both before and after the American Revolution and was a center of style and culture. At age 30, he returned to Connecticut, building a home and workshop in East Windsor where he spent the rest of his life, operating his furniture making shop from 1771 through 1798.

In contrast to the general style of his contemporary Connecticut furniture makers, which was tall and slim, with long slim legs, Chapin had a style which was more compact, blocky, and chunky, but lighter and cleaner in detail than the Philadelphia rococo design from which he also drew inspiration, resulting in a style known as Connecticut Chippendale. The detail work on his furniture was also consistent and distinctive, with similar very highly detailed carvings on the ball and claw feet of his furniture, similar distinctive spiral rosettes, open fretwork, scrolled pediments, and other decorations. This makes his pieces identifiable, even though he did not sign them or apply a maker's mark. The quality of construction extended even to invisible parts of the furniture; interiors and undersides of drawers were finished just as meticulously as the exteriors, pieces of wood were dovetailed together almost seamlessly, and no pegs or nails are showing in the finished work.

Eliphalet's second cousin or nephew Aaron Chapin also worked in Eliphalet's shop between 1774 and 1783. In the 1930s, a debate raged through the furniture scholar community over whether Aaron or Eliphalet was the real mastermind behind the style; the reluctance of either to sign their pieces (no signed piece by Eliphalet and only a few by Aaron have ever been found) has led to over a century of arguing about which Chapin was the actual builder behind any specific piece. It is currently believed, however, that Eliphalet was indeed the driving force, and his work is the more highly prized (and conversely, the more highly prized works are assumed to be by him).

East Windsor marriage records show that Eliphalet was married to Mary Darling on November 25, 1773, and to "Anne Read of Canterbury" on June 18, 1778; and that Aaron married Mary King on September 15, 1777. He died in East Windsor, Connecticut.
