= Connecticut Route 286 =

State highway in northern Connecticut, US

Route 286
- Map of Tolland County in northern Connecticut with Route 286 highlighted in red

Route information
- Maintained by CTDOT
- Length: 3.60 mi (5.79 km)
- Existed: 1963–present

Major junctions
- South end: Route 74 in Ellington
- North end: Route 83 in Ellington

Location
- Country: United States
- State: Connecticut

Highway system
- Connecticut State Highway System; Interstate; US; State; SSR; SR; Scenic
← I-284	→ Route 287

Route 286 is a minor state highway in northern Connecticut running entirely within the town of Ellington. It serves the community of Windermere Village.

== Route description ==
Route 286 begins as Pinney Street at an intersection with Route 74 in southern Ellington. It heads north 2.6 miles (4.2 km) to the Ellington town center, passing by the residential community of Windermere Village along the way. In Ellington center, Route 286 turns east along Main Street, intersecting Route 140 at the town green. Route 286 continues east another 0.6 miles (0.97 km) before ending at an intersection with Route 83.

== History ==
Most of modern Route 286 was first designated as a state highway at the beginning of 1963 as part of the Route Reclassification Act. The Main Street portion of Route 286 was originally part of Route 140. Route 140 was extended eastward in 1963 and was relocated to use Maple Street, with the Main Street portion becoming part of Route 286. Route 286 has had no significant changes since.

== Junction list ==
The entire route is in Ellington, Tolland County.

mi	km	Destinations	Notes
0.00	0.00	Route 74 – Rockville, South Windsor	Southern terminus
2.98	4.80	Route 140 – Crystal Lake, Ellington, Bradley International Airport	Access via Park Street; former routing of Route 286
3.60	5.79	Route 83 – Rockville, Somers	Northern terminus
1.000 mi = 1.609 km; 1.000 km = 0.621 mi
