= Connecticut Route 94 =

State highway in central Connecticut, US

Route 94
- Map of central Connecticut with Route 94 highlighted in red

Route information
- Maintained by CTDOT
- Length: 9.33 mi (15.02 km)
- Existed: 1932–present

Major junctions
- West end: Route 2 in Glastonbury
- East end: Route 85 in Hebron

Location
- Country: United States
- State: Connecticut
- Counties: Hartford, Tolland

Highway system
- Connecticut State Highway System; Interstate; US; State; SSR; SR; Scenic
← I-91	→ I-95

Route 94 is an east–west state highway in Connecticut running for 9.33 miles (15.02 km) from Route 2 (Exit 8) in Glastonbury to Route 85 in Hebron.

== Route description ==
Route 94 officially begins as the Exit 8 offramp of eastbound Route 2 in western Glastonbury (in the Addison section of town). It turns east on Hebron Avenue and crosses under the Route 17 expressway without an interchange, and then under Route 2 (about 330 yards (300 m) east of the end of the eastbound offramp). Hebron Avenue continues eastward through Glastonbury for another 3.75 miles (6.04 km), meeting with Route 83 (which heads for Manchester and East Glastonbury). After another 1.1 miles (1.8 km), it crosses Roaring Brook and becomes mainly a rural collector road as it heads towards the town of Hebron. Along the way it passes by the Macclain Earth Products factory as it traverses the rural part of Glastonbury. Route 94 crosses into the town of Hebron about 3.3 miles (5.3 km) east of Roaring Brook becoming known as Gilead Street, where it ends 0.8 miles (1.3 km) east of the town line at an intersection with Route 85. Gilead Street continues further east as southbound Route 85 towards the town center of Hebron.

Route 94 is designated the 94th Infantry Division Memorial Highway from Route 2 to the Glastonbury-Hebron town line.

== History ==
In the early 1920s, State Highway 165 was designated as the road from Main Street in Glastonbury Center (at New England Route 17), through Addison, to then State Highway 164 (now Route 83). In the 1932 state highway renumbering, modern Route 94 was created from the entire length of former Highway 165 as well as an eastward extension to newly established Route 85 in Hebron. In 1957, when after the portion of the Route 2 expressway in Glastonbury opened, Route 2 was relocated to the new expressway and the western terminus of Route 94 was also moved to the current location. There have also been several curves straightened in Glastonbury between 1958 and 2004.

== Junction list ==
County	Location	mi	km	Destinations	Notes
Hartford	Glastonbury	0.00	0.00	Route 2 – Norwich, Hartford	Western terminus; exit 8 on Route 2
Hartford	Glastonbury	4.14	6.66	Route 83 – Manchester, East Glastonbury	
Tolland	Hebron	9.33	15.02	Route 85 – Andover, Bolton, Hebron, Gilead	Eastern terminus
1.000 mi = 1.609 km; 1.000 km = 0.621 mi
