= Holt Memorial Fountain =

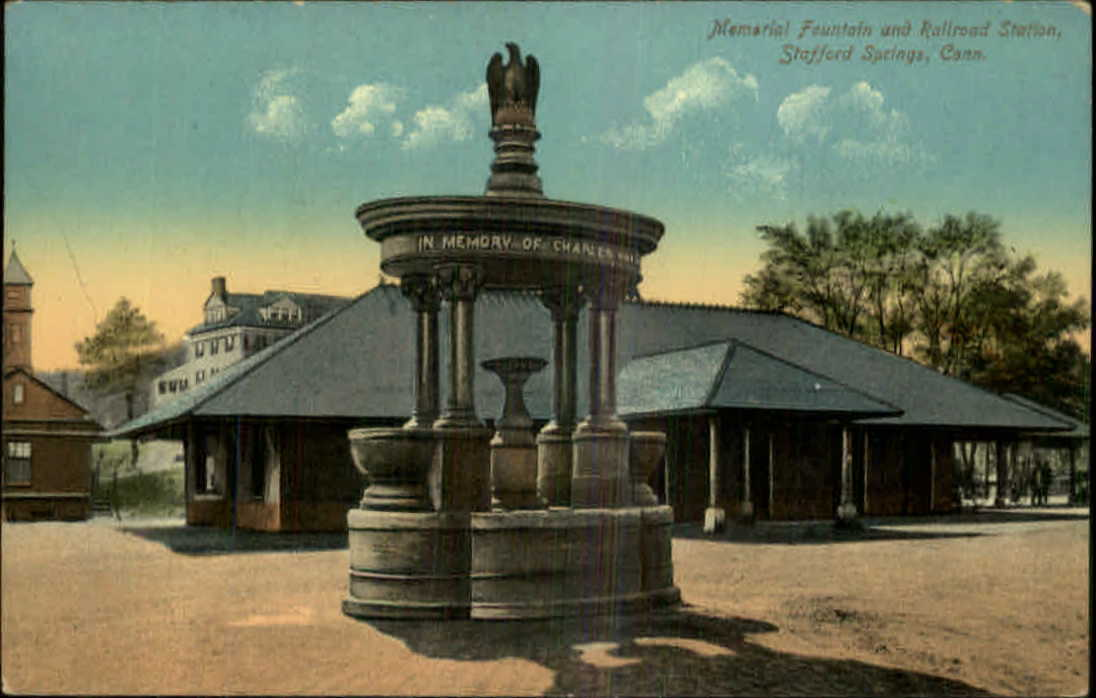
- A postcard of the fountain from 1910
- Location: Stafford Springs, Connecticut
- Coordinates: 41°57′13″N 72°18′11″W
- Type: Fountain
- Material: Stone
- Length: 16 feet (4.9 m)
- Height: 12 feet (3.7 m)
- Completion date: 1894
- Dedicated to: Charles Holt

The Holt Memorial Fountain is a fountain located in Stafford Springs, Connecticut. The fountain was built in 1894 in memorial of Charles Holt, the owner of the Phoenix Woolen Co, a local mill. The fountain causes a roundabout to form with Route 32 and Route 190 intersecting. The fountain water system had been broken due to a truck crash some time before 1996. The fountain was proposed to be moved in 1990 to help traffic, but it was greatly opposed by the town. The former railroad station is located less than 100 feet away.
