= Christopher Davis (politician) =

American politician

Member of the Connecticut House of Representatives from the 57th district
- In office 2011–2021
- Preceded by: Edward C. Graziani
- Succeeded by: Jaime Foster

Personal details
- Party: Republican
- Education: University of Connecticut (M.A.), (B.A.)

Christopher Davis is an American politician who served in the Connecticut House of Representatives from 2011 to 2021, representing the 57th district as a Republican.
