= Jerry Marquis =

American racing driver

- Born: February 14, 1956 (age 70); Broad Brook, Connecticut, U.S.
- Achievements: 2000 Featherlite Modified Series Champion
- Awards: 1994 Busch North Series Rookie of the Year

NASCAR O'Reilly Auto Parts Series career
- 2 races run over 1 year
- First race: 1995 NE Chevy Dealers 250 (Loudon)
- Last race: 1995 Meridian Advantage 200 (Nazareth)
Wins	Top tens	Poles
0	0	0

NASCAR FedEx Freight Truck Series career
- 1 race run over 1 year
- Best finish: 119th (1997)
- First race: 1997 Virginia Is For Lovers 200 (Richmond)
- Last race: 1997 Virginia Is For Lovers 200 (Richmond)
Wins	Top tens	Poles
0	0	0
- Statistics up to date as of August 17, 2014.

Jerry Marquis (born February 14, 1956) is an American former professional stock car racing driver who competed in the NASCAR Busch Series, the NASCAR Craftsman Truck Series, the NASCAR Busch North Series, and the NASCAR Whelen Modified Tour. He is from Broad Brook, Connecticut.

Marquis has won seven NASCAR Busch North Series race, putting him 16th on the all-time list in the Busch North Series. His home track was Stafford Motor Speedway. Marquis was also infamous for NASCAR's former commentator Bill Weber and the "bodyguard to the stars" incident. He spun out Tony Stewart who was racing a NASCAR Modified race car that day with five laps to go and when the race was over a personal friend was pulled away by Weber and was to do an interview. Marquis declined to comment.

Marquis also raced in two Busch series races for Mike Greci in the No. 51 Wheels Discount Auto Chevy at Loudon and at Nazareth. He also raced in the No. 18 DANA Corp Truck at Richmond in 1997 driving for Kurt Roehrig. He is most notable for winning the 2000 NASCAR Winston Modified Tour Championship with sponsorship from LongView RV and Teddy Bear Pools. He won at Riverhead, Seekonk, Thompson, Waterford, and Stafford Springs.

== Motorsports career results ==
=== NASCAR ===
(key) (Bold – Pole position awarded by qualifying time. Italics – Pole position earned by points standings or practice time. * – Most laps led.)

==== Busch Series ====
NASCAR Busch Series results
Year	Team	No.	Make	1	2	3	4	5	6	7	8	9	10	11	12	13	14	15	16	17	18	19	20	21	22	23	24	25	26	27	28	NBGNC	Pts	Ref
1994	Info not available			DAY	CAR	RCH	ATL	MAR	DAR	HCY	BRI	ROU	NHA; DNQ	NZH	CLT	DOV	MYB	GLN	MLW	SBO	TAL	HCY	IRP	MCH	BRI	DAR	RCH	DOV	CLT	MAR	CAR	N/A	-	
1995	Greci Motorsports	51	Chevy	DAY	CAR	RCH	ATL	NSV	DAR	BRI	HCY	NHA; 38																				N/A	0^{1}	
1995	Greci Motorsports	5	Chevy										NZH; 29	CLT	DOV	MYB	GLN	MLW	TAL	SBO	IRP	MCH	BRI	DAR	RCH	DOV	CLT	CAR	HOM			N/A	0^{1}	
1996	Pease Motorsports	8	Chevy	DAY; DNQ	CAR	RCH	ATL	NSV	DAR	BRI	HCY	NZH	CLT	DOV	SBO	MYB	GLN	MLW	NHA	TAL	IRP	MCH	BRI	DAR	RCH	DOV	CLT	CAR	HOM			N/A	-	

==== Craftsman Truck Series ====
NASCAR Craftsman Truck Series results
Year	Team	No.	Make	1	2	3	4	5	6	7	8	9	10	11	12	13	14	15	16	17	18	19	20	21	22	23	24	25	26	NCTC	Pts	Ref
1997	Roehrig Motorsports	18	Dodge	WDW	TUS	HOM	PHO	POR	EVG	I70	NHA	TEX	BRI	NZH	MLW	LVL	CNS	HPT	IRP	FLM	NSV	GLN	RCH; 28	MAR	SON	MMR	CAL	PHO	LVS	119th	79	

^{1} Competed only in companion events with Busch North Series as BNS driver and ineligible for Busch Series points

Sporting positions
Preceded by Tony Hirschman Jr.	NASCAR Winston Modified Tour Champion; 2000	Succeeded by Mike Stefanik
