= Stafford Springs, Connecticut =

Census-designated place in Connecticut, United States

Stafford Springs
- Census-designated place
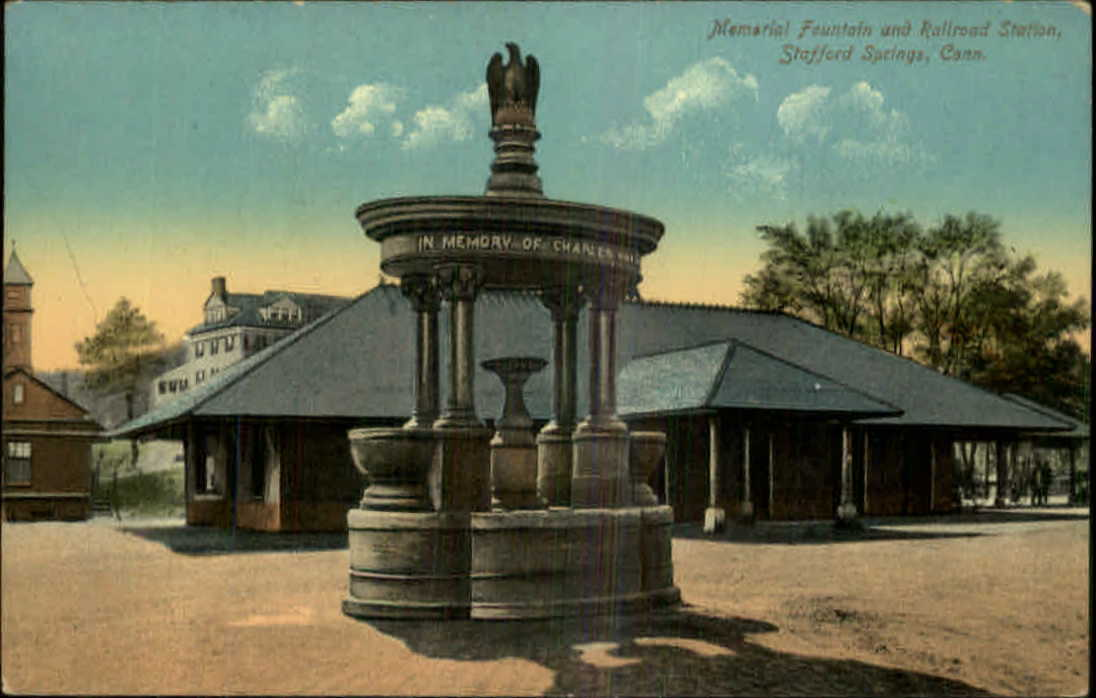
- The former Stafford Springs railroad station, with the Holt Memorial Fountain visible in the foreground, circa 1910

- Location in Tolland County and the state of Connecticut
- Coordinates: 41.9534°N 72.3030°W
- Country: United States
- State: Connecticut
- County: Tolland
- Region: Capitol Region
- Town: Stafford

Area
  - Total: 6.4 sq mi (16.6 km^{2})
  - Land: 6.4 sq mi (16.5 km^{2})
  - Water: 0.036 sq mi (0.093 km^{2})
- Elevation: 607 ft (185 m)

Population (2020)
  - Total: 4,780
  - Density: 750/sq mi (290/km^{2})
- Time zone: UTC−5 (Eastern (EST))
  - Summer (DST): UTC−4 (EDT)
- ZIP code: 06076
- Area code: 860 / 959
- FIPS code: 09-72300
- GNIS feature ID: 2377866
- Website: staffordct.org
- Stafford Springs Historic District
- U.S. National Register of Historic Places
- U.S. Historic district
- Location within Connecticut
- Location: E Main St, Furnace Ave, Main St, Highland Ter, River Rd, Silver St, Spring St, Stafford, Connecticut
- Area: 163 acres (66 ha)
- NRHP reference No.: 100011768
- Added to NRHP: April 17, 2025

Stafford Springs is a census-designated place located in Stafford, Connecticut, United States. The population was 4,780 at the 2020 Census. The village was a borough until November 1991, when it was disincorporated.

Located near the source of the Willimantic River, the textile and machine-shop industries expanded rapidly due to the village's strategic water access, becoming the backbone of the local economy. The village has the Holt Memorial Fountain and the former railroad station. A portion of the village center was listed on the National Register of Historic Places in 2025.

In the 18th century, the spring at Stafford Springs was famous for its reputed ability to cure "the gout, sterility, pulmonary, hysterics, etc." In 1771, John Adams, then a young lawyer, visited Stafford Springs for several days after suffering from overwork and anxiety.

Stafford Springs was once the headquarters of Station C of the Connecticut State Police, and subsequently was the site of the Troop C Barracks.

Connecticut Routes 19, 32, 140, and 190 pass through or originate in the village.

== History ==
=== Indigenous peoples and early settlement ===
The land that would become Stafford Springs was originally Mohegan territory. Indigenous peoples had long frequented the area's iron and sulfur mineral springs, reportedly drinking the waters for their invigorating properties. The region was acquired by Major James Fitch of Canterbury in a transaction that the Connecticut General Assembly did not fully accept; in 1718, the Assembly ordered that a town be laid out "of seven mile square ... eastward of Enfield," marking the beginning of legal settlement. Stafford was formally incorporated as a town in 1719. At the time of incorporation, the area was sparsely settled by farming families, with early industries closely tied to the agricultural economy: grist, saw, and fulling mills were built along fast-moving streams such as Furnace Brook.

Bog iron was discovered early in the settlement's history, and furnaces were built to smelt the ore for iron castings and tools. This early iron industry laid the groundwork for the village's later industrial growth.

=== Mineral springs resort era ===
By 1765, Stafford Springs had become regionally famous for its natural mineral springs, and after the American Revolution, visitors came from across the country to drink the iron and sulfur waters, which were believed to possess curative powers. The village developed into a popular resort destination drawing wealthy and prominent visitors throughout the late 18th and early 19th centuries. In 1771, a young John Adams—then a lawyer, years before his presidency—stayed in Stafford Springs for several days while recovering from overwork and anxiety, drawn by the reputation of the mineral waters. The springs were reputed to treat ailments ranging from gout and sterility to pulmonary complaints and hysteria, and elite society from across the nation gathered there during this period.

=== Industrial era ===
As the popularity of the springs declined through the latter half of the 19th century, Stafford Springs transitioned into an industrial center. The waterpower available from the Willimantic River and its tributaries provided an ideal foundation for mill-based manufacturing.

The first woolen mill in Stafford Springs, the Mineral Springs Manufacturing Company, was established in 1839 by Solva Converse on Spring Street. Following a serious fire and subsequent rebuilding in 1848, Solva and his brother Parley Converse became partners; by 1854, Solva became the sole owner and transitioned production from satinets to woolen goods over the following decade. The mill complex was eventually sold to the Middle River Woolen Company in 1899 and subsequently leased to Frederick Faulkner and Company of Lowell, Massachusetts, before a massive fire in August 1913 destroyed the buildings and ended the firm's operations. The Stafford Worsted Company erected a new factory on the site in 1916.

The Warren Mills, founded in 1853, became one of the most prominent operations in the village and is considered one of the oldest continuously operating textile mills in the United States. By the mid-19th century, Stafford Springs had developed a robust machine-shop industry alongside its textile production. Inventors and manufacturers in the area produced significant contributions to industrial technology: Eli Horton supplied spinning mules and machines to mills throughout eastern Connecticut; Moses B. Harvey invented and manufactured a flock cutter and other cloth-dressing machines; and Elijah Fairman patented a satinet loom. Elijah Fairman's son, Simon, invented a scroll-type lathe chuck (patented 1840), a fixture that became standard equipment in machine shops across the country.

During the American Civil War, Stafford Springs factories produced cannonballs in support of the Union war effort.

In addition to textiles, the village hosted a button factory operated by B. Schwanda & Sons, which manufactured buttons from mother of pearl imported from overseas, reflecting the broader diversity of Stafford Springs' manufacturing economy.

With its many mills and mill-associated businesses, Stafford Springs incorporated as a borough within the Town of Stafford in 1873, establishing its own local government to manage the rapidly growing village center. The borough was disincorporated in November 1991, after which governance reverted fully to the Town of Stafford.

=== 20th century and later ===
The decline of New England's textile industry in the 20th century significantly impacted Stafford Springs, as mills closed or consolidated operations. By the late 20th century, only a small number of textile operations remained active in the area. In 1988, the Italian luxury goods producer Loro Piana acquired the Warren Mills complex, investing in its preservation and operation for 26 years. In 2014, the American Woolen Company purchased the Warren Mills campus from Loro Piana with assistance from a loan and grant from the Connecticut Department of Economic and Community Development, with the stated intent of reintroducing luxury domestic textile manufacturing to the United States. Today, American Woolen Company operates from the Warren Mills and is described as the only domestic mill capable of producing the highest qualities of both worsted and woolen cloth, manufacturing fabrics for use in men's suits and luxury coats.

Stafford Springs was also formerly the headquarters of Station C of the Connecticut State Police and the subsequent site of the Troop C Barracks.

== Geography ==
According to the United States Census Bureau, the CDP has a total area of 6.41 mi^{2} (16.6 km^{2}), of which 6.37 mi^{2} (16.5 km^{2}) is land and 0.036 mi^{2} (0.093 km^{2}) (0.56%) is water.

The village sits at an elevation of approximately 607 feet (185 m) above sea level. It is located near the source of the Willimantic River, the flow of which historically powered the mill operations that shaped the community.

== Demographics ==
=== 2020 census ===
As of the 2020 census, Stafford Springs had a population of 4,780. The median age was 39.9 years. 19.0% of residents were under the age of 18 and 16.9% of residents were 65 years of age or older. For every 100 females there were 98.6 males, and for every 100 females age 18 and over there were 96.0 males age 18 and over.

88.6% of residents lived in urban areas, while 11.4% lived in rural areas.

There were 2,163 households in Stafford Springs, of which 25.4% had children under the age of 18 living in them. Of all households, 35.7% were married-couple households, 22.8% were households with a male householder and no spouse or partner present, and 31.0% were households with a female householder and no spouse or partner present. About 34.6% of all households were made up of individuals and 14.0% had someone living alone who was 65 years of age or older.

There were 2,364 housing units, of which 8.5% were vacant. The homeowner vacancy rate was 1.4% and the rental vacancy rate was 6.1%.

Racial composition as of the 2020 census
Race	Number	Percent
White	4,166	87.2%
Black or African American	74	1.5%
American Indian and Alaska Native	6	0.1%
Asian	76	1.6%
Native Hawaiian and Other Pacific Islander	1	0.0%
Some other race	92	1.9%
Two or more races	365	7.6%
Hispanic or Latino (of any race)	290	6.1%

=== Historical population ===
Historical population
Census	Pop.	Note	%±
1880	2,081		—
1890	2,353		13.1%
1900	2,640		12.2%
1910	3,059		15.9%
1920	3,383		10.6%
1930	3,492		3.2%
1940	3,401		−2.6%
1950	3,396		−0.1%
1960	3,322		−2.2%
1970	3,339		0.5%
1980	3,392		1.6%
1990	4,100		20.9%
2010	4,988		—
2020	4,780		−4.2%

== Economy ==
The local economy of Stafford Springs employs approximately 2,030 people as of 2024, a decline from roughly 2,220 in 2023. The most common employment sectors for village residents include retail trade, health care and social assistance, and office and administrative support occupations. The median property value in 2024 was $230,300, with a homeownership rate of 63.3%.

The American Woolen Company, headquartered at the historic Warren Mills campus in the village, remains the most prominent manufacturer in Stafford Springs. Warren Mills has been in continuous operation since 1853 and is considered one of the oldest continuously running textile mills in the United States. The company produces luxury worsted and woolen fabrics, including cashmere and camel hair materials, for high-end garment manufacturers. The mill is described as the only domestic operation capable of producing the highest qualities of both worsted and woolen cloth.

Stafford Springs also has a small arts and retail scene along Main Street, which features a restored vaudeville theater, independent shops, and a craft cider brewery. Several of the former 19th-century mill buildings have been repurposed into studios, shops, and eateries.

== Landmarks and points of interest ==
=== Holt Memorial Fountain ===
The Holt Memorial Fountain is a prominent landmark located at the convergence of Route 32, Route 190, and Furnace Avenue in the center of Stafford Springs, forming a traffic roundabout that has been described as one of New England's oldest traffic circles. Built in 1894, the granite fountain under a four-pillared canopy memorializes Charles Holt, owner of the Phoenix Woolen Company and president of the Stafford Savings Bank. The monument was donated by Holt's wife, Joana, and daughter, Celia, following his death in 1892. A proposal to relocate the fountain to improve traffic flow was raised in 1990 but was strongly opposed by the community, and the fountain remains in its original location.

=== Stafford Springs Historic District ===
A 163-acre portion of the village center was listed on the National Register of Historic Places in April 2025 as the Stafford Springs Historic District. The district encompasses East Main Street, Furnace Avenue, Main Street, Highland Terrace, River Road, Silver Street, and Spring Street.

=== Stafford Historical Society Museum ===
The Stafford Historical Society operates a museum housed in a Victorian building constructed between 1887 and 1889 by Julius Converse as the office and bottling facility of the Mineral Springs Manufacturing Company Mill. In 1896, it was deeded to the Stafford Library Association and served as the town library for over a century until 2001, when the library relocated and the building was leased to the Stafford Historical Society for use as a museum. The museum documents local industries and companies, including B. Schwanda & Sons, which manufactured mother-of-pearl buttons.

=== Former railroad station ===
The former Stafford Springs railroad station, located within 100 feet of the Holt Memorial Fountain, is among the village's remaining historic structures. The station dates to the era when rail connections played a central role in transporting goods produced by the local mills.

=== Northeast States Civilian Conservation Corps Museum ===
Located at 166 Chestnut Hill Road in Stafford, the Northeast States Civilian Conservation Corps Museum is housed in the only remaining CCC barracks building in Connecticut. The museum preserves tools, documents, photographs, memorabilia, and personal accounts from CCC veterans across the northeastern United States.

=== Stafford Speedway ===
Stafford Speedway is a half-mile paved oval track located at 55 West Street in Stafford Springs. The facility originated in 1870 as the Stafford Springs Agricultural Park, a 100-acre fairgrounds that hosted some of the largest agricultural exhibitions in New England and featured a half-mile harness racing track. After World War II, the venue transitioned to automobile racing, and in 1959 entered a long-term sanctioning agreement with NASCAR, hosting weekly NASCAR events ever since under successive names: Stafford Springs Speedway (1946–1958), Stafford Springs Motor Speedway (1959–1978), Stafford Motor Speedway (1979–2022), and its current name, Stafford Speedway. The track was paved with asphalt in 1967.

Stafford Speedway holds weekly racing on Friday nights from May through September and has a seating capacity of approximately 10,000. It is particularly known as a proving ground for NASCAR Whelen Modified Tour competitors and has hosted over 140 NASCAR Whelen Modified Tour events since 1985, the second-most of any track in the series' modern era. Notable drivers who built their careers at the track include Ryan Preece and Geoff Bodine, the latter of whom went on to win the 1986 Daytona 500.
