= Ellington, Connecticut =

- Town
- Town of Ellington
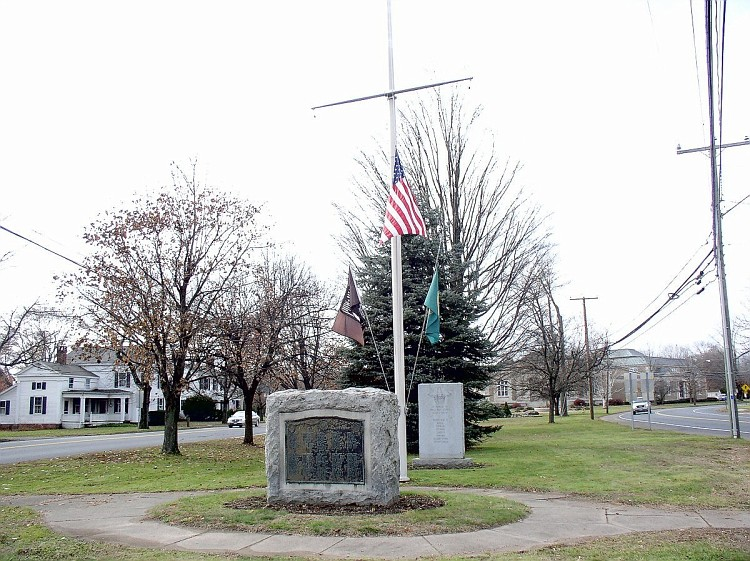
- The town green

- Flag Seal
- Motto: "A Great Place to Grow"
- Interactive map of Ellington, Connecticut
- Coordinates: 41°55′00″N 72°27′28″W
- Country: United States
- U.S. state: Connecticut
- County: Tolland
- Region: Capitol Region
- Incorporated: 1786

Government
  - Type: Selectman-town meeting
  - First Selectman: Lauri Burstein (D)
  - Selectmen: David Stavens (R); Mary Cardin (D); James Prichard (R); Jamison Boucher (D); Su Thanvanthri(D); Charlotte Ward (D)

Area
  - Total: 34.6 sq mi (89.6 km^{2})
  - Land: 34.1 sq mi (88.2 km^{2})
  - Water: 0.54 sq mi (1.4 km^{2})
- Elevation: 246 ft (75 m)

Population (2020)
  - Total: 16,426
  - Density: 482/sq mi (186.2/km^{2})
- Time zone: UTC−5 (Eastern)
  - Summer (DST): UTC−4 (Eastern)
- ZIP Code: 06029
- Area codes: 860/959
- FIPS code: 09-25360
- GNIS feature ID: 0212330
- Website: www.ellington-ct.gov

Ellington is a town in Tolland County, Connecticut, United States. Ellington was incorporated in May 1786, from East Windsor. The town is part of the Capitol Planning Region. As of the 2020 census, the town population was 16,426.

== History ==
The land that became Ellington was named by the natives as “Weexskashuck” which translates to “Great Marsh”. The earliest settlers called the area Great Marsh or Goshen. In 1671, the town of Windsor, purchased the land of East Windsor and Ellington from the Native Americans to recover land loss from the Connecticut-Massachusetts border dispute. Though no one attempted to settle the fertile lands for another 50 years. Samuel Pinney was the first settler in today's Ellington (Pinney Road bears his name in town). In 1733, Ellington was established as a Parish of the town of Windsor. East Windsor then split off from Windsor and held land in what is today's East Windsor, South Windsor and Ellington in May 1768. Ellington split off twenty years later and incorporated itself in May 1786. Mostly known as an agricultural community, the Crystal Lake section of town was for a while a popular summer resort location. Ellington still has a significant amount of property dedicated to agriculture including cattle and corn farming.

Ellington's sole representative to the voting on the adoption of the United States Constitution by Connecticut was Ebenezer Nash. Nash was an anti-federalist and voted against the ratification, which passed 128–40.

Ellington is home to one of America's oldest roadside memorials, remembering a boy killed in a road accident. A stone in the southwest corner of the town marks the site where Samuel Knight was killed "by a cartwheel rolling over his head in the 10th year of his age, Nov 8, 1812". The Christian hymn, "I love to steal awhile away" was written by Phoebe Hinsdale Brown in Ellington based on a personal experience in August 1818.

During the late 19th century and early 20th century, Ellington became the center of a community of Jewish immigrant farmers who were settled there by the philanthropist Baron Maurice de Hirsch's Jewish Colonization Association. They built a synagogue, Congregation Knesseth Israel, that is still standing and in use by an active Modern Orthodox congregation today and is on the National Register of Historic Places.

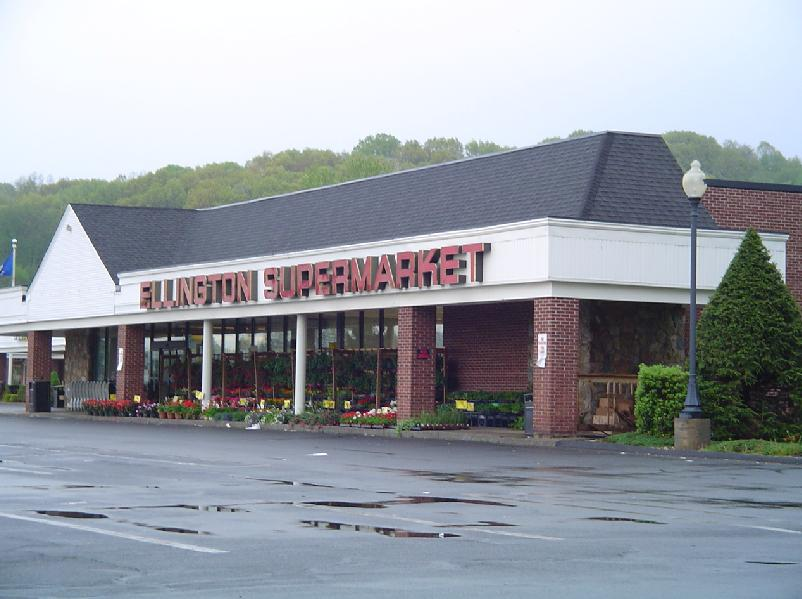
The Ellington Supermarket in May 2006, which has closed now.

On January 1, 1967, Ellington made national news when its residents assisted the city fire department in rescuing a pilot whose plane was having engine trouble and was unable to locate a runway in a fog that cut visibility to 200 feet. Under the direction and quick thinking of Resident State Trooper, Lionel Labreche, Connecticut State Police, dozens of people assembled at the town's unlit airstrip, Hyde Field, and illuminated the runway with their headlights, allowing the pilot to land safely.

In 1991, Ellington was proposed as a potential site for a low-level nuclear waste dump. Strong dissent from area residents forced the state to abandon the plan.

As it enters the 21st century, Ellington has had the 6th fastest growth rate of all the towns in Connecticut, and has been experiencing changes in growing from a rural farming town into a suburban community. Exemplative of this change was the displacement of the locally owned Ellington Supermarket by competition from the regional Big Y supermarket chain when a new Big Y was built adjacent to the older supermarket. An independent film entitled The Supermarket, was made about the incident.

== Geography ==
According to the United States Census Bureau, the town has a total area of 34.6 square miles (90 km^{2}), of which 34.0 square miles (88 km^{2}) is land and 0.6 square miles (1.6 km^{2}) (1.59%) is water.

Ellington is bordered by the towns of East Windsor, South Windsor, Vernon, Tolland, Willington, Stafford, Somers, and Enfield.

The town has a panhandle extending east to the Willimantic River and encompasses Crystal Lake. A large portion of the town's eastern portion is occupied by the Shenipsit State Forest which is bounded on the south by Shenipsit Lake and on the north by Soapstone Mountain.

=== Neighborhoods ===
- Crystal Lake
- Ellington Center
- Sadd's Mill
- Highland Avenue
- Windermere
- Woodside Acres
- Mosley Plains
- Gasek Farms
- Crystal Ridge

== Demographics ==
Historical population
Census	Pop.	Note	%±
1820	1,196		—
1850	1,399		—
1860	1,510		7.9%
1870	1,452		−3.8%
1880	1,569		8.1%
1890	1,539		−1.9%
1900	1,829		18.8%
1910	1,999		9.3%
1920	2,127		6.4%
1930	2,253		5.9%
1940	2,479		10.0%
1950	3,099		25.0%
1960	5,580		80.1%
1970	7,707		38.1%
1980	9,711		26.0%
1990	11,197		15.3%
2000	12,921		15.4%
2010	15,602		20.7%
2020	16,426		5.3%
U.S. Decennial Census

As of the census of 2000, there were 12,921 people, 5,195 households, and 3,470 families residing in the town. Ellington's population increased 20.8% between 2000 and 2010, making one of just four municipalities in Connecticut to achieve a growth rate of at least 20% for that period. The population density was 379.4 inhabitants per square mile (146.5/km^{2}). There were 5,417 housing units at an average density of 159.1 per square mile (61.4/km^{2}). The racial makeup of the town was 96.23% White, 0.99% African American, 0.16% Native American, 1.29% Asian, 0.01% Pacific Islander, 0.44% from other races, and 0.87% from two or more races. Hispanic or Latino of any race were 1.40% of the population.

There were 5,195 households, out of which 32.5% had children under the age of 18 living with them, 57.4% were married couples living together, 6.6% had a female householder with no husband present, and 33.2% were non-families. 26.8% of all households were made up of individuals, and 6.4% had someone living alone who was 65 years of age or older. The average household size was 2.48 and the average family size was 3.06.

In the town, the population was spread out, with 25.2% under the age of 18, 6.5% from 18 to 24, 35.0% from 25 to 44, 23.6% from 45 to 64, and 9.7% who were 65 years of age or older. The median age was 37 years. For every 100 females, there were 98.9 males. For every 100 females age 18 and over, there were 96.3 males.

The median income for a household in the town was $62,405, and the median income for a family was $77,813. Males had a median income of $47,334 versus $32,460 for females. The per capita income for the town was $27,766. About 2.7% of families and 3.6% of the population were below the poverty line, including 4.1% of those under age 18 and 3.9% of those age 65 or over.

Voter Registration and Party Enrollment as of October 17, 2025
Party	Active Voters	Inactive Voters	Total Voters	Percentage
Republican	3,209	137	3,346	26.99%
Democratic	2,801	126	2,927	23.61%
Unaffiliated	5,623	284	5,907	47.66%
Minor parties	200	15	215	1.74%
Total	11,833	562	12,395	100%

Presidential Election Results
Year	Democratic	Republican	Third Parties
2024	49.6% 4,733	48.9% 4,666	1.5% 145
2020	50.4% 4,787	47.6% 4,515	2.0% 189
2016	43.2% 3,531	51.4% 4,199	5.4% 437
2012	47.3% 3,598	51.2% 3,894	1.5% 114
2008	53.9% 4,236	44.8% 3,519	1.3% 99
2004	47.7% 3,467	50.9% 3,700	1.4% 104
2000	48.9% 3,113	45.7% 2,910	5.4% 339
1996	47.7% 2,643	38.9% 2,152	13.4% 737
1992	34.8% 2,173	35.3% 2,205	29.9% 1,858
1988	42.7% 2,171	56.5% 2,873	0.8% 39
1984	31.9% 1,538	67.5% 3,246	0.6% 23
1980	34.5% 1,599	46.9% 2,172	18.6% 860
1976	45.4% 1,995	54.1% 2,376	0.5% 20
1972	38.7% 1,432	60.6% 2,242	0.7% 23
1968	46.6% 1,328	48.3% 1,377	5.1% 146
1964	69.0% 1,795	31.0% 806	0.00% 0
1960	48.2% 1,246	51.8% 1,340	0.00% 0
1956	36.5% 753	63.5% 1,311	0.00% 0

== Economy ==
Ellington is a rapidly growing community, and is going through the process of suburbanization, which is related to the phenomenon of urban sprawl.

Top employers in Ellington according to the town's 2023 Comprehensive Annual Financial Report

#	Employer	# of Employees
1	Town of Ellington	543
2	Country Pure Foods	196
3	Indian Valley Faily YMCA	118
4	Big Y	112
5	Kloter Farms Country Store	100
6	Earthlight	84
7	LuAnn's Bakery	75
8	Barn Yard/Great Country Garage	68
9	Dymotek	63
10	Oakridge Dairy	56

== Education ==
Ellington Public Schools belong to the Ellington Public Schools school district. The district has five public schools:

=== Elementary schools ===
- Center School (K–6)
- Crystal Lake School (K–6)
- Windermere School (K–6)

=== Middle school ===
- Ellington Middle School, formerly Longview Middle School (7–8)

=== High school ===
- Ellington High School

== Infrastructure ==
=== Roads ===
Though no Interstate Highways pass through Ellington it is approximately equidistant from both Interstate 84 and Interstate 91, each being approximately a ten- to fifteen-minute drive from most parts of town.

Several Connecticut State Roads run through town:

- Route 30 – (Stafford Road) The north–south arterial in the Crystal Lake section of town.
- Route 32 - (River Road) Passes north-south through the very eastern edge of town, connects Willington to Stafford. No direct connections to the rest of town (Though CT 140 in Stafford Springs intersects with it)
- Route 83 – (West Road & Somers Road) The main north–south arterial running through the middle of the town.
- Route 74 – (Wapping Wood Road & Windsorville Road) On the Southern edge of town, a major road in Ellington's Five corners.
- Route 140 – (Sadds Mill Road, Maple Street, Crystal Lake Road, & Sandy Beach Road) The town's main East/West arterial, running the complete width of town.
- Route 286 – (Pinney Street & Main Street) An arterial running North from Five Corners to the center of town where it turns East and becomes Ellington's Main Street

=== Rail ===
Ellington was formerly served by a seven-mile-long rail line built in 1876 running from Vernon to Melrose, that roughly paralleled Pinney Street and Sadds Mill Road The rail line became defunct in the middle part of the 20th century. The New England Central Railroad (following the Willimantic River) also briefly clips through the very eastern edge of Ellington, though has no stops.

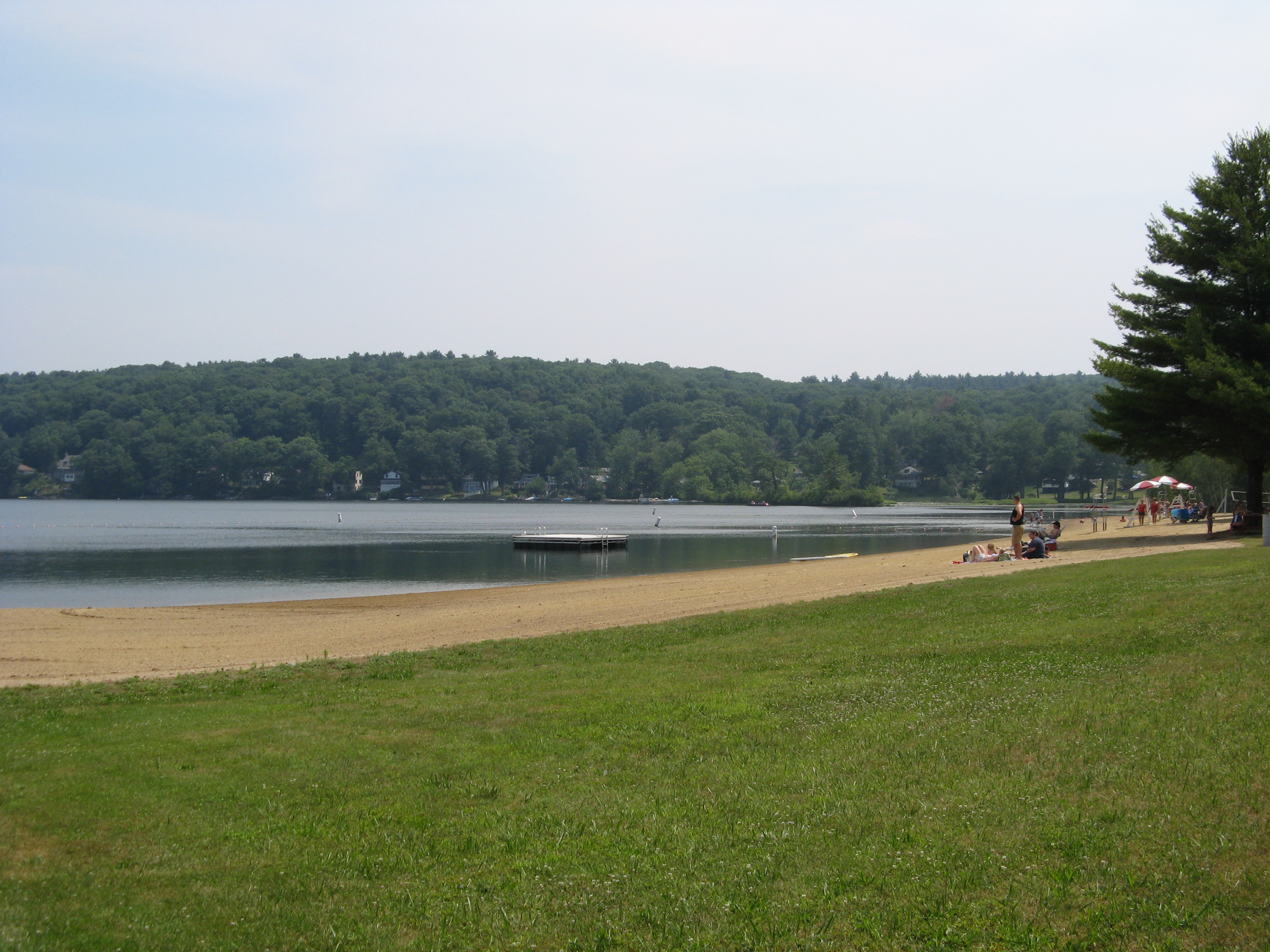
Ellington's town beach, Sandy Beach, located on Crystal Lake

=== Airports ===
- Ellington Airport – A General aviation airport located adjacent to the town's Industrial park on Route 83. In addition to private aviation, a Flight training school and a helicopter school operate there. Parachuting is a common weekend activity from the airport.
- Skylark Airpark – A General aviation airport located in the neighboring town of East Windsor.
- Bradley International Airport – Connecticut's main commercial airport, is located approximately ten miles West of town in Windsor Locks.

=== Water ===
Crystal Lake, in the eastern section of town, is used by many for boating.

== Notable Ellingtonians ==
- John H. Brockway (1801–1870), U.S. Representative
- Henry Billings Brown (1836–1913), US Supreme Court justice
- Orlow W. Chapman (1832–1890), politician; Solicitor General of the United States
- Stephen Jenks (1772–1856), composer of music
- Mike Massaro, NASCAR on NBC pit reporter and journalist
- Mike McGuirl (born 1998) - player for Hapoel Haifa in the Israeli Basketball Premier League
- Frank Mozzicato (born 2003), 7th overall pick of the 2021 MLB draft, signing with the Kansas City Royals
- Steve Park (born 1967), winner in the NASCAR Cup Series on multiple occasions
- Henry Weston Smith (1827–1876), Methodist preacher
- Mike Vranos (born 1961), founder of the investment firm Ellington Management Company

== See also ==
- Congregation Knesseth Israel
- Crystal Lake, Connecticut
- Country Pure Foods
