= Melrose, Connecticut =

- Melrose
- U.S. National Register of Historic Places
- U.S. Historic district
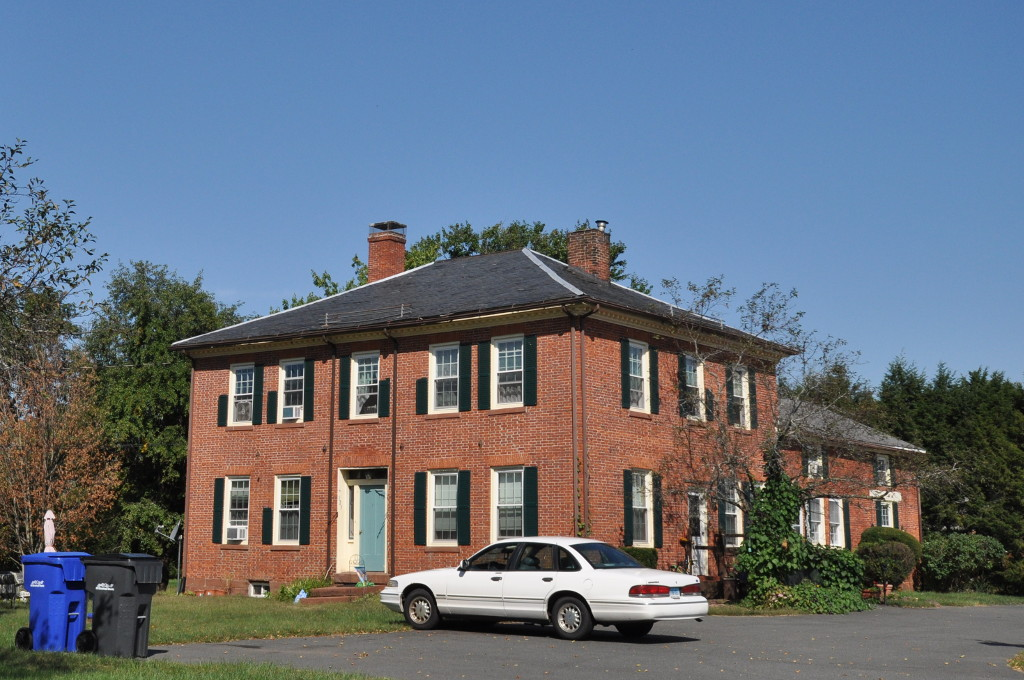

- Location within Connecticut Location within the United States
- Location: Broad Brooks and Melrose Road, East Windsor, Connecticut
- Coordinates: 41°56′15″N 72°31′38″W
- Area: 250 acres (100 ha)
- Architectural style: Early Republic, Mid 19th Century Revival, Late 19th Cent. American
- NRHP reference No.: 10000577
- Added to NRHP: August 26, 2010

Melrose is a rural village in northeastern East Windsor, Connecticut. Centered at the crossroads of Broad Brook Road and Melrose Road, it was settled in the 1700s and developed as an agrarian village center in the 19th century. A landscape of more than 250 acres (100 ha), including farmland, period farmhouses, ruins of a small distillery, and a district schoolhouse (now a library) was listed on the National Register of Historic Places in 2010.

== Description and history ==
Melrose is located in northeastern East Windsor, a historically agricultural town opposite Windsor on the eastern bank of the Connecticut River. The village is well removed from that river, occupying an area bounded on the west by the Scantic River, on the south by Broad Brook, and on the north and east by the neighboring towns of Enfield and Ellington. The village is today little more than a cluster of homes centered on the junction of Broad Brook Road and Melrose Road, extending mainly to the east and west along Melrose Road. Land use patterns in this area are relatively little changed from the 19th century, with houses set relatively near the road and agricultural lands in strips behind them. The principal non-residential elements of the area are a small cemetery, the 19th-century district schoolhouse (which now houses a small library), and the remains of a small distillery on the banks of Broad Brook at the southern edge of the area.

The houses in the district were mostly built in the 19th century, with a number of 20th century intrusions. There are numerous barns and other farm outbuildings in the area, an indicator of its long history of agricultural use. Many of the barns date to the late 19th or early 20th century, but there are a cross-section of older barns as well, illustrating the changing uses of the land over time.

Melrose was first settled in the early 18th century, and was known for a time as "Irish Row" for the Scots and Irish who first settled the area. Early agriculture was primarily for subsistence, but tobacco developed as a major cash crop in the 19th century, and remained a significant force in the local economy into the 20th century. The district schoolhouse was erected in 1850, and served the town until 1938, after which it was adapted for use as a library.

== See also ==
- National Register of Historic Places in Hartford County, Connecticut
