= Crystal Lake, Connecticut =

Census-designated place in Connecticut, United States

Crystal Lake
- Census-designated place
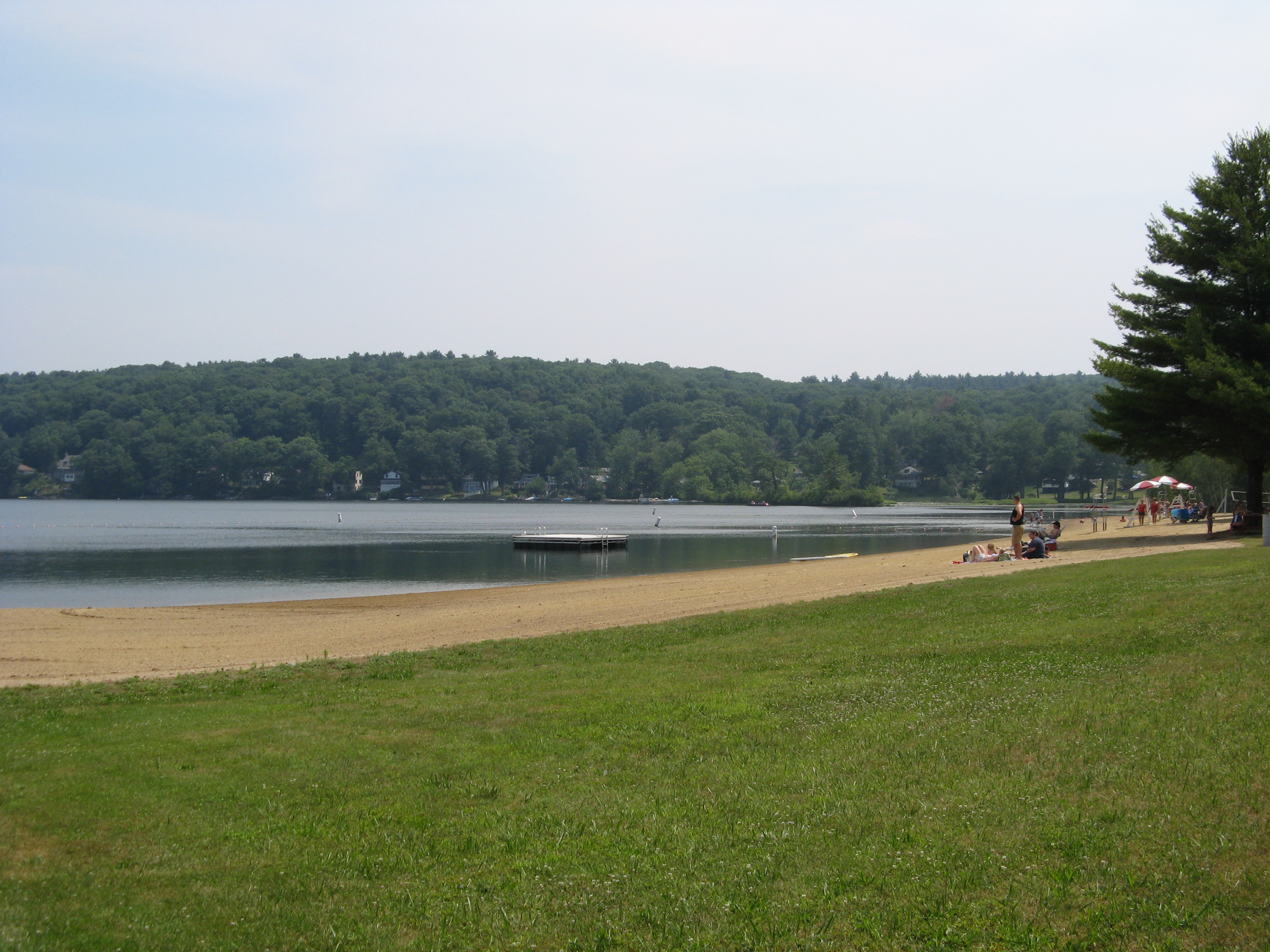
- Ellington's town beach, Sandy Beach

- Location in Tolland County and the state of Connecticut
- Coordinates: 41°56′41″N 72°22′24″W
- Country: United States
- State: Connecticut
- County: Tolland
- Town: Ellington

Area
  - Total: 8.1 sq mi (21 km^{2})
  - Land: 7.8 sq mi (20 km^{2})
  - Water: 0.3 sq mi (0.78 km^{2})
- Elevation: 636 ft (194 m)

Population (2010)
  - Total: 1,945
  - Density: 250/sq mi (96/km^{2})
- Time zone: UTC−5 (Eastern (EST))
  - Summer (DST): UTC−4 (EDT)
- ZIP code: 06029
- Area code: 860
- FIPS code: 09-18220
- GNIS feature ID: 2377812

Crystal Lake is a village, census-designated place, and part of the town of Ellington, in Tolland County, Connecticut, United States. As of the 2020 census, Crystal Lake had a population of 2,152. The CDP includes an eponymous lake.

== Geography ==
The CDP is home to Crystal Lake, a 187-acre (76 ha) lake that straddles the border between Ellington and Stafford. Most of the lake shore is occupied by private residences, but there is a small public beach called Sandy Beach on the southern side of the lake. The lake has an average depth of 20 feet (6.1 m), a maximum depth of 50 feet (15 m) and an elevation of 637 feet (194 m).

According to the United States Census Bureau, the CDP has a total area of 20.9 km^{2} (8.1 mi^{2}), of which 20.2 km^{2} (7.8 mi^{2}) is land and 0.7 km^{2} (0.3 mi^{2}) (3.35%) is water.

== Demographics ==
=== 2020 census ===
As of the 2020 census, Crystal Lake had a population of 2,152. The median age was 42.5 years. 22.9% of residents were under the age of 18 and 16.5% of residents were 65 years of age or older. For every 100 females there were 98.9 males, and for every 100 females age 18 and over there were 96.8 males age 18 and over.

There were 783 households in Crystal Lake, of which 34.4% had children under the age of 18 living in them. Of all households, 66.0% were married-couple households, 13.5% were households with a male householder and no spouse or partner present, and 15.6% were households with a female householder and no spouse or partner present. About 18.1% of all households were made up of individuals and 7.1% had someone living alone who was 65 years of age or older.

There were 887 housing units, of which 11.7% were vacant. The homeowner vacancy rate was 2.2% and the rental vacancy rate was 16.3%.

0.0% of residents lived in urban areas, while 100.0% lived in rural areas.

Racial composition as of the 2020 census
Race	Number	Percent
White	1,914	88.9%
Black or African American	39	1.8%
American Indian and Alaska Native	2	0.1%
Asian	59	2.7%
Native Hawaiian and Other Pacific Islander	0	0.0%
Some other race	17	0.8%
Two or more races	121	5.6%
Hispanic or Latino (of any race)	55	2.6%

=== 2000 census ===
As of the census of 2000, there were 1,459 people, 552 households, and 421 families residing in the CDP. The population density was 72.2/km^{2} (187.1/mi^{2}). There were 634 housing units at an average density of 31.4/km^{2} (81.3/mi^{2}). The racial makeup of the CDP was 97.67% White, 0.41% African American, 0.07% Native American, 0.82% Asian, 0.21% from other races, and 0.82% from two or more races. Hispanic or Latino of any race were 1.03% of the population.

There were 552 households, out of which 36.1% had children under the age of 18 living with them, 64.3% were married couples living together, 7.6% had a female householder with no husband present, and 23.7% were non-families. 17.2% of all households were made up of individuals, and 5.3% had someone living alone who was 65 years of age or older. The average household size was 2.64 and the average family size was 3.00.

In the CDP, the population was spread out, with 26.3% under the age of 18, 4.0% from 18 to 24, 34.3% from 25 to 44, 25.7% from 45 to 64, and 9.7% who were 65 years of age or older. The median age was 38 years. For every 100 females, there were 100.4 males. For every 100 females age 18 and over, there were 100.6 males.

The median income for a household in the CDP was $61,897, and the median income for a family was $69,375. Males had a median income of $46,393 versus $36,944 for females. The per capita income for the CDP was $24,645. About 5.6% of families and 7.9% of the population were below the poverty line, including 13.2% of those under age 18 and 2.8% of those age 65 or over.
