= Broad Brook, Connecticut =

- Census-designated place
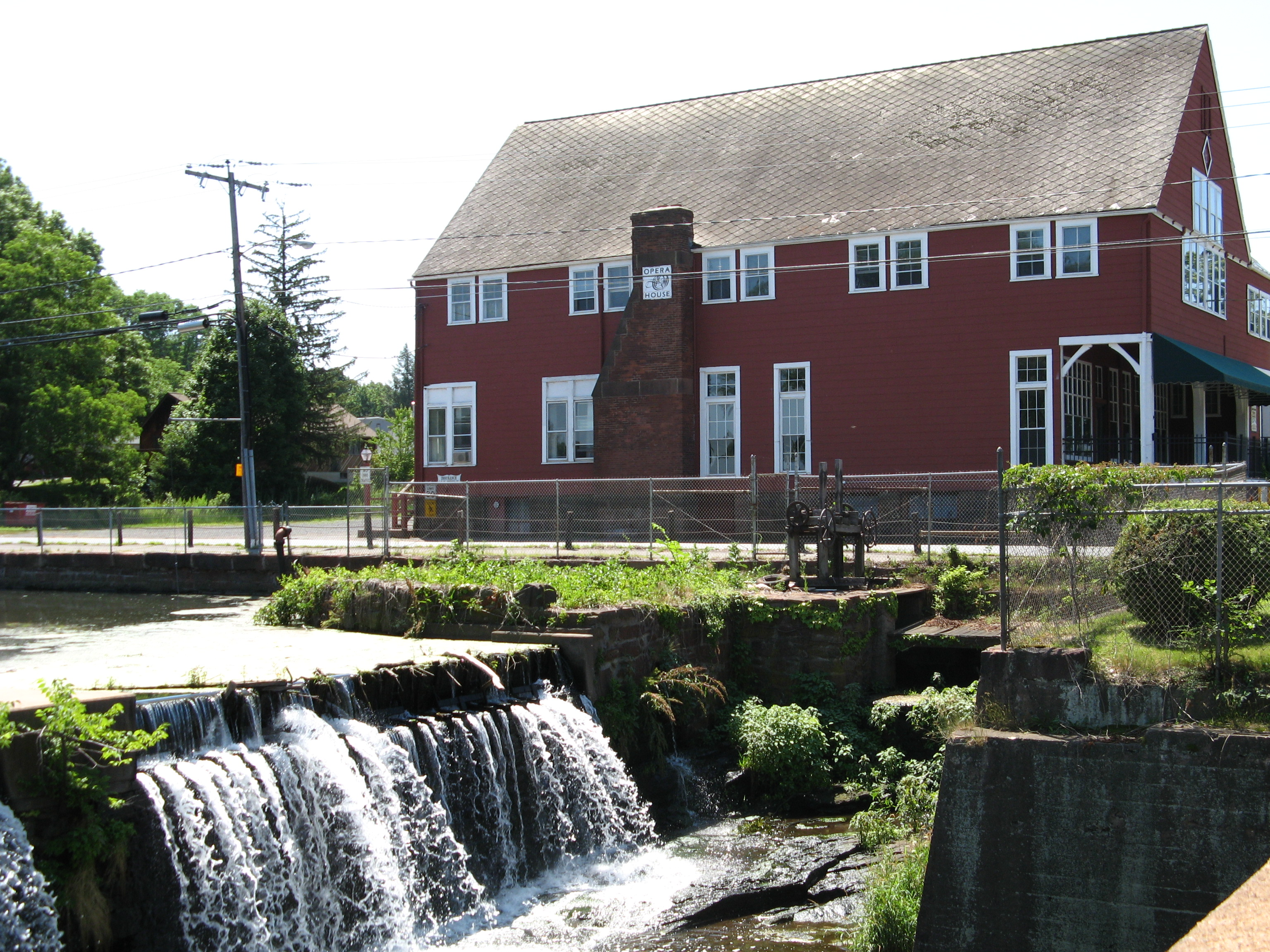
- The Broad Brook dam and Opera House

- Location within Connecticut Location within the United States
- Coordinates: 41°54′44″N 72°32′42″W
- Country: United States
- State: Connecticut
- County: Hartford
- Town: East Windsor

Area
  - Total: 5.9 sq mi (15.4 km^{2})
  - Land: 5.9 sq mi (15.3 km^{2})
  - Water: 0.039 sq mi (0.1 km^{2})
- Elevation: 130 ft (40 m)

Population (2010)
  - Total: 4,069
  - Density: 687/sq mi (265.2/km^{2})
- Time zone: UTC-5 (Eastern)
  - Summer (DST): UTC-4 (Eastern)
- ZIP code: 06016
- Area Code: 860
- FIPS code: 09-08770
- GNIS feature ID: 2378339

Broad Brook is a neighborhood and census-designated place (CDP) in the town of East Windsor, Hartford County, Connecticut, United States. As of the 2020 census, Broad Brook had a population of 3,998.

== Geography ==
The Broad Brook CDP occupies most of the east-central part of the town of East Windsor. It is bordered to the east by the town of Ellington in Tolland County, to the south by Chamberlain Road and Ketch Brook, to the west by the Scantic River, and to the north by Connecticut Route 140 and a portion of Broad Brook, the community's namesake waterway.

The community is 11 miles (18 km) north of East Hartford and 7 miles (11 km) south of Thompsonville.

According to the United States Census Bureau, the CDP has a total area of 5.9 square miles (15.4 km^{2}), of which 5.9 square miles (15.3 km^{2}) is land and 0.039 square miles (0.1 km^{2}), or 0.58%, is water.

== Demographics ==
=== 2020 census ===
As of the 2020 census, Broad Brook had a population of 3,998. The median age was 44.7 years. 18.7% of residents were under the age of 18 and 18.0% of residents were 65 years of age or older. For every 100 females there were 92.5 males, and for every 100 females age 18 and over there were 91.4 males age 18 and over.

80.7% of residents lived in urban areas, while 19.3% lived in rural areas.

There were 1,778 households in Broad Brook, of which 27.3% had children under the age of 18 living in them. Of all households, 42.0% were married-couple households, 17.4% were households with a male householder and no spouse or partner present, and 31.7% were households with a female householder and no spouse or partner present. About 28.7% of all households were made up of individuals and 12.1% had someone living alone who was 65 years of age or older.

There were 1,914 housing units, of which 7.1% were vacant. The homeowner vacancy rate was 1.6% and the rental vacancy rate was 5.7%.

Racial composition as of the 2020 census
Race	Number	Percent
White	3,041	76.1%
Black or African American	351	8.8%
American Indian and Alaska Native	8	0.2%
Asian	90	2.3%
Native Hawaiian and Other Pacific Islander	0	0.0%
Some other race	232	5.8%
Two or more races	276	6.9%
Hispanic or Latino (of any race)	446	11.2%

=== 2000 census ===
As of the 2000 census, there were 3,469 people, 1,433 households, and 932 families residing in the CDP. The population density was 586.2 inhabitants per square mile (226.3/km^{2}). There were 1,589 housing units at an average density of 268.5 per square mile (103.7/km^{2}). The racial makeup of the CDP was 91.76% White, 4.44% African American, 1.53% Asian, 1.04% from other races, and 1.24% from two or more races. Hispanic or Latino of any race were 2.16% of the population.

There were 1,433 households, out of which 33.4% had children under the age of 18 living with them, 51.2% were married couples living together, 10.3% had a female householder with no husband present, and 34.9% were non-families. 28.3% of all households were made up of individuals, and 9.6% had someone living alone who was 65 years of age or older. The average household size was 2.42 and the average family size was 3.00.

In the CDP, the population was spread out, with 45.5% under the age of 18, 6.7% from 18 to 24, 34.4% from 25 to 44, 21.5% from 45 to 64, and 11.6% who were 65 years of age or older. The median age was 37 years. For every 100 females, there were 93.5 males. For every 100 females age 18 and over, there were 89.5 males.

The median income for a household in the CDP was $50,417, and the median income for a family was $58,138. Males had a median income of $38,222 versus $32,250 for females. The per capita income for the CDP was $23,244. About 3.5% of families and 4.6% of the population were below the poverty line, including 4.0% of those under age 18 and 7.6% of those age 65 or over.

== Notable residents ==
- Jerry Marquis, NASCAR 2000 Featherlite Modified champion
