= East Windsor, Connecticut =

- Town
- Town of East Windsor
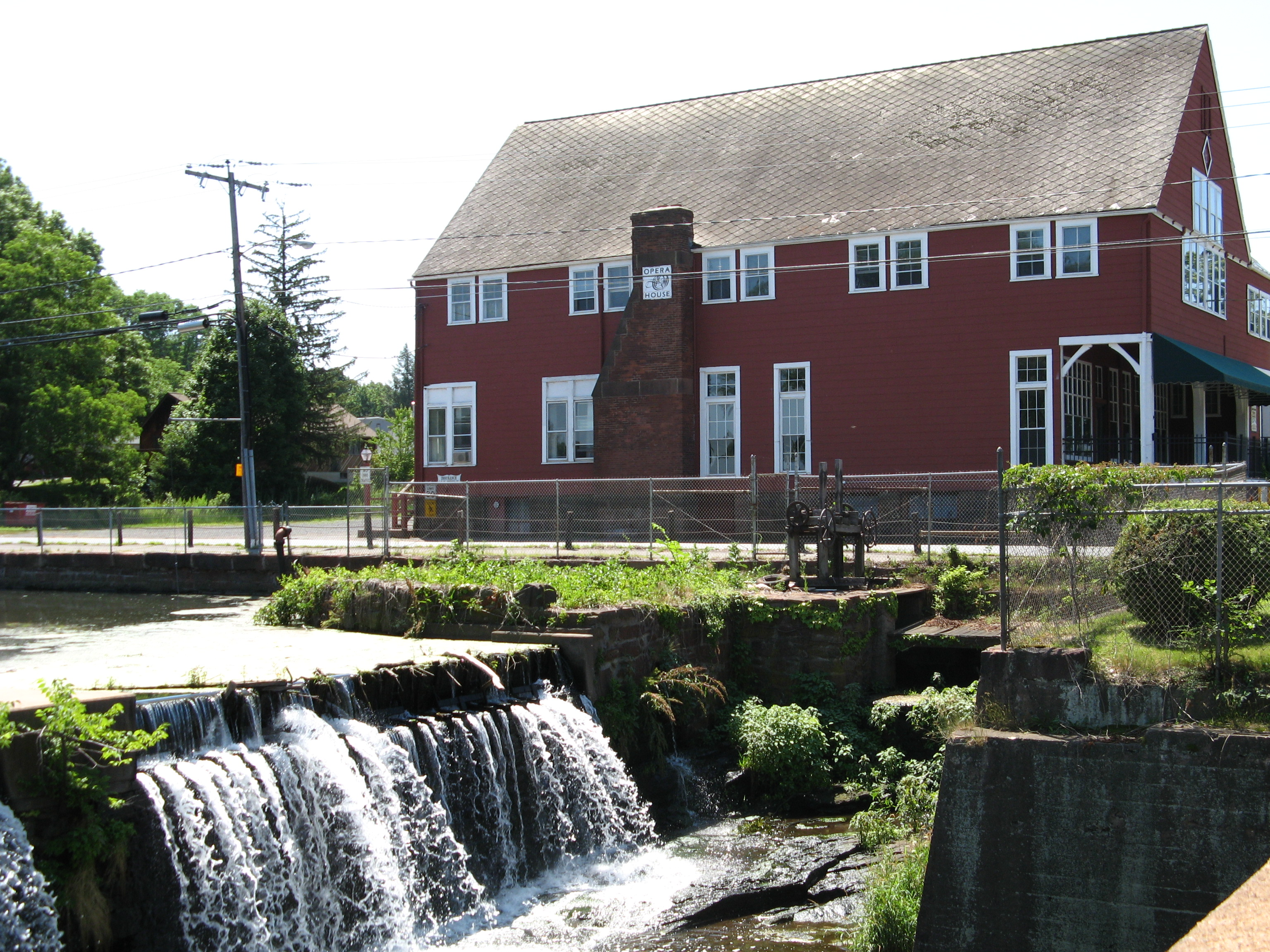
- The dam and Opera House in the Broad Brook section of town

- Seal
- Nickname: East Side/East Borough/E-Dubb
- Motto(s): Unity, Strength
- Interactive map of East Windsor, Connecticut
- Coordinates: 41°55′00″N 72°33′28″W
- Country: United States
- U.S. state: Connecticut
- County: Hartford
- Region: Capitol Region
- Settled: 1680
- Incorporated: 1768
- Villages: Broad Brook; Melrose; Scantic; Warehouse Point; Windsorville

Government
  - Type: Selectman-town meeting
  - First Selectman: Jason E. Bowsza (D)
  - Selectmen: Marie DeSousa (D); Alan Baker (D); Sarah Muska (R); Charlie Nordell (R)

Area
  - Total: 26.8 sq mi (69.5 km^{2})
  - Land: 26.3 sq mi (68.0 km^{2})
  - Water: 0.58 sq mi (1.5 km^{2})
- Elevation: 49 ft (15 m)

Population (2020)
  - Total: 11,190
  - Density: 426/sq mi (165/km^{2})
- Time zone: UTC-5 (Eastern)
  - Summer (DST): UTC-4 (Eastern)
- ZIP Codes: 06016, 06088
- Area codes: 860/959
- FIPS code: 09-24800
- GNIS feature ID: 0212329
- Website: www.eastwindsor-ct.gov

East Windsor is a town in Hartford County, Connecticut, United States. The town is part of the Capitol Planning Region. The population was 11,190 at the 2020 census. The town has five villages: Broad Brook, Melrose, Scantic, Warehouse Point and Windsorville.

== History ==
In 1633, Settlers laid claim to the area now known as Windsor, which included East Windsor. No English settlers lived on the east side of the river. The first English settler in what is today known as East Windsor, was William Pynchon, the founder of Springfield, Massachusetts. In 1636, he erected a warehouse for his settlement's transshipment of goods at what is now known as "Warehouse Point". Warehouse Point served as the southern border of Springfield, Massachusetts, for 132 years—until 1768—when Warehouse Point, Connecticut, was annexed by the Connecticut Colony. Pynchon selected the site of Warehouse Point because of its location near the Enfield Falls—the first major falls in the Connecticut River, the head of navigation where seagoing vessels were forced to terminate their voyages and transship to smaller shallops. By constructing a warehouse at Warehouse Point, Pynchon essentially forced all northern Connecticut River business to run through him and his settlement at Springfield.

Meanwhile, most of today's East Windsor was part of the prominent Windsor settlement on the east side of the river. Settlers avoided the East Side of the river due to the Podunk tribe who inhabited the area, particularly following King Philip's War in 1675. Simon Wolcott was the first settler in today's East Windsor. East Windsor also included today's Ellington and South Windsor. Eventually on May 10, 1768, The East Windsor parish was partitioned from Windsor. The center of town became what is now East Windsor Hill in today's South Windsor. The North Part of town center was Scantic.

In 1818, resident Solomon Ellsworth Jr, was blasting a hole for a well alongside his house in town. While in the process, he found some odd bones. These bones would later be sent to Yale University and eventually be identified as Dinosaur fossils, specifically one of an Anchisaurus. Though not the first fossils to be found, their discovery led to the dinosaur discovery craze later in the century as these were the first bones to be known as a dinosaur, four years before William Buckland determined it. The bones are still at Yale and the Ellsworth Homestead still stands on Rye Street near the South Windsor line.

In 1832, the Broad Brook Mill was created at the waterfall of the Mill Pond.

The town has five sections of town, Warehouse Point, Broad Brook, Scantic, Melrose, and Windsorville. The oldest section of town is Warehouse Point, which, as mentioned, was first used by William Pynchon in the 1630s, and later settled as part of Springfield in the 1680s. The Scantic section of town was the center of town until the mills were built. The Windsorville section of town was once its own community, featuring a church, post office, mini-mart, and a park. Mulnite Farms is a tobacco farm on Graham Road, established in 1905. In 1897, the town's voluntary fire department was created in the mill. The Broad Brook Elementary school was established in 1951. In 1961, the town hall burned down. The new town hall is on Rye Street, across from the elementary school. The new volunteer fire department building and senior center was built on the same site of the old town hall. On Memorial Day Weekend 1986, the Broad Brook Mill caught on fire during renovations, with the mill and the tire shop (on the site of the mill) burned down and the smoke being seen as far as Bradley International Airport and Hartford. A new mini strip mall was built on the site of the mill.

== Geography ==
According to the United States Census Bureau, the town has a total area of 26.8 square miles (69.5 km^{2}), of which 26.3 square miles (68.0 km^{2}) is land and 0.58 square miles (1.5 km^{2}), or 2.11%, is water.

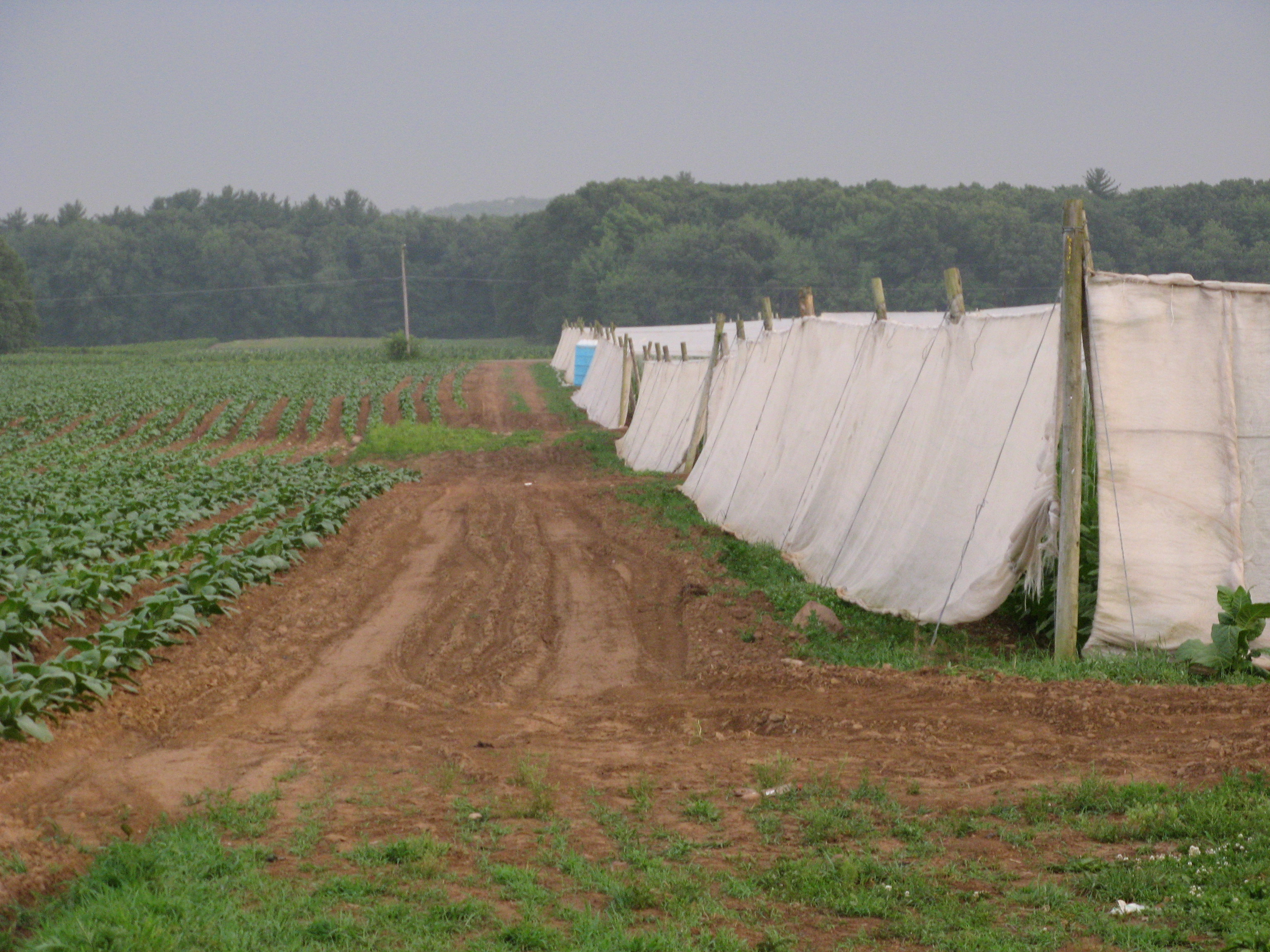
Tobacco field in the Windsorville section of town

East Windsor is bordered by the town of Enfield to the north, South Windsor to the south, Ellington to the east, and Windsor Locks and Windsor to the west, across the Connecticut River.

By virtue of its location on the Connecticut River, Windsor functioned as a vital port. Merchants on both sides of the river shipped timber products, brick, livestock, wheat, tobacco and other produce to supply plantations in the West Indies, importing sugar, molasses, salt, and British manufactured textiles, ceramics, hardware and glass on return trips. Windsor's Hooker and Chaffee mercantile firm maintained a store and packing houses right off Windsor's Palisado Green. Small scale shipbuilding took place at the mouth of the Scantic River in what is now South Windsor, Warehouse Point in what is now East Windsor, and along the Farmington from as far upriver as today's village of Poquonock.

== Demographics ==
Historical population
Census	Pop.	Note	%±
1820	3,400		—
1840	3,600		—
1850	2,633		−26.9%
1860	2,580		−2.0%
1870	2,882		11.7%
1880	3,019		4.8%
1890	2,890		−4.3%
1900	3,158		9.3%
1910	3,362		6.5%
1920	3,741		11.3%
1930	3,815		2.0%
1940	3,967		4.0%
1950	4,859		22.5%
1960	7,500		54.4%
1970	8,513		13.5%
1980	8,925		4.8%
1990	10,081		13.0%
2000	9,818		−2.6%
2010	11,162		13.7%
2020	11,190		0.3%
U.S. Decennial Census

As of the census of 2000, there were 9,818 people, 4,078 households, and 2,556 families residing in the town. The population density was 373.5 inhabitants per square mile (144.2/km^{2}). There were 4,356 housing units at an average density of 165.7 per square mile (64.0/km^{2}). The racial makeup of the town was 91.47% White, 4.09% African American, 0.16% Native American, 2.00% Asian, 0.04% Pacific Islander, 0.83% from other races, and 1.41% from two or more races. Hispanic or Latino of any race were 2.11% of the population.

There were 4,078 households, out of which 27.5% had children under the age of 18 living with them, 48.7% were married couples living together, 10.1% had a female householder with no husband present, and 37.3% were non-families. 30.0% of all households were made up of individuals, and 9.5% had someone living alone who was 65 years of age or older. The average household size was 2.34 and the average family size was 2.94.

In the town, the population was spread out, with 22.2% under the age of 18, 6.2% from 18 to 24, 33.1% from 25 to 44, 23.8% from 45 to 64, and 14.7% who were 65 years of age or older. The median age was 39 years. For every 100 females, there were 96.4 males. For every 100 females age 18 and over, there were 92.6 males.

The median income for a household in the town was $51,092, and the median income for a family was $60,694. Males had a median income of $39,785 versus $33,446 for females. The per capita income for the town was $24,899. About 3.5% of families and 4.1% of the population were below the poverty line, including 2.9% of those under age 18 and 4.6% of those age 65 or over.

== Government and politics ==
Voter Registration and Party Enrollment as of October 31, 2024
Party	Active Voters	Inactive Voters	Total Voters	Percentage
Democratic	2,612	86	2,698	28.33%
Republican	2,028	69	2,097	22.02%
Unaffiliated	4,421	150	4,571	48.00%
Minor parties	148	8	156	1.64%
Total	9,209	313	9,522	100%

=== Elections ===
East Windsor town vote by party in presidential elections
Year	Democratic	Republican	Third Parties
2020	53.22% 3,008	44.96% 2,541	1.82% 103
2016	46.05% 2,441	49.16% 2,606	4.79% 254
2012	56.84% 2,857	42.02% 2,112	1.13% 57
2008	58.81% 3,106	39.77% 2,100	1.42% 75
2004	54.34% 2,571	43.84% 2,074	1.82% 86
2000	54.60% 2,313	39.50% 1,673	5.90% 250
1996	52.42% 2,104	32.26% 1,295	15.32% 615
1992	39.25% 1,891	33.17% 1,598	27.58% 1,329
1988	48.36% 1,940	50.52% 2,027	1.12% 45
1984	38.45% 1,454	61.26% 2,317	0.29% 11
1980	41.82% 1,572	43.31% 1,628	14.87% 559
1976	53.26% 1,926	46.29% 1,674	0.44% 16
1972	44.48% 1,536	54.24% 1,873	1.27% 44
1968	50.22% 1,595	42.79% 1,359	6.99% 222
1964	69.37% 2,172	30.63% 959	0.00% 0
1960	54.28% 1,673	45.72% 1,409	0.00% 0
1956	37.15% 1,039	62.85% 1,758	0.00% 0

Election results from statewide races
Year	Office	Results
2018	Governor	Stefanowski 52.06–41.47%
2018	U.S. Senator	Murphy 52.44–46.50%
2018	U.S. Representative	Larson 53.54–45.15%
2016	President	Trump 49.16–46.05%
2016	U.S. Senator	Blumenthal 58.72–38.88%
2016	U.S. Representative	Larson 54.91–42.65%
2014	Governor	Foley 53.71–44.71%
2014	U.S. Representative	Larson 54.57–43.42%
2012	President	Obama 56.8–42.0%
2012	U.S. Senator	Murphy 52.3–45.4%
2012	U.S. Representative	Larson 65.1–32.7%
2010	Governor	Foley 56.0–42.0%
2010	U.S. Senator	Blumenthal 50.7–47.4%
2010	U.S. Representative	Larson 53.1–45.3%
2008	President	Obama 58.8–39.8%
2008	U.S. Representative	Larson 69.6–27.1%
2006	Governor	Rell 63.8–34.7%
2006	U.S. Senator	Lieberman 46.8–39.8–12.5%
2006	U.S. Representative	Larson 71.7–28.3%
2004	President	Kerry 54.3–43.8%
2004	U.S. Senator	Dodd 66.8–31.1%
2004	U.S. Representative	Larson 56.8–43.2%

== Education ==
=== Elementary ===
East Windsor Elementary School System serves students in pre-kindergarten through grade four. The Connecticut Children's Place runs from grade five through grade 12. Its principal is Joyce Welch. Homebound schooling runs from Pre-K through 12. The Broad Brook Elementary School principal is Laura Foxx.

=== Middle school ===
East Windsor Middle School serves students in grades five through eight. Its principal is Timothy Field.

=== High school ===
East Windsor High School serves students in grades nine through twelve. Its principal is Allison Anderson.

== Transportation ==
U.S. Route 5 runs through the town from the border with South Windsor to Enfield.

East Windsor is halfway between Hartford and Springfield, each 12 miles (19 km) away. Interstate 91 serves East Windsor with exits 44 and 45. Windsor Locks station is the nearest passenger train station.

Bradley International Airport is 5 miles (8 km) away. Skylark Airport is a small airstrip to help young aviators learn how to fly.

== Crime ==
Graph of East Windsor Crime Statistics

East Windsor crime, according to city-data.com is relatively low against U.S. averages. Between 1999 and 2004, not including 2003, there was one murder, 26 rapes, 43 robberies, 41 assaults, 254 burglaries, 1248 thefts, and 177 car thefts.

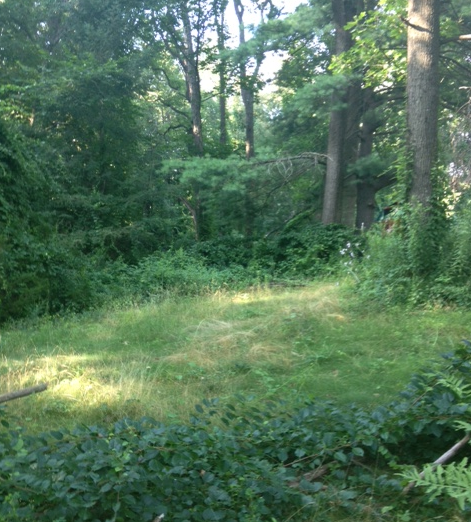
The Woods near the Scantic River

== Points of interest ==
- The Connecticut Trolley Museum and the Connecticut Fire Museum are located in the Warehouse Point section of town.
- The East Windsor Academy Museum operated by the historical society is located in the Scantic neighborhood.
- The East Windsor Hill section of the nearby town of South Windsor was the boyhood home of the theologian Jonathan Edwards.
- The Melrose School, now called the Melrose Library, is a one-room schoolhouse that was active until the early 20th century. It is located in the Melrose section of town and is now used for local functions.
- St. John's Episcopal Church (Warehouse Point, Connecticut) is on the National Register of Historic Places.

== Notable people ==
- Lorrin Andrews, Congregational Church clergyman missionary to Hawaii, judge, and first Associate Justice of Hawaii State Supreme Court
- John Warner Barber, engraver whose books of state, national, and local history featured his vivid engravings
- Israel Bissell, post-rider who alerted the colonists of the British attack on April 19, 1775
- Daniel Bissell, Soldier and spy for the Continental Army during the American Revolutionary War
- Samuel Robbins Brown, missionary to China and Japan with the Dutch Reformed Church
- Eliphalet Chapin, cabinetmaker and furniture maker
- Aaron Civale, pitcher for the Milwaukee Brewers
- Jonathan Edwards, theologian
- Frederick Holbrook, Governor of Vermont
- Jerry Marquis, former NASCAR driver
- Walter Loomis Newberry, businessman and philanthropist
- Ryan Preece, NASCAR driver
- Eli Terry, first inventor to receive a United States patent for a clock mechanism
- Lizabeth A. Turner (1829–1907), National President, Woman's Relief Corps
- Erastus Wolcott, 18th-century member of the Connecticut General Assembly representing East Windsor
