= Massachusetts Route 147 =

State highway in Hampden County, Massachusetts, US

Route 147
- Route 147 highlighted in red

Route information
- Maintained by MassDOT
- Length: 4.23 mi (6.81 km)
- Existed: 1966–present

Major junctions
- West end: Springfield Street in Agawam
- Route 75 / Route 159 in Agawam
- East end: US 5 / Memorial Bridge in West Springfield

Location
- Country: United States
- State: Massachusetts
- Counties: Hampden

Highway system
- Massachusetts State Highway System; Interstate; US; State
← Route 146	→ Route 148

Route 147 is a 4.23-mile-long (6.81 km) east–west state highway in Massachusetts. It runs from Agawam east to U.S. Route 5 (US 5) in West Springfield. It follows the easternmost few miles of the former route of Route 57 before it was moved onto a freeway a mile south, the Henry E. Bodurtha Highway, completed in 1966.

== Route description ==
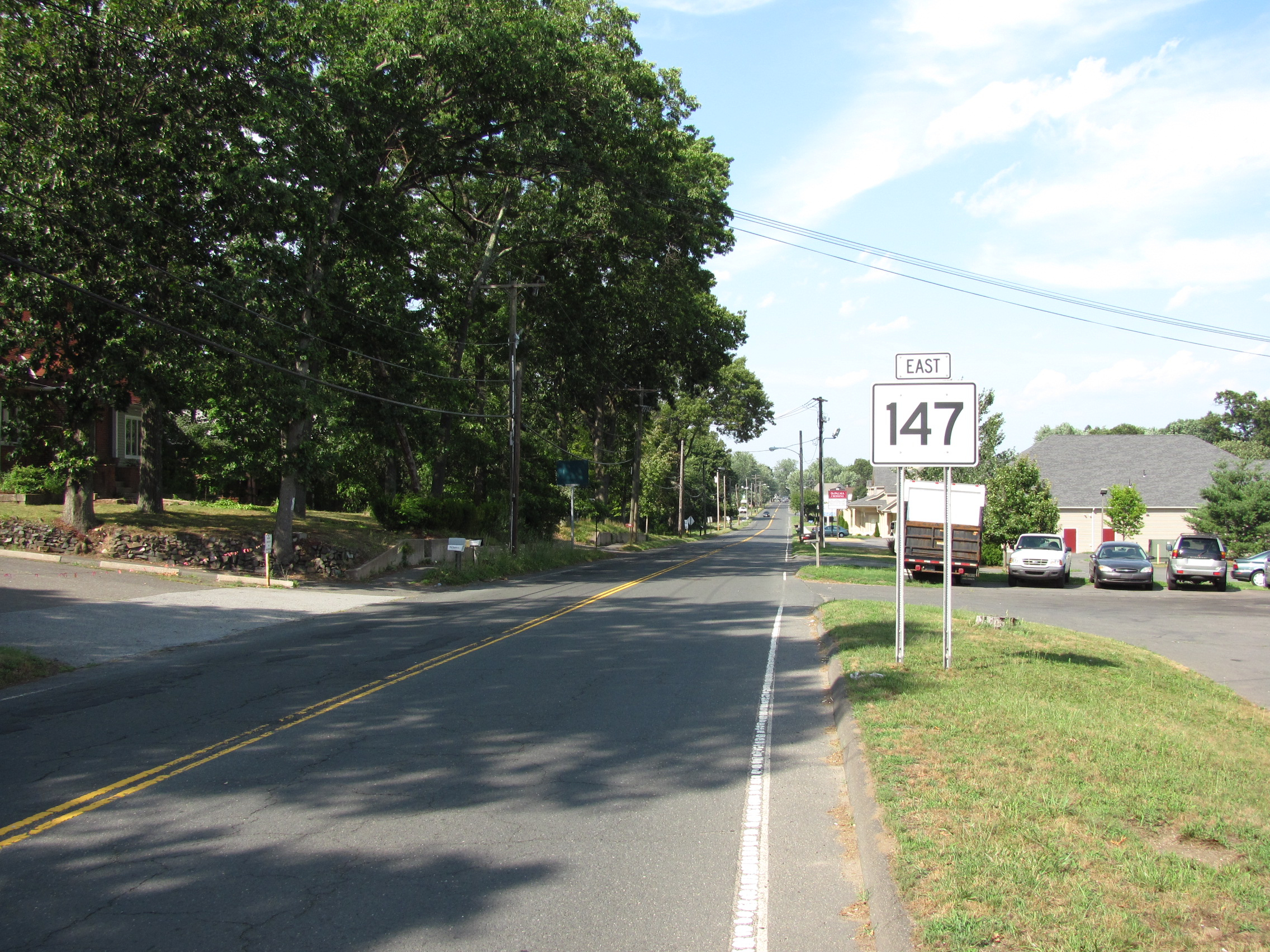
Route 147 eastbound in Feeding Hills

Route 147 begins in Agawam as a continuation of Springfield Street. The route runs northeast for two miles (3 km) then turns east at the intersection with North Street. Route 147 follows Springfield Street to an intersection with Route 75 (Suffield Street) and Route 159 (Main Street). Routes 75 and 159 are both continuations of Connecticut routes having the same number that enter Massachusetts four miles (6 km) to the south. At the intersection, Route 147 takes a left turn onto the Anne Sullivan bridge over the Westfield River and enters West Springfield.

Route 147 in West Springfield follows Memorial Avenue east-northeast past the Eastern States Exposition grounds, where the agricultural state fair for the six New England states meets each year. The route continues down Memorial Avenue past the large former Boston and Albany, now CSX, rail freight yard. Route 147 then continues past the Century Center shopping center before ending at US 5 (Riverdale Street) at a rotary adjacent to the Memorial Bridge over the Connecticut River into Springfield.

== Major intersections ==
The entire route is in Hampden County.

Location	mi	km	Destinations	Notes
Agawam	0.000	0.000	To Route 57 – Feeding Hills, Southwick	Western terminus; access via Springfield Street
Agawam	2.477	3.986	Route 75 south / Route 159 south – Suffield CT, Agawam Center	Northern termini of Routes 75 and 159
West Springfield	4.230	6.808	US 5 (Riverdale Street) / Memorial Bridge – Springfield, Agawam, Longmeadow, Holyoke	Roundabout; eastern terminus
1.000 mi = 1.609 km; 1.000 km = 0.621 mi
