= Massachusetts Route 57 =

East-west state highway in Massachusetts, US

Route 57
- Route 57 highlighted in red

Route information
- Maintained by MassDOT
- Length: 45.42 mi (73.10 km)
- Existed: by 1930–present

Major junctions
- West end: Route 23 / Route 183 in Monterey
- Route 8 in Sandisfield; US 202 / Route 10 in Southwick
- East end: US 5 / I-91 in Agawam

Location
- Country: United States
- State: Massachusetts
- Counties: Berkshire, Hampden

Highway system
- Massachusetts State Highway System; Interstate; US; State
← Route 56	→ Route 58

Route 57 is a 45.42-mile-long (73.10 km) east–west Massachusetts state route that runs from Monterey to Agawam. The eastern 5.0 miles (8.1 km) in Agawam is a freeway that runs from Route 187 to the route's eastern terminus at U.S. Route 5.

== Route description ==
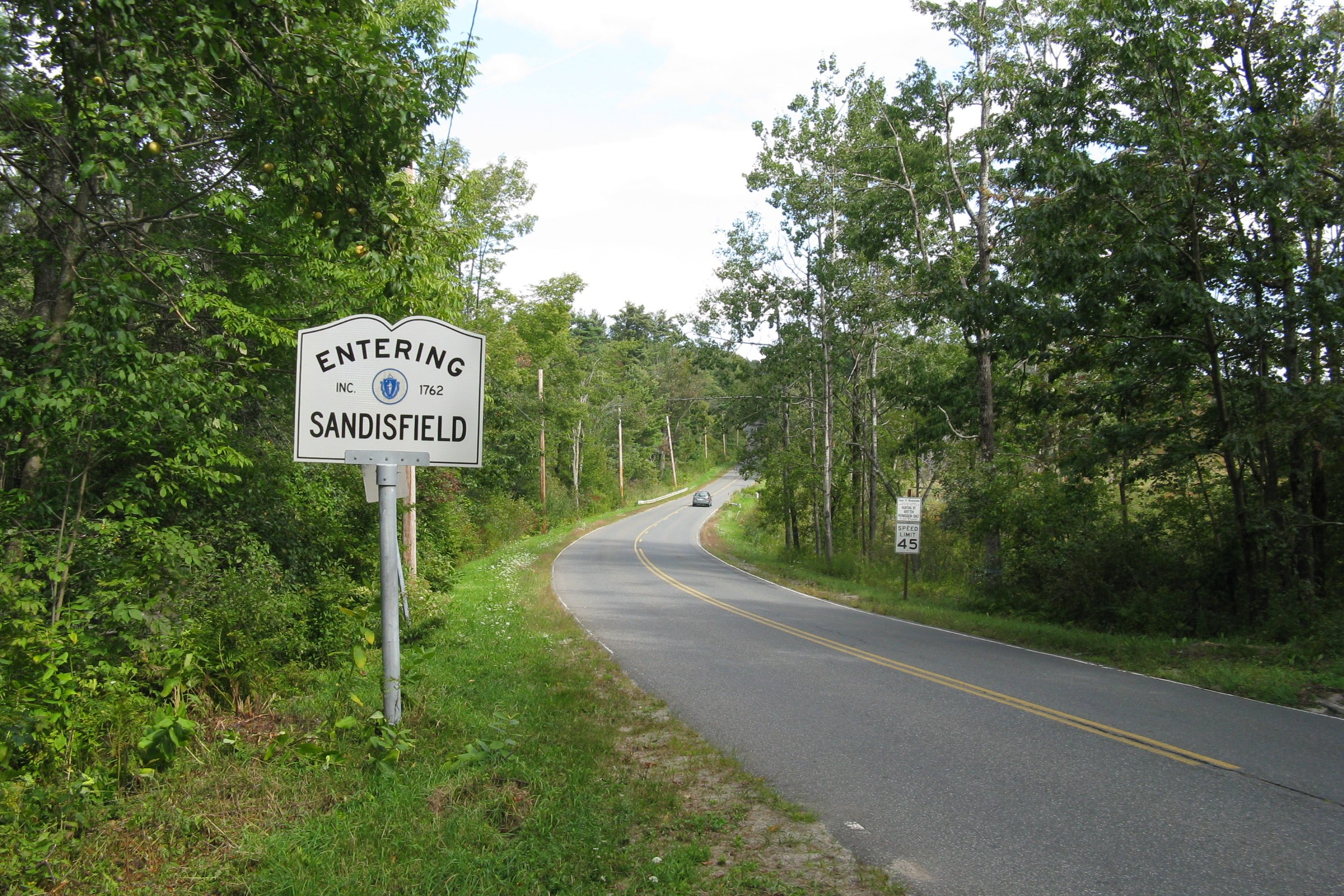
Eastbound entering Sandisfield

The route begins in Monterey, at its intersection with routes 23 and 183. The section from there to New Marlborough (which is a concurrency with Route 183) primarily takes a southeastern path that passes several stretches of farmland. In New Marlborough, Route 57 splits from Route 183 and follows a mainly easterly route with frequent curves, passing more farmland. During this stretch, there is a brief concurrency with Route 8 in Sandisfield to cross the Farmington River's west branch.

In Southwick, Route 57 starts to enter a more suburban area. There are more concurrencies during this stretch, first with U.S. Route 202 and Massachusetts Route 10 in Southwick, and then with Route 187 in Agawam.

When Route 57 splits off from Route 187, it becomes a freeway, the Henry E. Bodurtha Highway. It has five exits before terminating in a rotary that is served by an interchange from U.S. Route 5.

== History ==
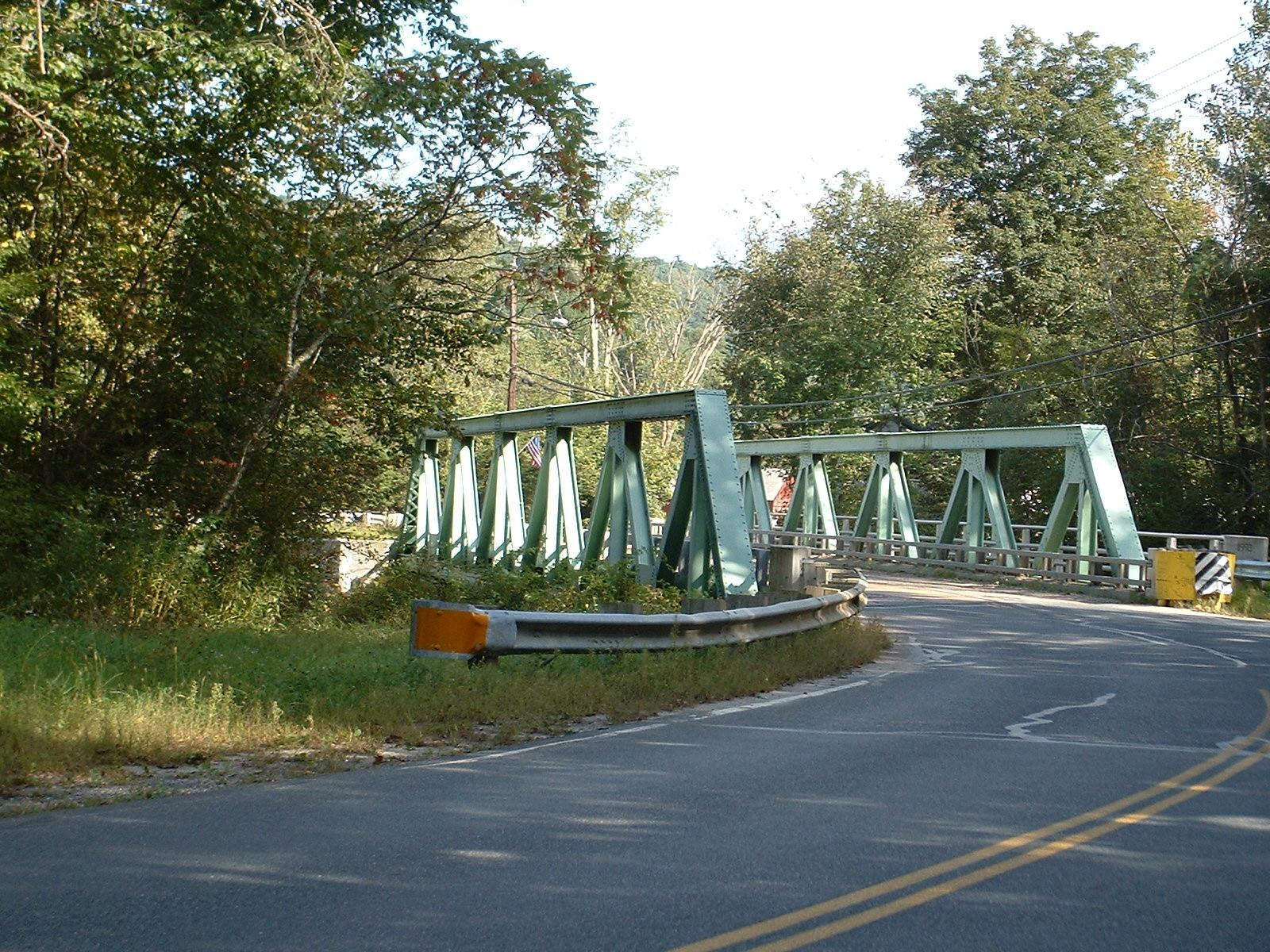
Crossing the Clam River in Sandisfield

Route 57 (which was formed by 1930) initially went from Southwick to West Springfield. It was extended to Sandisfield in the mid-1930s and Monterey in the late 1940s.

Construction on the freeway portion began in 1958, with the first portion (to today's Route 159, then called Route 5A) opening in 1961. It was extended to past Route 75 in 1966, with Route 57 being moved to the freeway around this time (the old alignment became Route 147). In 1991, work to extend the freeway to Route 187 began, with the new section opening in 1995. A further extension to Southwick has been proposed, but it was put on hold by then-Governor Mitt Romney in June 2005; nevertheless, Agawam's city council continues to urge the state to construct the extension. The MA 57 freeway exits do not have numbers.

== Major intersections ==
County	Location	mi	km	Destinations	Notes
Berkshire	Monterey	0.0	0.0	Route 23 / Route 183 north – Great Barrington, Lenox, Monterey	Western terminus; western end of Route 183 concurrency
Berkshire	New Marlborough	6.0	9.7	Route 183 south (South Sandisfield Road) – Colebrook, CT	Eastern end of Route 183 concurrency
Berkshire	Sandisfield	15.2	24.5	Route 8 – Otis, Winsted, CT	
Hampden	Granville	27.8	44.7	Route 189 south – Granby, CT, Hartford, CT	Northern terminus of Route 189
Hampden	Southwick	34.3	55.2	US 202 south / Route 10 south – Granby, CT	Western end of US 202/Route 10 concurrency
Hampden	Southwick	34.9	56.2	US 202 north / Route 10 north – Westfield	Eastern end of US 202/Route 10 concurrency
Hampden	Agawam	39.6	63.7	Route 187 north – Westfield	Western end of Route 187 concurrency
Hampden	Agawam	40.4	65.0	Route 187 south – West Suffield, CT	Eastern end of Route 187 concurrency
Hampden	Agawam	40.4	65.0	Western end of freeway section	
Hampden	Agawam	41.8	67.3	Garden Street	Westbound exit and eastbound entrance
Hampden	Agawam	42.6	68.6	Mill Street west	Westbound exit and eastbound entrance
Hampden	Agawam	43.1	69.4	Route 75 – West Springfield, Suffield, CT	
Hampden	Agawam	43.9	70.7	Route 159 – Agawam Center, Windsor Locks, CT, West Springfield	Westbound exit and eastbound entrance
Hampden	Agawam	45.0	72.4	Editha Avenue	Westbound exit only
Hampden	Agawam	45.4	73.1	US 5 to I-91 – West Springfield, Holyoke, Springfield, Hartford, CT	Roundabout; eastern terminus
1.000 mi = 1.609 km; 1.000 km = 0.621 mi: Concurrency terminus; Incomplete access
