= Route 159 (Connecticut–Massachusetts) =

Highway in Connecticut and Massachusetts

Route 159
- Route 159 highlighted in red

Route information
- Maintained by CTDOT
- Length: 21.14 mi (34.02 km) Connecticut: 16.82 mi Massachusetts: 4.32 mi
- Existed: October 1968–present

Major junctions
- South end: North Main Street at the Hartford–Windsor, CT line
- I-91 in Windsor, CT; I-291 / Route 218 in Windsor, CT; I-91 in Windsor Locks, CT; Route 57 in Agawam, MA
- North end: Route 75 / Route 147 in Agawam, MA

Location
- Country: United States
- States: Connecticut, Massachusetts
- Counties: CT: Hartford, MA: Hampden

Highway system
- Connecticut State Highway System; Interstate; US; State; SSR; SR; Scenic
← Route 157	→ Route 160
← Route 152	MA	→ Route 168
← US 5	US 5A (CT)	→ US 6
← US 5	US 5A (MA)	→ US 6

Route 159 is a 21.14-mile-long (34.02 km) state highway connecting the Hartford and Springfield areas in the U.S. states of Connecticut and Massachusetts. It begins at the Hartford–Windsor town line and proceeds northward along the west bank of the Connecticut River towards Agawam, Massachusetts. The route ends at the junction of Route 147 and Route 75 in Agawam center just south of the West Springfield city line. The route was originally designated as U.S. Route 5A in 1932 and was renumbered to its modern designation in October 1968.

== Route description ==
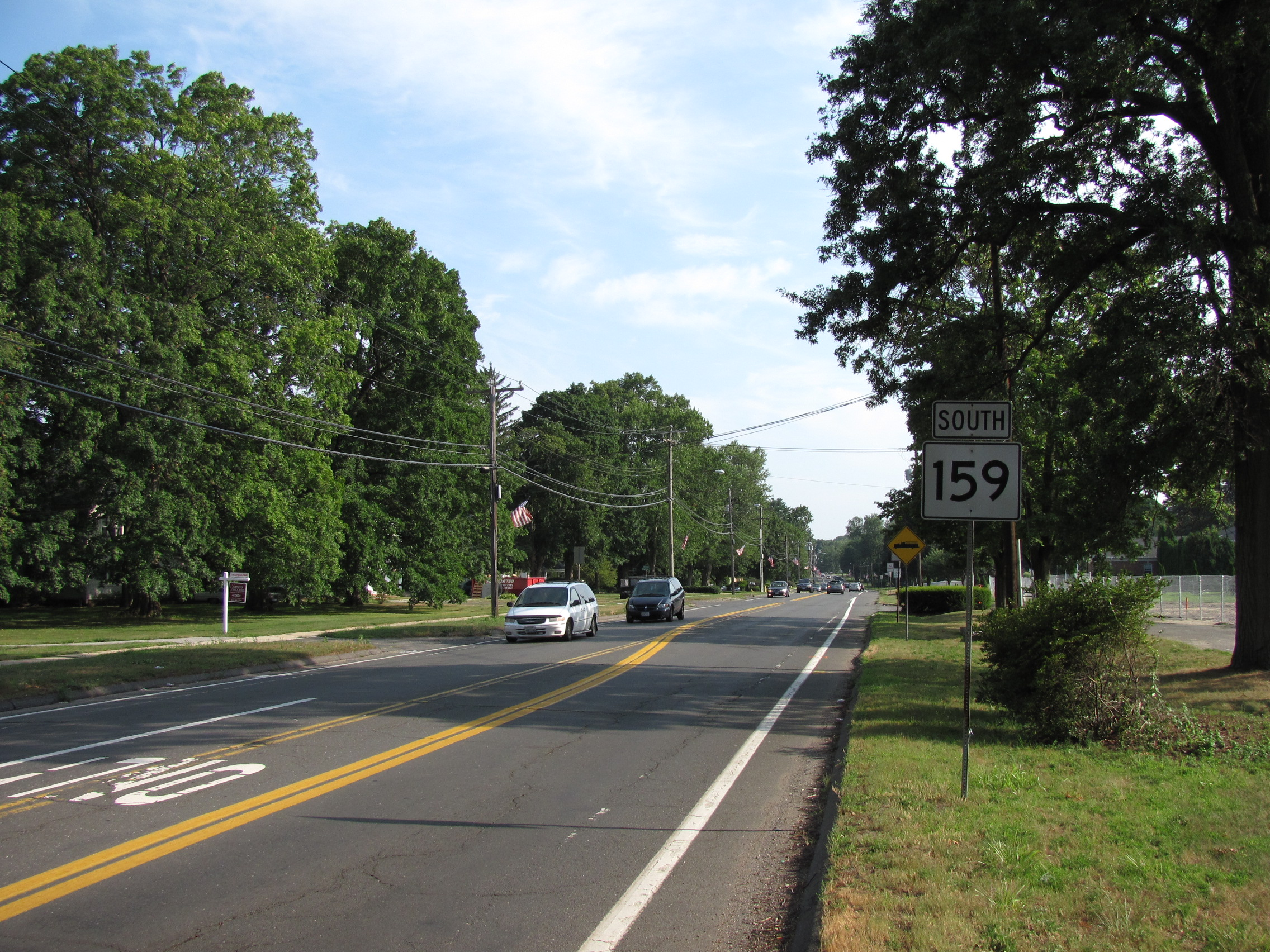
Southbound in Agawam, Massachusetts

Route 159 begins at the Hartford–Windsor town line as a continuation of North Main Street. It heads north as Windsor Avenue before meeting I-91 at Exit 41. In Windsor, it underpasses I-291, with access to and from the east provided by Deerfield Road. Almost immediately, it meets the eastern end of Route 218. After passing the east end of Route 178, Route 159 enters the center of Windsor, passing the town green before intersecting the southern end of Route 75. It then crosses the Farmington River, and starts to parallel the west bank of the Connecticut River, which it will for most of the rest of its length. In Windsor Locks, it meets I-91 once again at Exit 49, and has a brief overlap with Route 140. It passes along the eastern side of Suffield, where it has a brief overlap with Route 190. It then crosses the Massachusetts state line into Agawam, where it passes by Six Flags New England before entering the center of town. North of the center, Route 159 has an interchange with Route 57, before continuing north along Main Street to the intersection of Route 75 and Route 147 just south of the Westfield River and the West Springfield city line.

Route 159 in Windsor is also known as the Kasmir Pulaski Memorial Highway.

== History ==

Modern Route 159 roughly follows the path of the Upper Boston Post Road between Hartford and Springfield. In the 1920s, current Route 159 in Connecticut, with a few minor exceptions, was a primary state road designated as State Highway 110. Around 1930, the continuation in Massachusetts was numbered as State Route 5A, which ran along Main Street but continued north along River Road to the South End Bridge, where it crossed into Springfield to connect with US 5. In the 1932 state highway renumbering, the route in both Connecticut and Massachusetts was designated as US 5A. However, by 1938, Massachusetts redesignated its portion of the route as State Route 5A, truncating US 5A to the state line. The new State Route 5A was also relocated to follow Main Street into West Springfield, then continuing along River Street, Park Street, and Elm Street, where it ended at US 5. In October 1968, Connecticut decommissioned its US 5A and the road was redesignated in both states as Route 159. The portion in West Springfield, which was not state-maintained, became an unnumbered road.

== Major intersections ==
Mileposts reset at the state line.

State	County	Location	mi	km	Destinations	Notes
Connecticut	Hartford	Hartford–Windsor line	0.00	0.00	North Main Street – North Hartford	Continuation south
Connecticut	Hartford	Windsor	0.23	0.37	I-91 – Hartford, Springfield	Exit 41 on I-91
Connecticut	Hartford	Windsor	1.20– 1.24	1.93– 2.00	I-291 east / Route 218 west – South Windsor, Manchester, Bloomfield, West Hartford	Eastern terminus of Route 218; exit 1D on I-291
Connecticut	Hartford	Windsor	2.66	4.28	Route 178 west (Park Avenue) – Bloomfield	Eastern terminus of Route 178
Connecticut	Hartford	Windsor	3.76	6.05	Route 75 north / Route 305 west – Windsor Locks, Suffield, Bloomfield	Southern terminus of Route 75; eastern terminus of Route 305
Connecticut	Hartford	Windsor Locks	8.52	13.71	I-91 – Hartford, Springfield	Exit 49 on I-91
Connecticut	Hartford	Windsor Locks	9.12	14.68	Route 140 west (Elm Street) – Bradley International Airport	Southern end of Route 140 concurrency
Connecticut	Hartford	Windsor Locks	9.42	15.16	Route 140 east (Bridge Street) – East Windsor, Ellington	Northern end of Route 140 concurrency
Connecticut	Hartford	Suffield	13.82	22.24	Route 190 east (Hazard Avenue) – Enfield	Southern end of Route 190 concurrency
Connecticut	Hartford	Suffield	14.43	23.22	Route 190 west (Thompsonville Road) – Suffield Center	Northern end of Route 190 concurrency
Connecticut–Massachusetts state line			16.82 0.00	27.07 0.00	Route transition	
Massachusetts	Hampden	Agawam	3.08	4.96	Route 57 east – Springfield, Sturbridge	Interchange
Massachusetts	Hampden	Agawam	4.32	6.95	Route 75 south / Route 147 – Suffield, CT, West Springfield, Feeding Hills	Northern terminus; northern terminus of Route 75
1.000 mi = 1.609 km; 1.000 km = 0.621 mi: Concurrency terminus; Route transition
