= U.S. Route 5 in Massachusetts =

Segment of American highway

U.S. Route 5
- US 5 highlighted in red

Route information
- Maintained by MassDOT
- Length: 53.46 mi (86.04 km)

Major junctions
- South end: US 5 at the Connecticut state line in Longmeadow
- I-91 in Springfield and West Springfield; I-90 / Mass Pike / I-91 in West Springfield; Route 57 in Agawam; US 20 in West Springfield; US 202 in Holyoke; Route 9 / Route 10 in Northampton; Route 2 in Greenfield; Route 10 in Bernardston
- North end: US 5 at the Vermont state line in Bernardston

Location
- Country: United States
- State: Massachusetts
- Counties: Hampden, Hampshire, Franklin

Highway system
- United States Numbered Highway System; List; Special; Divided; Massachusetts State Highway System; Interstate; US; State
← Route 4	→ US 5A

U.S. Route 5 (US 5) is a north–south United States Numbered Highway extending from southern Connecticut to the northernmost part of Vermont. In Massachusetts, the route travels 53.46 miles (86.04 km), paralleling the Connecticut River and Interstate 91 (I-91) through Hampden, Hampshire, and Franklin counties.

== Route description ==
US 5 stays very close to the Connecticut River and I-91. It enters the state at the town of Longmeadow on the east bank of the river going up to Springfield. In Springfield, US 5 then overlaps with I-91 for about 0.5 miles (0.80 km) and then separates as its own freeway crossing the Connecticut River on the South End Bridge into Agawam. The freeway portion travels for about 3.3 miles (5.3 km) up to West Springfield. From the town of Northampton up to Bernardston, US 5 travels concurrent with Route 10 for 26 miles (42 km). US 5 also passes through Holyoke, Hatfield, Whately, Deerfield, and Greenfield. As in Connecticut and Vermont, US 5 has many interchanges with the parallel I-91.

== Major intersections ==
County	Location	mi	km	Destinations	Notes
Hampden	Longmeadow	0.00	0.00	US 5 south – Enfield, Hartford	Continuation into Connecticut
Hampden	Longmeadow	1.80	2.90	Route 192 south – East Longmeadow, Stafford Springs, CT	Northern terminus of Route 192
Hampden	Springfield	3.50	5.63	I-91 south – Hartford, CT	Southern end of I-91 concurrency; exit 1 on I-91
Hampden	Springfield	3.70	5.95	Route 83 south – Forest Park, East Longmeadow	Northern terminus of Route 83; exit 2 on I-91
Hampden	Springfield	3.90	6.28	I-91 north – Springfield, Chicopee, Holyoke	Northern end of I-91 concurrency; exit 3 on I-91
Hampden	Connecticut River			South End Bridge	
Hampden	Agawam	4.60	7.40	Route 57 west – Agawam, Southwick	Rotary interchange; Eastern terminus of Route 57
Hampden	West Springfield	5.80	9.33	Route 147 west – West Springfield, Agawam, Southwick	Rotary interchange; eastern terminus of Route 147; to Memorial Bridge
Hampden	West Springfield	7.00	11.27	US 20 – Westfield, Springfield	Rotary interchange
Hampden	West Springfield	9.30	14.97	I-91 to I-391 north – Holyoke, Springfield	Exits 10A-B on I-91
Hampden	West Springfield	10.80	17.38	I-90 / Mass Pike / I-91 – Holyoke, Springfield, Albany, NY, Boston	Exit 45 on I-90 / Mass Pike; exit 11 on I-91
Hampden	Holyoke	13.80	22.21	US 202 to I-91 – Westfield, Southwick, South Hadley	
Hampden	Holyoke	14.60	23.50	Route 141 east – Holyoke Center, Chicopee Falls	One-way eastbound
Hampden	Holyoke	14.80	23.82	Route 141 west to I-91 – Easthampton, Greenfield, Springfield	One-way westbound
Hampden	Holyoke	15.00	24.14	To US 202 north – South Hadley Falls, Athol	Access via Lincoln Street
Hampshire	Northampton	21.90	35.24	I-91 – Greenfield, Brattleboro, VT, Holyoke, Springfield	Exit 23 on I-91
Hampshire	Northampton	22.90	36.85	Route 9 / Route 10 south – Easthampton, Pittsfield, Amherst	Southern end of Route 10 concurrency
Hampshire	Northampton	24.30	39.11	I-91 north – Greenfield, Brattleboro, VT	Northbound exit and southbound entrance; exit 26 on I-91
Hampshire	Northampton	26.10	42.00	I-91 – Greenfield, Brattleboro, VT	Exit 27 on I-91
Hampshire	Hatfield	28.65	46.11	I-91 south – Holyoke, Springfield	Exit 30 on I-91
Franklin	Whately	30.50	49.08	I-91 north – Greenfield, Brattleboro, VT	
Franklin	Whately	33.70	54.23	I-91 south – Holyoke, Springfield	Exit 35 on I-91
Franklin	Whately	33.90	54.56	Route 116 south – Sunderland, Amherst	Southern end of Route 116 concurrency
Franklin	Deerfield	34.80	56.01	Route 116 north to I-91 north – Conway, Ashfield	Northern end of Route 116 concurrency
Franklin	Deerfield River			Bridge	
Franklin	Greenfield	42.50	68.40	Route 2A – Athol, Shelburne	Court Square; site of historic road marker
Franklin	Greenfield	44.20	71.13	Route 2 to I-91 – Athol, Boston, North Adams, Bernardston, Springfield	Diamond interchange
Franklin	Bernardston	49.00	78.86	Route 10 north to I-91 – Northfield, Erving, Keene, NH	Northern end of Route 10 concurrency
Franklin	Bernardston	53.46	86.04	US 5 north – Brattleboro	Continuation into Vermont
1.000 mi = 1.609 km; 1.000 km = 0.621 mi: Concurrency terminus; Incomplete access

== See also ==
U.S. Route 5
Previous state: Connecticut	Massachusetts	Next state: Vermont
