= Erwin Markham =

19th century American automobile investor (1811–1891)

Erwin Markham (1838–1914) was an investor in the early years of the American automobile industry. Between March 1892 and February 1894, Markham invested a total of $2800 in Charles and Frank Duryea's project of creating a self-propelled road vehicle.

== Personal life ==
Markham was born December 18, 1838, in Longmeadow, Massachusetts. The son of Solvin and Harriet Markham, he married Henrietta E. King on November 29, 1860. The 1872 Springfield Massachusetts Directory, lists Markham as a butcher, but by 1887 he had switched to nursing. When Charles Duryea asked him to support their efforts in an untried field, Markham risked his life savings to fund the project.

In March 1892 Markham supplied the brothers with $1000. After Charles had finished his work, he moved back to Illinois. Frank ultimately scrapped his brother's design and approached Markham for another $1000. Markham agreed and continued to fund the project. When asking Markham for the third time, he refused: "The thing's no good, Frank, and I have lost my money. No. All my savings will go. I'll have to quit now." Frank offered to forgo his pay, and Markham agreed to another $800.

When Frank produced a practical vehicle in 1894, Markham declined to invest in production. He was bought out for $5000, an 80% return on his $2800 investment.

In the 1900 census Markham was listed as a stock broker. In the 1909 Springfield directory he was listed as treasurer of the US Automatic Lighting Company. He died in 1914.
