= Dexter Coffin Bridge =

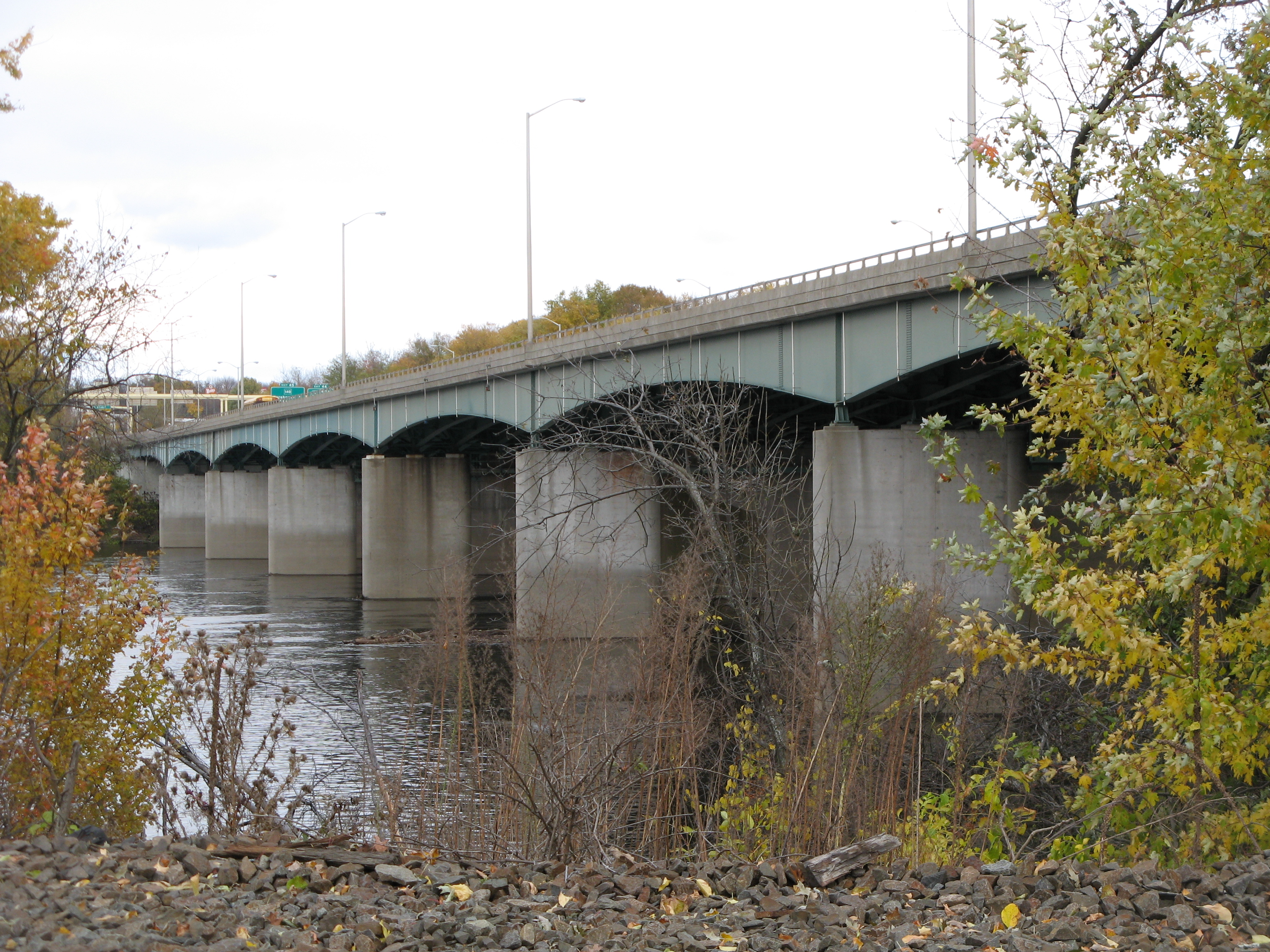
- The upstream side of the Dexter Coffin Bridge pictured from Windsor Locks looking towards East Windsor.
- Coordinates: 41°55′00″N 72°37′22″W
- Carries: 8 lanes of I-91
- Crosses: Connecticut River
- Locale: Windsor Locks, Connecticut and East Windsor, Connecticut

History
- Construction start: 1957
- Construction end: July 11, 1959

The Dexter Coffin Bridge is a crossing for Interstate 91 over the Connecticut River north of Hartford, Connecticut, connecting the towns of Windsor Locks, Connecticut and East Windsor, Connecticut. It can be seen from the Windsor Locks Amtrak station.

== History ==
In 1952, plans were made to cross the Connecticut River at Windsor Locks for I-91, so the highway would not cross Windsor Locks's tobacco fields at the river. Plans were started in 1954 for the bridge, which would replace an outdated bridge near the same location. The bridge's construction was started in 1957 and was completed and dedicated on July 11, 1959.

== See also ==
- List of crossings of the Connecticut River
