= Interstate 91 =

Interstate Highway in the U.S. states of Connecticut, Massachusetts, and Vermont

Interstate 91
- I-91 highlighted in red

Route information
- Length: 290.37 mi (467.31 km)
- Existed: August 14, 1957–present
- NHS: Entire route

Major junctions
- South end: I-95 in New Haven, Connecticut
- Route 15 / Wilbur Cross Parkway in Meriden, Connecticut; I-691 / Route 66 in Meriden, Connecticut; Route 9 in Cromwell, Connecticut; I-84 / US 6 / US 44 in Hartford, Connecticut; I-291 / I-90 / US 20 / Route 20A in Springfield, Massachusetts; I-391 in Chicopee, Massachusetts; Route 9 in Northampton, Massachusetts; Route 2 in Greenfield, Massachusetts; I-89 in White River Junction, Vermont; I-93 in St. Johnsbury, Vermont
- North end: A-55 at the Canadian border in Derby Line, Vermont

Location
- Country: United States
- States: Connecticut, Massachusetts, Vermont
- Counties: Connecticut: New Haven, Middlesex, Hartford; Massachusetts: Hampden, Hampshire, Franklin; Vermont: Windham, Windsor, Orange, Caledonia, Orleans

Highway system
- Interstate Highway System; Main; Auxiliary; Suffixed; Business; Future
- Connecticut State Highway System; Interstate; US; State; SSR; SR; Scenic
- Massachusetts State Highway System; Interstate; US; State
- State highways in Vermont
← Route 89	Connecticut	→ Route 94
← I-90	Massachusetts	→ I-93
← I-89	Vermont	→ I-93

Interstate 91 (I-91) is an Interstate Highway in the New England region of the United States. It is the primary north–south thoroughfare in the western part of the region. Its southern terminus is in New Haven, Connecticut, at I-95, while its northern terminus is in Derby Line, Vermont, at the Canada–United States border. Past the Derby Line–Rock Island Border Crossing, the road continues into Canada as Quebec Autoroute 55 (A-55). I-91 is the longest of three Interstate highways whose entire route is located within the New England states (the other two highways being I-89 and I-93) and is also the only primary (two-digit) Interstate Highway in New England to intersect all five of the other interstate highways that run through the region. The largest cities along its route, from south to north, are New Haven, Connecticut; Hartford, Connecticut; Springfield, Massachusetts; Northampton, Massachusetts; Greenfield, Massachusetts; Brattleboro, Vermont; White River Junction, Vermont; St. Johnsbury, Vermont; and Newport, Vermont.

== Route description ==
Lengths
	mi	km
CT	58.00	93.34
MA	54.99	88.50
VT	177.38	285.47
Total	290.33	467.24

I-91 is 290 miles (470 km) long and travels north and south: 58 miles (93 km) in Connecticut, 55 miles (89 km) in Massachusetts, and 177 miles (285 km) in Vermont. I-91 parallels US Route 5 (US 5) for all of its length, and many of the exits along I-91 provide direct or indirect access to the older route. Much of the route of I-91 follows the Connecticut River, traveling from Hartford, Connecticut, northward to St. Johnsbury, Vermont.

=== Connecticut ===
I-91 is the major north–south transportation corridor for the center of the state. It is the main route between the larger cities of New Haven, Hartford, and Springfield, Massachusetts. As such, it is almost always heavily trafficked (especially during rush hour) and maintains at least three lanes in each direction through Connecticut except for a short portion in Hartford at the interchange with I-84, and another in Meriden at the interchange with Route 15. The three cities also serve as Connecticut's control points along its length of the Interstate.

I-91 begins just east of Downtown New Haven at an interchange with I-95 (Connecticut Turnpike). At the bottom of the ramp for exit 5, US 5 begins at the first of its many interchanges with the freeway. Leaving New Haven, I-91 follows a northeastward trek into North Haven, where it meets the southern end of the Route 40 expressway. It travels through the eastern part of Wallingford before entering the eastern part of the city of Meriden. In Meriden, about halfway between Hartford and New Haven, I-91 sees a complex set of interchanges with the Wilbur Cross Parkway (Route 15), the Route 66 expressway, and its first spur route, I-691. I-691 provides a westward link to I-84 and the city of Waterbury. Leaving Meriden, I-91 enters Middlesex County as it briefly travels through the western part of Middletown before entering Cromwell, where it has an interchange with the Route 9 expressway.

It then enters Hartford County in the town of Rocky Hill and then enters Wethersfield, meeting the Route 3 expressway, which leads to Glastonbury and the Route 2 expressway via the William H. Putnam Memorial Bridge over the Connecticut River. From there to St. Johnsbury, Vermont, I-91 parallels the river, never more than five miles (8.0 km) from its west bank. I-91 then enters the Hartford city limits; in that city, it has a set of interchanges with US 5/Route 15 (Wilbur Cross Highway), which provides access from I-91 north to I-84 east, and from I-84 west to I-91 south via the Charter Oak Bridge. I-91 then has an interchange with I-84, where all other transitions to and from I-84 take place. Before leaving the city limits, a high-occupancy vehicle lane begins that has its own set of interchanges up to exit 38.

I-91 then enters Windsor and meets the western end of its other Connecticut spur route, I-291. At the Windsor–Windsor Locks town line, it meets the eastern terminus of the Route 20 expressway, which provides direct access to Bradley International Airport. A couple of miles further north, I-91 crosses the Connecticut River on the Dexter Coffin Bridge into East Windsor. After traveling through East Windsor and Enfield, it crosses the state line, at milepost 58, into Longmeadow, Massachusetts.

=== Massachusetts ===
I-91 extends 55 miles (89 km) through the Pioneer Valley of western Massachusetts paralleling the Connecticut River. I-91 serves as the major transportation corridor through three Massachusetts counties, linking the cities of Springfield, Northampton, and Greenfield. These three cities serve as the control cities listed on guide and mileage signs, along with Brattleboro, Vermont, beginning with the first northbound conventional mileage sign (63 miles [101 km]) in Longmeadow.

In Springfield, I-91 has an interchange with I-291 at exit 6 (old exit 8), a 5.44-mile-long (8.75 km) spur going eastbound to connect with the Massachusetts Turnpike, for travelers going either east toward Boston or west toward Albany, New York. North of Springfield, I-91 briefly enters Chicopee, there is an interchange with its spur, I-391, at exit 9 (old exit 12) before turning westward to cross the Connecticut River into West Springfield. I-391 provides direct access to Holyoke, while I-91 continues on the western side of the river.

Just after the river crossing, exit 11 (old exit 14) is a major interchange with the Massachusetts Turnpike (I-90). Then, I-91 enters the city of Holyoke where exit 12 (old exit 15) is located. Just after an interchange with US 202, (exit 16) I-91 goes from three lanes to two lanes in each direction to the Vermont state line. After a short exit-less stretch, I-91 enters Northampton, passing the Northampton Airport and an oxbow lake. The towns of Hadley and Amherst, home to the main campus of the University of Massachusetts Amherst, are accessible from I-91 exits in Northampton via Route 9.

Continuing north, I-91 enters Hatfield, where it begins a straight section—nearly six miles (9.7 km) without a bend in the road. Several exits provide access to US 5 and Route 10 in Hatfield and Whately before entering Deerfield. I-91 has two exits in Greenfield. At exit 43 (old exit 26), the southern end of its overlap with Route 2, there is a rest area and visitor information center for Franklin County. At exit 46 (old exit 27), also in Greenfield, is the northern end of its overlap with Route 2 where access to that road is provided via a directional T interchange and exit and entry ramps on the left side of southbound I-91. Exit 50 (old exit 28) in Bernardston is the last exit in Massachusetts. Beyond exit 50, I-91 continues for about five miles (8.0 km) more before crossing into Vermont.

Massachusetts is the only state traversed by I-91 where another numbered highway is concurrent with the Interstate (in this case, US 5, for a 0.5-mile (0.80 km) spur near the Springfield–Longmeadow town line and Route 2, for approximately three miles (4.8 km) in Greenfield).

=== Vermont ===
I-91 traverses the entire length of Vermont and serves as a major transportation corridor for eastern Vermont and western New Hampshire. Due to its routing along the Connecticut River separating the two states, many exits along Vermont's length of I-91 feature New Hampshire towns on the guide signs (for example, exit 3, which lists Brattleboro and Keene, New Hampshire, as the points of access). The length of I-91 within Vermont is 177 miles (285 km) and has two lanes in each direction the entire way from the Massachusetts state line to the Canada–United States border (nearly two-thirds of I-91's length) with 29 Vermont interchanges. The highway's rural character and long distances between exits in Vermont are in stark contrast to its south, where exits are more frequent and the road carries four lanes of traffic in each direction at some points. The major control cities in Vermont are Brattleboro, White River Junction, St. Johnsbury, and Newport. When entering northbound I-91 at exit 28 in Derby, the control city sign is for Canada. Of these destinations, only Newport is a city, although the other towns are sizable. In general, the road parallels its predecessor, US 5.

I-91 enters Vermont in the town of Guilford. Just before exit 1 in Brattleboro is the Vermont Welcome Center in Guilford. The first three Vermont exits (northbound) serve the town of Brattleboro. At exit 1, northbound US 5 provides access to stores and a small industrial area before reaching the south end of the town's center, where a bridge crosses the Connecticut River into Hinsdale, New Hampshire, via New Hampshire Route 119 (NH 119). Exit 2 (Vermont Route 9 [VT 9]) provides access to the western village of the town (West Brattleboro), then continues west to Marlboro, Wilmington, and Bennington. Brattleboro's main retail strip is located at and just south of the exit 3 trumpet interchange and traffic circle. Following VT 9 eastward, one can reach Keene, New Hampshire, in 15 miles (24 km).

After exit 3, I-91 heads north to travel through the communities of Dummerston, Putney, Westminster, North Westminster, Bellows Falls, Springfield, Weathersfield, Windsor, Hartland, North Hartland and White River Junction. White River Junction, listed as a control city on mileage signs as far south as Greenfield, Massachusetts, is where I-91 and I-89 meet and provide access to many points in Vermont and New Hampshire, at exit 10.

North of the interchange with I-89, I-91 continues toward St. Johnsbury and travels through Wilder and Norwich. It enters Orange County, passing through Thetford, Fairlee, Bradford, Newbury, and Wells River. It continues into the Caledonia County communities of Ryegate, Barnet and Waterford, before coming to its next major intersection in St. Johnsbury at the northern terminus of I-93, providing access to the White Mountains of New Hampshire and the Greater Boston area. Along this stretch of highway between White River Junction and St. Johnsbury, towns in Grafton County, New Hampshire, on the other side of the river can also be easily accessed. Just after exit 19, there are three exits for St. Johnsbury, including a major intersection with US 2. Along westbound US 2, the capital of Vermont, Montpelier, is eventually reached from I-91, although I-89 provides Montpelier with immediate Interstate access.

I-91 continues northward, now following the Passumpsic River valley. It travels through Vermont's Northeast Kingdom region and the town of Lyndon. Two exits in Lyndon serve the village of Lyndonville and Lyndon State College. After exit 24, I-91 departs US 5, which it had been closely paralleling since the Massachusetts state line. I-91 follows the valley of Miller Run, (Note: Miller Run feeds southeast into the Passumpsic River.) and there are no convenient services until Barton at exit 25.

The Interstate proceeds through Sheffield. Here, it reaches the highest point on the highway, just north of milemarker 150 on Sheffield Heights, elevation 1,856 feet (566 m).

After leaving Sheffield Heights, it enters Orleans County and follows the Barton River valley north with exits in Barton, Orleans, and Derby. Exit 29 is the final US exit on I-91 just after milemarker 177 at Derby Line. Beyond this exit, northbound motorists enter Canada Customs at Stanstead, Quebec, and continue into Canada on Quebec Autoroute 55 through the Eastern Townships.

As with Connecticut and Massachusetts, US 5 closely parallels I-91 for their entire lengths in Vermont. While paralleling I-91 in Vermont, US 5 is never concurrent with the freeway but remains its own two-lane highway, except for a portion in White River Junction where it is a four-lane, divided, surface arterial freeway.

Traffic and the population of each successive town tend to diminish as the road proceeds northward. The average daily traffic count for 2015 in Vermont were—St. Johnsbury (34,000), Lyndon (17,900), Barton (13,500), and Derby (Canada–United States border) (10,300).

Interstate 91

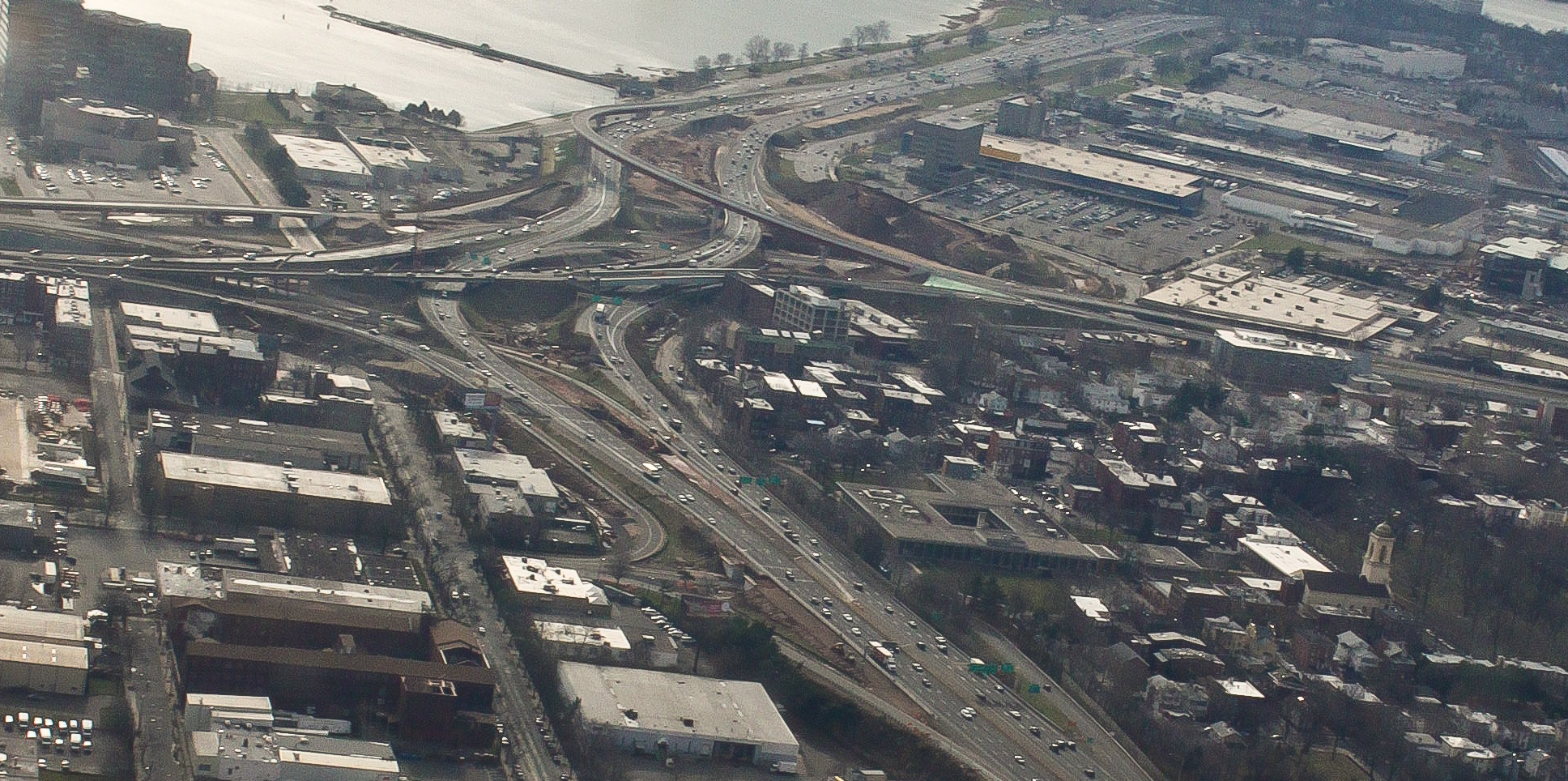
The beginning of I-91 in New Haven, Connecticut (Before 2016 interchange reconfiguration)

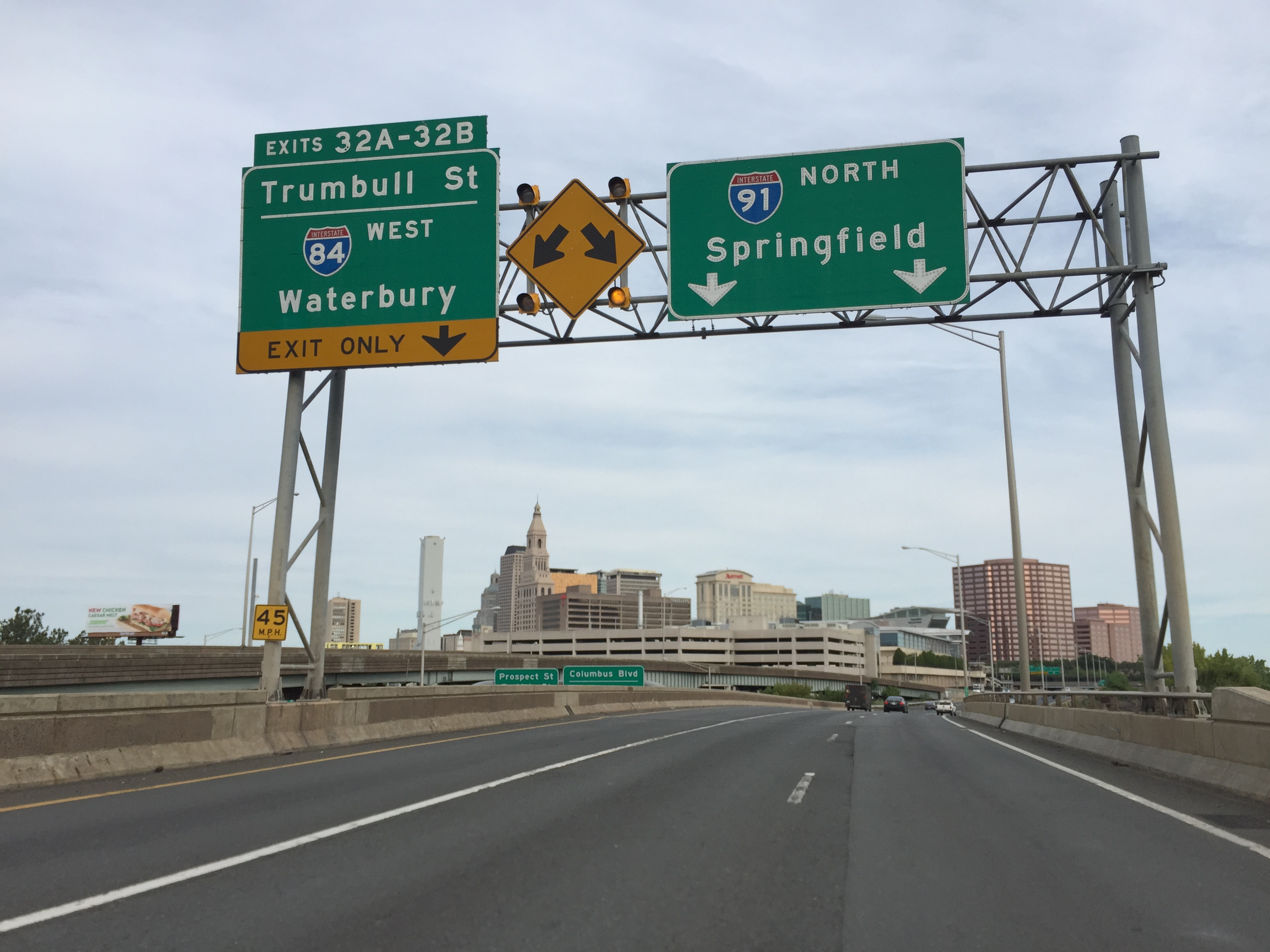
I-91 north at exit 32 (I-84 west) in Hartford, Connecticut

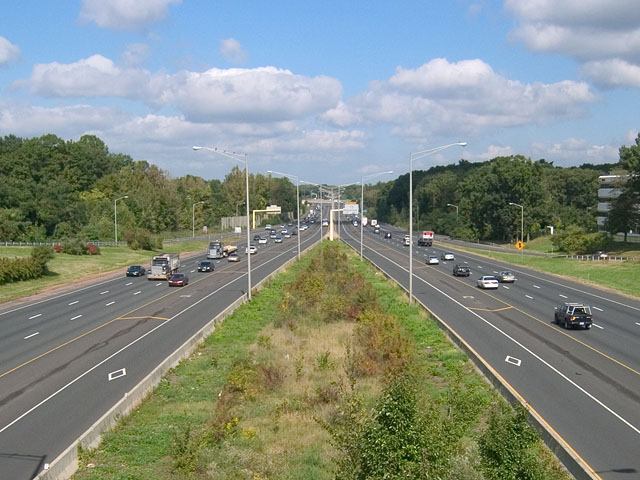
I-91 has an HOV lane between Hartford and Windsor, Connecticut.

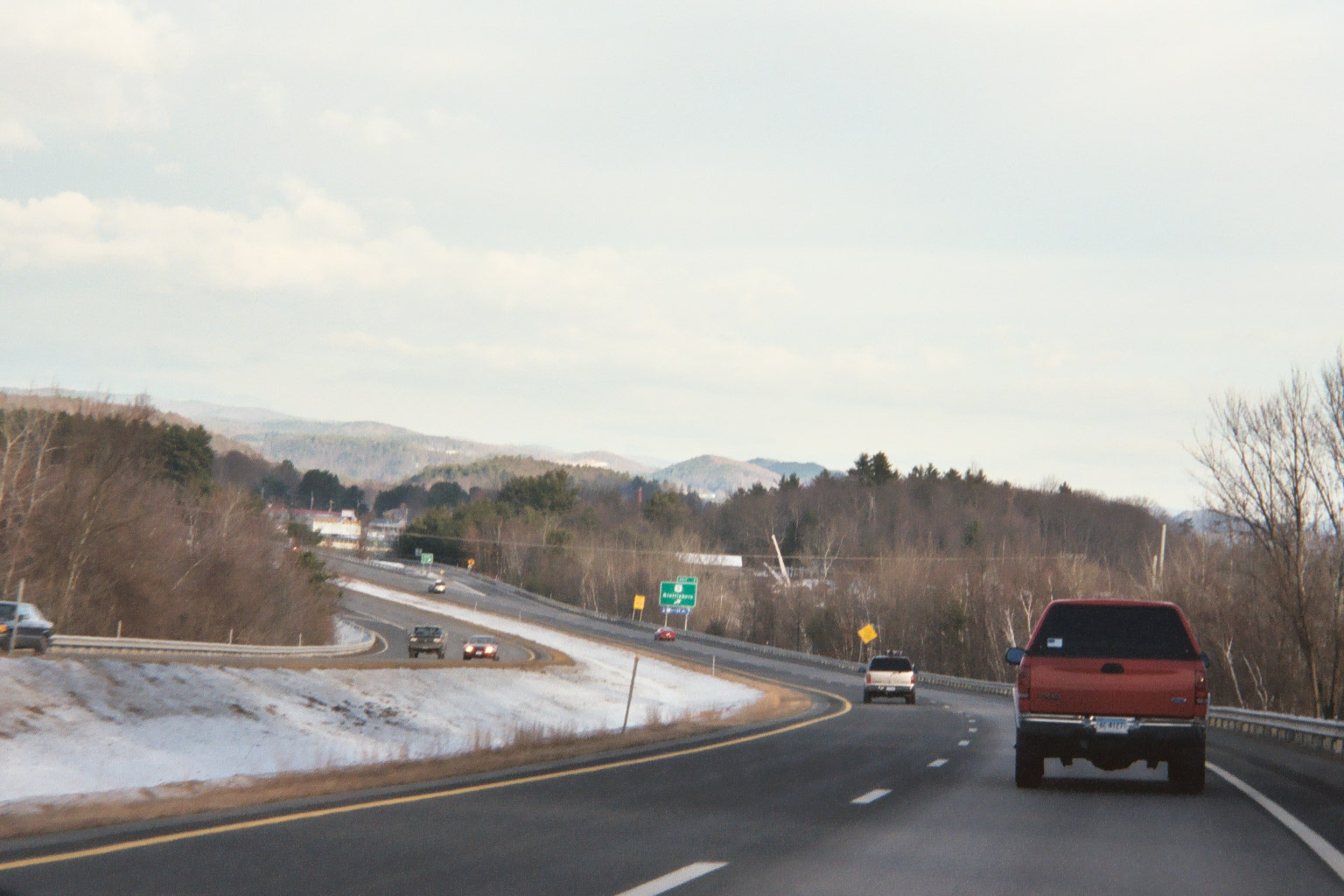
I-91 looking northbound in Brattleboro, Vermont

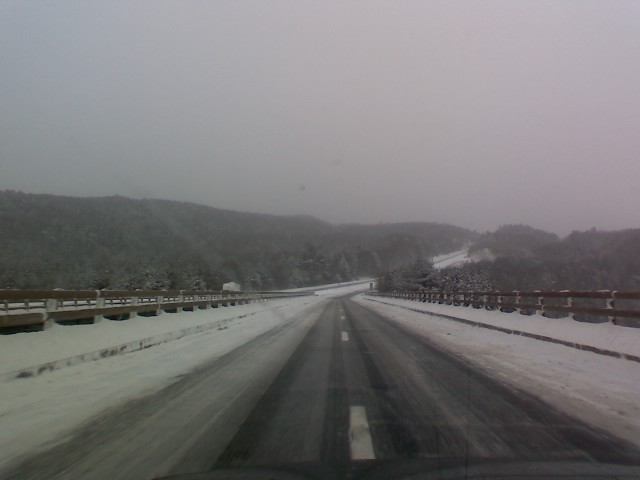
Northbound I-91 just north of exit 6 in Rockingham, Vermont

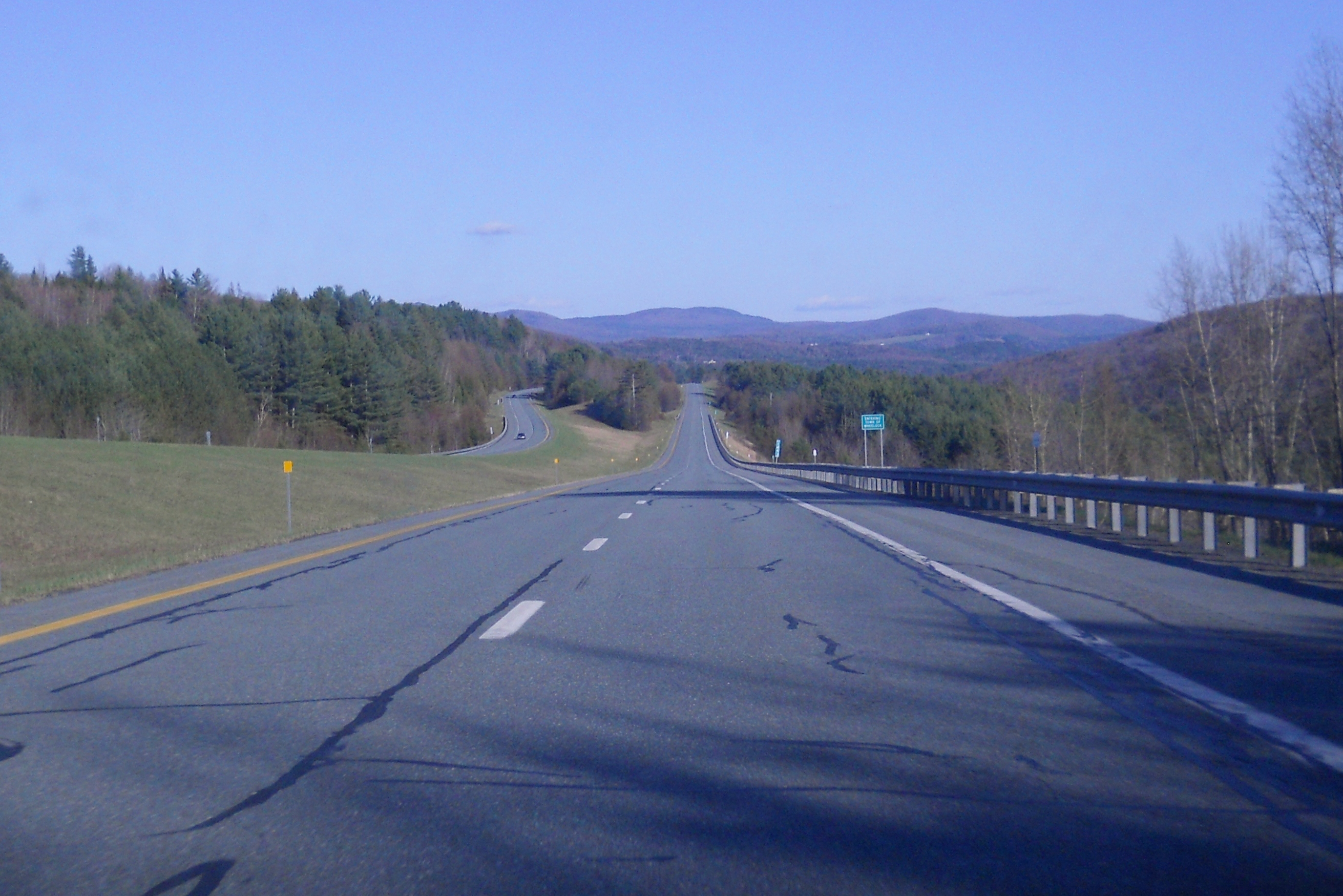
Southbound I-91 in Wheelock, Vermont

== History ==
A limited-access highway replacement for US 5 was planned at the federal level starting in 1944. A 1953 Massachusetts plan was funded by the Federal-Aid Highway Act of 1956, along with spur I-291 (but not I-391). The Vermont section of I-91 was built in stages from 1958 to 1965. In Massachusetts from Bernardston to Northampton, I-91 follows an abandoned right-of-way of the New York, New Haven and Hartford Railroad. To support plans for urban renewal along the "low value" waterfront, the highway crossed the Connecticut River to parallel active New York, New Haven and Hartford Railroad tracks on the Springfield side of the river, bypassing West Springfield and Agawam, Massachusetts. Later, this path was perceived as cutting off the city from the river, restricting further commercial development. By 1960, a few miles in Massachusetts were completed, starting from the Connecticut and Vermont state lines. Massachusetts construction was completed from 1960s to 1970.

In the 1950s–1970s, there were plans to extend I-91 to Wading River, New York, from its existing terminus in New Haven, Connecticut, via a crossing of the Long Island Sound (see "Unbuilt Long Island extension" below). Vermont completed its last sections of I-91 in 1978.

Starting in the 1990s, several rest areas were downgraded in Vermont, increasing distances between facilities. In 2008, Vermont closed the Springfield–Rockingham rest areas because of suspected use by drug abusers. In 2009, the northbound rest area in Hartford was closed, creating a 90-mile (140 km) gap in on-highway facilities. At the present time, there exist two intermediate rest areas with facilities in each direction, in addition to a welcome center at each end of the state. Several parking areas remain open.

In the early 1990s after the I-284 project was canceled, the exit 44 interchange in East Windsor, Connecticut, was altered as it was designed to be part of the freeway. After alterations, exit 44 connected to US 5 for all traffic to get on and off. As a result, exit 43 was shut down and closed in that same time frame. Exit 43 was a northbound exit/southbound entrance on Route 510/Main Street in East Windsor, which was about 1,050 feet (320 m) away from exit 44.

After the September 11 attacks, a seldom-staffed temporary border patrol checkpoint was installed near White River Junction, Vermont, about 100 miles (160 km) from the Canada–United States border.

In 2005, the Massachusetts Highway Department completed a rebuild of on- and offramps in Springfield to reduce accidents caused by weaving near the tightly spaced exits.

=== Impact in Springfield, MA ===
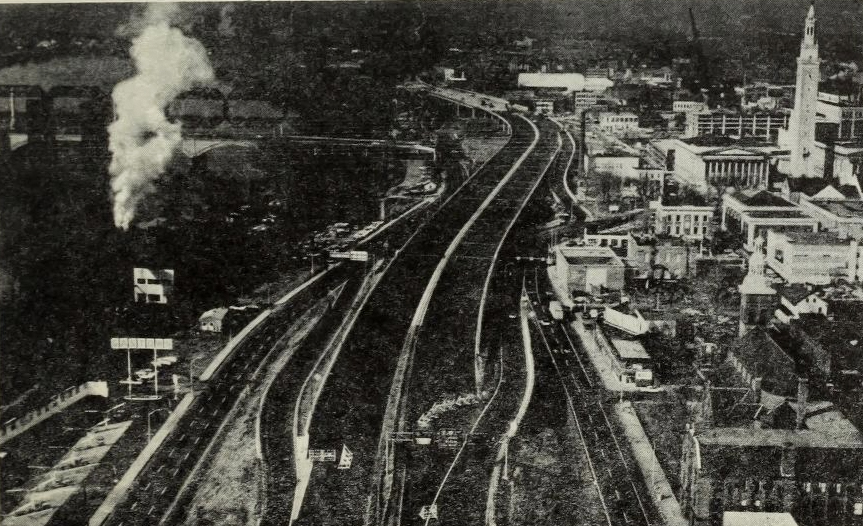
I-91 in 1969, just after completion of the viaduct that would separate Springfield from the Connecticut River. St. Joseph's Church and the Campanile can be seen in the foreground, as well as an incomplete Tower Square.

During its construction in the 1960s, I-91 sliced through three Springfield neighborhoods: the North End, Metro Center, and South End, which led to urban decay in the highway's vicinity. Springfield's portion of the Interstate was widely regarded as positive progress when it was built. However, by the 2010s, it would come to be perceived as disrupting the urban fabric of riverfront neighborhoods while effectively disconnecting the Connecticut River, the Connecticut River Walk Park and the Naismith Memorial Basketball Hall of Fame from everything east of the highway—the majority of the city. I-91 was erected without tunnels, footbridges or other paths, a design choice which poses logistical problems for travel between the riverfront and the remainder of the city. This, in turn, poses problems for businesses that would like to set up along the riverfront. The placement of I-91 has left Springfield's riverfront virtually undeveloped, aside from the sliver of land surrounding the Basketball Hall of Fame.

In 2010, the Urban Land Institute made recommendations for how Springfield might reconnect with its riverfront, in order to revitalize the area through urban renewal, suggesting the most cost-effective but also the most development-limiting strategy (constructing pathways beneath I-91). No decision has been reached regarding those recommendations. As of 2011, academic and civic studies are still underway. Preliminary findings indicate that I-91's placement negatively impacts tourism in Springfield's Metro Center—the site of many of Springfield's historic, cultural, and entertainment venues. Springfield's most popular tourist attraction, the riverfront Basketball Hall of Fame, is separated from Metro Center by a 20-foot (6.1 m) stone wall, buttressing an elevated portion of the six-lane I-91 and greatly discouraging travel between the two areas. Academic suggestions that involve the demolition of the current highway and moving it to a less obtrusive site in the city have been proposed, including the demolition of the highway and following the original path suggested, Riverdale Road, and, least obtrusive but still requiring a great deal of work, a plan to construct numerous walkways beneath the elevated highway to better integrate the neighborhoods with the waterfront despite the highway's presence.

=== Unbuilt Long Island extension ===
A map showing the built segment of I-91 (black) and the unbuilt southern extension to Long Island (red); the never-built extension would have traversed the unbuilt New Haven–Shoreham Bridge and an upgraded William Floyd Parkway.

Between the 1950s and 1970s, officials proposed extending I-91 across the Long Island Sound from its current terminus at the I-91/I-95 interchange in New Haven, Connecticut, to Wading River, New York, by means of a bridge over the Long Island Sound, as one of the many Long Island Sound Link proposals. The extension would have continued southward from Wading River to the southern shore of Long Island by the existing County Route 46 (William Floyd Parkway) in central Suffolk County—which would have been updated to Interstate Highway standards. It would also provide easier access to New York City via the Long Island Expressway (I-495), as well as to the Hamptons via New York State Route 27 (Sunrise Highway). The various proposals for this never-built extension were ultimately dropped after a 1979 study of the concept. Following this, officials proposed to connect the New Haven and Shoreham–Wading River areas by means of ferry service across the Long Island Sound—however, the plans to implement these cross-sound ferry services were ultimately mothballed as well.

Despite the cancelation of the bridge, many Long Islanders are still in favor of building one. In 2000, a survey was conducted by News 12 Networks and Newsday, which found that the majority (63 percent) of Long Islanders were in support of such a project.

In 2016, the proposal was again renewed by New York Governor Andrew Cuomo, as either a bridge or a tunnel. However, these plans were also dropped, as announced by the New York State Department of Transportation in 2018.

== Exit list ==
All interchanges in Massachusetts were to be renumbered to milepost-based numbers under a project scheduled to start in 2016. However, this project was indefinitely postponed until November 18, 2019, when the Massachusetts Department of Transportation (MassDOT) confirmed that, beginning in the middle of 2020, the exit renumbering project would begin. On March 1, 2021, MassDOT confirmed that the exit renumbering on I-91 would start on March 3, and it would last for two weeks. In 2020, Vermont added "milepoint exit" numbers to existing signs, essentially marking each interchange with two exit numbers. Connecticut will not implement the new exit numbers on I-91 until approximately 2027.

State	County	Location	mi	km	Old exit	New exit	Destinations	Notes
Connecticut	New Haven	New Haven	0.00	0.00	—	1A	I-95 south – New York City	Southern terminus and Northbound exit and southbound entrance; exit 47B on I-95 north
Connecticut	New Haven	New Haven	0.09	0.14	1	1B	Oak Street Connector (SR 724 west) – Downtown New Haven	Southbound exit and northbound entrance; signed as MLK Boulevard; former Route 34
Connecticut	New Haven	New Haven			—	1C	I-95 north – New London	Southbound exit and northbound entrance; exit 47B on I-95 south
Connecticut	New Haven	New Haven	0.63	1.01	2	1D	Hamilton Street	Southbound exit and northbound entrance
Connecticut	New Haven	New Haven	0.99– 1.02	1.59– 1.64	3	1E	Trumbull Street	Signed as exit 1 northbound
Connecticut	New Haven	New Haven	1.30	2.09	4 (SB); 5 (NB)	2A	US 5 (State Street) – Fair Haven	US 5 not signed southbound; southern terminus of US 5
Connecticut	New Haven	New Haven	1.44– 2.15	2.32– 3.46	6	2B	US 5 / Willow Street / Blatchley Avenue	US 5 not signed northbound
Connecticut	New Haven	New Haven	1.44– 2.15	2.32– 3.46	7	2C	Ferry Street – Fair Haven	Southbound exit and northbound entrance
Connecticut	New Haven	New Haven	2.78	4.47	8	3	Route 17 (Middletown Avenue) / Route 80 – North Branford	Southern terminus of Route 17; western terminus of Route 80
Connecticut	New Haven	North Haven	4.81	7.74	9	4	Montowese Avenue	
Connecticut	New Haven	North Haven	6.63	10.67	10	6	Route 40 – Mount Carmel, Hamden	Also serves Quinnipiac University; southern terminus and exits 1A and 1C on Route 40
Connecticut	New Haven	North Haven	7.72	12.42	11	7	Route 22 – North Haven	Northbound exit and southbound entrance
Connecticut	New Haven	North Haven	8.58	13.81	12	8	US 5 (Washington Avenue)	
Connecticut	New Haven	Wallingford	10.94	17.61	13	11	US 5 – Wallingford, North Haven	Access via SR 702; Signed for Wallingford northbound, North Haven southbound
Connecticut	New Haven	Wallingford	12.30	19.79	14	12	Route 150 (Woodhouse Avenue)	Northbound exit and southbound entrance
Connecticut	New Haven	Wallingford	13.25	21.32	14	12	Route 150 – Wallingford	Southbound exit and northbound entrance
Connecticut	New Haven	Wallingford	16.01	25.77	15	16	Route 68 – Yalesville, Durham	
Connecticut	New Haven	Meriden	19.22	30.93	16	18	Route 15 north (Wilbur Cross Parkway) to I-691 west / East Main Street	Northbound exit and southbound entrance; Wilbur Cross Parkway north signed as Berlin Turnpike
Connecticut	New Haven	Meriden	19.74	31.77	17	19	Route 15 south (Wilbur Cross Parkway) / East Main Street	Southbound exit and northbound entrance; exit 65A on Wilbur Cross Parkway north
Connecticut	New Haven	Meriden	20.11	32.36	18	20	Route 66 east – Middlefield, Middletown	No southbound exit; western terminus of Route 66
Connecticut	New Haven	Meriden	20.11	32.36	18	20	I-691 west to Route 15 north (Berlin Turnpike) – Meriden, Waterbury	Southbound exit and northbound entrance; eastern terminus and exit 1A on I-691 east
Connecticut	New Haven	Meriden	21.14	34.02	19	21	Baldwin Avenue / Preston Avenue	Southbound exit and northbound entrance
Connecticut	Middlesex	Middletown	23.16	37.27	20	23	Country Club Road / Middle Street	
Connecticut	Middlesex	Cromwell	25.74	41.42	21	26	Route 372 – Cromwell, Berlin	
Connecticut	Middlesex	Cromwell	27.28– 27.43	43.90– 44.14	22N-S	27-28	Route 9 – New Britain, Middletown, Old Saybrook	Old Saybrook not signed northbound; signed currently as exits 22N (Route 9 north) and 22S (Route 9 south) southbound; exits 29 and 30 on Route 9
Connecticut	Hartford	Rocky Hill	29.39	47.30	23	29	To Route 3 – Rocky Hill	Access via SSR 411
Connecticut	Hartford	Rocky Hill	31.67	50.97	24	31	Route 99 – Wethersfield, Rocky Hill	Former Route 9
Connecticut	Hartford	Wethersfield	33.67– 34.13	54.19– 54.93	25	33-34A	Route 3 – Glastonbury, Wethersfield	Signed currently as exit 25; no northbound access to Route 3 south; exits 11A and 11B on Route 3
Connecticut	Hartford	Wethersfield	33.67– 34.13	54.19– 54.93	26	34B	Old Wethersfield	Access via Marsh Street
Connecticut	Hartford	Hartford	35.54– 36.55	57.20– 58.82	27	36A	Brainard Road / Airport Road (SR 530 west)	Northbound exit and southbound entrance
Connecticut	Hartford	Hartford	35.54– 36.55	57.20– 58.82	28-29	36B-C	US 5 / Route 15 to I-84 east (US 6 east / US 44 east) / Berlin Turnpike – Wethersfield, Newington, East Hartford, Boston	Signed currently as exits 28 (Route 15 south) and 29 (Route 15 north); no southbound access to Route 15 north; US 5 / Route 15 Berlin Turnpike not signed northbound
Connecticut	Hartford	Hartford	37.55	60.43	29A	37	Capitol Area	Access via SR 598; former proposed I-484; northbound left exit
Connecticut	Hartford	Hartford	38.18– 38.47	61.44– 61.91	32	39	I-84 west (US 6 west) / Trumbull Street – Waterbury	Signed as exits 62B and 62C on I-84
Connecticut	Hartford	Hartford	38.18– 38.47	61.44– 61.91	30	38A	I-84 east (US 6 east / US 44 east) to Route 2 east – East Hartford, New London	Southbound exit and northbound entrance; exit 62B on I-84
Connecticut	Hartford	Hartford	38.18– 38.47	61.44– 61.91	31	38B	State Street	No northbound exit; access via Route 2
Connecticut	Hartford	Hartford	39.55	63.65		♦	Leibert Road	Southbound exit and northbound entrance for HOV only; southern terminus of HOV lanes
Connecticut	Hartford	Hartford	39.86	64.15	33	40	Jennings Road	
Connecticut	Hartford	Windsor	41.14	66.21	34	41	Route 159 (Windsor Avenue) to Main Street	Signed for Route 159 northbound, Main Street southbound
Connecticut	Hartford	Windsor	42.20– 42.22	67.91– 67.95	35A-B	42	I-291 east / Route 218 – Windsor, Bloomfield, Manchester	Signed currently as exits 35A (I-291 east) and 35B (Route 218) southbound; exits 1A and 1C on I-291
Connecticut	Hartford	Windsor	42.22	67.95		♦	Route 218 – Windsor	Northbound exit and southbound entrance for HOV only
Connecticut	Hartford	Windsor	43.52	70.04	36	43	Route 178 (Park Avenue) – Bloomfield	
Connecticut	Hartford	Windsor	44.50	71.62	37	44	Route 305 (Bloomfield Avenue) – Windsor Center	Additional northbound exit and southbound entrance for HOV lanes
Connecticut	Hartford	Windsor	45.99	74.01		♦	Route 75 – Poquonock	Northbound exit and southbound entrance for HOV only
Connecticut	Hartford	Windsor	45.99	74.01	38	46	Route 75 / Day Hill Road – Poquonock, Windsor	
Connecticut	Hartford	Windsor	46.69– 46.98	75.14– 75.61	Northern terminus of HOV lanes			
Connecticut	Hartford	Windsor Locks	47.44	76.35	39-41	47	Kennedy Road to Center Street	Northbound exit and southbound entrance
Connecticut	Hartford	Windsor Locks	48.22	77.60	40	48	Route 20 west – Bradley International Airport	Eastern terminus of Route 20
Connecticut	Hartford	Windsor Locks	48.62	78.25	41-39	49A	Center Street	Southbound exit only
Connecticut	Hartford	Windsor Locks	49.58	79.79	42	49B	Route 159 – Windsor Locks	Will be signed as exit 49 northbound
Connecticut	Hartford	Connecticut River	49.58– 49.90	79.79– 80.31	Dexter Coffin Bridge			
Connecticut	Hartford	East Windsor	50.33	81.00	44	50	US 5 – East Windsor	
Connecticut	Hartford	East Windsor	51.09	82.22	45	51	Route 140 – Warehouse Point, Ellington	
Connecticut	Hartford	Enfield	52.74	84.88	46	53	US 5 (King Street)	
Connecticut	Hartford	Enfield	55.57	89.43	47W-E	55A-B	Route 190 – Hazardville, Somers, Suffield	Signed currently as exits 47W (Route 190 west) and exit 47E (Route 190 east)
Connecticut	Hartford	Enfield	56.10	90.28	48	56	Route 220 (Elm Street) – Thompsonville	
Connecticut	Hartford	Enfield	57.73	92.91	49	57	US 5 (Enfield Street) – Longmeadow, MA	
			58.00 0.000	93.34 0.000	Connecticut–Massachusetts state line			
Massachusetts	Hampden	Springfield	3.836	6.173	—	1	US 5 south – Forest Park, Longmeadow	Southbound exit and northbound entrance; southern end of US 5 concurrency
Massachusetts	Hampden	Springfield	3.694	5.945	—	2	Route 83 south – Forest Park, East Longmeadow	No southbound exit
Massachusetts	Hampden	Springfield	4.142	6.666	—	3	US 5 north to Route 57 west / East Columbus Avenue – West Springfield, Agawam	Columbus Avenue not signed southbound; northern end of US 5 concurrency
Massachusetts	Hampden	Springfield	4.568	7.351	5 4	4	Broad Street / Main Street	Northbound exit only
Massachusetts	Hampden	Springfield	4.722	7.599	5 4	4	Route 83 south (Main Street) – East Longmeadow	Southbound exit only
Massachusetts	Hampden	Springfield	5.253	8.454	6	5A	Union Street / MGM Way – Downtown Springfield	Signed as exit 5 northbound; Union Street not signed northbound
Massachusetts	Hampden	Springfield	5.989	9.638	7	5B	Hall of Fame Avenue – Downtown Springfield	Southbound exit and northbound entrance
Massachusetts	Hampden	Springfield	6.295	10.131	8	6	I-291 east / US 20 east to I-90 east / Mass Pike east – Boston	I-90 not signed southbound; western terminus and exits 1A and 1B on I-291 west
Massachusetts	Hampden	Springfield	6.677	10.746	9	7A-B	US 20 west / Route 20A east – West Springfield, Westfield	No southbound exit; signed as exits 7A (Route 20A east) and 7B (Route 20 west)
Massachusetts	Hampden	Springfield	7.176	11.549	10 11	8	Route 116 (Main Street)	Northbound exit and entrance
Massachusetts	Hampden	Springfield	7.481	12.040	10 11	8	Birnie Avenue to US 20 west – West Springfield	Southbound exit only
Massachusetts	Hampden	Chicopee	8.289	13.340	12	9	I-391 north – Chicopee, Holyoke	Southern terminus and exits 1A and 1B on I-391
Massachusetts	Hampden	West Springfield	9.177– 9.184	14.769– 14.780	13A-B	10A-B	US 5 (Riverdale Street) – West Springfield	Signed as exits 10A (Route 5 north) and 10B (Route 5 south)
Massachusetts	Hampden	West Springfield–Holyoke line	11.547	18.583	14	11	I-90 / Mass Pike / US 5 – Boston, Albany, NY	Exit 45 on I-90 / Mass Pike; US 5 not signed
Massachusetts	Hampden	Holyoke	12.396	19.949	15	12	Lower Westfield Road – Ingleside	
Massachusetts	Hampden	Holyoke	14.218	22.882	16	14	US 202 – Holyoke, South Hadley	
Massachusetts	Hampden	Holyoke	15.188	24.443	17	15	Route 141 – Holyoke, Easthampton	Signed as exits 15A (Route 141 east) and 15B (Route 141 west) northbound
Massachusetts	Hampshire	Northampton	22.816	36.719	18	23	US 5 – Northampton, Easthampton	Also serves Smith College
Massachusetts	Hampshire	Northampton	24.760	39.847	19	25	Route 9 – Hadley, Amherst	Northbound exit and southbound entrance; also serves Cooley Dickinson Hospital, Northampton VA Hospital
Massachusetts	Hampshire	Northampton	26.016	41.869	20	26	US 5 / Route 9 / Route 10 – Northampton, Hadley	Southbound exit and northbound entrance
Massachusetts	Hampshire	Northampton	27.277	43.898	21	27	US 5 / Route 10 – Hatfield	
Massachusetts	Hampshire	Hatfield	29.938	48.181	22	30	US 5 / Route 10 – North Hatfield, Whately	Northbound exit and southbound entrance
Massachusetts	Franklin	Whately	32.309	51.996	23	32	US 5 / Route 10 – Whately, North Hatfield	Southbound exit only
Massachusetts	Franklin	Whately	34.709	55.859	24	35	US 5 / Route 10 to Route 116 – Deerfield, Conway	No northbound entrance
Massachusetts	Franklin	Deerfield	35.891	57.761	25	36	Route 116 – Deerfield, Conway	Southbound exit and northbound entrance
Massachusetts	Franklin	Greenfield	43.011	69.219	26	43	Route 2 west / Route 2A east – Greenfield Center, North Adams	Southern end of Route 2 concurrency; also serves John W. Olver Transit Center, Mass MoCA, Shelburne Falls, Bridge of Flowers
Massachusetts	Franklin	Greenfield	45.752	73.631	27	46	Route 2 east – Boston	Northern end of Route 2 concurrency; left exit and entrance southbound
Massachusetts	Franklin	Bernardston	50.360	81.047	28	50	Route 10 – Bernardston, Northfield	Signed as exits 50A (Route 10 north) and 50B (Route 10 south) northbound
			54.90 0.000	88.35 0.000	Massachusetts–Vermont state line			
Vermont	Windham	Brattleboro	7.480	12.038	1	7	US 5 to VT 142 / VT 119 – Brattleboro, Guilford	Also serves Vernon and Hinsdale, NH
Vermont	Windham	Brattleboro	9.095	14.637	2	8	VT 9 west – Brattleboro, Bennington	Also serves Manchester via VT 30, Marlboro College, and Wilmington
Vermont	Windham	Brattleboro	11.550	18.588	3	11	US 5 / VT 9 east – Brattleboro, Keene NH	Also serves World Learning SIT Graduate Institute
Vermont	Windham	Putney	17.952	28.891	4	18	US 5 – Putney	Also serves Landmark College
Vermont	Windham	Town of Westminster	28.610	46.043	5	28	To US 5 / VT 123 – Westminster, Bellows Falls, Walpole, NH	
Vermont	Windham	Rockingham	35.200	56.649	6	35	VT 103 to US 5 – Rockingham, Rutland, Bellows Falls	Also serves Chester and Ludlow
Vermont	Windsor	Springfield	41.690	67.094	7	41	US 5 / VT 11 – Springfield	Also serves Charlestown, NH and the Fort at Number 4
Vermont	Windsor	Weathersfield	51.370	82.672	8	51	VT 131 to US 5 / VT 12 – Ascutney, Windsor	Also serves Ludlow and Claremont, NH; Romaine Tenney Memorial Park at exit
Vermont	Windsor	Hartland	60.450	97.285	9	60	US 5 / VT 12 – Hartland, Windsor	Also serves Woodstock and Killington
Vermont	Windsor	Hartford	69.810	112.348	10	69	I-89 – Concord, NH, Barre, Montpelier	Signed as exits 69A (I-89 south) and 69B (I-89 north); exits 1A and 1B on I-89
Vermont	Windsor	Hartford	70.200	112.976	11	70	US 5 – White River Junction	Also serves VA Hospital
Vermont	Windsor	Hartford	72.010	115.889	12	72	To US 5 – Wilder, White River Junction	
Vermont	Windsor	Norwich	74.830	120.427	13	74	US 5 / VT 10A – Norwich, Hanover, NH	Also serves Montshire Museum of Science
Vermont	Orange	Thetford	84.210	135.523	14	84	VT 113 to US 5 – Thetford	Also serves Chelsea and Lyme, NH
Vermont	Orange	Fairlee	91.540	147.319	15	91	US 5 – Fairlee, Orford, NH	Also serves Lake Morey and Lake Fairlee
Vermont	Orange	Bradford	97.630	157.120	16	97	VT 25 to US 5 – Bradford, Barre	Also serves Newbury and Piermont, NH
Vermont	Orange	Town of Newbury	110.340	177.575	17	110	US 302 to US 5 – Wells River, Woodsville, NH	Also serves South Ryegate and Groton
Vermont	Caledonia	Barnet	120.450	193.845	18	120	To US 5 – Barnet, Peacham	Also serves West Barnet, Monroe, NH, McIndoe Falls, and East Ryegate
Vermont	Caledonia	St. Johnsbury	128.250	206.398	19	128	I-93 south to US 3 – Littleton, NH, Concord, NH	Tri-stack interchange; northern terminus and exits 11A and 11B on I-93
Vermont	Caledonia	St. Johnsbury	128.890	207.428	20	129	US 5 – St. Johnsbury, Passumpsic	
Vermont	Caledonia	St. Johnsbury	130.600	210.180	21	130	US 2 – St. Johnsbury, Montpelier	Also serves Danville and Hardwick
Vermont	Caledonia	St. Johnsbury	132.550	213.319	22	132	To US 5 – St. Johnsbury	
Vermont	Caledonia	Lyndon	137.110	220.657	23	137	US 5 to VT 114 – Lyndonville, East Burke	Also serves Vermont State University-Lyndon
Vermont	Caledonia	Lyndon	140.178	225.595	24	140	VT 122 to US 5 / VT 114 – Sheffield, Burke, Lyndonville	Also serves Caledonia County Airport
Vermont	Orleans	Barton	155.950	250.977	25	155	VT 16 to US 5 – Barton, Glover	Also serves Hardwick and Crystal Lake
Vermont	Orleans	Barton–Orleans– Irasburg tripoint	161.410	259.764	26	161	US 5 / VT 58 – Orleans, Irasburg	Also serves Lake Willoughby and Jay
Vermont	Orleans	Derby	170.060	273.685	27	170	VT 191 to US 5 / VT 105 – Newport	Also serves Lake Memphremagog
Vermont	Orleans	Derby	172.400	277.451	28	172	US 5 / VT 105 – Newport, Derby Center	Also serves Seymour Lake and Lake Memphremagog
Vermont	Orleans	Derby	177.269	285.287	29	177	To US 5 – Derby Line	Last exit in the United States
Vermont	Orleans	Derby	177.432	285.549	Derby Line–Rock Island Border Crossing			
Vermont	Orleans	Derby	177.432	285.549			A-55 north – Magog, Sherbrooke, Montréal	Continuation into Quebec
1.000 mi = 1.609 km; 1.000 km = 0.621 mi: Concurrency terminus; HOV only; Incomplete access

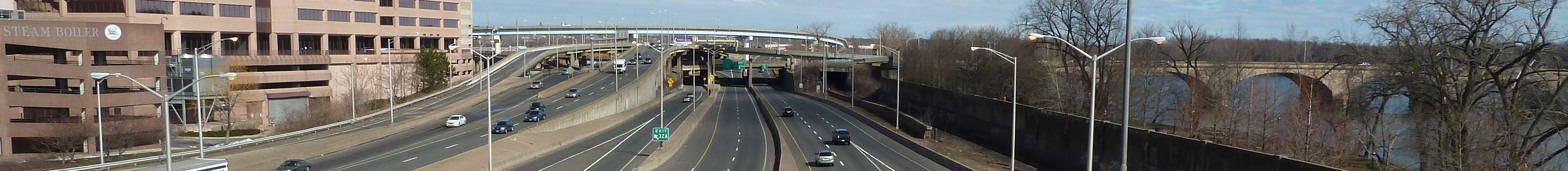
I-91 looking north in Downtown Hartford at the I-84 interchange. The Bulkeley Bridge is visible to the right.
