= Mary Ann Booth =

American microscopist, photographer

Mary Ann Allard Booth
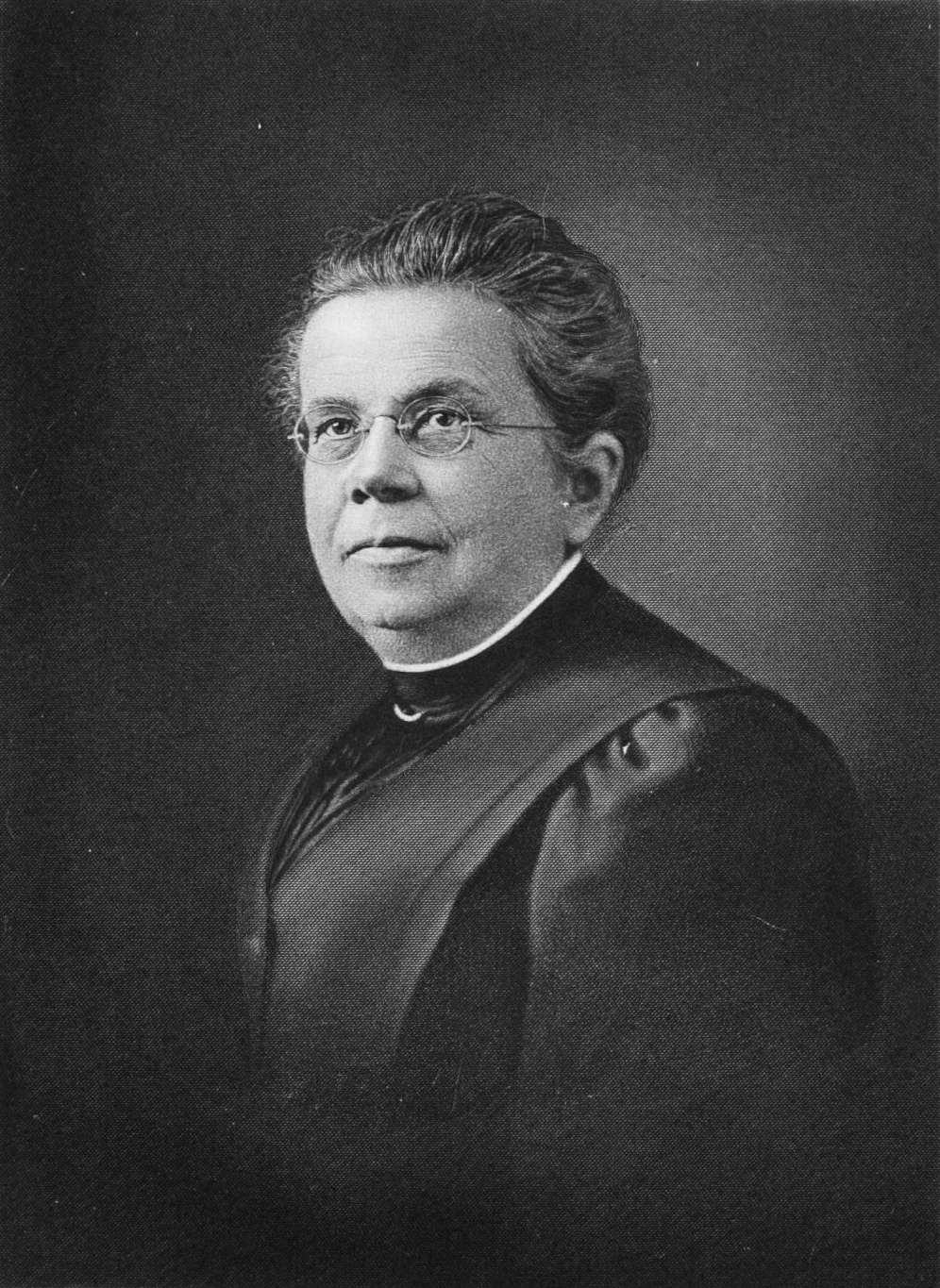
- Born: September 8, 1843; Longmeadow, Massachusetts
- Died: September 15, 1922 (aged 79)
- Scientific career
- Fields: Microscopy

Mary Ann Allard Booth (September 8, 1843 – September 15, 1922) was an American microscopist.

== Biography ==
Mary Ann Allard Booth was born on September 8, 1843, in Longmeadow, Massachusetts, to Samuel and Rhoda Colton Booth. Mary Ann was the only child of Samuel and Rhonda, but she had a half-brother from her father's first marriage. She inherited her interest in science from her father, who was a scientist. She attended public schools and Wilbraham Academy. Historical records indicate that Booth had a disability, though they do not specify the nature of her condition. In 1877, she got her first microscope. Booth had a fully equipped laboratory in her Springfield home, where she prepared and stored microscope slides. She also had an interest in photography, which she incorporated into her microscopic work. Booth travelled extensively around the United States and Canada where she would conduct lectures about photomicrography.

She was elected as one of the first female Fellows of the Royal Microscopical Society in 1889 and was also a Fellow of the American Association for the Advancement of Science. Her other association memberships include the Royal Photographic Society, the American Microscopic Society, the Brooklyn Institute of Arts and Sciences, and the Daughters of the American Revolution.

Noted for her preparation of diatoms and pollens, Booth earned a Diploma of Honor in Entomology (Women's Department) at the 1884–85 New Orleans World's Industrial and Cotton Centennial Exposition. In 1907, she famously prepared the micrographs used by Rupert Blue during his efforts to stop bubonic plague in San Francisco. Booth also donated a series of her photomicrographs to the Springfield Museum of Natural History in 1916.

In 1901, she become the second person and first woman in the town of Springfield to own an automobile. She first purchased a steam motor and later an electric runabout.

Booth died on September 15, 1922, from apoplexy.

== Microscopy ==
Booth's interest in the field of microscopy arose during one of her visits to the seashore. She observed a piece of seaweed that she received from one of her friends. These observations grew her interest and she started gathering more specimens to observe. Soon after, she got her first microscope and began preparing slides.

Whilst suffering from an illness at her home, Booth acquired skills in preparing slides for microscopy for a variety of human parasites, and was considered to have the largest private collection of them. She won a range of awards for her work, between 1900 and 1907, and was elected a fellow of the Royal Microscopical Society and Royal Photographic Society.

After capturing a bumblebee in her garden, Booth discovered that it contained seventeen different parasites. She then photographed and mounted the bumblebee using her photomicrographic camera. This discovery sparked a new interest and led her to the Pacific Coast where she extensively studied parasitic life.

Booth gained more recognition through her fight against the Bubonic Plague. From 1907 to 1908, she assisted the U.S. Surgeon General in San Francisco. She was able to document the germ-bearing fleas, which were the transmitters of the plague from rats, through photomicroscopy.

Mary Ann Booth not only created these microscope slides, but she also traveled around the United States and some parts of Canada giving lectures about her field of study. Her lectures provided an inside look into her work and included a workshop on how to make slides. Booth would also sell some of her slides at these events.

== Awards ==
Mary Ann Booth received awards at the New Orleans World Industrial and Cotton Centennial Exposition (1885) and the St. Louis Exposition (1904). Her high quality work on entomological microscope slides received a bronze plaque at the New Orleans Exposition. She then went on to receive a medal at the St. Louis Exposition for her role in helping advance the field of microscopy.

== Death ==
Mary Ann Booth died on September 15, 1922. Booth died of apoplexy in her yard while photographing squirrels, she was seventy-nine years old. She left behind a $91,314 estate. She also left behind a collection of her works to the Springfield Science Museum, Springfield, Massachusetts.
