= Athol (CDP), Massachusetts =

Athol, Massachusetts
- Census-designated place
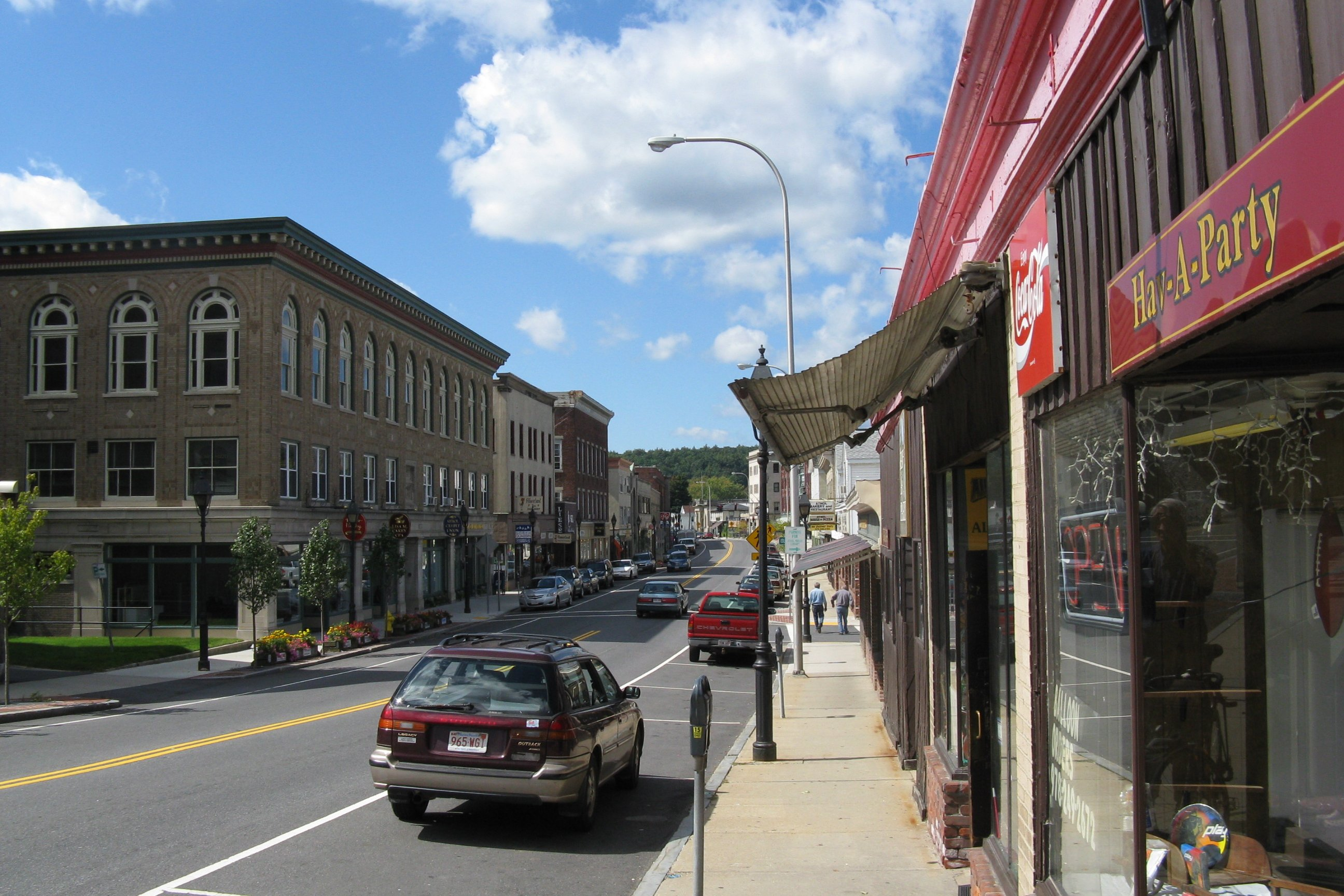
- Main Street

- Location in Worcester County and the state of Massachusetts.
- Coordinates: 42°35′31″N 72°13′49″W
- Country: United States
- State: Massachusetts
- County: Worcester

Area
  - Total: 8.47 sq mi (21.93 km^{2})
  - Land: 8.19 sq mi (21.20 km^{2})
  - Water: 0.28 sq mi (0.72 km^{2})
- Elevation: 560 ft (170 m)

Population (2020)
  - Total: 8,486
  - Density: 1,036.5/sq mi (400.21/km^{2})
- Time zone: UTC-5 (Eastern (EST))
  - Summer (DST): UTC-4 (EDT)
- ZIP Code: 01331
- Area code: 978
- FIPS code: 25-02515
- GNIS feature ID: 0609627

Athol is a census-designated place (CDP) in the town of Athol in Worcester County, Massachusetts, United States. The population was 8,265 at the 2010 census.

== Geography ==
Athol is located at 42°35′30″N 72°13′49″W (42.591911, -72.230355).

According to the United States Census Bureau, the CDP has a total area of 22.0 km^{2} (8.5 sq mi), of which 21.5 km^{2} (8.3 sq mi) is land and 0.5 km^{2} (0.19 sq mi) (2.12%) is water.

== Demographics ==
Historical population
Census	Pop.	Note	%±
2020	8,486		—
U.S. Decennial Census

As of the census of 2000, there were 8,370 people, 3,409 households, and 2,185 families residing in the CDP. The population density was 389.4 people/km^{2} (1,009 people/mi^{2}). There were 3,675 housing units at an average density of 171.0 units/km^{2} (443 units/mi^{2}). The racial makeup of the CDP was 96.01% White, 0.76% Black or African American, 0.42% Native American, 0.42% Asian, 0.02% Pacific Islander, 0.70% from other races, and 1.66% from two or more races. Hispanic or Latino of any race were 2.19% of the population.

There were 3,409 households, out of which 31.6% had children under the age of 18 living with them, 45.6% were married couples living together, 13.3% had a female householder with no husband present, and 35.9% were non-families. 30.8% of all households were made up of individuals, and 13.6% had someone living alone who was 65 years of age or older. The average household size was 2.44 and the average family size was 3.02.

In the CDP, the population was spread out, with 26.4% under the age of 18, 8.7% from 18 to 24, 28.6% from 25 to 44, 21.2% from 45 to 64, and 15.2% who were 65 years of age or older. The median age was 37 years. For every 100 females, there were 96.0 males. For every 100 females age 18 and over, there were 90.2 males.

The median income for a household in the CDP was $31,630, and the median income for a family was $39,556. Males had a median income of $33,222 versus $22,563 for females. The per capita income for the CDP was $16,062. About 9.2% of families and 10.3% of the population were below the poverty line, including 11.0% of those under age 18 and 8.7% of those age 65 or over.
