= Henry E. Bodurtha =

American politician (1865–1959)

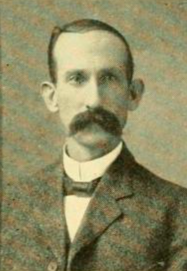
Henry Edward Bodurtha

Henry Edward Bodurtha (March 15, 1865 – December 30, 1959) was an American politician. He was the town clerk, treasurer and tax collector of Agawam, Massachusetts, and he later served as a member of the Massachusetts House of Representatives. He is the namesake of the Henry E. Bodurtha Highway in Massachusetts, the controlled-access highway portion of Massachusetts Route 57 in Agawam.

Born and raised in Agawam, Mass., he attended the local schools and graduated from Worcester Academy in 1884. On returning to Agawam, he went to work on his family's farm. He also embarked on a distinguished career of public service that would span six decades. In 1887, at the age of twenty-two, he was elected tax collector of Agawam, his first public office. He would go on to serve as the town's water commissioner (1888–90, 1905–09); a member of the Board of Selectmen (1889–90, 1895-1903); and town clerk and treasurer, a position he held for thirty-five years (1912-1947), retiring at the age of eighty-one to care for his ailing wife. He also served a term as state representative (1905), winning the election by just four votes. According to a profile published in the Springfield Union in 1947, Mr. Bodurtha's "philosophy of life consists in trying to give everyone a 'square deal.'" For his service to the community, the Board of Selectmen voted unanimously in 1960 to name the Agawam stretch of Mass. State Rt. 57 after him. Today the road is known locally as the "Henry E. Bodurtha Highway."

A prominent figure in town throughout his life, he was referred to as "Mr. Agawam" for his faithful public service. He served as Master of Ceremonies for the town's 50th anniversary celebration in 1905 and was elected "honorary marshal" of the centennial parade in 1955. He and his wife were devoted members of the Agawam Baptist Church, where Henry served as a deacon from 1904 until his death. The following appeared in the church bulletin the day after his passing: "He was a man of convictions and he was never fearful in expressing them whether people agreed with him or not. He had a quality that all of us need and this is character and this character had been nurtured on Christian truth… He was a friend of one in need and often opened his purse to lift a burden off someone's shoulders. Those acts of benevolence always went unannounced but they indicated the generosity of his spirit."
