= Suffield Depot, Connecticut =

Census-designated place in Connecticut, United States

- Census-designated place
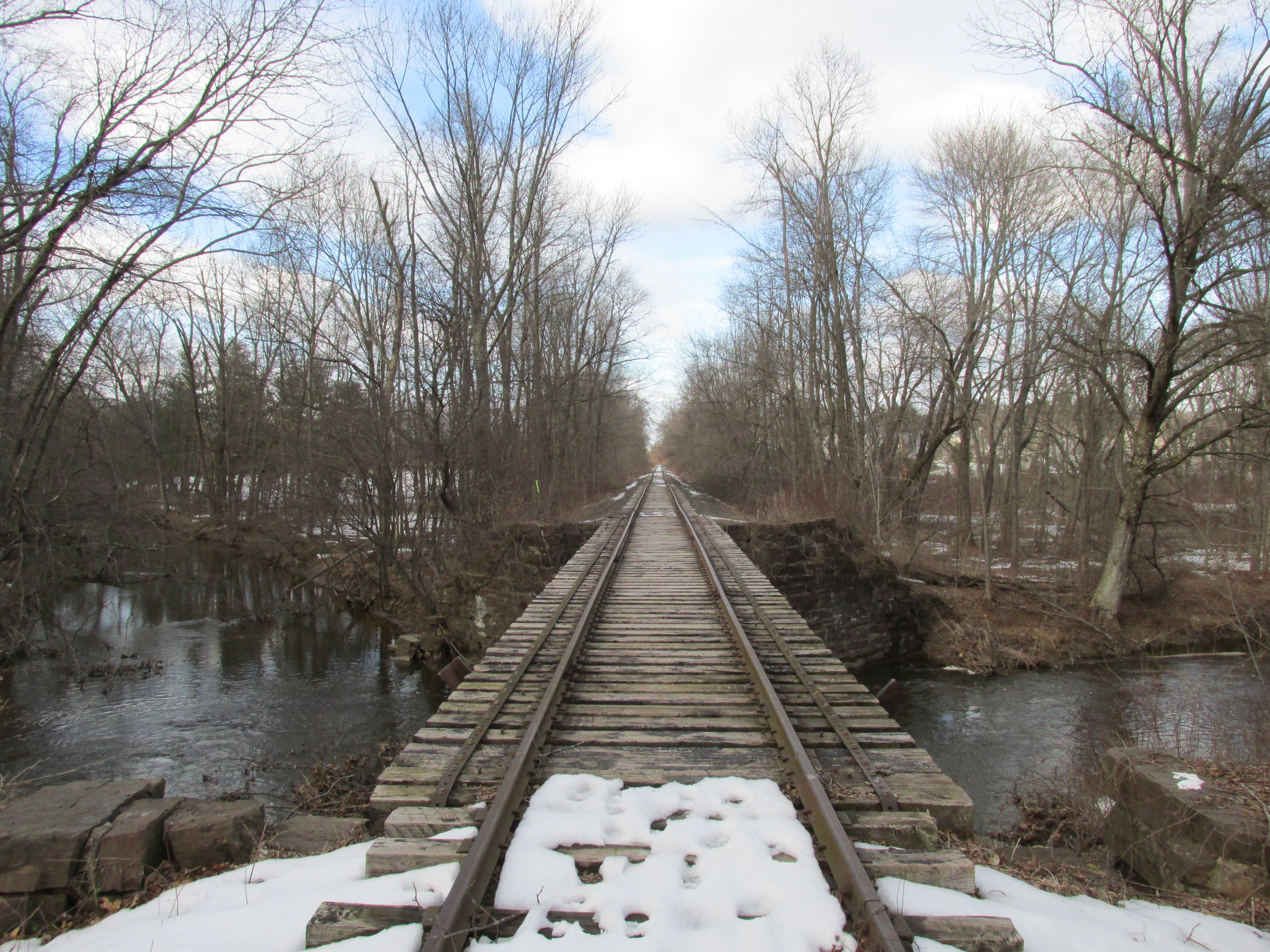
- Tracks leading to Suffield Depot

- Location within Connecticut Location within the United States
- Coordinates: 41°58′42″N 72°39′24″W
- Country: United States
- State: Connecticut
- County: Hartford
- Town: Suffield

Area
  - Total: 2.0 sq mi (5.1 km^{2})
  - Land: 2.0 sq mi (5.1 km^{2})
  - Water: 0 sq mi (0 km^{2})
- Elevation: 130 ft (40 m)

Population (2010)
  - Total: 1,325
  - Density: 670/sq mi (260/km^{2})
- Time zone: UTC-5 (Eastern)
  - Summer (DST): UTC-4 (Eastern)
- ZIP code: 06078
- Area code: 860
- FIPS code: 09-74655
- GNIS feature ID: 2377869

Suffield Depot is the name of a census-designated place (CDP) corresponding to the village of Suffield, the primary settlement of the town of Suffield, Connecticut, United States. As of the 2020 census, Suffield Depot had a population of 1,440.

== Geography ==
Suffield Depot is named for the end of a spur ex-New Haven Railroad line, leading to Suffield village from the town of Windsor Locks to the south. The center of the village is located on a ridge east of the railroad line, with a town green occupying the area around the intersection of North and South Main Street (Connecticut Route 75) with Mountain Road (Connecticut Route 168) and Bridge Street. According to the United States Census Bureau, the CDP has a total area of 2.0 square miles (5.1 km^{2}), all land.

== Demographics ==
=== 2020 census ===
As of the 2020 census, Suffield Depot had a population of 1,440. The median age was 48.8 years. 20.1% of residents were under the age of 18 and 25.1% of residents were 65 years of age or older. For every 100 females there were 85.1 males, and for every 100 females age 18 and over there were 78.7 males age 18 and over.

100.0% of residents lived in urban areas, while 0.0% lived in rural areas.

There were 682 households in Suffield Depot, of which 26.8% had children under the age of 18 living in them. Of all households, 45.0% were married-couple households, 14.1% were households with a male householder and no spouse or partner present, and 36.4% were households with a female householder and no spouse or partner present. About 37.8% of all households were made up of individuals and 21.5% had someone living alone who was 65 years of age or older.

There were 720 housing units, of which 5.3% were vacant. The homeowner vacancy rate was 1.4% and the rental vacancy rate was 4.6%.

Racial composition as of the 2020 census
Race	Number	Percent
White	1,276	88.6%
Black or African American	36	2.5%
American Indian and Alaska Native	1	0.1%
Asian	43	3.0%
Native Hawaiian and Other Pacific Islander	0	0.0%
Some other race	22	1.5%
Two or more races	62	4.3%
Hispanic or Latino (of any race)	59	4.1%

=== 2000 census ===
As of the census of 2000, there were 1,244 people, 569 households, and 298 families residing in the Suffield Depot CDP. The population density was 640.9 inhabitants per square mile (247.5/km^{2}). There were 598 housing units at an average density of 308.1 per square mile (119.0/km^{2}). The racial makeup of the CDP was 95.26% White, 3.38% African American, 0.08% Native American, 0.32% Asian, 0.80% from other races, and 0.16% from two or more races. Hispanic or Latino of any race were 2.25% of the population.

There were 569 households, out of which 26.2% had children under the age of 18 living with them, 44.5% were married couples living together, 6.2% had a female householder with no husband present, and 47.5% were non-families. 40.8% of all households were made up of individuals, and 26.2% had someone living alone who was 65 years of age or older. The average household size was 2.19 and the average family size was 3.05.

In the CDP, the population was spread out, with 23.9% under the age of 18, 4.7% from 18 to 24, 27.8% from 25 to 44, 24.0% from 45 to 64, and 19.5% who were 65 years of age or older. The median age was 42 years. For every 100 females, there were 81.1 males. For every 100 females age 18 and over, there were 73.1 males.

The median income for a household in the CDP was $42,043, and the median income for a family was $75,098. Males had a median income of $50,375 versus $32,411 for females. The per capita income for the CDP was $25,290. About 4.6% of families and 9.1% of the population were below the poverty line, including 6.1% of those under age 18 and 7.9% of those age 65 or over.
