= Agawam Center Historic District =

Historic district in Massachusetts, United States

- U.S. National Register of Historic Places
- U.S. Historic district
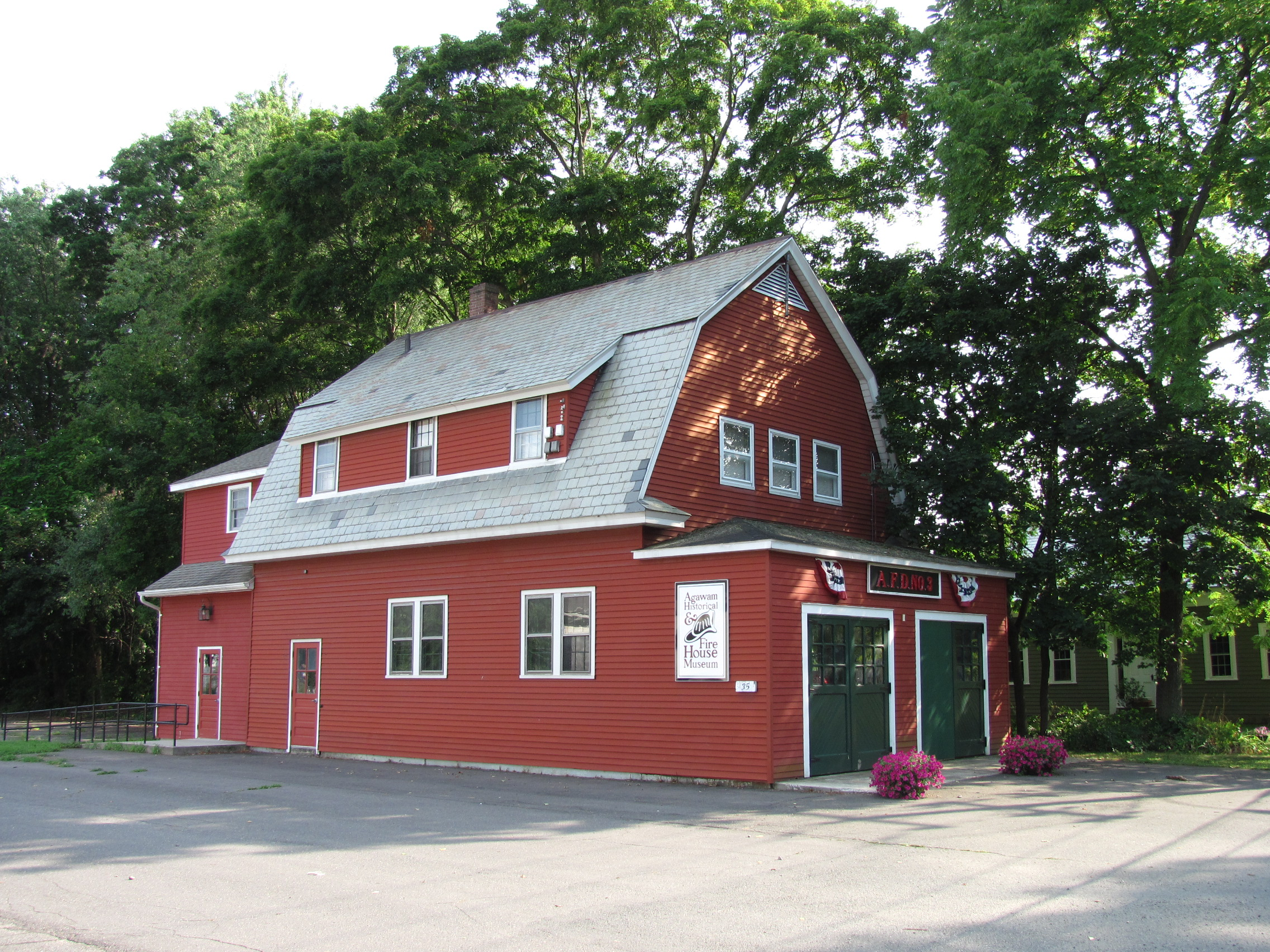
- Agawam Historical and Fire House Museum

- Location within Massachusetts Location within the United States
- Location: Agawam, Massachusetts
- Coordinates: 42°4′0″N 72°37′5″W
- Architect: Coolidge & Carlson; Paul B. Johnson
- Architectural style: Georgian, Federal
- NRHP reference No.: 01000670
- Added to NRHP: June 21, 2001

The Agawam Center Historic District is a historic district that encompasses part of the historic center of Agawam, Massachusetts. The district covers most of the buildings along Elm Street and Main Street radiating out from their intersection in both directions. The district is predominantly residential, although it does contain many commercial, industrial, and civic buildings. Many of the buildings in the district stand at a uniform setback from the street, giving the district a coherent feel.

Agawam's center began to take shape in the early years of the 18th century. By 1750 the town center lay on one of the main roads connecting Northampton to Hartford, Connecticut, and the area became a significant rest stop along the way. It received significant development in the 1790s when the road was more formally laid out, private homes began to join the taverns, and what is now Elm Street connected the village to points east and west. By 1831 the center also had churches, a school, and a cemetery. The oldest building in the district is a tavern dating to 1750, and there are about a dozen houses that date to the 1790s.

As the 19th century progressed the village continued to grow, yet retained some rural character, with only low levels of industrialization. The arrival of streetcars connecting the village to the city of Springfield saw the transformation of the village into one with a more suburban feel. Agawam was not formally incorporated until 1855, and it is during this time that the village assumed its role as the civic center of the town.

The district features a variety of architectural styles, from Georgian and Federal buildings of the early period to mid-20th century ranch housing. The district was listed on the National Register of Historic Places in 2001.

== See also ==
- National Register of Historic Places listings in Hampden County, Massachusetts
