= Longmeadow, Massachusetts =

- Town
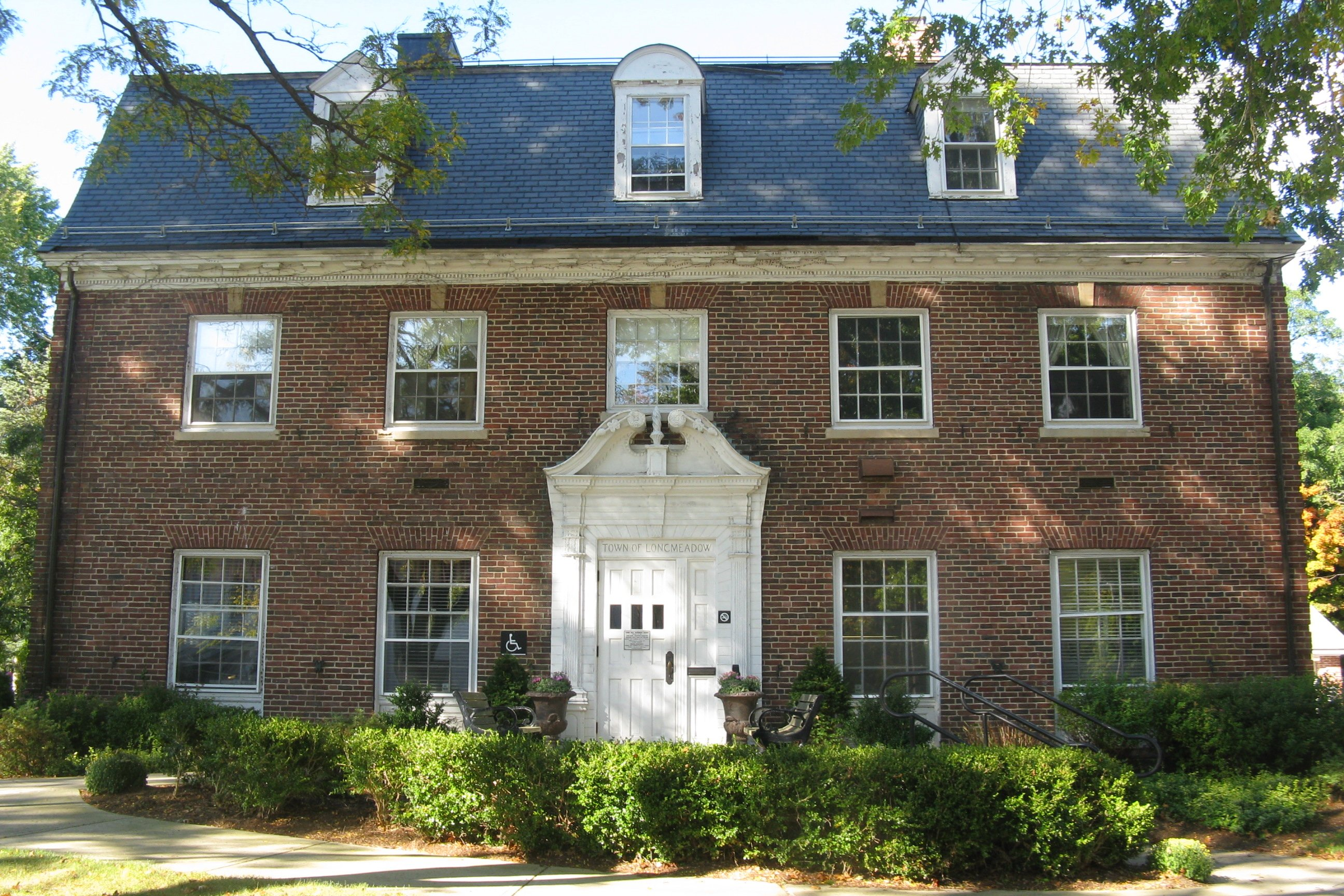
- Longmeadow Town Hall

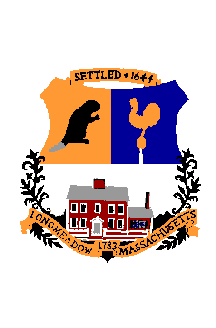
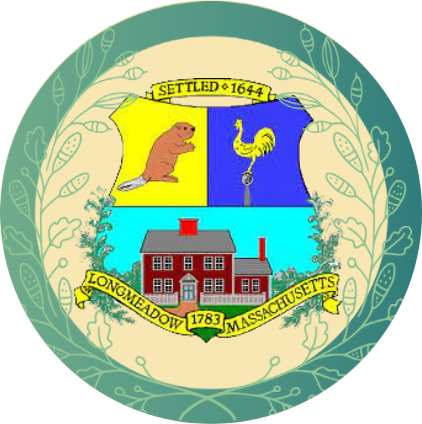
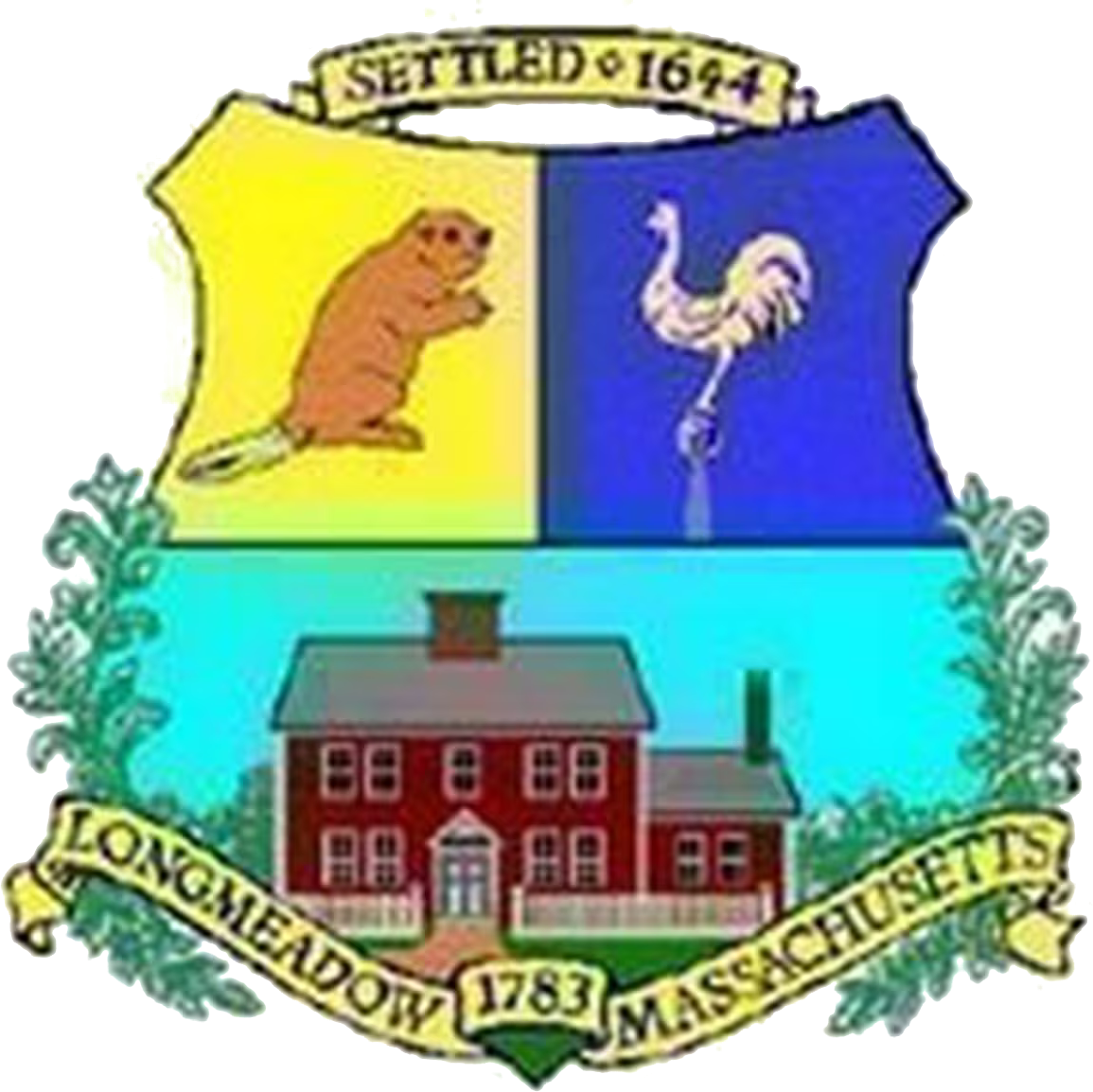
- Flag Seal Coat of arms

- Location in Hampden County in Massachusetts
- Coordinates: 42°03′00″N 72°35′00″W
- Country: United States
- State: Massachusetts
- County: Hampden
- Settled: 1644
- Incorporated: 1783

Government
  - Type: Open town meeting
  - Town Manager: Lyn Simmons
  - Select Board: Joshua Levine (Chair), Vineeth Hemavathi (Vice Chair), Shelly Maynard-DeWolf (Clerk), Andrew Lam, Dan Zwirko
  - School Committee: Michaela Fitzgerald (Chair), Nicole Choiniere (Vice Chair), Kate Bean (Clerk), Emily Hansen, Jamie Hensch, Adam Rosenblum, Zach Verriden

Area
  - Total: 9.7 sq mi (25.0 km^{2})
  - Land: 9.1 sq mi (23.6 km^{2})
  - Water: 0.50 sq mi (1.3 km^{2})
- Elevation: 161 ft (49 m)

Population (2020)
  - Total: 15,853
  - Density: 1,739.8/sq mi (671.74/km^{2})
- Time zone: UTC-5 (Eastern)
  - Summer (DST): UTC-4 (Eastern)
- ZIP Codes: 01106, 01116
- Area code: 413
- FIPS code: 25-36300
- GNIS feature ID: 0618186
- Website: www.longmeadowma.gov

Longmeadow is a town in Hampden County, Massachusetts, United States. The population was 15,853 at the 2020 census.

== History ==
Longmeadow was first settled in 1644, and officially incorporated October 17, 1783. The town was originally farmland within the limits of Springfield. It remained relatively pastoral until the street railway was built c. 1910, when the population tripled over a 15-year period. After Interstate 91 was built in the wetlands on the west side of town, population tripled again between 1960 and 1975.

During the 19th and early 20th centuries, Longmeadow was best known as the site from which Longmeadow brownstone was mined. Several famous American buildings, including Princeton University's Neo-Gothic library, are made of Longmeadow brownstone. In 1894, the more populous and industrialized "East Village" portion of the town containing the brownstone quarries split off to become East Longmeadow.

Designed by famed golf course architect Donald Ross in 1922, the Longmeadow Country Club was the proving ground for golf equipment designed and manufactured by the Spalding Co. of Chicopee. Bobby Jones, a consultant for Spalding, was a member in standing at LCC and made a number of his instructional films at LCC in the 1930s.

== Geography ==
Longmeadow is located in the western part of the state, just south of the city of Springfield, and is bordered on the west by the Connecticut River and Agawam, to the east by East Longmeadow, and to the south by Enfield, Connecticut. It extends approximately 3 miles (5 km) north to south and 4 miles (6.4 km) east to west. It is approximately 20 miles (32 km) north of Hartford.

More than 30% of the town is permanent open space. Conservation areas on the west side of town include more than 750 acres (3.0 km^{2}) bordering the Connecticut River. The area supports a wide range of wildlife including deer, beaver, wild turkeys, foxes, and eagles. Springfield's Forest Park, which at 735 acres (2.97 km^{2}) is the largest city park in New England, forms the northern border of the town. The private Twin Hills and public Franconia golf courses, plus town athletic fields and conservation land, cover nearly 2/3 of the eastern border of the town. Two large public parks, the Longmeadow Country Club, and three conservation areas account for the bulk of the remaining formal open space. Almost 20% of the houses in town are in proximity to a "dingle", a tree-lined steep-sided sandy ravine with a wetland at the bottom that provides a privacy barrier between yards.

Longmeadow has a town common, commonly referred to as "The Green", located along U.S. Route 5 on the west side of town. It is approximately 0.5 miles (0.80 km) long. Roughly 100 houses date back before 1900, most of which are in the historic district, are located near the town green. Longmeadow's Town Green is a historic district on the National Register of Historic Places, and it is surrounded by a number of buildings dating back to the 18th and 19th centuries. Longmeadow is unique as the town green has maintained its residential purpose and has resisted commercial pressure. The current function as listed by the National Register of Historic Places is domestic and landscape. The current sub-function as listed by the National Register of Historic Places is park and single dwelling. Houses along the photogenic main street (Longmeadow Street) are set back farther than in most towns of similar residential density. The town has three recently remodeled elementary schools, two secondary schools, and one high school. The commercial center of town is an area called "The Longmeadow Shops", including restaurants and clothing stores.

According to the United States Census Bureau, the town has a total area of 9.7 square miles (25.0 km^{2}), of which 9.1 square miles (23.6 km^{2}) are land and 0.50 square miles (1.3 km^{2}), or 5.34%, are water.

== Demographics ==
Historical population
Census	Pop.	Note	%±
1790	744		—
1850	1,252		—
1860	1,376		9.9%
1870	1,342		−2.5%
1880	1,401		4.4%
1890	2,183		55.8%
1900	811		−62.8%
1910	1,084		33.7%
1920	2,618		141.5%
1930	4,437		69.5%
1940	5,790		30.5%
1950	6,508		12.4%
1960	10,565		62.3%
1970	15,630		47.9%
1980	16,301		4.3%
1990	15,467		−5.1%
2000	15,633		1.1%
2010	15,784		1.0%
2020	15,853		0.4%
2024 (est.)	15,712	▼	−0.9%
U.S. Decennial Census

As of the census of 2000, there were 15,633 people, 5,734 households, and 4,432 families residing in the town. The population density was 1,732.5 inhabitants per square mile (668.9/km^{2}). There were 5,879 housing units at an average density of 651.5 per square mile (251.5/km^{2}). The racial makeup of the town was 95.42% White, 0.69% African American, 0.05% Native American, 2.90% Asian, 0.06% Pacific Islander, 0.26% from other races, and 0.62% from two or more races. Hispanic or Latino of any race were 1.09% of the population.

There were 5,734 households, out of which 37.1% had children under the age of 18 living with them, 69.1% were married couples living together, 6.4% had a female householder with no husband present, and 22.7% were non-families. 20.4% of all households were made up of individuals, and 14.0% had someone living alone who was 65 years of age or older. The average household size was 2.66 and the average family size was 3.09.

In the town, the population was spread out, with 26.8% under the age of 18, 4.6% from 18 to 24, 22.0% from 25 to 44, 28.7% from 45 to 64, and 17.8% who were 65 years of age or older. The median age was 43 years. For every 100 females, there were 87.7 males. For every 100 females age 18 and over, there were 82.0 males.

The median income for a household in the town was $109,586, and the median income for a family was $115,578. Males had a median income of $68,238 versus $40,890 for females. The per capita income for the town was $48,949. About 1.0% of families and 2.1% of the population were below the poverty line, including 0.3% of those under age 18 and 8.3% of those age 65 or over.

== Government ==
The town is chartered as an Open Town Meeting form of government. The town government also consists of a Select Board with five members, elected by the town. The public school system is governed by the School Committee. The School Committee is made up of seven voting members elected by the town, the superintendent of schools, two assistant-superintendents, a secretary, and a student representative.

== Education ==
The Longmeadow public school system operates six schools. Blueberry Hill School, Center School, and Wolf Swamp Road School are K−5 elementary schools. Williams Middle School and Glenbrook Middle School serve grades 6–8. Longmeadow High School serves all students in the town between grades 9 and 12. The town's elementary schools have been recently rebuilt, statements of interest for improvements to the two middle schools and Longmeadow High School were filed with the Massachusetts School Building Authority in 2007. In 2010, the voters of Longmeadow approved a 2.5% budget override to support the construction of a new $78 million high school. The town received an estimated $34 million in state funds to be used towards the new construction The new High School was completed and opened to students on February 26, 2013. After students and faculty had moved into the new school, the demolition of the old school was begun. The demolition was completed by June 2013. The school had its grand opening in September 2013 with both the brand new school and renovated business & administration wing open.

Longmeadow also hosts two private parochial schools, the Lubavitcher Yeshiva Academy (LYA) and St. Mary's Academy. LYA was established in 1946 in response to the Greater Springfield Jewish community's need for a quality Jewish day school. In 1999, LYA became the first Jewish day school to be accredited by the New England Association of Schools and Colleges (NEASC). The more than 90 students that the school serves each year from across the spectrum of Jewish life include orthodox, conservative, reform, and unaffiliated families. St. Mary's Academy, located behind St. Mary's Church, serves Catholic students grades Pre-K through Grade 8.

Approximately 50% of the students at Longmeadow High School participate in the music program. The choruses, band, and orchestra have won numerous gold medals at the MICCA competition. The honors chorus "Lyrics" has won numerous awards and has traveled to many places around the world on tours, such as Italy and Sweden. The wind ensemble and symphony orchestra have had the honor of performing in Indianapolis, Boston (Boston Symphony Hall), and New York (Carnegie Hall). In 2010, Longmeadow was awarded The American Prize in Orchestral Performance. The music program's crowning achievement has been receiving three national Grammy Awards based on the high level of excellence maintained throughout all groups in the music program.

Longmeadow is home to the primary campus of Bay Path University, a private undergraduate and graduate institution founded in 1897.

== Notable people ==
- Terri Alden, fictional nurse
- Barry Almeida, professional hockey player
- Erinn Bartlett, actress (Deep Blue Sea, The In Crowd)
- Mary Ann Booth, microscopist
- Kingman Brewster Jr. (1919–1988), President of Yale University and Ambassador
- Craig E. Campbell, Alaska's 10th lieutenant governor and retired Alaska National Guard lieutenant general
- Brynn Cartelli, winner of the 14th season of The Voice
- David Cohen (1917–2020), a member of the US Army, a liberator of the Ohrdruf concentration camp, and a schoolteacher
- J. H. Colton, leading 19th Century cartographer
- Bianca D'Agostino, former soccer player
- John Deluca, actor (Butchy in Teen Beach Movie)
- Damien Fahey, MTV VJ and host of Total Request Live
- Meghann Fahy, Daphne on Season 2 of The White Lotus, Sutton on Freeform's The Bold Type, One Life to Live character Hannah, Natalie on Broadway's Next to Normal
- Paul Fenton, Former NHL GM for the Minnesota Wild and scout
- Jonathan Green, British author and journalist
- Jay Heaps, former player and manager for New England Revolution of Major League Soccer
- Nathan Cooley Keep, pioneer in field of dentistry, founding dean of Harvard School of Dental Medicine
- Eric Lesser, former Massachusetts State Senator
- Aaron Lewis, guitarist and vocalist for band Staind
- Chirlane McCray, African-American writer and activist, wife of NYC mayor Bill de Blasio
- Bridget Moynahan, model and actress, star of films and TV series Blue Bloods
- Joe Philbin, NFL coach, former head coach of Miami Dolphins
- Joey Santiago, lead guitarist for influential alternative rock band Pixies
- Jim Sleeper, author and journalist
- Michael Tougias, author and speaker
