= Gay City State Park =

Connecticut State Park

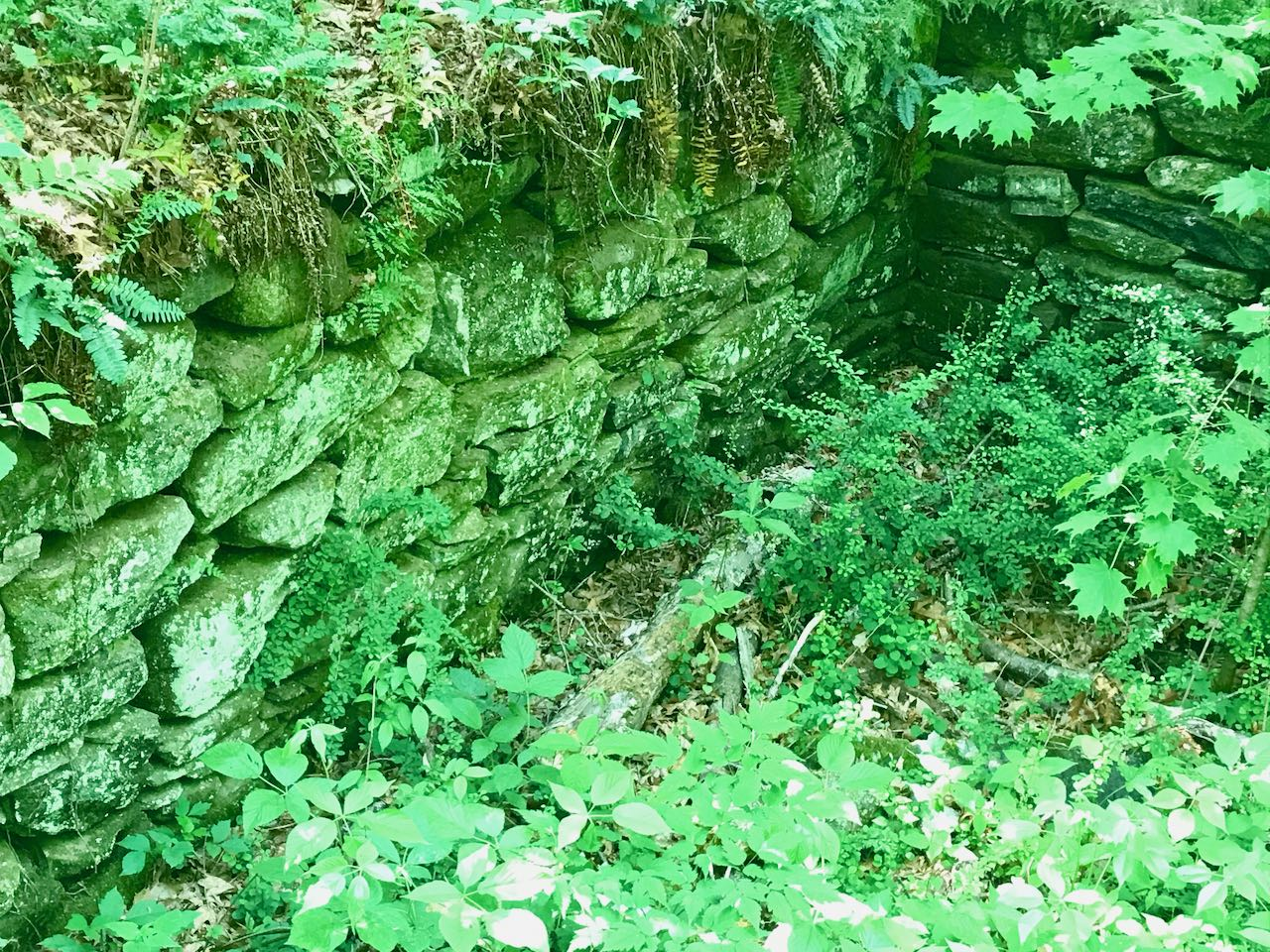
- Stone foundation south of Gay City Pond, west of Yellow Trail and Blackledge River in Connecticut's Gay City State Park.

- Location within Connecticut Location within the United States
- Location: Bolton & Hebron, Connecticut, United States
- Coordinates: 41°43′34″N 72°26′24″W
- Area: 1,569 acres (6.35 km^{2})
- Elevation: 577 ft (176 m)
- Designation: Connecticut state park
- Established: 1944
- Administrator: Connecticut Department of Energy and Environmental Protection
- Website: Gay City State Park

Gay City State Park is a public recreation area on the Blackledge River in the towns of Hebron and Bolton, Connecticut. The state park occupies 1,569 acres (635 ha) bordering Meshomasic State Forest and is accessible from State Route 85. In addition to its deep forest, millpond, and marshland, the park bears trace remnants (foundations, stone walls, and ditches) of the mill town that occupied the site for most of the 19th century. The park is managed by the Connecticut Department of Energy and Environmental Protection.

== History ==
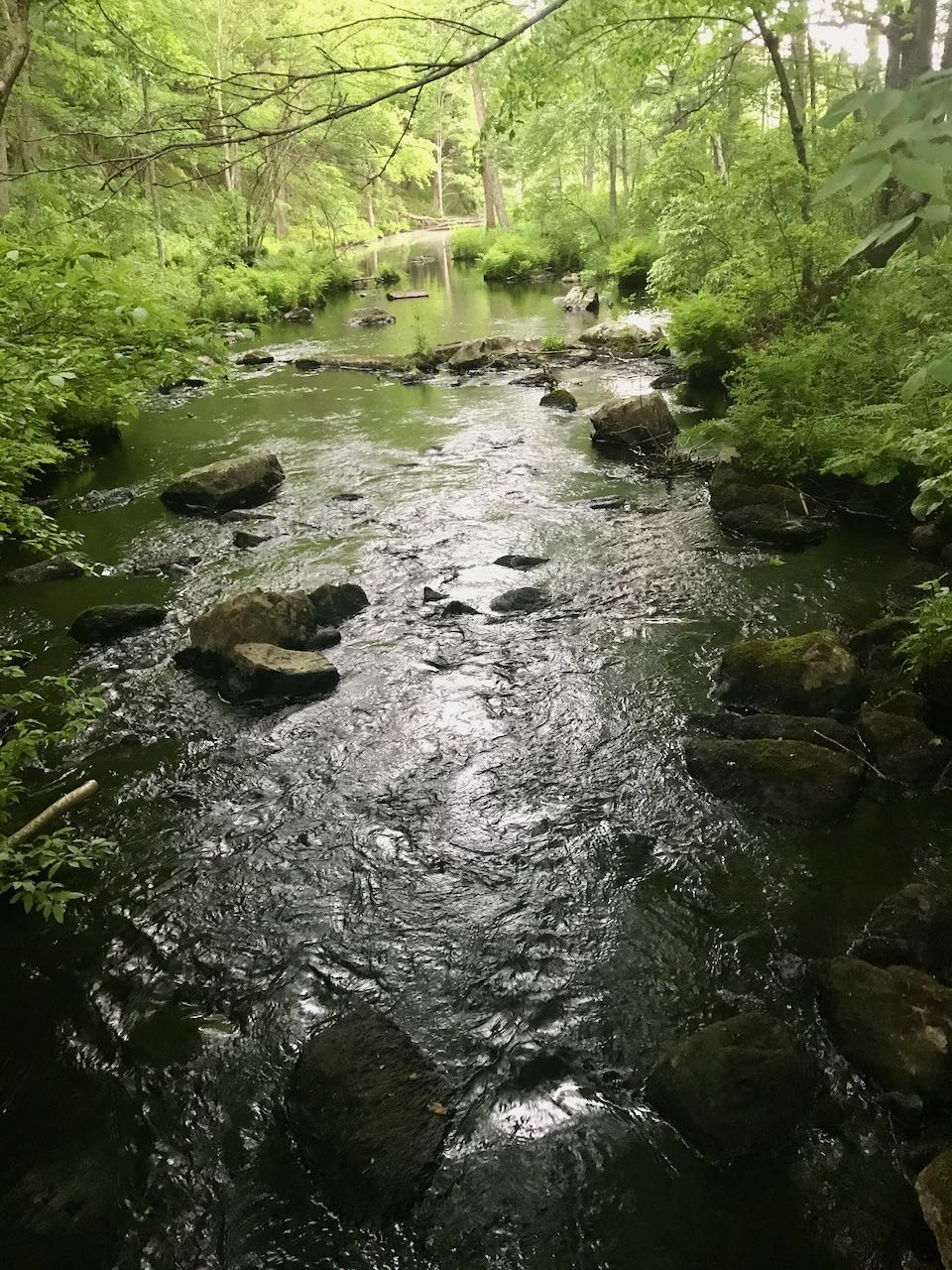
Looking southward at the Blackledge River from a foot bridge at the southernmost point on the border between Connecticut's Gay City State Park and Meshomasic State Forest.

The isolated hollow on the Blackledge River was first settled by religious leader Elijah Andrus and his followers in 1796. A succession of ill-fated mills marked the town's history—the first built around 1800 and the last burning down in 1879. Village history has also been burdened with tales of community tensions caused by the free use of alcohol during twice weekly religious services and of grisly murders gone unpunished.

Following construction of a sawmill and wool mill, the village became known as Factory Hollow and grew to about 25 families, many of whom bore the surname Gay. The wool mill's commercial success ended with the War of 1812; the mill burned down in 1830. A paper mill revived the village's fortunes but it too fell victim to fire, leading to the village's ultimate demise. The property was sold to the state by one of the town's last descendants in 1943, at which time the name Gay City was bestowed on the site. A year later the land became a state park, then entered the official roles as Connecticut's 54th state park, with 680 acres, in 1946.

== Activities and amenities ==
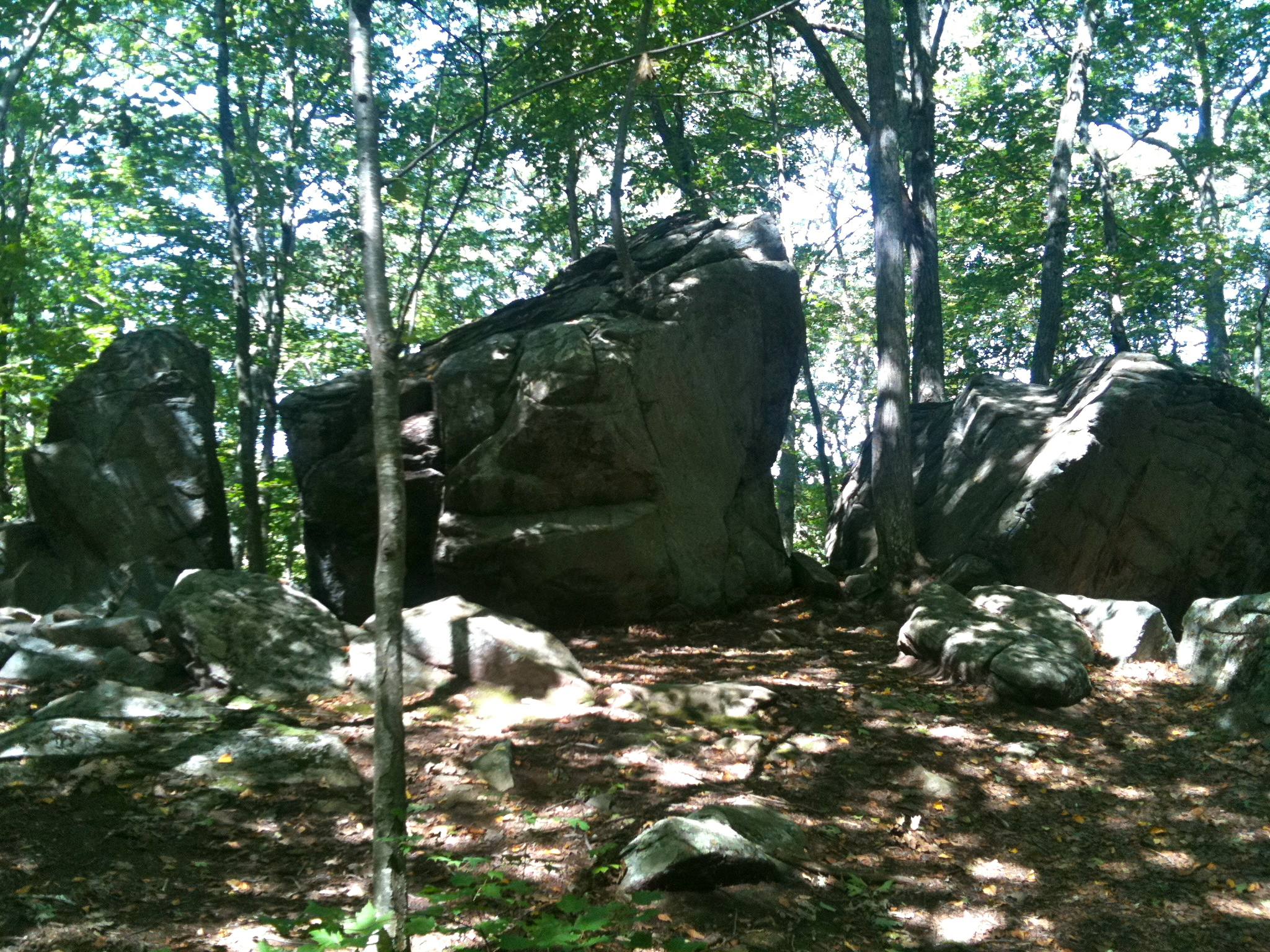
Gay City Connecticut State Park Split Rock Formation

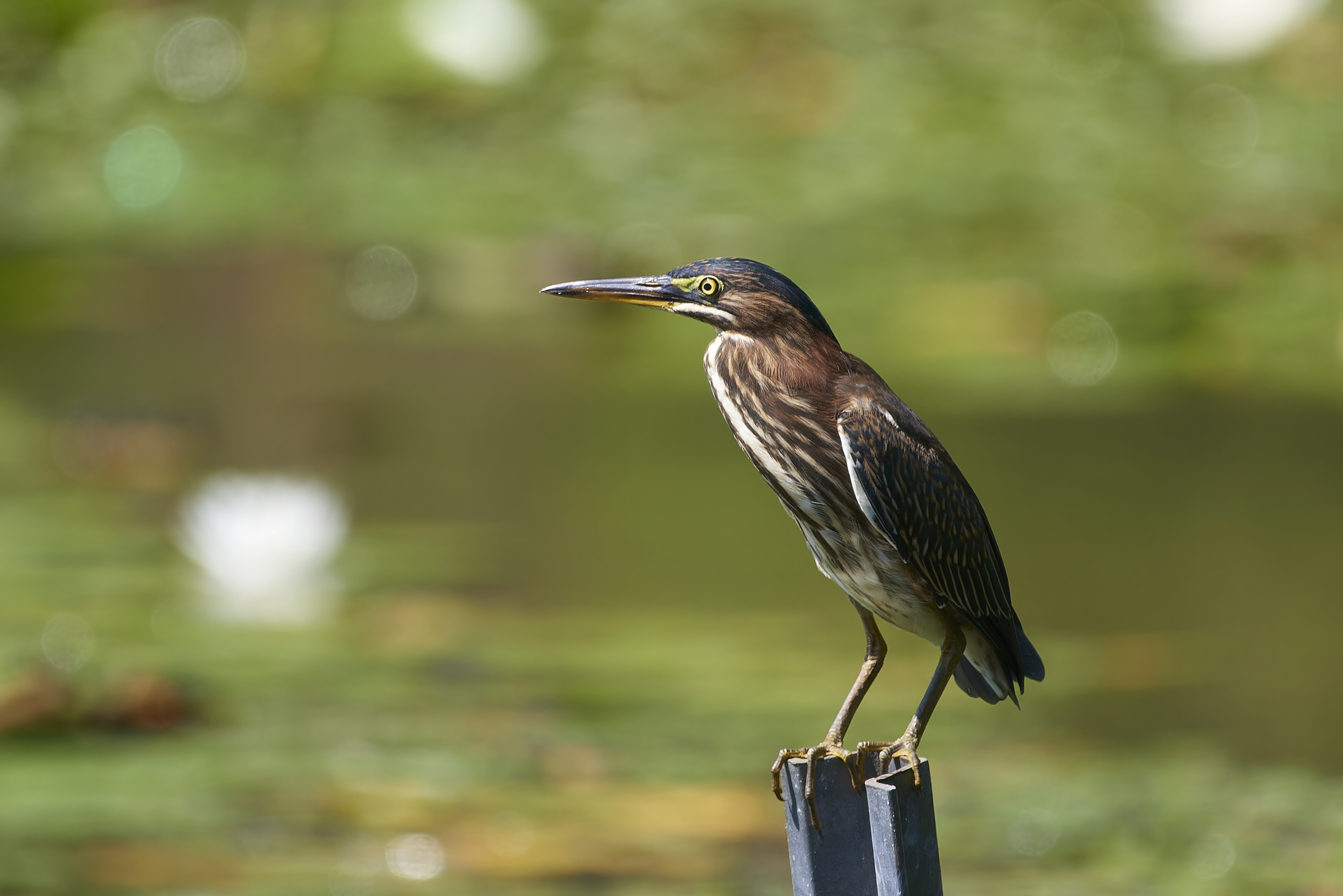
Green Heron on upper pond

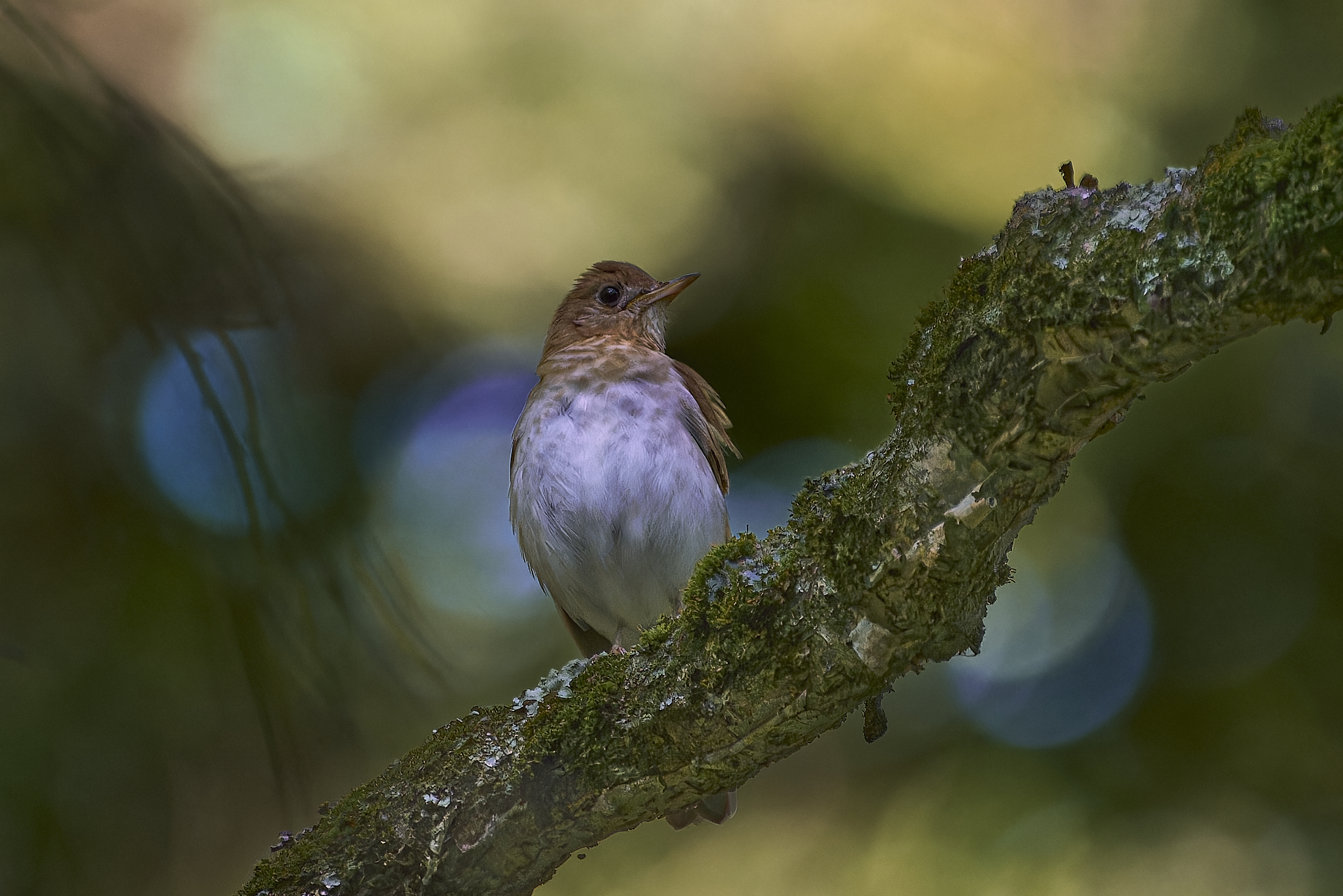
Veery

Cedar Waxwings

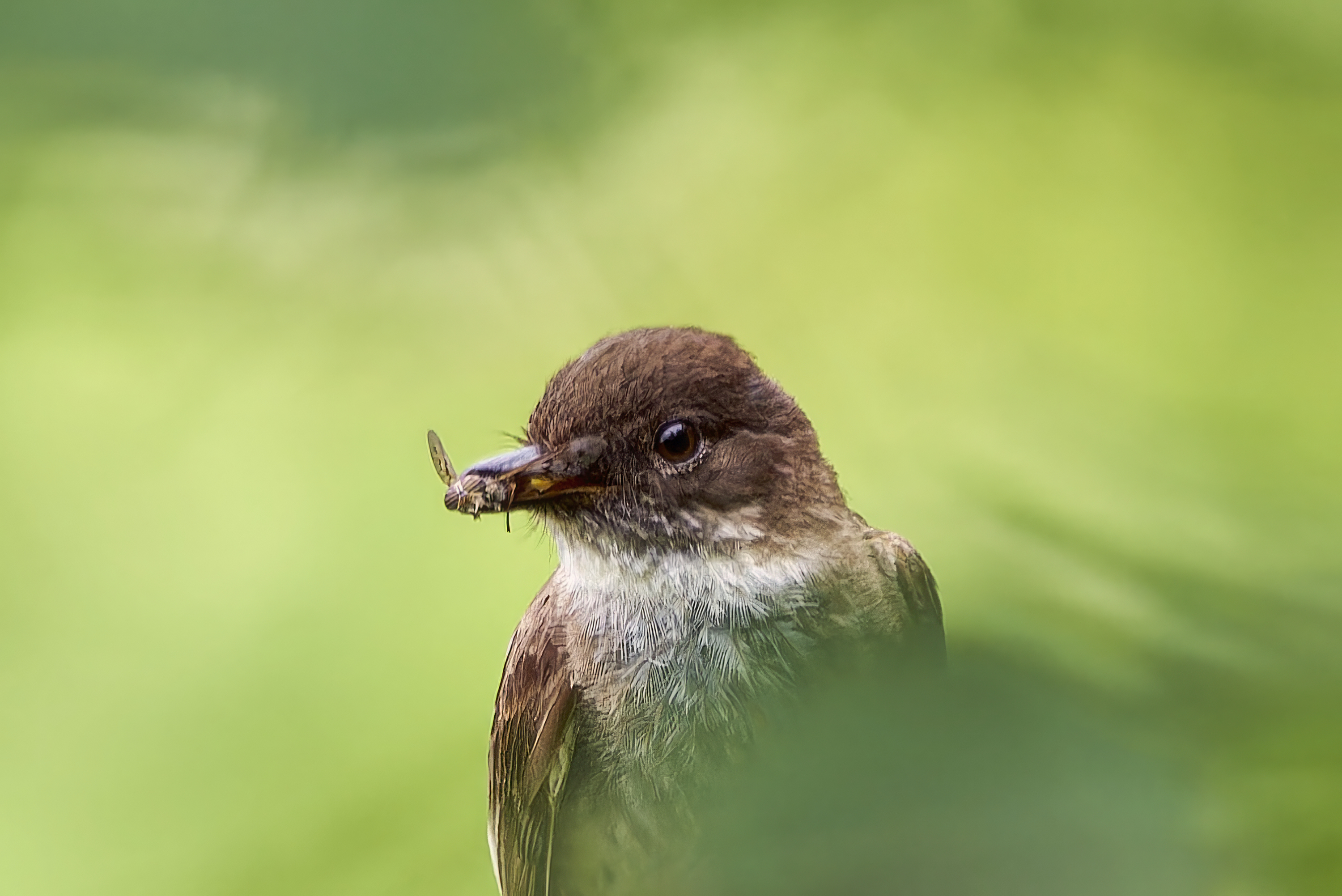
Eastern Phoebe with prey

The park offers pond fishing and swimming, picnicking, and a youth campground. The park's trail system, which is used for hiking and cycling, includes a five-mile trail that tours the entire park. Trails also connect Gay City to Blackledge Falls in Glastonbury and through the surrounding Meshomasic State Forest to Birch Mountain Road in Glastonbury where the Case Mountain trail system can be accessed.
