= Shenipsit =

Shenipsit may refer to:

- Shenipsit State Forest, Connecticut
- Shenipsit Trail, Connecticut
- Shenipsit Lake, Connecticut
