= Lake Pocotopaug, Connecticut =

Census-designated place in Connecticut, United States

- Census-designated place
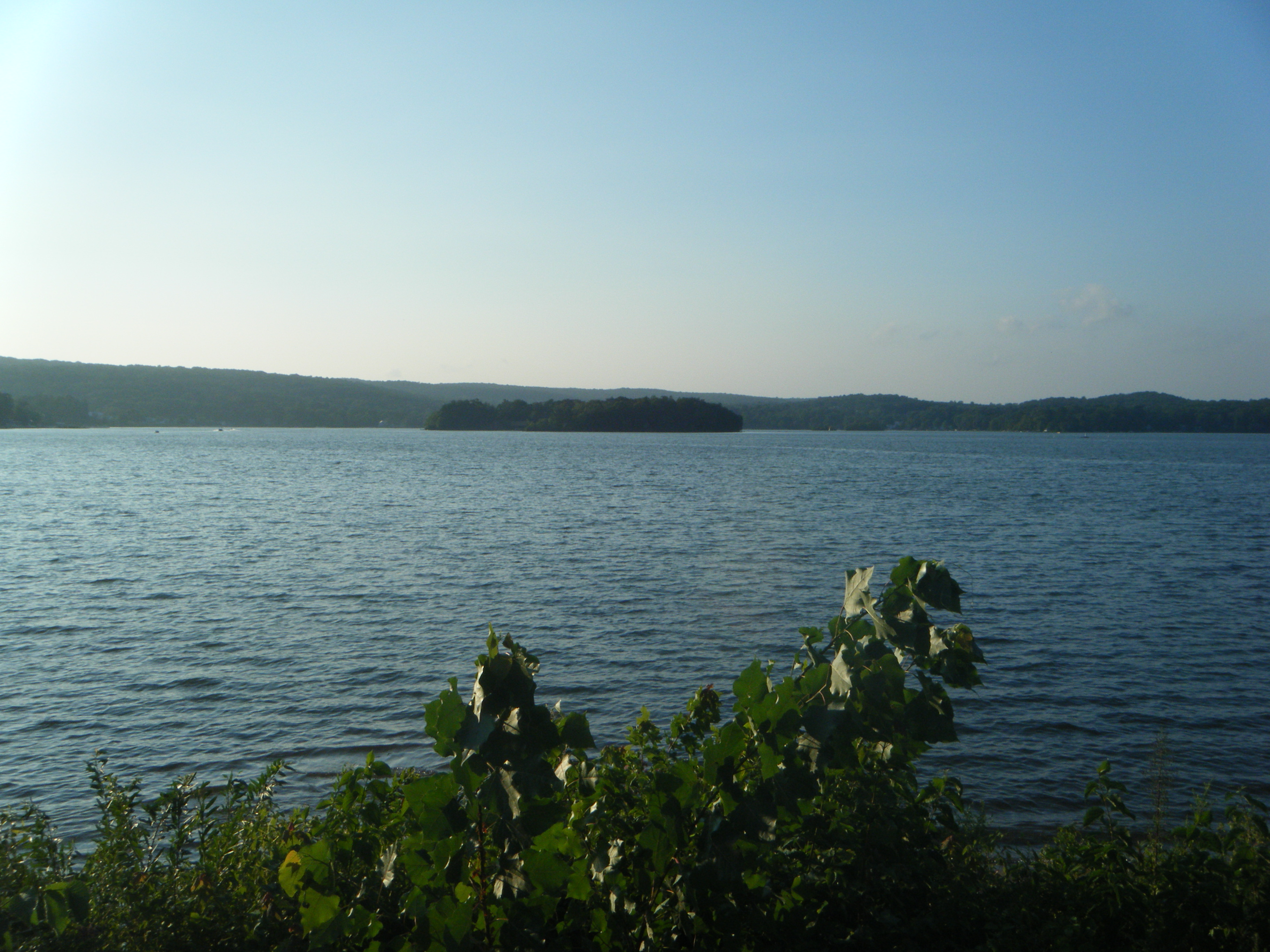
- Lake Pocotopaug

- Location within Connecticut Location within the United States
- Coordinates: 41°35′54″N 72°30′37″W
- Country: United States
- State: Connecticut
- County: Middlesex
- Town: East Hampton

Area
  - Total: 6.293 sq mi (16.30 km^{2})
  - Land: 5.491 sq mi (14.22 km^{2})
  - Water: 0.802 sq mi (2.08 km^{2})
- Elevation: 470 ft (140 m)

Population (2020)
  - Total: 4,901
  - Density: 892.6/sq mi (344.6/km^{2})
- Time zone: UTC-5 (Eastern (EST))
  - Summer (DST): UTC-4 (EDT)
- ZIP Code: 06424 (East Hampton)
- Area codes: 860/959
- FIPS code: 09-41410
- GNIS feature ID: 2377828

Lake Pocotopaug is an unincorporated village and census-designated place (CDP) in the town of East Hampton in Middlesex County, Connecticut, United States. As of the 2020 census, it had a population of 4,901, up from 3,436 in 2010.

It is named for the large local lake, which for years has been a popular resort area. The lake is surrounded by numerous homes. Most are year-round residences, although some summer cottages dot the shore. It is especially noted for two islands in its center, separated by a narrow, shallow strait (both of which have cabins).

== The lake ==
Lake Pocotopaug, at 512 acres (207 ha), is large, but many other lakes in Connecticut are larger. The largest by far, is Candlewood Lake at 5,064 acres (2,049 ha).

The lake's name reportedly comes from the local Wangunk Indian language for "Lake with Pierced Islands" or "Divided Pond". According to local legend, some time long before the area was settled by whites, the tribe living there felt they were being cursed by their irritable Great Spirit. To try to appease him, the main chief agreed to sacrifice his daughter, who willingly threw herself into the lake and drowned. The tribe's shamans announced that never again would an Indian be killed on the lake.

The Wangunk were also said to have hunted on Spellman's Point, now a quaint street lined with cottages, using loud noises to scare the animals to the end of the peninsula, and thereby an effective way to gather food. However, in the mid-to-late 1800s it was sold for a sack of beans to the "Bay point" society.

Sears Park is located at the lake and has various swimming, boating and recreational facilities for residents.

In recent years the lake has become a place of ecological study due to the large-scale algae blooms that started appearing in 2000. Tests have shown that increasing watershed land development and fertilizer use are causing issues. A town-sanctioned Lake Commission and the Friends of Lake Pocotopaug are two organizations concentrating on improvement ideas.

In late spring and summer 2020, a rehabilitation project began, focusing on pumping fresh air into the lake bottom at multiple sites around the lake. These were added throughout the lake in a stepwise process. Additionally, a "bioblast" treatment with favorable bacterial organisms was completed in early August 2020. Within a single season, water clarity increased and has been steadily improving. This successful intervention has interrupted nearly two decades of regular summer algae blooms, with no significant bloom occurring in 2020. Dramatic improvement in the lake's water quality has resulted. How long term this improvement will be sustained remains to be seen.

The lake has scattered rock hazards, including one marked by a small memorial lighthouse in its southeast portion. "Claudia's Light - 2006" is identified on the base. The lighthouse has undergone a restoration and repainting by good samaritans, brothers Dalton and Cole Peszynski and the light is back to a functional state thanks to the restoration

== Geography ==
Lake Pocotopaug is in northeastern Middlesex County, in the northern part of the town of East Hampton. The Lake Pocotopaug CDP covers the lake and includes the surrounding highlands. It is bordered to the south by the village of East Hampton and to the west by Meshomasic State Forest.

According to the United States Census Bureau, the Lake Pocotopaug CDP has a total area of 6.3 square miles (16 km^{2}), of which 5.5 square miles (14 km^{2}) are land and 0.8 square miles (2.1 km^{2}) (12.74%) are water. The lake drains to the south into the village of East Hampton and continues down Pocotopaug Creek and Pine Brook into the Salmon River, a tributary of the Connecticut River.

== Demographics ==
=== 2020 census ===
As of the 2020 census, Lake Pocotopaug had a population of 4,901. The median age was 46.4 years. 19.9% of residents were under the age of 18 and 19.8% of residents were 65 years of age or older. For every 100 females there were 99.8 males, and for every 100 females age 18 and over there were 96.8 males age 18 and over.

96.8% of residents lived in urban areas, while 3.2% lived in rural areas.

There were 2,150 households in Lake Pocotopaug, of which 28.6% had children under the age of 18 living in them. Of all households, 49.2% were married-couple households, 17.1% were households with a male householder and no spouse or partner present, and 26.0% were households with a female householder and no spouse or partner present. About 30.5% of all households were made up of individuals and 12.8% had someone living alone who was 65 years of age or older.

There were 2,427 housing units, of which 11.4% were vacant. The homeowner vacancy rate was 1.6% and the rental vacancy rate was 7.2%.

Racial composition as of the 2020 census
Race	Number	Percent
White	4,400	89.8%
Black or African American	66	1.3%
American Indian and Alaska Native	3	0.1%
Asian	99	2.0%
Native Hawaiian and Other Pacific Islander	2	0.0%
Some other race	49	1.0%
Two or more races	282	5.8%
Hispanic or Latino (of any race)	200	4.1%

=== 2000 census ===
As of the 2000 census, there were 3,169 people, 1,347 households, and 844 families residing in the CDP. The population density was 456.6/km^{2} (1,183.9/mi^{2}). There were 1,532 housing units at an average density of 220.7/km^{2} (572.3/mi^{2}). The racial makeup of the CDP was 96.81% White, 0.95% African American, 0.35% Native American, 0.92% Asian, 0.03% Pacific Islander, 0.03% from other races, and 0.92% from two or more races. Hispanic or Latino of any race were 1.01% of the population.

There were 1,347 households, out of which 32.0% had children under the age of 18 living with them, 49.1% were married couples living together, 10.2% had a female householder with no husband present, and 37.3% were non-families. 29.0% of all households were made up of individuals, and 8.0% had someone living alone who was 65 years of age or older. The average household size was 2.35 and the average family size was 2.92.

In the CDP, the population was spread out, with 23.4% under the age of 18, 6.6% from 18 to 24, 35.1% from 25 to 44, 25.1% from 45 to 64, and 9.8% who were 65 years of age or older. The median age was 38 years. For every 100 females, there were 102.9 males. For every 100 females age 18 and over, there were 100.4 males.

The median income for a household in the CDP was $58,325, and the median income for a family was $71,667. Males had a median income of $51,440 versus $37,891 for females. The per capita income for the CDP was $28,317. About 3.2% of families and 5.1% of the population were below the poverty line, including 4.1% of those under age 18 and 11.8% of those age 65 or over.
