= Thomas Tallman =

American politician (1815–1872)

Member of the Connecticut House of Representatives
- In office 1866–1867

Personal details
- Born: June 12, 1815 Chatham, Connecticut, U.S.
- Died: October 9, 1872 (aged 57) Thompson, Connecticut, U.S.
- Spouse(s): Frances M. Hazleton (m. 1842; died 1860) Hannah C. Graves (m. 1864)
- Children: 4
- Education: Yale College; Yale Theological Seminary
- Occupation: Politician; minister

Thomas Tallman (June 12, 1815 – October 9, 1872) was an American minister and politician from Connecticut.

== Early life ==
Thomas Tallman was born on June 12, 1815, in the parish of Middle Haddam (in Chatham), Connecticut, to Susan and Eleazar Tallman. He graduated from Yale College in 1837. He studied theology in Yale Theological Seminary for three years after leaving college.

== Career ==
Tallman was ordained pastor of the Congregational Church in Scotland, Connecticut, on March 20, 1844. From this charge he was dismissed on June 26, 1861. From July 1861 to November 1863, he worked at the Congregational Church in Groton.

In 1864, Tallman moved to Thompson. He worked there until his death, preaching in Westminster from 1864 to 1865 and in East Putnam from April 1868 to November 1869.

Tallman served in the Connecticut House of Representatives from 1866 to 1867.

== Personal life ==
Tallman married Frances M. Hazleton, daughter of Simon Hazleton, of Haddam on May 17, 1842. They had a son and a daughter. His wife died in 1860. He married Hannah C. Graves of Thompson on April 27, 1864. They had a son and a daughter.

Tallman died of a cartilaginous tumor in his abdomen on October 9, 1872, in Thompson.
