= Fitch Waterman Taylor =

American minister and writer

Fitch Waterman Taylor (August 4, 1803 – July 24, 1865) was an American minister, chaplain, and author.

He was the son of Col. Jeremiah and Lucy Taylor, of Middle Haddam, Connecticut, and was born August 4, 1803.

He went to New York City at the age of fifteen, with a mercantile life in view, but a change in his religious views led him after two or three years to enter on a course of study in preparation for the ministry of the Protestant Episcopal Church. He graduated from Yale College in 1828. His first charge was in the Episcopal Diocese of Maryland. In 1841 he received the appointment of Chaplain in the U. S. Navy, which he held twenty-four years, being at the time of his death the Senior Chaplain in the service. In the course of his sea service he made a voyage around the world on the USS Columbia, an account of which he published under the title of The Flag Ship. He also published other works, and at his death left behind him several volumes in manuscript.

He died in Brooklyn, L. I., July 24, 1865, aged 62 years.

In 1844 he changed his name to Fitch Welwyn Taylor.

His brother James Brainerd Taylor was also an Episcopal preacher.
