= Harold Meade =

American mass murderer and suspected serial killer

- Born: Harold W. Meade; 1948
- Died: 2007 (aged 58–59); Suffield, Connecticut, US
- Penalty: Life imprisonment

Details
- Victims: 3 convicted, 4-7+ suspected
- Date: August 12, 1970
- Country: United States
- State: Connecticut
- Date apprehended: December 11, 1970

Harold W. Meade was an American mass murderer and suspected serial killer who bludgeoned three mentally disabled individuals to death on August 12, 1970, in New Haven, Connecticut. He was later arrested in December of the same year, and pleaded guilty to the murders in 1972. In addition to the three murders he was convicted of, Meade is suspected of committing several other killings in Connecticut dating back to 1969. Meade died from an illness in prison.

== Early life and criminal history ==
Meade's father owned a gas station in Bethany, Connecticut. When Meade was an adult, he married his first wife, Donna Meade. They had two children together. Meade worked as a truck driver, milkman, and ice cream vendor.

=== Connecticut child murders ===
Meade is suspected of murdering at least four young girls in Southern Connecticut from 1969 to 1970. The victims were:

- On May 18, 1969, 11-year-old Diane Toney – dressed for Spring in a green polka-dot dress - went missing from the annual Freddy Fixer parade in New Haven, Connecticut. Her remains were found in the Meshomasic State Forest on September 13. She had been bludgeoned to death with a rock.
- On May 27, 1969, 10-year-old Mary Katherine Mount was kidnapped near her New Canaan home in Kiwanis Park in Fairfield County, Connecticut; her body was found in Wilton, near a reservoir, on June 18 by two teenaged fishermen. She had been bludgeoned and mutilated.
- On May 29, 1969, 14-year-old Dawn Cave disappeared after storming out of her Bethany, Connecticut home following a fight with a sibling. Her body was found the following day in a hay field in New Haven face up, ringed by a circle of stones in a makeshift grave, by a young girl looking for her horse.
- 5-year-old Jennifer Noon was last seen alive on September 29, 1970, as she walked from her school in New Haven, Connecticut, to her home to eat lunch. Eight days later she was found dumped in the woods in the Evergreen Avenue section of Hamden, Connecticut. She had been beaten to death with a rock.

Circumstantial evidence and witness statements connect Meade to each crime. Meade was never charged with any of these murders because his public defender made a plea deal with the prosecution which stated that if Meade confessed to the three murders he was convicted of, authorities could not charge him with any other murders. In 1996, an inmate told his lawyer that Meade confessed to murdering Toney. Meade also allegedly stated that the police could never connect him to the case unless they found the girl's underwear.

According to a New Haven detective who investigated the West Rock murders, one of Meade's routes as a milkman went through New Canaan, the neighborhood Mary Mount lived in. However, Meade denied this accusation. During his interrogation, police asked Meade if he killed Mount, and Meade replied that he could not remember.

Meade's father owned a gas station in Bethany, about two miles away from where Cave was murdered. Additionally, a woman who lived near the field where Cave's body was found claimed that she saw a man matching Meade's description grab a girl and take her behind a stone wall. The man later emerged from the wall with blood on his hands and drove away. A state trooper also claimed that Meade confessed to killing Cave to him while in prison. However, Meade also denied this. Another witness claimed to have seen Noon getting into car with a man who looked like Meade.

=== West Rock Park murders ===
On August 12, 1970, Meade bludgeoned three people to death with a boulder in West Rock Park, Connecticut. The victims were Sandra Hedler, 15, Donna Schlitter, 23, and William White, 20. They were developmentally disabled residents of the nearby New Haven Regional Center. Later that same day, the bodies of Hedler and Schlitter were found behind a ventilator shaft in a tunnel of the park. White was found alive in the nearby woods, but died in St. Raphael's Hospital seventeen days later.

Several witnesses around the park at the time of the crime told police that they saw a late-model blue car in the area. Using this information, the police investigated hundreds of cars in the area with this description, one of them belonging to Meade. After uncovering more evidence linking Meade to the crime, he was arrested and charged with the murders on December 11, 1970. Meade pleaded guilty to three counts of second degree murder and was sentenced to life in prison with the possibility of parole on April 27, 1972.

=== Murder of Linda Rayner ===
On the afternoon of June 26, 1992, 43-year-old Linda Rayner was bludgeoned to death with a rock in a remote area of Hammonasset Beach State Park. Before her body was discovered, a rainstorm and high-tide caused the majority of forensic evidence to wash away, and DNA of the perpetrator was never recovered. Although an award of $50,000 was offered for information leading to the arrest of a suspect, no one was ever charged with Rayner's murder.

On the same day, Meade and his second wife were celebrating their second anniversary by renting a cabin at Hammonasset Beach. Many suspected that Meade was responsible for Rayner's murder because of his similar modus operandi. Although Meade was never charged in the murder, he was removed from the prison's furlough program and placed in a higher security level. Meade denied murdering Rayner and was angry that his furlough privileges had been revoked.

== Incarceration and death ==
While imprisoned, Meade worked as a prison photographer and worked with outdoor maintenance crews. Meade was described as a model prisoner by guards and counselors, who wrote letters of recommendation about him to the parole board. He was praised for his work ethic and ability to befriend others.

Between 1985 and 1993, Meade was granted 184 one-day furloughs and 68 weekend furloughs from prison. While on furlough, he met and married his second wife. Harold Meade died from an illness in 2007 while incarcerated.
