= East Hampton (CDP), Connecticut =

Census-designated place in Connecticut, United States

East Hampton, Connecticut
- Census-designated place
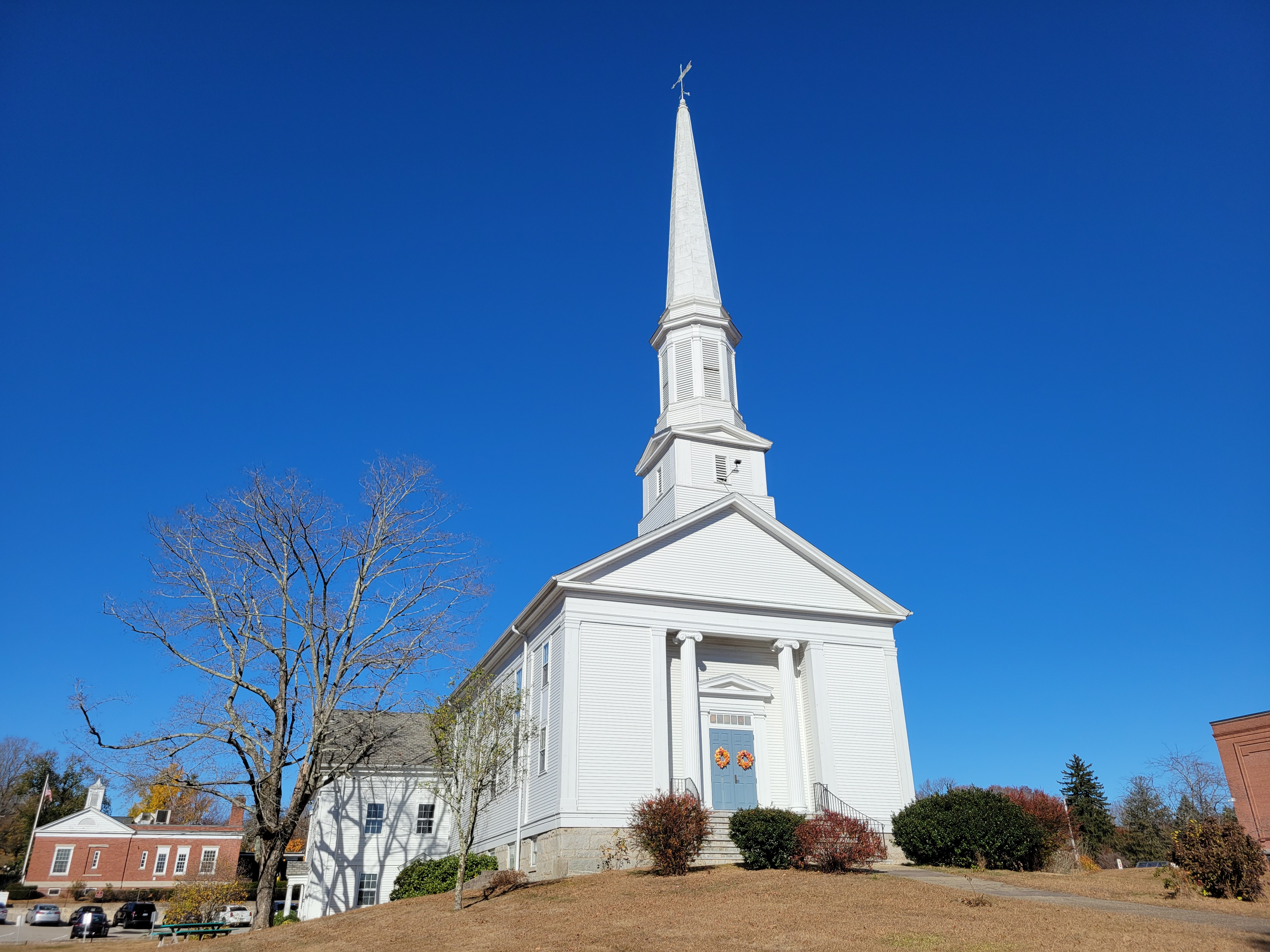
- Congregational Church of East Hampton

- Location within Connecticut Location within the United States
- Coordinates: 41°34′32″N 72°30′8″W
- Country: United States
- State: Connecticut
- County: Middlesex
- Town: East Hampton

Area
  - Total: 4.07 sq mi (10.54 km^{2})
  - Land: 4.05 sq mi (10.49 km^{2})
  - Water: 0.019 sq mi (0.05 km^{2})
- Elevation: 398 ft (121 m)

Population (2020)
  - Total: 2,960
  - Density: 731/sq mi (282.2/km^{2})
- Time zone: UTC-5 (Eastern (EST))
  - Summer (DST): UTC-4 (EDT)
- ZIP Code: 06424
- Area codes: 860/959
- FIPS code: 09-22420
- GNIS feature ID: 2377817

East Hampton is a census-designated place (CDP) comprising the primary village and adjacent residential and rural land in the town of East Hampton, Middlesex County, Connecticut, United States. It is in the central and eastern portions of the town, bordered to the north by the East Hampton community of Lake Pocotopaug and to the east by the town of Colchester in New London County and the town of Marlborough in Hartford County. As of the 2020 census, the East Hampton CDP had a population of 2,960, out of 12,717 in the entire town of East Hampton.
