= Case Mountain =

Mountain in Manchester, Connecticut, US

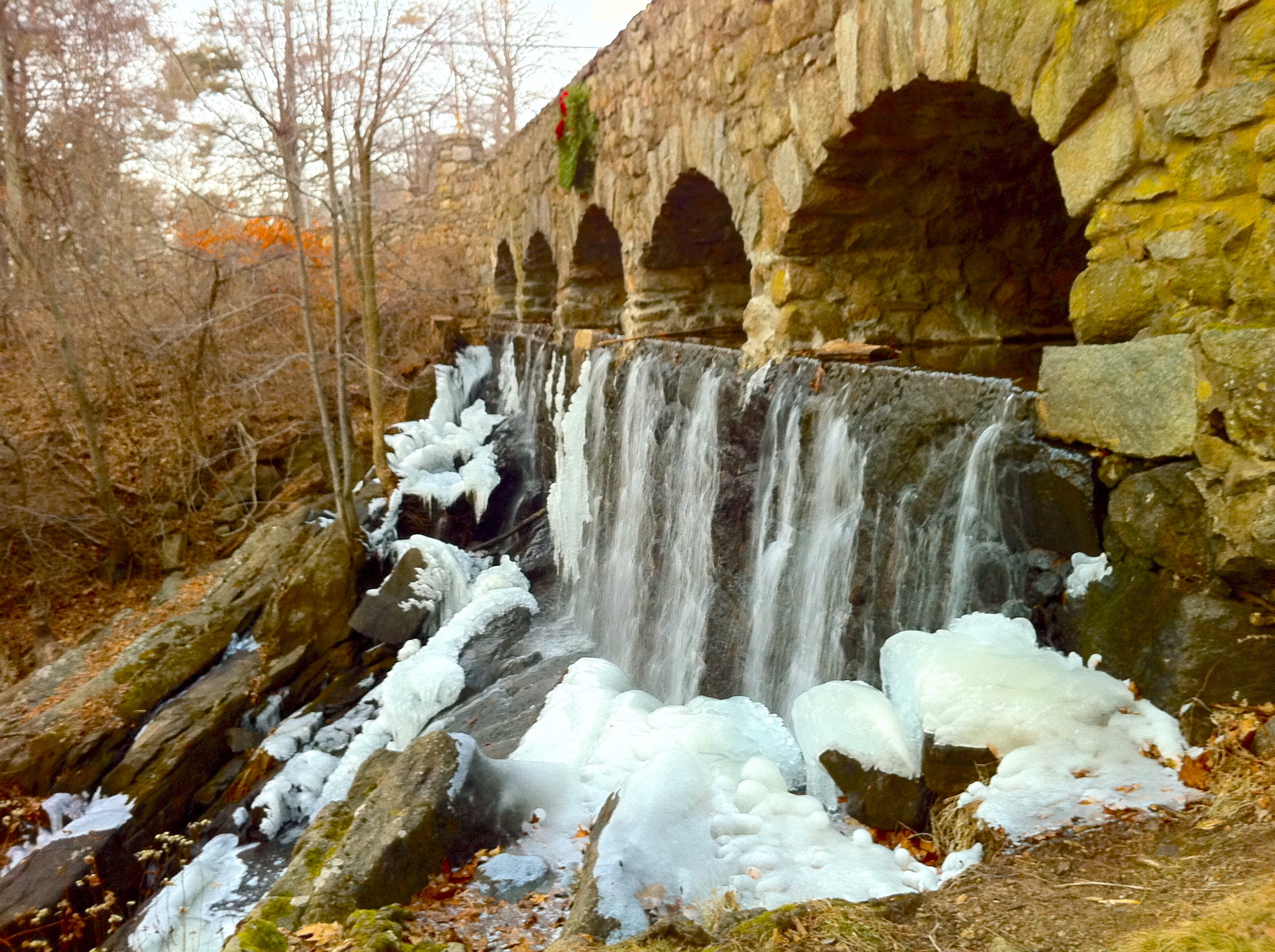
- Frozen waterfalls under the Case Pond Upper Dam in Manchester, Connecticut.
- Location: Manchester and Glastonbury, CT
- Nearest city: Hartford, Connecticut
- Area: 640 acres (2.6 km^{2}) within town of Manchester
- Governing body: Town of Manchester

Located in the southeastern section of Manchester, Connecticut, the Case Mountain Recreational Area encompasses 640 acres (2.6 km^{2}) of combined open space and watershed land stretching from the Glastonbury border north to Case Pond. Some trails lead south across the Glastonbury border to a larger area of land owned by the Town of Manchester to maintain the Buckingham Reservoir and provide drinking water to Manchester. The land around the reservoir is open to recreation. While there is a hill named Case Mountain in this area, locals refer to this entire trail system and forest in Manchester and Glastonbury simply as “Case Mountain.”

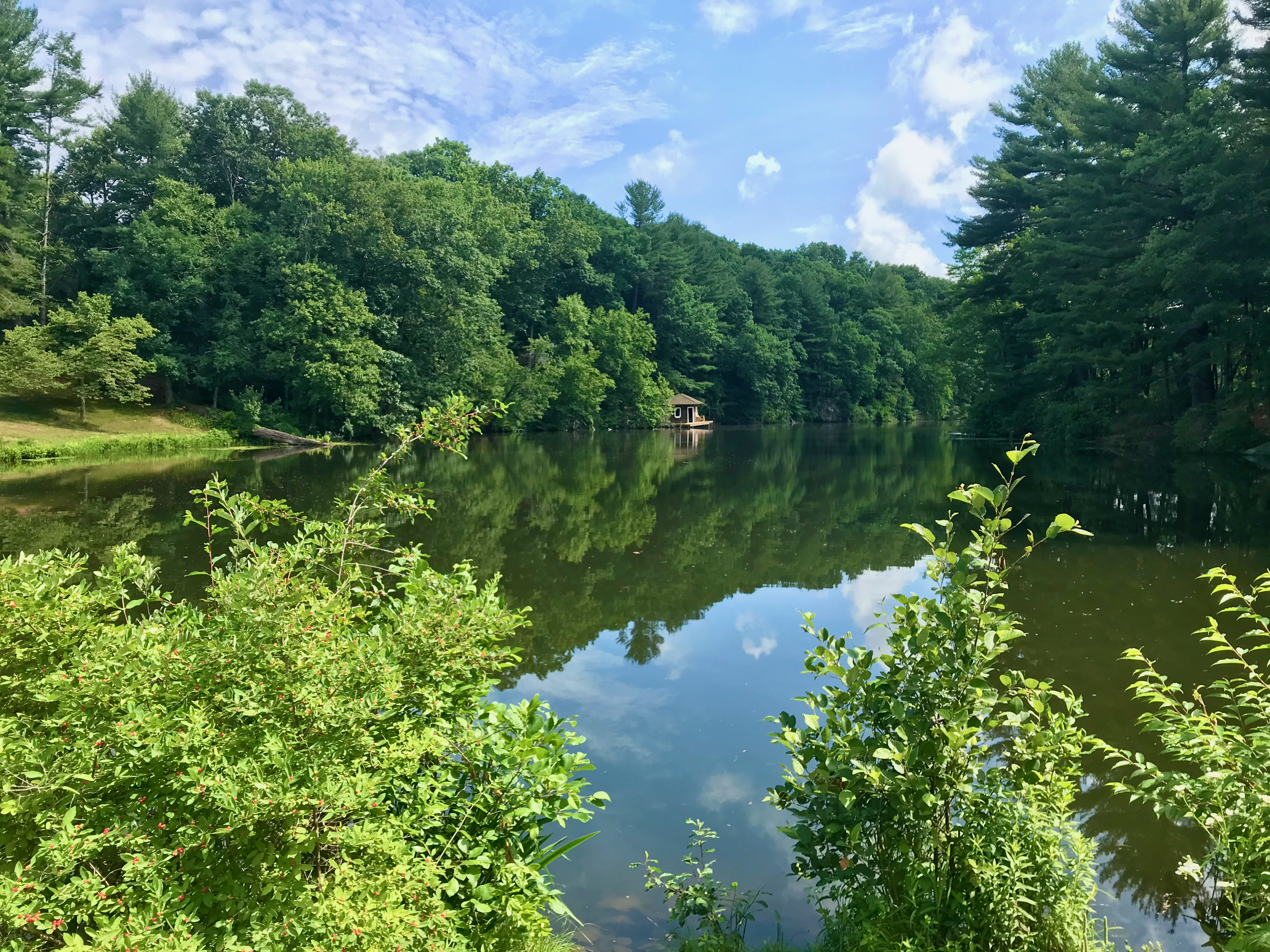
Case Pond in the Case Mountain Recreational Area in the Town of Manchester, Connecticut.

== History ==
The Case family were prominent industrialists in Manchester where they operated a paper mill and water bottling facility. In 1861 Alfred Wells Case and his twin brother Albert Willard Case opened the Case Brothers Inc. paper mill in Highland Park where they produced washed cotton supplied to the Union Army during the Civil War. At the end of the war, the Case brothers began a specialized papermaking operation and soon became a leader in the manufacturing of pressboard, a strong paper product used as album board, shoe board, and binder board. They were true Connecticut Yankees that ran an efficient, innovative, highly skilled operation, and the company continued to flourish as the New England paper industry reached its peak. In 1878 the company won first prize for its pressed paper at the International Paris Exposition, competing with many European paper manufacturers, and achieved further success at the Melbourne Exhibition of 1880. Case Brothers Inc. remained a family business and continued success into the 1960s when it was acquired by Boise Cascade Corporation. The Case family owned a large amount of land in the southeastern section Manchester that is now the Case Mountain Recreational Area. They built a stone bridge across the west end of Case Pond, many stone walls, a chestnut log cabin, and a carriage path that loops from Spring Street to the top of Lookout Mountain and down to Case Pond.

=== Case Mountain Cabin ===
Members of the Case-Dennison family had a log cabin constructed on the property by French-Canadian builders in 1917-1918, for use as a summer home. The cabin was built using American chestnut trees from the property; a unique feature because American chestnuts were decimated by blight in the early 1900s. The cabin was used by the Case-Dennison family until 2005, and was purchased by the town of Manchester in 2006. After being unoccupied for several years, it fell into disrepair and was slated for demolition until a local conservation group leased the cabin from the town and began rehabilitation efforts in 2024.

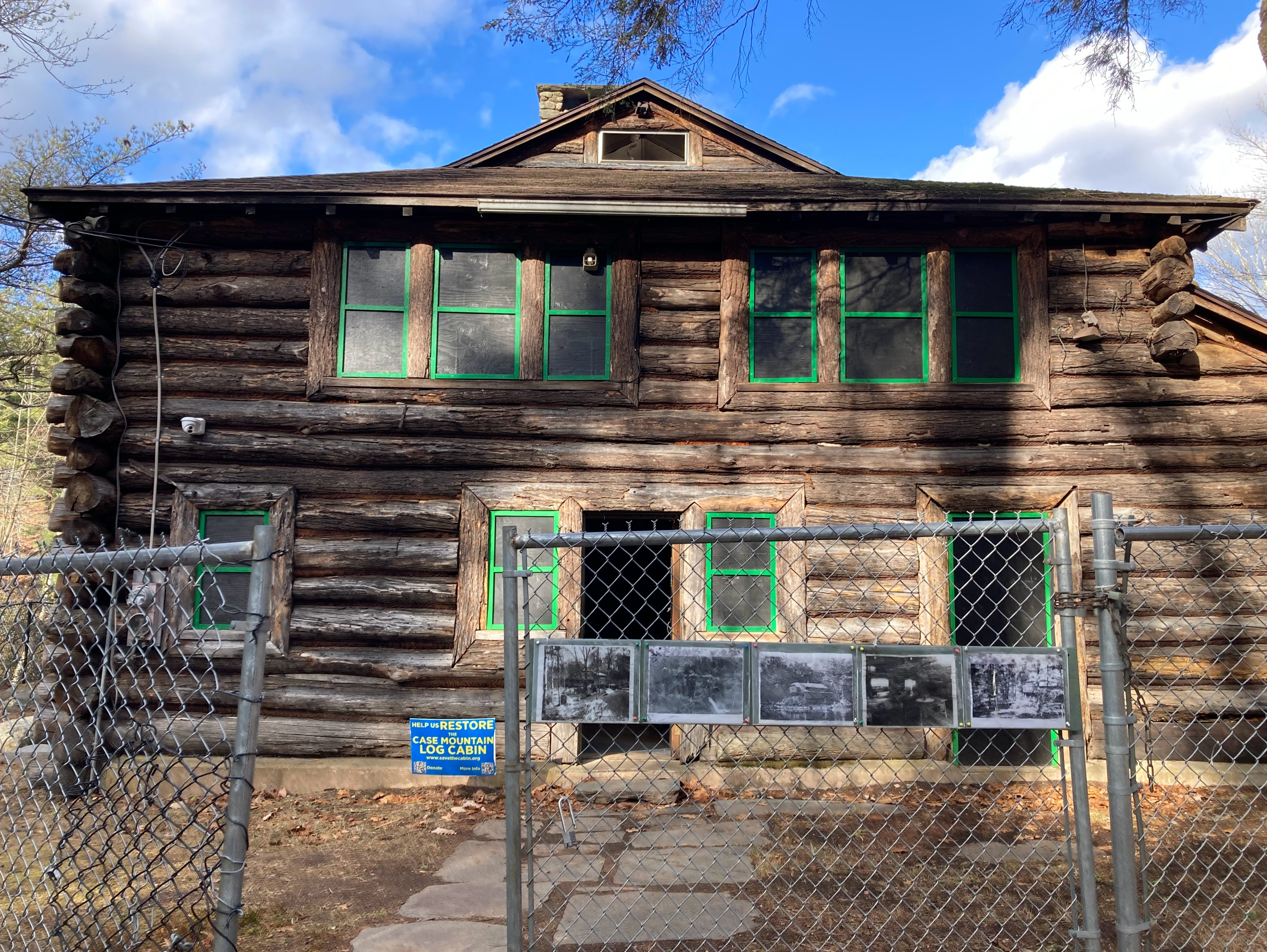
Cabin main entrance (November 2024)

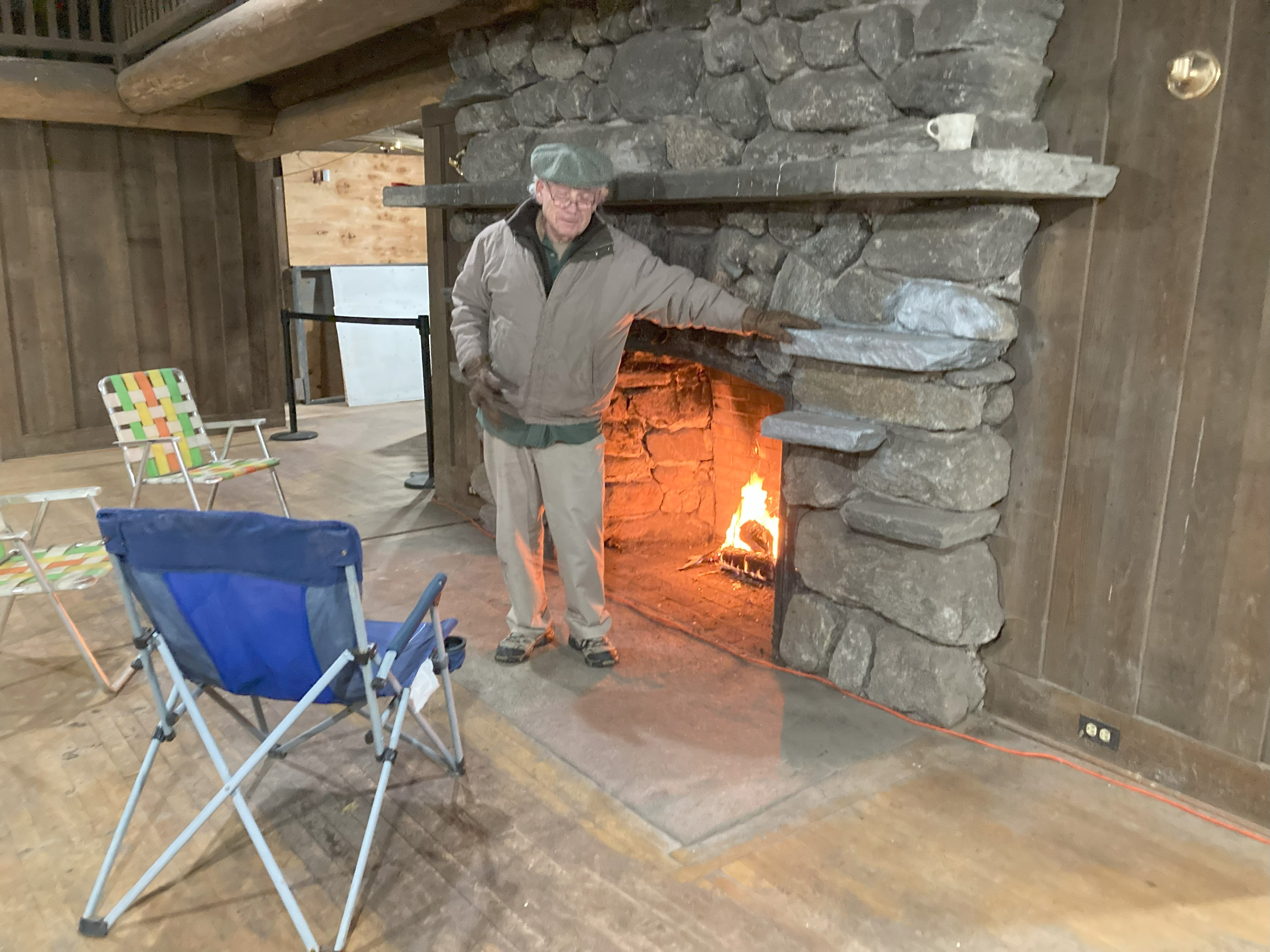
Cabin interior with working fireplace (November 2024)

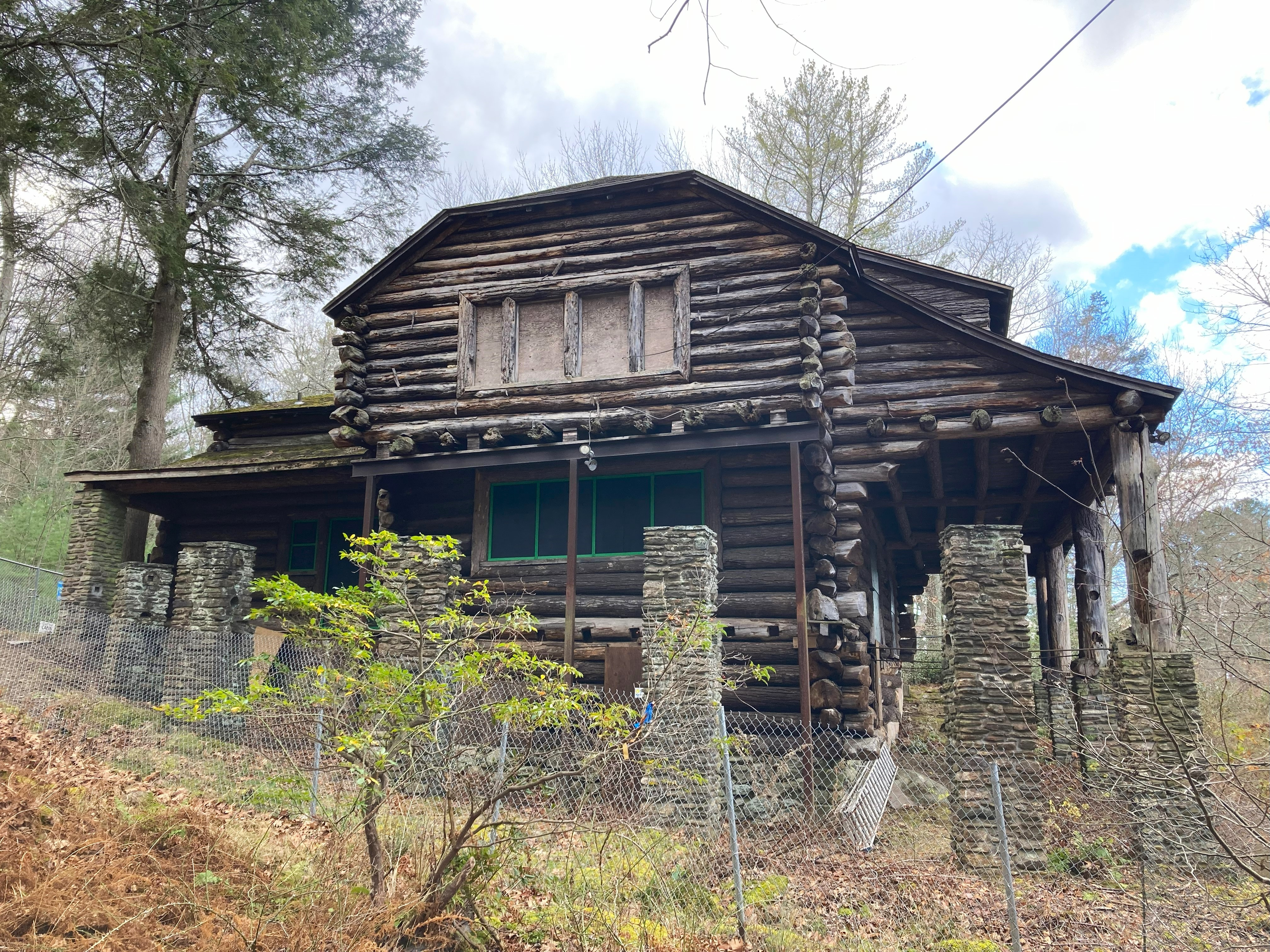
Cabin exterior and porch (November 2024)

== Trails ==
Case Mountain has a vast trail network for hiking and mountain biking, maintained by Manchester Conservation Commission and the Connecticut Forest and Park Association. The terrain is very rocky and hilly, making for somewhat difficult hiking and challenging mountain biking. Bring a trail map and good footwear.

The carriage path, a wide smooth gravel trail with white markings, leads visitors from the Spring Street parking area to the summit of Lookout Mountain (elev. 744 ft) and loops around to Case Pond. Visitors often mistake Lookout Mountain for Case Mountain (elev. 735). The summit of Lookout Mountain has benches and a kiosk and gives visitors a great view of Downtown Manchester, Downtown Hartford, and the hills off to the west.

The Shenipsit Trail is a blue-blazed trail running north–south through the area. Starting in East Hampton and going north to Somers, the Shenipsit trail covers over 40 miles (64 km), about 5 of those miles are within the Case Mountain area. There are two vistas on this section of trail providing views of Hartford, but not nearly as panoramic as the views from the top of Lookout Mountain.

=== Mountain biking ===
Mountain biking is a very popular activity at Case Mountain. Case Mountain was voted the Best Ride in Connecticut in Mountain Bike Magazine by readers. Bikers tend to stick to single-track trails, such as the locally famous "Metavomit" trail. The terrain on these trails is rocky with many steep climbs and descents. Rocks, logs, boulders, and man-made ladder-bridges (to make the trails "bikeable") are often intentionally incorporated into these mountain biking trails. Trail-braiding, when short trails are created that go around an obstacle or technical section or short-cut a sharp corner, the result of beginners riding on advanced trails, is not a large problem on mountain-bike trails at Case Mountain, because the "beginner" trails are unblazed and offer trial use for riders of varying skill levels. The Shenipsit Trail is for pedestrian use only. Connecticut Forest & Park Association (CFPA)

== Geology and ecology ==
The forest in which the Case Mountain trail system is located is mostly second-growth deciduous forest. The forest floor is littered with boulders and rock gardens deposited from glaciers during the last ice age. Along the Shenipsit Trail one can find clusters of chestnut oak, a very distinguishable tree that grows in rocky mountainous terrain in the Eastern US, and is prominent on ridgetops. In Glastonbury land owned by the Town of Manchester around the Buckingham Reservoir are large white pine trees. The Roaring Brook flows through the area creating marshy habitat just upstream of the reservoir and is a wide, fast moving stream further upstream and downstream. There are several vernal pools around Lookout and Case Mountains. These pools like small ponds in the winter and spring when they fill up with snowmelt. When wet, they teem with life, with frogs, toads, salamanders, fairy shrimp, and fingernail clams inhabiting them. By the summer they have usually dried up and appear to simply be small clearings in the woods. There have been black bear sightings at Case Mountain along with other wildlife typical of southern New England.

== Getting there ==
There are four parking areas in Manchester providing access to the trail network. All parking areas have an information kiosk with trail maps.

- Spring Street
- Line Street Trailhead
- Shenipsit Trailhead (Birch Mountain Road)
- Case Pond Trailhead (Birch Mountain Road)

There are also unofficial parking areas in Glastonbury providing access to trails that lead into Manchester.

- Mountain Road (cul-de-sac at the end of street)
- Old Hebron Road (access to the Buckingham Reservoir)
- Birch Mountain Road (underneath the power lines)
