= Shenipsit Trail =

Hiking trail in Connecticut, United States

- Blue blaze on tree near Case Mountain in Manchester marking the Shenipsit trail
- Length: 50 mi (80 km)
- Location: Middlesex / Tolland counties, Connecticut, USA
- Trailheads: Greaves Road, Shenipsit State Forest; Gadpouch Road, Meshomasic State Forest
- Use: Hiking, Mountain Biking
- Highest point: Soapstone Mountain, 41.9590°N 72.4128°W, 1,075 ft (328 m)
- Difficulty: Easy with difficult sections
- Season: All Seasons
- Sights: Great Hill, Lookout Mountain, Soapstone Mountain
- Hazards: deer ticks, poison ivy

The Shenipsit Trail is a Blue-Blazed hiking trail located in Central Connecticut between 3.5 and 7 miles (11 km) east of the Connecticut River. It runs 50 miles (80 km) in a north-south direction. The southern trailhead is on Gadpouch Road in Cobalt, CT on the southern end of the Meshomasic State Forest. The northern trailhead is on Greaves Road past Bald Mountain and the Shenipsit State Forest in Stafford, CT. The trail runs primarily through the Shenipsit and Meshomasic State Forests, and Case Mountain, but also utilizes other public and private land holdings. The Native American name Shenipsit means at the great pool, referring to the Shenipsit Lake, which the trail passes by. The Shenipsit Trail is divided into three sections: South, Central, and North. The Shenipsit Trail is one of the blue-blazed hiking trails managed by the Connecticut Forest and Park Association (CFPA).

== Trail Description ==
The Shenipsit Trail covers 50 miles of rocky, hilly, forested terrain east of the Connecticut River. The trail is used for hiking, running, and mountain-biking, and in the winter snowshoeing, and cross-country skiing. Some sections are very rocky, steep, and technical, limiting use of those sections.

The Shenipsit Trail is marked by blue rectangular blazes. It is part of the blue-blazed trail system maintained by the CFPA. Founded in 1929, the CFPA has created and maintained 825 miles of blue-blazed trails in the state of Connecticut.

== Trail Route ==
The Shenipsit Trail has three sections. The South section goes from Gadpouch Road in Cobalt to Route 2 in Glastonbury. The Central section goes from Route 2 to Risley Pond in Vernon. After a 4-mile gap between the Central and North sections, the North section goes from Grahaber Road in Tolland to Greaves Road in Stafford.

The Shenipsit Trail passes through the following Connecticut towns from south to north: East Hampton, Portland, Glastonbury, Manchester, Bolton, Vernon, Rockville, Tolland, Ellington, Stafford, and Somers.

=== South Section ===
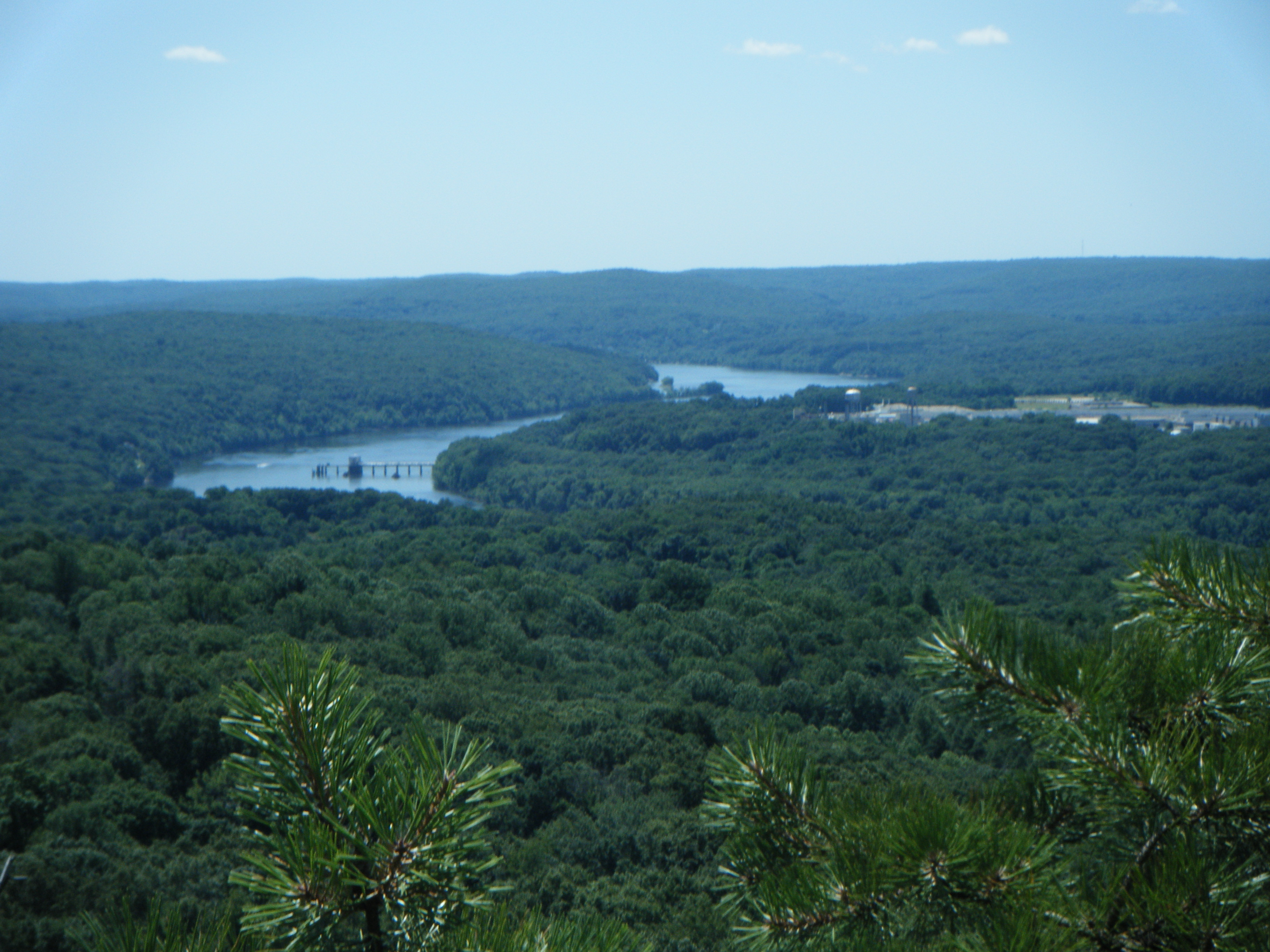
Connecticut River as seen from Great Hill in the Meshomasic State Forest, just off the Shenipsit Trail

The South section of the Shenipsit trail runs from Gadpouch Road in Cobalt to Route 2 in Glastonbury. Starting on Gadpouch Road in Cobalt, CT next to the (former site of the) Meshomasic State Forest Ranger Headquarters, the trail climbs a very steep ridge to the top of Great Hill, a part of the Bald Hill Range. A spur trail takes hikers to a rocky vista with views of the Connecticut River, Middletown, and Great Hill Pond just below. The trail continues north along Great Hill Ridge, crossing Woodchoppers Rd, a dirt road in the state forest. Soon after, the trail crests over Bald Hill at 893 feet, the highest point on the Shenipsit Trail within the Meshomasic State Forest. The trail follows some unmaintained dirt roads and a few single-track trails until reaching Connecticut Route 2 in Glastonbury. Hikers should take caution crossing the four-lane freeway and are recommended to take a connector trail to Dickinson Rd, then Mott Hill Rd, then Toll Gate Rd to go around Route 2.

=== Central Section ===
View from Lookout Mountain, just off the Shenipsit Trail.

The Central Section goes from Route 2 in Glastonbury to Risley Pond in Vernon. The Central Section of the trail starts just north of Route 2, and can be reached from Toll Gate Road in Glastonbury. The trail stretches about 4.9 miles from Route 2 to Hebron Avenue (Route 94) in Glastonbury. The trail crosses Hebron Ave at Birch Mountain Road.

The trail follows Birch Mountain Road for 0.3 mile before turning left into the woods and once again becomes a single track trail. The trail crosses through many stone walls and enters the Case Mountain trail system. After crossing the power lines, the trail becomes very rocky and a section of it is referred to by mountain-bikers as “Slick-Rock”. Crossing Coop-Sawmill Road, a dirt road, the trail rolls up and down small steep hills until it reaches the top of Case Mountain in Manchester. Taking a left on the Lookout Mountain trail for 600 feet takes you to the top of Lookout Mountain where there are benches, information kiosks, and a vista with a view of Hartford and the Connecticut River Valley. The trail continues along a ridge past the intersection with the Lookout Mountain Trail, crosses Birch Mountain Rd in Manchester, then comes out on a residential street.

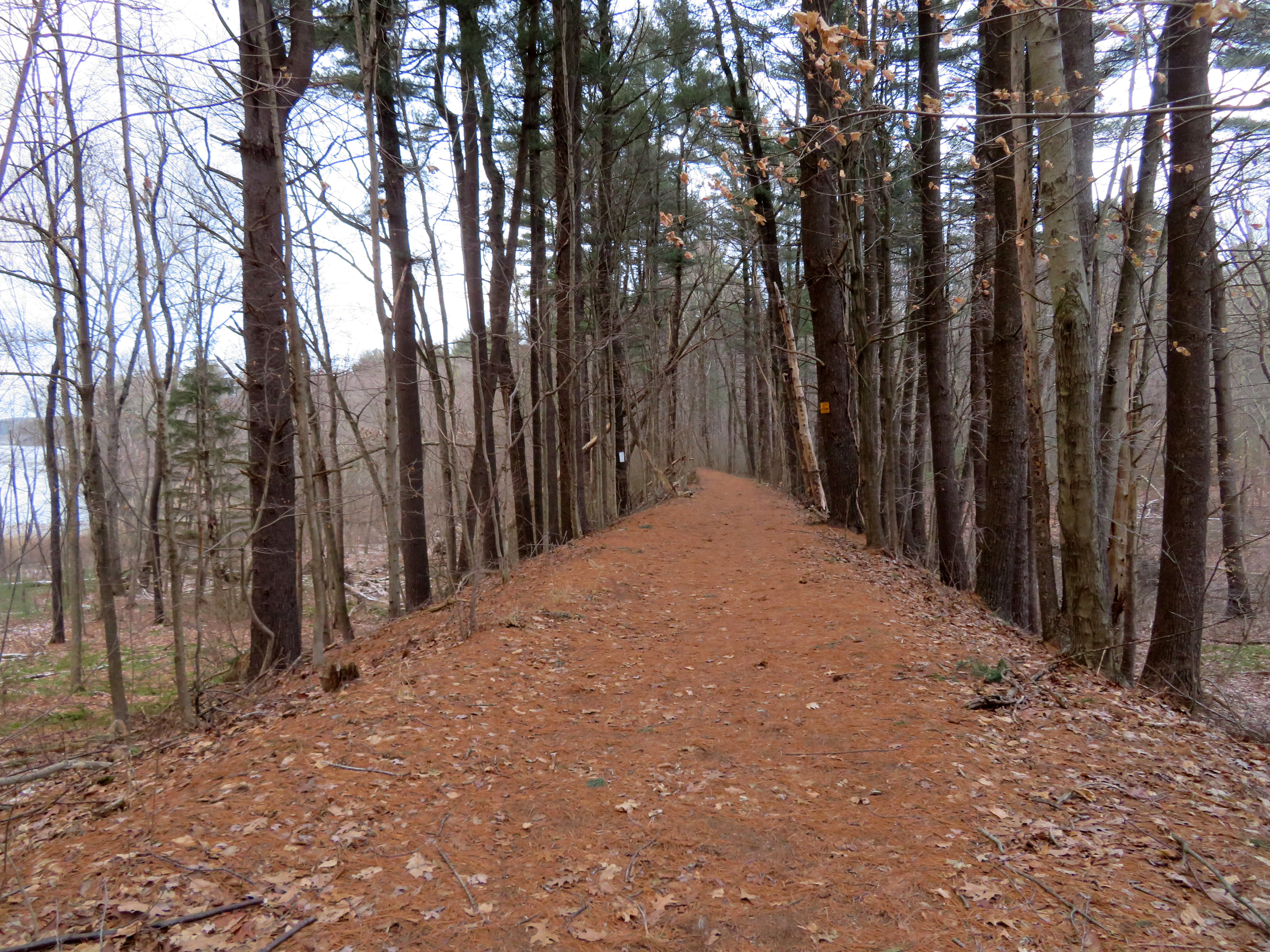
The trail along Shenipsit Lake in Rockville

After following some trails, gas-line easements, and roads, the trail picks up again at an abandoned drive-in theater on US Route 6 near Bolton Notch State Park. The trail goes through Bolton Notch State Park for about a mile, then shares its pathway with the Hop River Bike Path for about two miles between Bolton Notch and Valley Falls Park. The trail crosses Bolton Road, and drops into the Belding Wildlife Management Area then the Tankerhoosen Wildlife Management Area, crossing the Tankerhoosen River at the bottom of the mill pond. It then winds north between West Walker Reservoir and Highway 84, before ending at the public area on Reservoir Road at East Walker Reservoir, where there are picnic tables and fishing areas. From there, the trail follows roads for another four miles. Paved roads lead under the Route 31 underpass of Hwy 84 (exit 67) and down Route 30, then takes a turn through the Tolland County Agricultural Center, before making its way back to Route 30. The trail turns down Kingsbury Road and briefly down Route 74 before following a wooded trail (the former Stafford Springs Street Railway right-of-way) along Lake Shenipsit. At the northeast corner of the lake, the trail meets with Shenipsit Lake Road. The trail leaves public roads on Grahaber Rd in Tolland, a half mile west of the intersection of Shenipsit Lake Road and Grahaber Road/Browns Bridge Road, which is the southern end of the North section.

=== North Section ===
The North Section of the Shenipsit trail starts at Grahaber Rd in Tolland. Continuing through the Shenipsit State Forest, the trail climbs 1,075-foot Soapstone Mountain. On top of the mountain is a lookout tower that was built in the 1970s to replace a fire tower that had been built by the Civilian Conservation Corps. The tower is just tall enough to see over the tree line, but from there one can see the Connecticut River Valley, Mount Greylock in the Berkshires of Massachusetts, and Mount Monadnock in New Hampshire. Continuing down the mountain, the trail comes to an end on Greaves Road in Stafford.

Historically, this trail continued north beyond Bald Mountain, Perkins Mountain, and Rattlesnake Mountain in Somers and ended in the town of Hampden, Massachusetts. This portion of the trail was discontinued in the 1980s. In 2014, the trail was extended again from its end in Somers by 2.5 miles over Bald Mountain to Stafford.

== See also ==
- Blue-Blazed Trails
