= East Hampton, Connecticut =

- Town
- Town of East Hampton
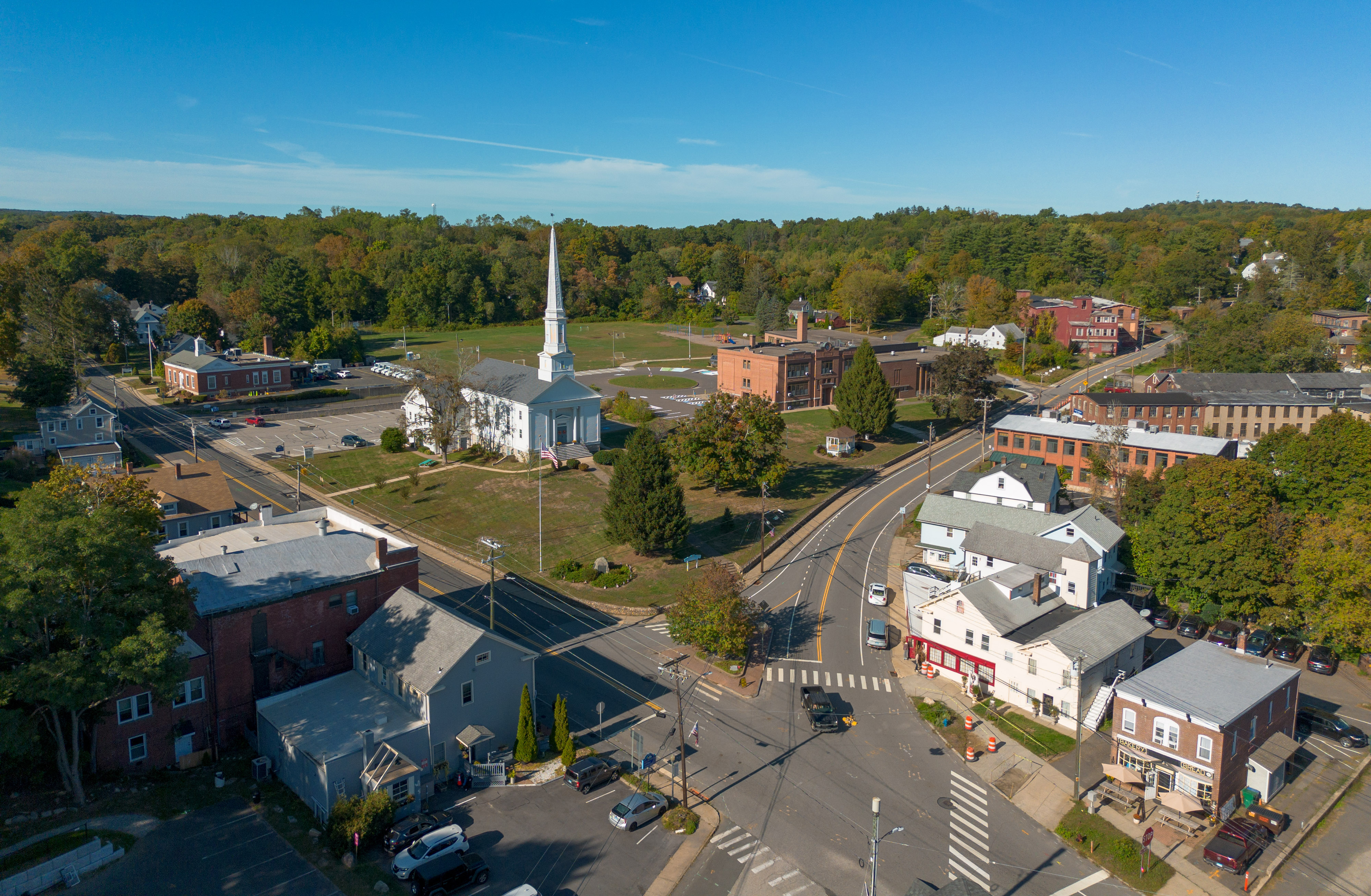
- East Hampton in 2025

- Flag Seal
- Nickname: Belltown, USA
- Interactive map of East Hampton, Connecticut
- Coordinates: 41°34′N 72°30′W
- Country: United States
- U.S. state: Connecticut
- County: Middlesex
- Region: Lower CT River Valley
- Incorporated: 1767

Government
  - Type: Council-manager
  - Council: Dean Markham (D), Chair; Jack Solomon (D), Vice-Chair; Karen Wanat (D); Richard Knotek (D); Tim Feegel (R); Ted Hintz, Jr. (R); Joelyn Leon (D)
  - Town Manager: David E. Cox

Area
  - Total: 36.8 sq mi (95.3 km^{2})
  - Land: 35.6 sq mi (92.2 km^{2})
  - Water: 1.2 sq mi (3.2 km^{2})
- Elevation: 417 ft (127 m)

Population (2020)
  - Total: 12,717
  - Density: 357/sq mi (137.9/km^{2})
- Time zone: UTC-5 (Eastern)
  - Summer (DST): UTC-4 (Eastern)
- ZIP code: 06424, 06414, 06456
- Area codes: 860/959
- FIPS code: 09-22490
- GNIS feature ID: 0213423
- Website: www.easthamptonct.gov

East Hampton is a town in Middlesex County, Connecticut, United States. The town is part of the Lower Connecticut River Valley Planning Region. The population was 12,717 at the 2020 census. The town center village is listed as a census-designated place (CDP). East Hampton includes the communities of Cobalt, Middle Haddam, and Lake Pocotopaug.

The southern trailhead of the Shenipsit Trail is in Cobalt, and the Airline State Park (a rail trail) has its southern trailhead in East Hampton, at Main Street in the Village Center. The 884-acre (358 ha) Hurd State Park, Meshomasic State Forest, and Salmon River State Forest are located in town. Comstock's Bridge, more commonly known as the Comstock Covered Bridge and the only remaining covered bridge in eastern Connecticut, spans the Salmon River near Route 16 in East Hampton.

The Chatham Historical Society Museum and the Joseph N. Goff House Museum and Cultural Center are located in the town.

== History ==
The first European-derived settlers of the area arrived in 1739 by sea from Eastham, Massachusetts. They traveled up the Connecticut River to Middle Haddam parish between the two adjacent towns of Middletown and Haddam. Led by Isaac Smith, some of these settlers went on to the hills near Lake Pocotopaug, the present-day location of East Hampton. In 1746, the settlers named their community Easthampton parish after their former home of Eastham. In 1767, the community was separated from Middletown incorporated by the Connecticut General Assembly as the township of Chatham, after Chatham, Medway due to the important shipbuilding industries that both places had in common. An iron forge at the outlet of Lake Pocotopaug was one of the earliest in Connecticut. The forge supplied the local needs and the shipbuilding industry on the banks of the Connecticut River. Shipbuilding up the Connecticut River was given a boost during the War of 1812 when the British raided a town at the mouth of the Connecticut River. The knowledge gained in forging and casting iron was later used for creating other items including waffle irons. Bell making continued to grow during the 1800s with firms utilizing the water power of the Pocotopaug Stream. After the Civil War numerous coffin trimming concerns lined the stream. Some firms changed focus over time such as the Watrous Mfg. Co. which started making just bells, later making coffin trimmings, and still later making bell toys.

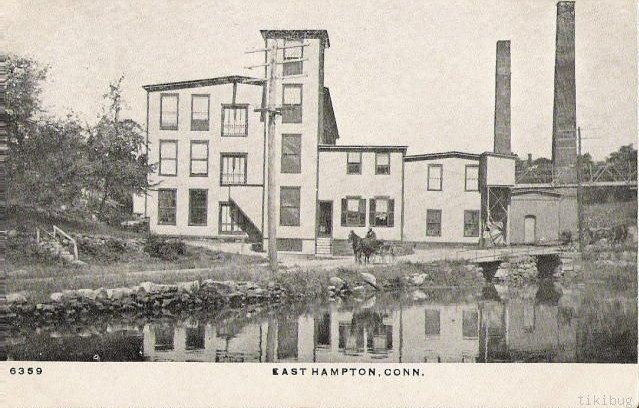
Summit Thread Company, 1906

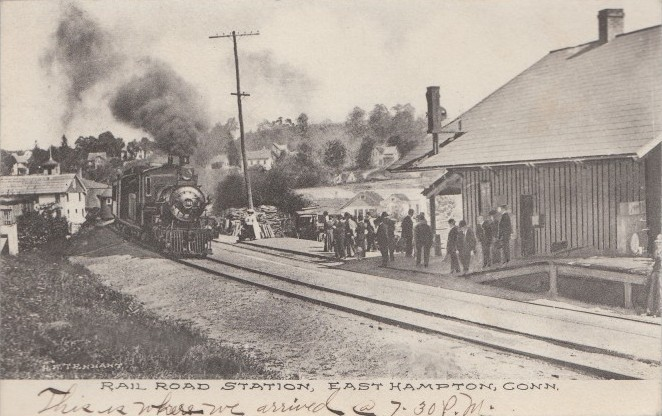
Railroad station, c. 1907

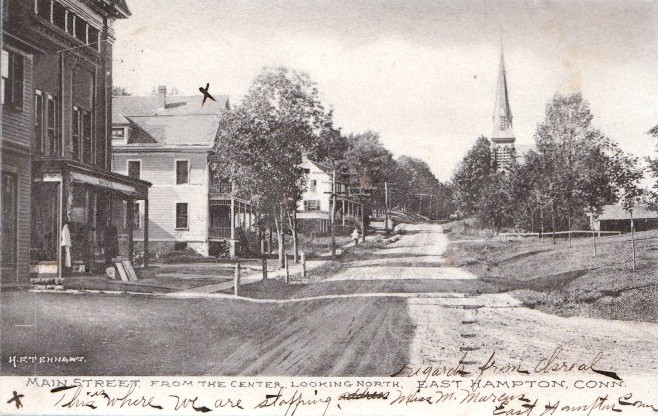
Main Street, c. 1907

In the 19th century, East Hampton became the center of the manufacturing of bells. So many bells were made in East Hampton that the town was given the name Belltown. The first factory was constructed in 1808 by William Barton on Bevin Hill later renamed Barton Hill. During the 1800s, thirty firms were said to have built and run shops, or small factories producing bell and bell related products. The most prominent names include William Barton and the numerous Barton companies of his sons, Bevin Brothers Manufacturing Company, (Note: The historic 1880s Bevin factory located off Bevin Boulevard was destroyed by fire in 2012. As of 2017, the company operates out of rented space on Watrous Street, in a building once occupied by the woodworking shop of Gong Bell, using bell molds salvaged from the fire and refurbished presses.) Starr Bros. Bell Co., The N. N. Hill Brass Co., The East Hampton Bell Co., Watrous Mfg. Co., Veazey and White, and Gong Bell.

The bell companies that dominated the economy of East Hampton by making metal bells continued to flourish until horses and buggy transportation (and the bells used to adorn their harnesses) gave way to automobiles. The Great Depression also negatively impacted manufacturing in the area. Two firms continued to flourish into the 1950s by changing from making predominantly metal bells with bell toys being a minor part of their production in the 1800s, to primarily making bell toys. These two firms N. N. Hill Brass Co. and Gong Bell Mfg. Co., survived till the 1960s. The last remaining original operating bell shop, operated by Bevin Brothers, was razed by fire on May 27, 2012, but continues in full operation in a new East Hampton location; some other structures shut down while still structurally intact but remained unavailable for adaptive re-use, due to the presence of toxic substances at levels that resist remediation. Other mills, which were remediated or did not contain toxics, have been converted into offices, stores, and other small businesses.

In 1841, the East Middletown parish, which had been a part of Chatham, separated and became a new township called Conway (later renamed to Portland).

Chatham was renamed to East Hampton in 1915, which had long been a second name for the township. The name "East Hampton", however, is confusing, since the town is, in fact, approximately 30 miles (48 km) southwest of Hampton, Connecticut. In addition, there is often confusion between East Hampton and the contiguous town of East Haddam, which was named in 1734.

Capt. Jesse Hurd was a master ship builder in Middle Haddam after the Revolutionary War until his death in 1839. Interest in ship building in Middle Haddam dwindled thereafter. Captain Hurd was also the owner and creator of the New York Screw Dock Company, a "dry dock" facility for ship repairs.

== Geography ==
According to the United States Census Bureau, the town has a total area of 36.8 square miles (95 km^{2}), of which 35.6 square miles (92 km^{2}) is land and 1.2 square miles (3.1 km^{2}) (3.37%) is water, due chiefly to Lake Pocotopaug, which was formerly inhabited by Native American tribes. The town center CDP has a total area of 2.6 square miles (6.7 km^{2}), of which 2.5 square miles (6.5 km^{2}) is land and 0.04 square miles (0.10 km^{2}) (0.78%) is water.

== Demographics ==
Historical population
Census	Pop.	Note	%±
1790	3,230		—
1800	3,295		2.0%
1810	3,258		−1.1%
1820	3,159		−3.0%
1830	3,646		15.4%
1840	3,413		−6.4%
1850	1,525		−55.3%
1860	1,766		15.8%
1870	2,771		56.9%
1880	1,967		−29.0%
1890	1,949		−0.9%
1900	2,271		16.5%
1910	2,390		5.2%
1920	2,394		0.2%
1930	2,616		9.3%
1940	2,955		13.0%
1950	4,000		35.4%
1960	5,403		35.1%
1970	7,078		31.0%
1980	8,572		21.1%
1990	10,428		21.7%
2000	13,352		28.0%
2010	12,959		−2.9%
2020	12,717		−1.9%
U.S. Decennial Census

At the 2000 census there were 13,352 people, 4,126 households, and 3,003 families living in the town. The population density was 375.2 inhabitants per square mile (144.9/km^{2}). There were 4,412 housing units at an average density of 124.0 per square mile (47.9/km^{2}). The racial makeup of the town was 93.36% White, 2.04% Black or African American, 0.19% Native American, 2.39% Asian, 0.05% Pacific Islander, 0.44% from other races, and 1.51% from two or more races. Hispanic or Latino of any race were 1.69%.

Of the 4,126 households 36.6% had children under the age of 18 living with them, 60.7% were married couples living together, 8.5% had a female householder with no husband present, and 27.2% were non-families. 20.5% of households were one person and 5.5% were one person aged 65 or older. The average household size was 2.63 and the average family size was 3.07.

The age distribution was 21.4% under the age of 18, 22.4% from 18 to 24, 27.0% from 25 to 44, 21.3% from 45 to 64, and 7.9% 65 or older. The median age was 32 years. For every 100 females, there were 99.0 males. For every 100 females age 18 and over, there were 96.8 males.

The median household income was $66,326 and the median family income was $74,409. Males had a median income of $50,157 versus $35,867 for females. The per capita income for the town was $22,769. About 2.2% of families and 3.7% of the population were below the poverty line, including 2.7% of those under age 18 and 8.0% of those age 65 or over.

=== Town center ===
At the 2000 census there were 2,254 people, 821 households, and 596 families living in the East Hampton CDP. The population density was 883.0 inhabitants per square mile (340.9/km^{2}). There were 858 housing units at an average density of 336.1 per square mile (129.8/km^{2}). The racial makeup of the CDP was 97.96% White, 0.80% Black or African American, 0.13% Native American, 0.58% Asian, 0.04% from other races, and 0.49% from two or more races. Hispanic or Latino of any race were 0.67%.

Of the 821 households 37.1% had children under the age of 18 living with them, 58.6% were married couples living together, 9.9% had a female householder with no husband present, and 27.3% were non-families. 20.0% of households were one person and 5.2% were one person aged 65 or older. The average household size was 2.70 and the average family size was 3.15.

The age distribution was 27.3% under the age of 18, 6.0% from 18 to 24, 33.4% from 25 to 44, 23.3% from 45 to 64, and 9.9% 65 or older. The median age was 37 years. For every 100 females, there were 96.9 males. For every 100 females age 18 and over, there were 93.2 males.

The median household income was $53,464 and the median family income was $64,150. Males had a median income of $50,727 versus $31,181 for females. The per capita income for the CDP was $25,207. About 1.2% of families and 4.1% of the population were below the poverty line, including 2.7% of those under age 18 and 2.8% of those age 65 or over.

== Historic sites ==
Historic sites in East Hampton include the following three sites listed on the National Register of Historic Places:

- Comstock's Bridge, Southeast of East Hampton off CT 16
- Middle Haddam Historic District, Moodus and Long Hill Roads
- Middle Haddam School, Schoolhouse Lane
- Rapallo Viaduct, Flat Brook and former Air Line railroad right-of-way

== Notable people ==
- Scott Wasserman, musician, composer, orchestrator, musical director, and electronic music programmer and two-time Grammy award winner
- Erin Brady, Miss Connecticut USA 2013 and Miss USA 2013
- Eleanor Hoyt Brainerd, novelist, lived at "Faraway Farm" near East Hampton in the early 20th century
- Caroline Brown Buell (1843–1927), activist
- Elizabeth Eunice Marcy (1821–1911), author, activist, and social reformer
- Mark Mulcahy, front-man for the New Haven-based band Miracle Legion and solo recording artist
- William A. O'Neill (1930–2007), Governor of Connecticut, 1980–1991, native and lifelong resident of East Hampton
- Alfred Henry Wilcox (1823–1883), sea captain, steamboat and steamship entrepreneur, banker
- Thomas Tallman (1815–1872), minister and politician
