= Middle Haddam Historic District =

Historic district in Connecticut, United States

- U.S. National Register of Historic Places
- U.S. Historic district
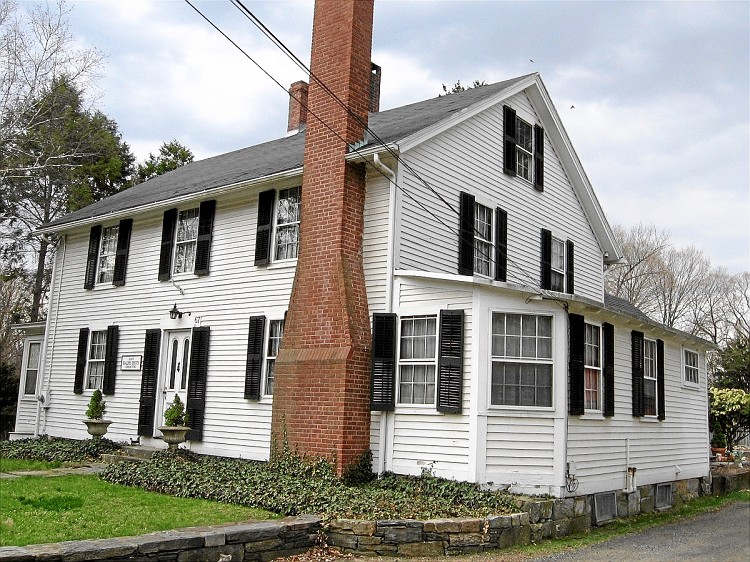
- The Ralph Smith House

- Location within Connecticut Location within the United States
- Location: Moodus and Long Hill Roads, East Hampton, Connecticut
- Coordinates: 41°33′11″N 72°33′6″W
- Area: 110 acres (45 ha)
- Built: 1730
- Architectural style: Mid 19th Century Revival, Federal, Colonial
- NRHP reference No.: 84001112
- Added to NRHP: February 3, 1984

The Middle Haddam Historic District is a historic district in the town of East Hampton, Connecticut, United States. It encompasses the village center of Middle Haddam, a riverfront community founded in the 17th century on the east bank of the Connecticut River. It was an important port on the river between about 1730 and 1880. Its layout and architecture are reflective of this history, and by the geographic constraints of the local terrain. The district was listed on the National Register of Historic Places in 1984.

== Description and history ==
Middle Haddam was settled in the 17th century as part of Middletown, and was incorporated as part of East Hampton in 1767. From an early date it was a shipbuilding community, with a sawmill on Mill Brook, which runs through the village. By the early 18th century, a ferry service was operating across the Connecticut River. By the time of the American Revolution, it was a small but significant commercial center for a large agricultural area to the east, and became the locus of a road network serving those areas. It also acted as a shipment point for trade with the West Indies and the North American coast, and was the site of shipyards building ocean-going vessels.

The village and historic district are shaped by the local topography. The river forms the boundary to the west, and the inland boundaries are generally the result of steep slopes along the river bank or of the streams that pass through the area. The village's northern boundary is distinguished by a transition to later industrial development of Cobalt village, and to the south by a wooded open space and a more widely spaced development pattern. The district has 58 historically significant primary buildings, most of which were built before 1835, giving the village a distinctly Federal style. Its oldest buildings date to 1732. There is only one example of Queen Anne Victorian architecture, built as a summer residence near the town landing.

Among others, the Princeton and Yale Divinity School-educated Second Great Awakening evangelist James Brainerd Taylor (1801–1829) was born in Middle Haddam's historic district. As a boy, Taylor attended the town's still-standing Christ Episcopal Church (est. 1786).

== See also ==
- National Register of Historic Places listings in Middlesex County, Connecticut
