= Shenipsit State Forest =

Forest in Connecticut, United States

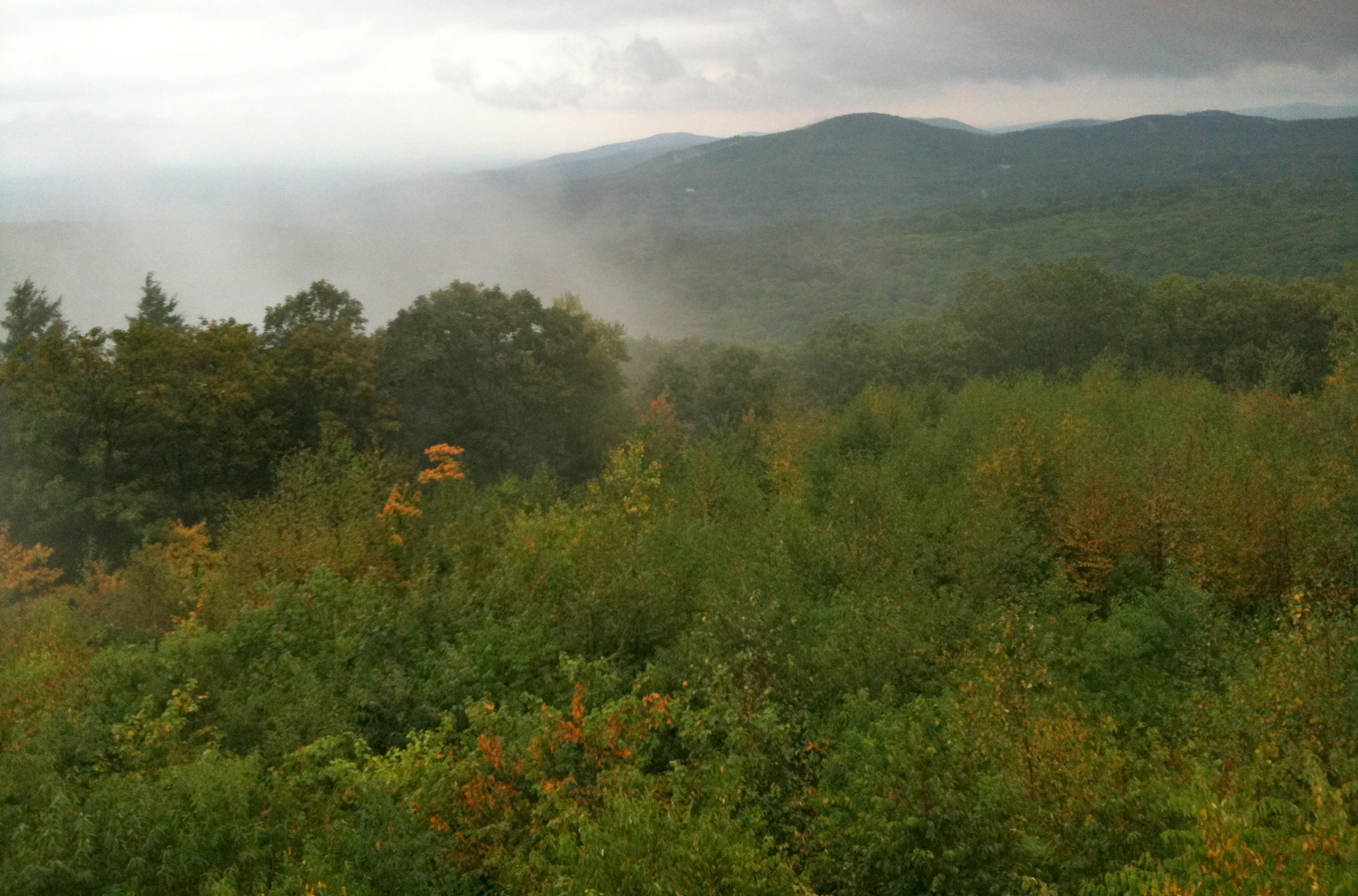
- View from Soapstone Mountain summit lookout tower in Connecticut's Shenipsit State Forest.

- Location within Connecticut Location within the United States
- Location: Somers, Ellington, and Stafford, Connecticut, United States
- Coordinates: 41°58′32″N 72°23′12″W
- Area: 6,962 acres (2,817 ha)
- Elevation: 886 ft (270 m)
- Established: 1927
- Administrator: Connecticut Department of Energy and Environmental Protection
- Website: Official website

Shenipsit State Forest is a state forest located in northeastern Connecticut with 11 parcels scattered between the towns of Somers, Ellington, and Stafford. The forest's headquarters is home to the Civilian Conservation Corps Museum, which houses memorabilia from CCC camps throughout the eastern United States. The forest is managed for forestry products and offers various recreational pursuits.

== Geography ==
The forest is located mainly within the Eastern New England Uplift and contains tracts along the eastern edge of the Connecticut River Valley. The highest point wholly within the state forest is Soapstone Mountain at 1,075 feet (328 m), but the Town of Somers owns adjacent land that includes the 1,121 feet (342 m) summit of Bald Mountain, the highest point along the eastern edge of Connecticut River Valley in Connecticut. The terrain rises up to 800 feet (240 m) from the surrounding Connecticut River Valley, though most mountains and hills rise 300–500 feet (91–152 m) from the surrounding terrain elsewhere in the forest. The forest floor is scattered with boulders and large rocks from the last ice age. Soapstone Mountain used to be the site of a soapstone quarry during the Colonial era.

== Recreation opportunities ==
The Shenipsit Trail, which runs 40 miles (64 km) from East Hampton to Somers, passes through the Shenipsit State Forest and passes over the summit of Soapstone Mountain. The summit has the only lookout tower in northeastern Connecticut. The original fire tower was removed in 1971. Various forest trails can be used for hiking, mountain biking, equestrian travel, and cross-country skiing.
