= Meshomasic State Forest =

Protected area in Connecticut

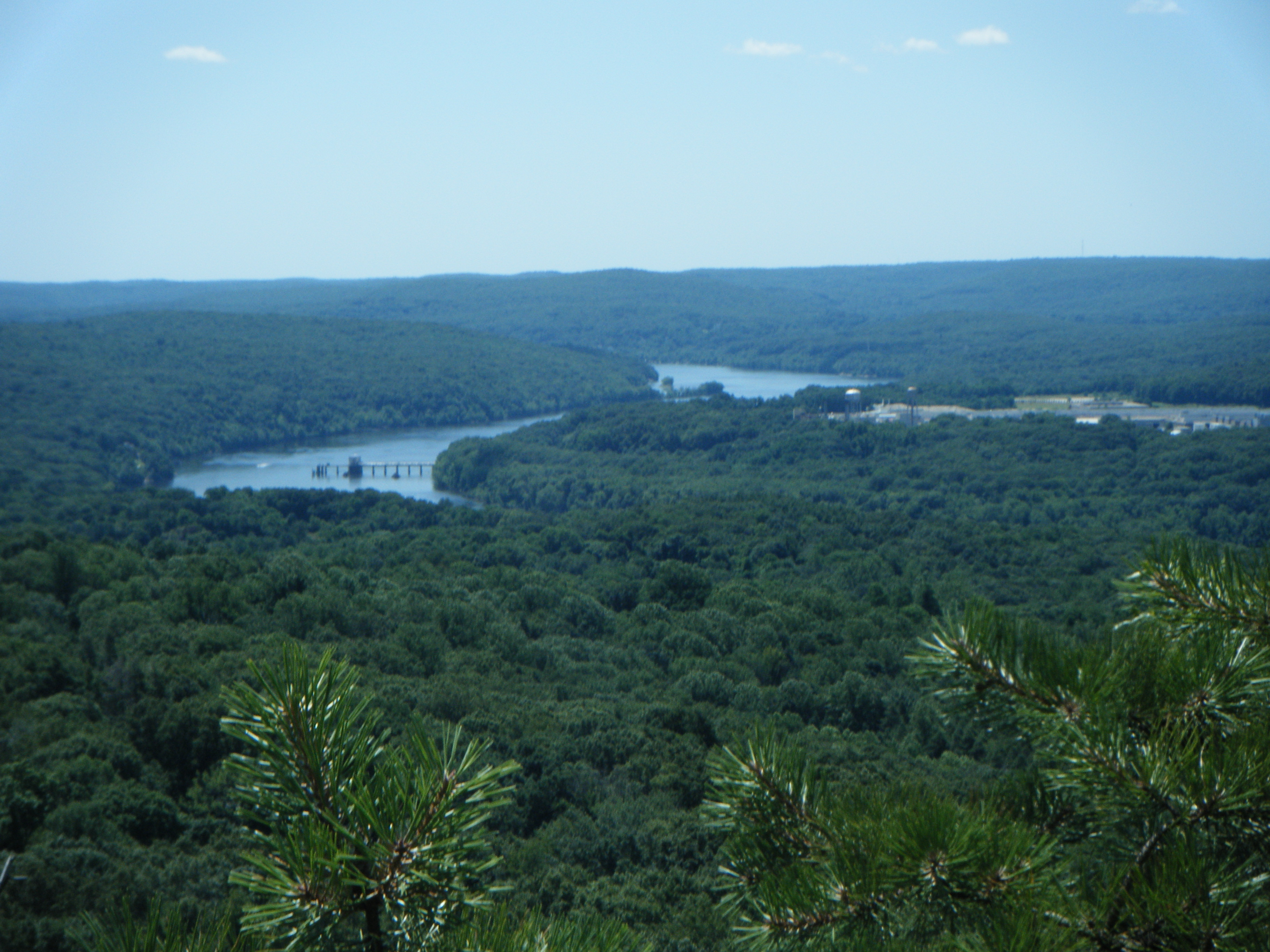
- Connecticut River as seen from Great Hill in the Meshomasic State Forest

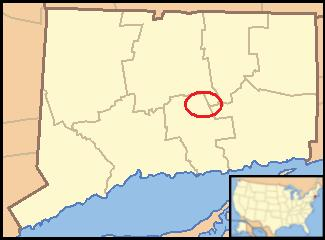
- Forest's location in the state of Connecticut
- Location: Connecticut, USA
- Nearest city: Middletown
- Coordinates: 41.63°N 72.55°W
- Area: 9,000 acres (36 km^{2})
- Established: 1903
- Governing body: Connecticut Department of Energy and Environmental Protection

The Meshomasic State Forest is located in East Hampton, Portland, and Marlborough, Connecticut, with smaller sections located in Glastonbury and Hebron. It is popular for mountain biking, hiking, and hunting. The Rangers Headquarters were located on Gadpouch Road in East Hampton.

== History ==
Meshomasic State Forest began as 70 acres (280,000 m^{2}), acquired for $105.00 in 1903. It was the first State Forest in Connecticut, and the second in the country (Pennsylvania had the first). The forest was originally purchased to provide private landowners with examples of good Forest management practices. During the Great Depression two Civilian Conservation Corps (CCC) camps were located on the forest. Connecticut Route 2, connecting Hartford and Norwich, was built in the 1950s and 1960s and runs through the state forest from Exit 10 to Exit 12.

== Ecology and geology ==
The state forest's second-growth forest is typical of the Northeastern coastal forests ecoregion. The forest is a mix of deciduous trees and white pine. One stand of white pine, referred to as the “big pines”, contains pines over 100 years old.

The forest floor is scattered with boulders and large rocks from the last ice age, and the topography of the region is mostly shaped from glaciers from the last ice age. Cobalt, quartzite, and feldspar are abundant in the state forest, along with gold discovered by geologists at the University of Connecticut in the 1980s, which was found to be unexploitable. The highest point in the Meshomasic State Forest is Meshomasic Mountain at 916 feet (279 m) above sea-level. There are several other hills reaching 800 and 900 feet (270 m). Great Hill, which overlooks Great Hill Pond and the Connecticut River, is part of the Bald Hill Range which runs through the state forest. Kongscut Mountain, known locally as Rattlesnake Mountain, is located in between Goodale Hill Road and Ash Swamp Road on a small section of Meshomasic State Forest land in East Glastonbury.

The rocky forested terrain of the Meshomasic State Forest is home to the largest population of timber rattlesnakes in Connecticut. The timber rattlesnake is an endangered species in Connecticut and it is illegal to kill, harass, or collect. Bites are extremely rare in Connecticut and every bite in the Meshomasic State Forest has been treated in time.

== Forest management ==
The Meshomasic State forest was originally purchased to provide private landowners with examples of good forest management. The current management goals for the forest include maintaining a quality water supply for the Portland town reservoir (located within the state forest), protecting timber rattlesnake habitats, and keeping the forest as a showplace for proper timber management.

Currently, about 75 acres (300,000 m^{2}) per year are harvested. This is a sustainable rate of harvest that also increases biodiversity in the forest and makes the forest more resistant to such disasters as uncontrolled wildfire and destructive insect outbreaks. The “big pines” are left alone and occasionally maintained to give the appearance of a virgin forest.

In the late 19th century and again in the 1940s two quarries in the Meshomasic State Forest were quarried for feldspar and mica. The quarries are still open to the public and rock collectors to explore.

From the early 1950s to 1970s Nike Missile Site HA-36 was located off of North Mulford Road in the Meshomasic State Forest. It was one of over 300 missile-defense sites around major cities during the Cold War. Nike Ajax anti-aircraft missiles were located at HA-36 to protect Hartford's aircraft industry from Soviet bombers.

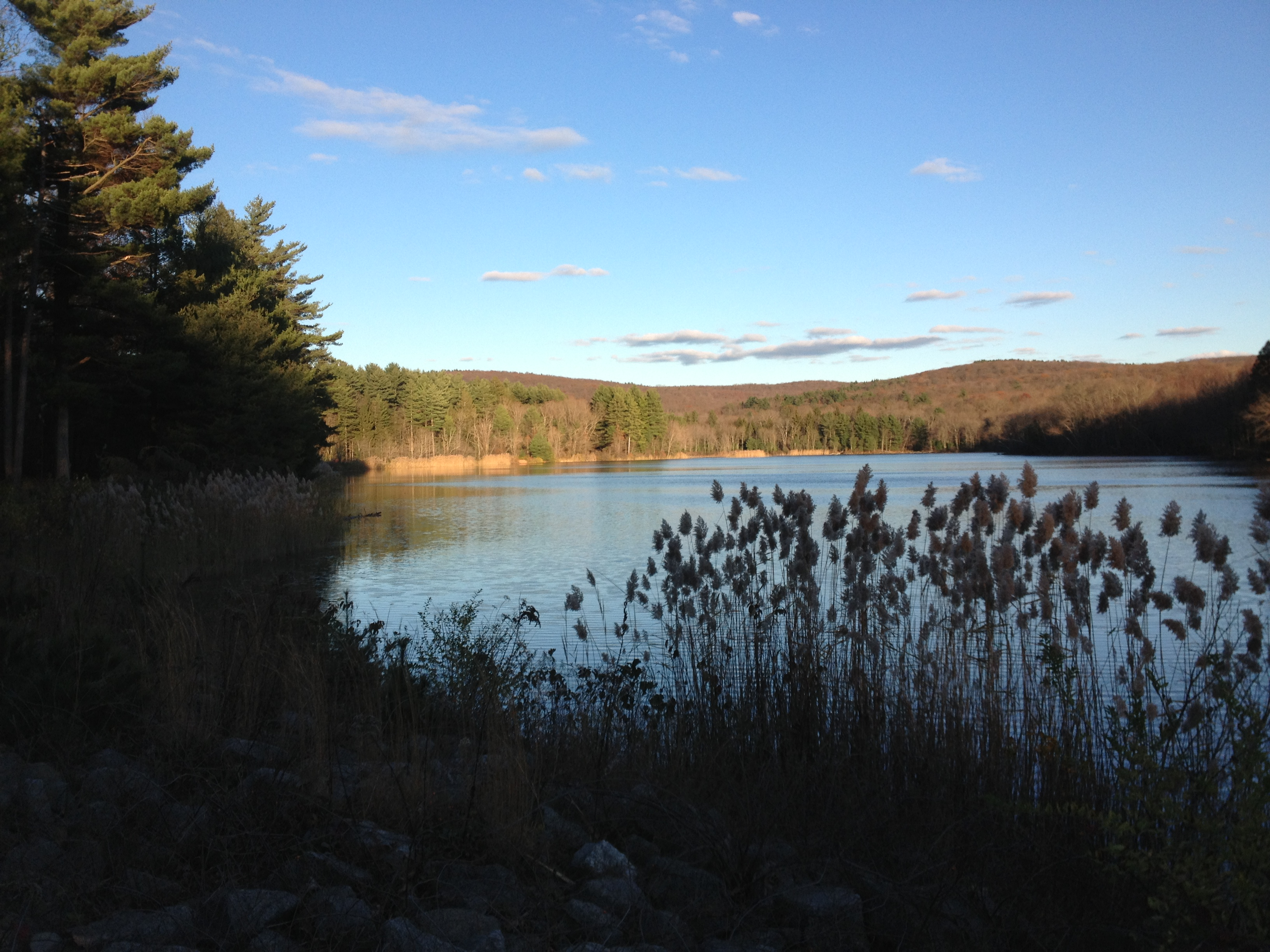
Portland Reservoir, Reeves Lookout State Wildlife Area, Meshomasic State Forest, Portland, CT.

=== Recreation ===
There are eight miles (13 km) of well-maintained dirt roads, originally built by the CCC, open for seasonal driving in the forest. Hunting, mountain biking, off roading, and hiking are also permitted in the forest. A public shooting range operated by the CT DEP is located within the State Forest off of Toll Gate Road in Glastonbury. Camping is not permitted within the state forest.

The blue-blazed Shenipsit Trail, maintained by the Connecticut Forest and Park Association, runs north–south through Connecticut. It starts in the Shenipsit State Forest just north of Soapstone Mountain and ends in the Meshomasic State Forest on Gadpouch Road. The trail runs along a ridge in the southern part of the forest where there are several vistas overlooking the Connecticut River, nearby Middletown, and the surrounding forest. 12 of the trail's 40 miles (64 km) are within the Meshomasic State Forest.

== See also ==
- List of Connecticut state forests
