= Flatbush Avenue Connector =

- Map of Hartford in central Connecticut with Flatbush Avenue Connector highlighted in red

Route information
- Maintained by CTDOT
- Length: 0.7 mi (1,100 m)
- Component highways: SR 504 (unsigned) entire length

Major junctions
- South end: Flatbush Avenue in Hartford
- North end: I-84 / US 6 in Hartford

Location
- Country: United States
- State: Connecticut
- Counties: Hartford

Highway system
- Connecticut State Highway System; Interstate; US; State; SSR; SR; Scenic

State Road 504 (SR 504), also known as the Flatbush Avenue Connector, is a two-lane divided freeway in Connecticut that runs 0.70 miles (1.13 km) within the city of Hartford. Its southern terminus is an intersection with Flatbush Avenue and the northern terminus is the interchange with I-84/US 6 at exit 45.

== Route description ==
The Flatbush Avenue Connector starts at an intersection with Flatbush Avenue. The roadway runs northward alongside a creek as a two-lane divided freeway. After 0.70 miles (1.13 km) through wooded suburban surroundings, the single northbound lane merges into eastbound I-84/US 6.

== History ==
SR 504 was once planned to be a short freeway to connect with the Berlin Turnpike (U.S. Route 5 and Route 15) near the South Meadows Expressway connector. This was once planned as part of the old planned Route 9 freeway (renumbered to the planned Route 189 freeway in 1963). Route 9 was moved westward and Route 189 never made it south from north side of Hartford. In 1963, however, the state proposed the corridor as the Cedar Ridge Connector with no number, leading from its current terminus at I-84 to U.S. 5/Route 15 in Wethersfield. The short freeway planned to include an interchange with a planned but cancelled Route 71 freeway leading to New Britain.

Circa 2015, the viaduct carrying the northbound ramp to eastbound I-84 was removed, and a new alignment adjacent to the southbound off ramp from westbound I-84 was built.

== Future ==
Exit 45 is currently an incomplete interchange, with ramps only for I-84 westbound to SR 504 (left exit) and Route 504 onto I-84 eastbound. The latest plans for the region include completing the interchange, providing access to points west, and moving a ramp to eliminate the left exit. Instead of creating a fully directional interchange, the state might build a diamond interchange or variant, and possibly open up surface access from the north.

== Exit list ==
The entire route is in Hartford, Hartford County.

mi	km	Destinations	Notes
0.0	0.0	Flatbush Avenue	Southern terminus; at-grade intersection
0.7	1.1	I-84 east (US 6 east) – East Hartford, Manchester	Northern terminus; exit 45 on I-84
1.000 mi = 1.609 km; 1.000 km = 0.621 mi
