= Wilbur Cross Highway =

Highway in Connecticut, United States

- Map of northern Connecticut with Wilbur Cross Highway highlighted in red

Route information
- Length: 46.41 mi (74.69 km)
- Existed: 1940–present
- Component highways: US 5 / Route 15 from Wethersfield, CT to East Hartford, CT; I-84 from East Hartford, CT to Sturbridge, MA; US 6 from East Hartford, CT to Manchester, CT

Major junctions
- South end: US 5 / Route 15 / Berlin Turnpike in Wethersfield, CT
- I-91 / SR 530 in Hartford, CT US 5 / Route 2 / SR 502 / SR 517 in East Hartford, CT I-84 / US 6 in East Hartford, CT I-384 in East Hartford, CT I-291 in Manchester, CT
- North end: I-90 Toll / Mass Pike in Sturbridge, MA

Location
- Country: United States
- States: Connecticut, Massachusetts
- Counties: CT: Hartford, Tolland, Windham; MA: Hampden, Worcester

Highway system
- Connecticut State Highway System; Interstate; US; State; SSR; SR; Scenic
- Massachusetts State Highway System; Interstate; US; State

The Wilbur Cross Highway is a freeway running along a portion of Connecticut Route 15 and U.S. Route 5 from Wethersfield to East Hartford, Connecticut, and then continuing northeast as a section of Interstate 84, part of which is also cosigned as U.S. Route 6. The freeway ends at a junction with the tolled Massachusetts Turnpike in Sturbridge, Massachusetts. The entire route was formerly signed as Route 15.

== Route description ==
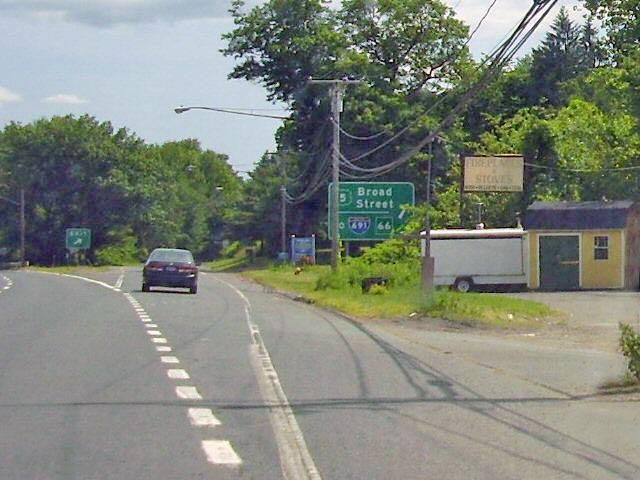
South end of the overlap between Route 15 and US 5. US 5 is signed as an unnumbered exit indicating "To I-691, Route 66

=== Route 15 and U.S. Route 5 ===
The Wilbur Cross Highway begins as a Y-interchange with the Berlin Turnpike in Wethersfield. South of here, Route 15 and U.S. Route 5 (US 5) continue south along the turnpike. The highway proceeds in a northeasterly direction and has an interchange with Route 99 (Old Route 9) before entering Hartford and reaching interchanges with Interstate 91 (I-91) and the Hartford–Brainard Airport access road. The highway then crosses the Connecticut River by way of the Charter Oak Bridge, curving to a more east–west direction, before merging into the median of I-84 in East Hartford.

=== Interstate 84 ===
US 6 is cosigned with I-84 on the Wilbur Cross Highway from exit 57 in East Hartford to exit 60 in Manchester. I-84 intersects one of the remnants of an abandoned project, I-384, as part of a three-mile (4.8 km) series of complex interchanges in Manchester including the end of the US 6 concurrency at exit 60, and a connection to the only built as originally planned portion of I-291 at exit 61.

Beyond Manchester, I-84 climbs steadily from the Connecticut River Valley and passes through the Tolland County towns of Vernon, Tolland, and Willington. After briefly entering the Windham County town of Ashford, it reenters Tolland County in the town of Union. After exit 74 (Route 171), I-84 crosses the Massachusetts state line. All lanes eventually enter into Sturbridge, but the westbound lanes pass briefly through the town of Holland before entering Sturbridge. Eight miles (13 km) later, I-84 reaches its eastern terminus at the Massachusetts Turnpike (I-90).

== History ==
The highway was built in the 1940s, before the Interstate Highway era, as a continuation of the Wilbur Cross Parkway, which itself is a continuation of the Merritt Parkway – all of which were once signed Route 15. Originally, the parkways were to span continuously from Greenwich to Union, but with the opening of Interstate 91, the planned segment between Meriden and Hartford was never built, and Route 15 was instead routed along the Berlin Turnpike.

The road was completed in 1952, while it was extended to the Massachusetts Turnpike in 1957.

In 1958, the highway north of the Charter Oak Bridge was cosigned as I-84, as part of the interstate highway's planned route through Connecticut.

In 1968, the I-84 designation was moved to a proposed highway from Hartford to Providence, and the then-cosigned portion with Route 15 was renumbered to I-86.

The two lane portion of road was widened to four lanes from 1969 to 1973.

The Route 15 designation remained cosigned with I-86 section south of the Massachusetts border until October 1, 1980, when it was truncated to its current northern terminus at exit 57 of I-84. The I-84 designation was restored in 1984 when the planned highway to Providence was cancelled.

From 1948 to 1982, US 44 was signed along the highway from exit 68 to exit 84.

The Charter Oak Bridge, which carries the highway across the Connecticut River, has been operational since 1942. Due to the bridge's failing condition and the clogging on the nearby Bissell and Founders Bridges in the late 1980s, the Charter Oak Bridge and approach was completely rebuilt in 1991 to its current form.

The toll plaza at the Massachusetts Turnpike was removed in 2016.

On June 9, 2015, Governor Dannel Malloy announced a five-year, $200 million construction project to rebuild the interchange between US-5/CT-15 and I-91 at the west end of the bridge. Although the interchange was rebuilt during the late 1980s and early 1990s along with the Charter Oak Bridge and the US-5/CT-15 portions of the Wilbur Cross Highway, traffic along the section had increased significantly since the reconstruction and the removal of the two connector ramps between I-91 and the Founders Bridge (CT-2), which were located further north, closer to Downtown Hartford. The Charter Oak Bridge took over these connections following its replacement in 1991, and became the main southeast bypass of Hartford for traffic traveling on I-91 and I-84. The project included replacing the single-lane on-ramp from I-91 Northbound to CT-15 Northbound, which was exit 29 at the time (now exit 36C), with a double-lane ramp and separating the I-91 and CT-15 carriageways, which at the time weaved together for one mile approaching the interchange. These upgrades helped improve connections between I-91 and I-84. The Charter Oak Bridge itself was not replaced as part of the project. However, it was rehabilitated to extend its service life, which included a new median barrier, the repair and resurfacing of the bridge deck, and some widening of the bridge on the western end to accommodate the new ramps to and from I-91. The new exit ramp opened on May 26, 2021, with the entire project being completed in October 2022.

== Exit list ==
Exit numbers correspond to those of Route 15 and Interstate 84. The exit numbers on Route 15 were changed to mile-based numbers in 2025. The exit numbers on I-84 will be changed to mile-based numbers in mid-2026. Exit numbers in Massachusetts were changed to mile-based numbers in 2021. Old exit numbers correspond to when I-84 was signed as Route 15.

State	County	Location	mi	km	Old exit	New exit	Destinations	Notes
Connecticut	Hartford	Wethersfield	0.00	0.00		–	US 5 south / Route 15 south (Berlin Turnpike)	Western terminus; western end of US 5/Route 15 concurrency
Connecticut	Hartford	Wethersfield	1.76	2.83	85	79	Route 99 south – Wethersfield, Rocky Hill	Northern terminus of Route 99
Connecticut	Hartford	Hartford	2.16– 3.42	3.48– 5.50	86-89	80A-81	I-91 / Brainard Road / Airport Road (SR 530 west) / I-84 west – New Haven, New York City, Springfield	Signed as exits 80A (I-91 south), 80B (Brainard Road/ Airport Road) and 81 (I-91 north); no westbound access to I-91 north; exits 35B and 36 on I-91
Connecticut	Hartford	Connecticut River	4.01	6.45	Charter Oak Bridge			
Connecticut	Hartford	East Hartford	4.06	6.53	90	82	US 5 north (Main Street) / Route 2 / East River Drive (SR 502) – Norwich	Eastern end of US 5 concurrency; no westbound access to Route 2, signed at exit 83 southbound
Connecticut	Hartford	East Hartford	4.85	7.81	91	83	Silver Lane (SR 502)	Eastbound exit and westbound entrance
Connecticut	Hartford	East Hartford	5.64	9.08	57	64A	I-84 west (Yankee Expressway) to I-91 north – Hartford Route 15 ends	Westbound exit and eastbound entrance; western end of I-84/US 6 concurrency; northern terminus of Route 15
Connecticut	Hartford	East Hartford	5.95	9.58		–	Silver Lane (SR 502)	Westbound exit from Restricted Lanes
Connecticut	Hartford	East Hartford	5.95	9.58	58	64B	Roberts Street / Silver Lane (SR 502) to Burnside Avenue (US 44)	No eastbound exit
Connecticut	Hartford	East Hartford	6.82	10.98	91		Forbes Street	Closed to make way for construction exit 67
Connecticut	Hartford	East Hartford	7.23– 7.70	11.64– 12.39	59	67	I-384 east – Providence	Western terminus and exit 1A on I-384; former routing of I-84
Connecticut	Hartford	Manchester	8.38	13.49	92 / 60	68	US 6 east / US 44 (Middle Turnpike West / Burnside Avenue) – Manchester	Eastern end of US 6 concurrency; signed for US 6 eastbound, Burnside westbound
Connecticut	Hartford	Manchester	8.59– 8.97	13.82– 14.44	61	69	I-291 west – Windsor	Eastern terminus and exits 5B-C on I-291; former Route 291
Connecticut	Hartford	Manchester	9.56	15.39	93 / 62	70	Buckland Street	
Connecticut	Hartford	Manchester	9.56	15.39		–	Buckland Street	Eastbound exit from Restricted Lanes
Connecticut	Hartford	Manchester	12.40	19.96	94 / 63	71	Route 30 / Route 83 – Manchester, South Windsor	
Connecticut	Tolland	Vernon	13.31	21.42	95 / 64-65	72	Route 30 / Route 83 – Vernon, Rockville, Talcottville	Signed as exits 64 (Route 30 south/Route 83) and 65 (Route 30 north) eastbound; no eastbound entrance
Connecticut	Tolland	Vernon	13.81	22.23		–	I-84 west (Restricted Lanes)	Eastern terminus of Restricted Lanes
Connecticut	Tolland	Vernon	14.88	23.95	96 / 65	73	Route 30 – Vernon Center	Westbound exit and entrance
Connecticut	Tolland	Vernon	15.75	25.35	97 / 66	75	To Tunnel Road (SR 533) – Vernon, Bolton	Access via SR 541/SR 542
Connecticut	Tolland	Vernon	17.91– 18.26	28.82– 29.39	98 / 67	77	Route 31 – Rockville, Coventry	
Connecticut	Tolland	Tolland	21.66	34.86	99 / 68	81	Route 195 – Tolland, Mansfield, Storrs	Access to the University of Connecticut
Connecticut	Tolland	Tolland	24.63	39.64	100 / 69	84	Route 74 to US 44 – Willington, Tolland, Rockville, Putnam	
Connecticut	Tolland	Willington	26.13	42.05	101 / 70	85	Route 32 – Stafford Springs, Willington, Mansfield, Willimantic	
Connecticut	Tolland	Willington	28.28– 28.86	45.51– 46.45	102 / 71	87	Route 320 south (Ruby Road) – Willington	Northern terminus of Route 320
Connecticut	Windham–Tolland county line	Ashford–Union town line	32.66	52.56	104 / 72	92	Route 89 – Stafford Springs, Westford, Ashford	
Connecticut	Tolland	Union	34.08	54.85	105 / 73	93	Route 190 – Union, Stafford Springs	
Connecticut	Tolland	Union	37.99– 38.55	61.14– 62.04	106 / 74	97	Route 171 east / Holland Road – Union, Holland, Mass	Western terminus of Route 171
			38.70	62.28	Connecticut–Massachusetts state line			
Massachusetts	Hampden	Holland	38.99	62.75		–	Haynes Street	Westbound entrance only
Massachusetts	Worcester	Sturbridge	41.95	67.51	1	3	Mashapaug Road – Southbridge, Sturbridge	Access via Haynes Street
Massachusetts	Worcester	Sturbridge	43.78	70.46	2	5	To Route 131 – Sturbridge, Southbridge	Access via Haynes Street
Massachusetts	Worcester	Sturbridge	45.25– 45.57	72.82– 73.34	3	6	US 20 – Charlton, Palmer	Signed as exits 6A (US 20 east) and 6B (US 20 west)
Massachusetts	Worcester	Sturbridge	46.41	74.69			I-90 Toll / Mass Pike – Worcester, Boston, Springfield, Albany, NY I-84 ends	Eastern terminus; eastern terminus of I-84; exit 78 on I-90 / Mass Pike
1.000 mi = 1.609 km; 1.000 km = 0.621 mi: Closed/former; Concurrency terminus; Electronic toll collection; HOV only; Incomplete access
