= Interstate 84 in Connecticut =

Highway in Connecticut

Interstate 84
- I-84 highlighted in red

Route information
- Maintained by CTDOT
- Length: 97.90 mi (157.55 km)
- Existed: 1969–present
- NHS: Entire route

Major junctions
- West end: I-84 at the New York state line in Danbury
- US 6 / US 7 / US 202 in Danbury; Route 8 in Waterbury; I-691 / Route 322 in Southington; Route 72 in New Britain; US 6 in Farmington; Route 9 in Farmington; I-91 / US 44 in Hartford; Route 2 in East Hartford; Route 15 in East Hartford; I-384 in East Hartford; I-291 in Manchester
- East end: I-84 at the Massachusetts state line in Union

Location
- Country: United States
- State: Connecticut
- Counties: Fairfield, New Haven, Hartford, Tolland, Windham

Highway system
- Interstate Highway System; Main; Auxiliary; Suffixed; Business; Future; Connecticut State Highway System; Interstate; US; State; SSR; SR; Scenic
← Route 83	→ Route 85

Interstate 84 (I-84) is an east–west Interstate Highway across the state of Connecticut through Danbury, Waterbury, Hartford, and Union.

== Route description ==
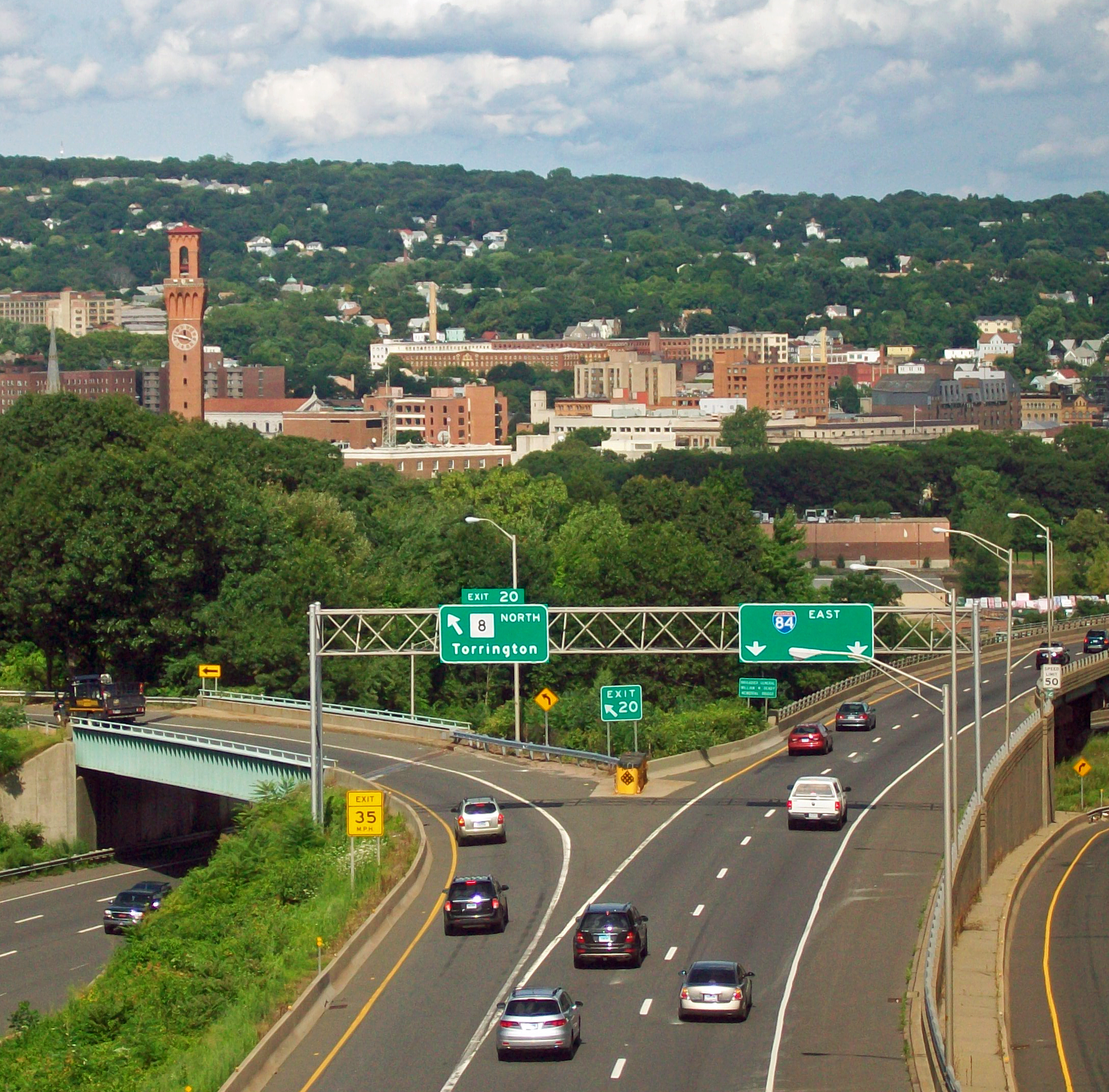
I-84 (looking eastbound) just before becoming an elevated viaduct to cross downtown Waterbury

I-84 enters Danbury from the town of Southeast, New York, and is designated the Yankee Expressway for the next 62 miles (100 km). About 3.5 miles (5.6 km) to the east, US Route 7 (US 7) joins near Danbury Fair as I-84 turns north. US 6 and US 202 join to form a four-way concurrency for the next three miles (4.8 km) US 7 and US 202 split off north toward New Milford. US 6 leaves I-84 climbs away from Danbury into the more rural towns of Bethel and Brookfield.

US 6 rejoins I-84, it turns to the northeast and descends to cross the Housatonic River on the Rochambeau Bridge, into New Haven County. After US 6 leaves I-84 once again in Southbury, I-84 proceeds through hilly terrain into Middlebury, becoming more of an urban freeway as it enters the city of Waterbury, where it intersects the Route 8 expressway and crosses the Naugatuck River on an elevated dual-decked viaduct known locally as the Mixmaster. After passing through Cheshire, I-84 intersects the western end of I-691 at the Cheshire–Southington town line, which is also the New Haven–Hartford county line.

I-84 turns more northerly for a stretch to (Route 229), which provides access to Lake Compounce and ESPN World Headquarters. The freeway heads more northeasterly to Plainville, where it has a brief 0.5-mile (0.80 km) concurrency with Route 72 to the New Britain city line. From the Route 72 junction through Farmington, West Hartford, and into Hartford, I-84 has many left-hand exits and entrances and sharp curves, which were built for a planned network of freeways. In Farmington, US 6 joins I-84 once again and both meet the northern end of the Route 9 expressway at a half-used multilevel stack interchange that was originally planned to be part of the mostly-canceled I-291 Hartford Beltway. I-84 and US 6 pass through West Hartford into Hartford (the largest city along the length of the eastern I-84) where they intersect I-91, just before US 44 briefly joins to cross the Connecticut River into East Hartford on the Bulkeley Bridge, which is the oldest bridge on the Interstate System.

After the bridge, US 44 leaves, the name of the highway changes to the Lieutenant Brian L. Aselton Memorial Highway, and I-84 meets the Route 2 expressway, which provides access to the southeastern suburbs of Hartford. As I-84 passes the northern end of the Route 15 expressway, it inherits the Wilbur Cross Highway name for the rest of its length. From 1968 until 1984, the I-84 designation ended here, and the highway became I-86 for the rest of its length, as I-84 was once planned to be built east toward Providence, Rhode Island. I-84 intersects one of the remnants of the abandoned project, I-384, as part of a three-mile (4.8 km) series of complex interchanges in Manchester including the end of the US 6 concurrency, and a connection to the only built as originally planned portion of I-291.

Beyond Manchester, I-84 climbs steadily from the Connecticut River Valley and passes through the Tolland County towns of Vernon, Tolland, and Willington. Junctions in Tolland and Willington connect to Route 195 and Route 32, respectively, both providing access to the main campus of the University of Connecticut in Storrs, Connecticut, south toward Windham.

North of Willington, I-84 briefly enters the Windham County town of Ashford and reenters Tolland County in the town of Union. After (Route 171), I-84 crosses the Massachusetts state line.

== History ==
=== New York to Hartford to Massachusetts (1961-1968) ===
I-84 opened in stages from the New York State Line in Danbury starting in 1961, finally connecting to Hartford in 1969. In Hartford, I-84 crossed the Bulkeley Bridge and continued towards Sturbridge, MA, along the existing Wilbur Cross Highway, matching I-84's present alignment.

Between 1968 and 1984, I-84 was reassigned to a proposed freeway to connect Hartford to Providence, RI. The segment northeast of Hartford was redesignated as I-86. In 1984, the freeway to Providence was cancelled, and I-84 reverted to its current ailignment. Some isolated stretches of freeway built towards Providence were reassigned to other route numbers.

=== Proposed 1970s route east of Hartford ===
Interstate 82
- Location: East Hartford–Providence
- Existed: 1956–1968
- History: Redesignated as I-84 in 1968

Interstate 84
- Location: East Hartford–Providence
- Existed: 1968–1984
- History: Canceled; completed sections redesignated as I-384 and US 6 in 1984

A highway connecting Hartford and Providence was first brought up in 1944 as an upgrade to US 6 from Manchester to the Rhode Island state line. The plan eventually adapted to a submission to the 1956 Interstate Highway Plan but was declined. It was resubmitted in the 1968 plan and was granted along with 1,500 other miles (2,400 km) of Interstate.

The highway was originally designated as Interstate 82 (I-82) but was changed shortly after to its well-known designation, Interstate 84 (I-84). In 1970 through 1973, the first segments of the highway started construction, the segment now designated as I-384, and the Willimantic Bypass. When these isolated segments were completed, they were designated for the future Interstate, starkly different from today's signs. The signs remained on the Willimantic Bypass up to a decade after the cancellation of the project.

The planned I-84 was going to also incorporate a cloverleaf intersection with I-295 in Johnston, Rhode Island, and use the under-construction Dennis J. Roberts Expressway and built Huntington Expressway to Providence before the project was shelved. Briefly, there was an idea to use the southern/unused portion of the highway for Interstate 184 (I-184) but was disapproved by the FHA.

An environmental study by the Rhode Island Department of Transportation (RIDOT) was done in 1972; it was found the highway would cause heavy impact to Scituate Reservoir, the main drinking supply for Providence. After conducting multiple other studies, including briefly considering an alternate southern alignment that would bypass the Scituate Reservoir to the south and connected I-84 to the Route 37 Expressway, Rhode Island ended up canceling their segment of the highway in 1982, which ended up causing Connecticut to cut the segment to I-395 in Plainfield. Without Rhode Island, the highway was fully canceled in 1983, and the mileage was returned for other projects.

After the highway was canceled, the only inland route to Providence from Hartford was either US 44 or US 6. Many projects have since happened to improve the roads, mainly in Connecticut. One major one was improving the "Suicide 6" area of US 6 between Bolton and Columbia. Since the cancelation, other plans to have a freeway link between the two built segments have been proposed, including one in 2001, but was short lived, only lasting to 2003 before becoming dormant.

In the 1992 long-range transportation plan released by RIDOT, a freeway has been added along the original route of I-84 that will connect to the Route 695 freeway on the Rhode Island–Connecticut border.

==== I-86 relation ====
Interstate 86
- Location: East Hartford–Union (Massachusetts state line)
- Length: 31.27 mi (50.32 km)
- Existed: 1968–1984
- History: Redesignated as I-84 in August 1984

The section of I-84 between East Hartford, Connecticut, (at the present-day junction with I-384) and Sturbridge, Massachusetts, (I-90) was for a time signed as I-86 (unrelated to present-day I-86 in New York and Pennsylvania). Signs stating "I-84 Ends, I-86 to Boston" (eastbound) and "I-86 Ends, I-84 to Hartford" (westbound) were posted where the change took place; later, when I-84 was restored to its original routing, new signs went up that read "I-86 is now I-84". Exit numbering on I-86 was that of the road's predecessor, Route 15, in a sequence beginning on New York's Hutchinson River Parkway. Exits were renumbered to correspond with the rest of I-84 in Connecticut when the road was redesignated in 1984. The present I-384 as well as the present US 6 bypass near Willimantic, both of which were a part of what was then I-84's planned easterly continuation, were also numbered I-84 prior to 1984 even though they lacked any direct connection to the rest of I-84 at that time. (One had to use Silver Lane in East Hartford to travel between the two stretches of the highway.) These two sections were renumbered. The western segment became I-384, and the eastern one became part of US 6 when what was then I-86 was renumbered I-84.

The present 4-way interchange between I-84, I-384, and I-291 in Manchester reflects the planned extension of I-84 towards Providence; the I-84 through lanes coming west from Hartford align with the present-day lanes heading east on I-384. Similarly, the Wilbur Cross Highway (CT Route 15) merges with I-84 on the left side in East Hartford, and aligns with the lanes of I-84 heading northeast towards Sturbridge. As designed, this would have allowed I-84 to continue east towards Rhode Island, and the Wilbur Cross Highway to follow I-86 to Massachusetts.

=== Upgrades ===
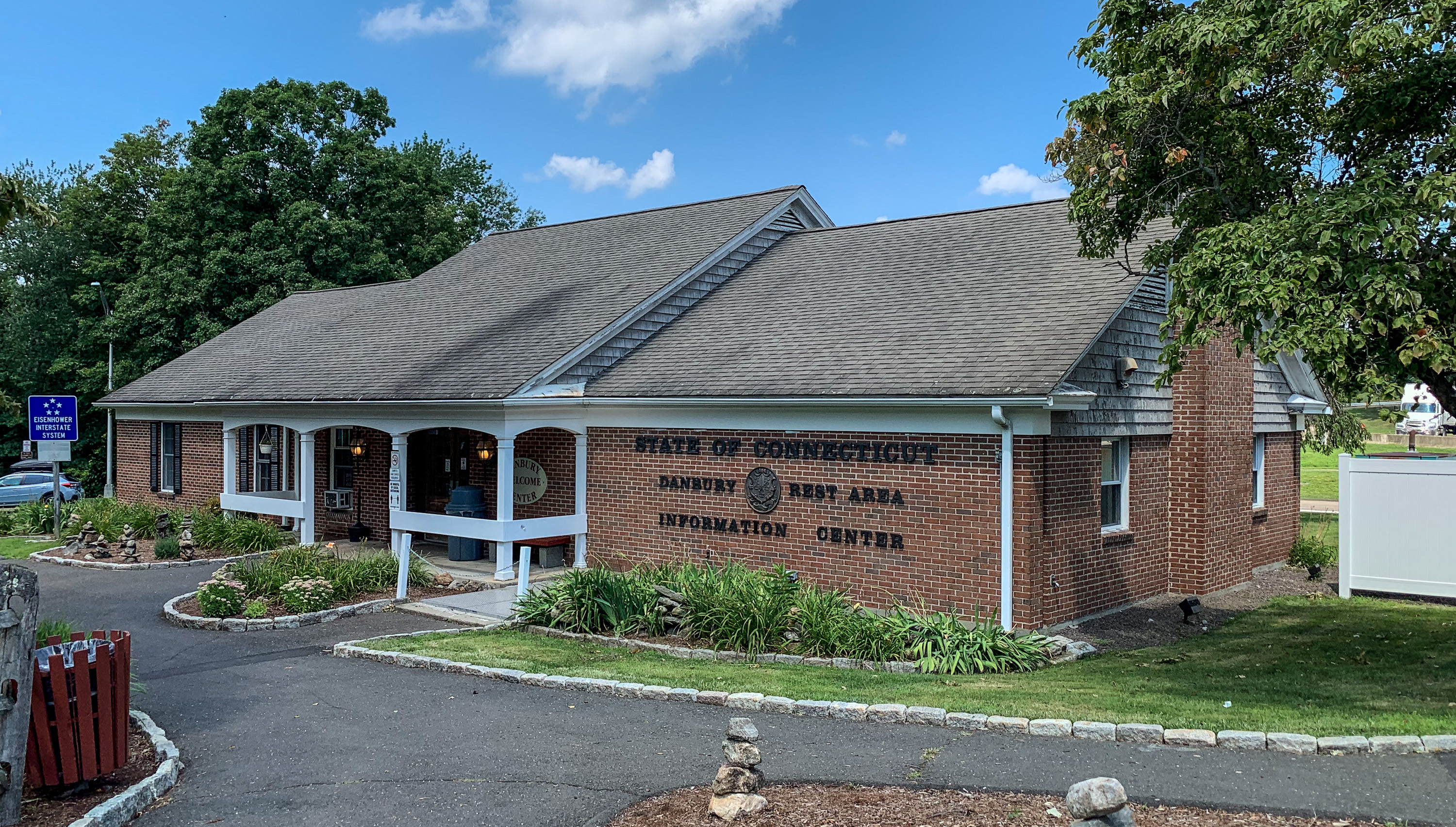
Danbury Rest Area and Information Center on I-84 eastbound

Sections of I-84 in Connecticut were reconstructed and widened from the mid-1970s into the mid-1980s. Another section through Danbury was widened from four lanes to six lanes in 1985 and 1986. Widening of the highway through Danbury was funded by Union Carbide as part of building its world headquarters in Danbury. From roughly 1976 to 1988 the former I-86 portion from East Hartford to the Massachusetts state line was completely rebuilt from a narrow four-lane parkway to a much wider profile ranging from six lanes at the Massachusetts state line, expanding to eight lanes in Vernon, to 12 lanes with high-occupancy vehicle lanes (HOV lanes) in East Hartford. The original route, then known as Route 15, featured pit latrines at its pull-offs or rest areas. As of 2014, planning is underway for the I-84 Hartford Project to replace and possibly redesign a two-mile (3.2 km) stretch of mostly elevated highway in Hartford. On April 22, 2015, construction began on widening the highway from exit 23 to exit 25A in Waterbury from four lanes to six lanes.

A widening project along the congested stretch of I-84 through Waterbury and Cheshire has been beset by cost overruns, delays, and construction defects involving storm drains, as state and federal officials have launched criminal investigations stemming from this project. This episode has waned local enthusiasm for a proposed $2-billion reconstruction of the Mixmaster interchange in downtown Waterbury. Cost estimates for the Mixmaster replacement have increased to $3 billion. Connecticut Attorney-General Richard Blumenthal has begun a lawsuit against the contractor and an engineering firm in response to threats from the US Department of Transportation (USDOT) to withhold funds from the project. On May 18, 2007, the Republican-American reported this area had defective light poles, while Governor Jodi Rell released an audit report of the construction disaster.

== Future ==
The I-84 Hartford Project is a Connecticut Department of Transportation (CTDOT) project to address structural deficiencies within the I-84 corridor approximately between Flatbush Avenue (exit 45) and the I-91 interchange in Hartford, including a 3,200-foot (980 m) elevated section known as the Aetna Viaduct. Since it became apparent in the 1980s that this section of I-84 in Hartford was deteriorating, CTDOT has considered how best to repair or reconstruct the corridor. Since that time, many inspections have been carried out and frequent repairs made to keep the highway safe and functioning.

In 2010, the Capitol Region Council of Governments (CRCOG), the City of Hartford, and CTDOT collaborated on a study of the corridor to begin the process of exploring reconstruction options. That study looked at several concepts, including the rebuilding of the viaduct "in-kind", as well as several reconstruction alternatives that would alter the configuration of the highway. The alternatives developed for that study were conceptual in nature—they did not look in depth at traffic, engineering feasibility, or environmental impact. However, the strong stakeholder input as part of that effort was helpful in leading to CTDOT's decision to initiate the I-84 Hartford Project, to build on the good work of that earlier study. The I-84 Hartford Project will be a full and comprehensive evaluation leading to a workable solution. The I-84 Hartford Project will examine the feasibility and assess the impact of a range of concepts. Following full examination of the impacts and benefits of feasible alternatives, and, in collaboration with stakeholders and the public, CTDOT will make a final decision on how to reconstruct this section of the I-84 corridor.

== Exit list ==
As part of a sign replacement project between East Hartford and Manchester, CTDOT will be renumbering the exits on I-84 to mileage-based numbers in mid-2026.

County	Location	mi	km	Old exit	New exit	Destinations	Notes
Fairfield	Danbury	0.00	0.00	–	–	I-84 west – Newburgh	Continuation into New York; to I-684
Fairfield	Danbury	0.04– 0.44	0.064– 0.71		1	US 6 / US 202 / Saw Mill Road	Eastbound exit and westbound entrance extend into New York; US 6/US 202 not signed
Fairfield	Danbury	0.78– 1.36	1.26– 2.19		2	US 6 / US 202 (Mill Plain Road) / Old Ridgebury Road – Rest Area / Connecticut Welcome Center	Signed as exits 2A (Old Ridgebury Road) and 2B (US 6/US 202 Mill Plain Road) westbound; no westbound access to the Rest Area / Connecticut Welcome Center
Fairfield	Danbury	3.24– 3.70	5.21– 5.95		3	US 7 south – Norwalk	Western end of US 7 concurrency; exit 9 on US 7; also serves Danbury Airport
Fairfield	Danbury	3.76	6.05		4	US 6 west / US 202 west (Lake Avenue)	Western end of US 6/US 202 concurrency
Fairfield	Danbury	5.27	8.48		5	Route 37 / Route 39 / Route 53 – Downtown Danbury, Bethel	Route 37 not signed westbound
Fairfield	Danbury	5.84	9.40		6	Route 37 – New Fairfield	Westbound exit and eastbound entrance
Fairfield	Danbury	7.34– 7.77	11.81– 12.50		7	US 7 north / US 202 east – Brookfield, New Milford	Eastern end of US 7/US 202 concurrency; exit 10 on US 7
Fairfield	Danbury–Bethel line	8.17– 8.79	13.15– 14.15		8	US 6 east / Newtown Road (SR 806 west) – Bethel	Eastern end of US 6 concurrency; US 6 not signed westbound
Fairfield	Brookfield–Newtown line	11.44	18.41	9	11	Route 25 – Brookfield	
Fairfield	Newtown	15.12	24.33	10	15	US 6 west – Newtown, Sandy Hook	Western end of US 6 concurrency
Fairfield	Newtown	16.14– 16.64	25.97– 26.78	11	16	Route 34 to Route 25 – Derby, New Haven, Bridgeport	Access via SSR 490
Fairfield	Newtown	18	29	12		Underhill Road / Lake Drive	Removed in the 1970s; right-in/right-out interchange
Housatonic River		18.48	29.74	Rochambeau Bridge			
New Haven	Southbury	18.74	30.16	13	18	River Road	Eastbound exit and westbound entrance
New Haven	Southbury	20.21	32.52	14	20	Route 172 – South Britain	Southern terminus of Route 172
New Haven	Southbury	22.00	35.41	15	21	US 6 east / Route 67 – Southbury	Eastern end of US 6 concurrency
New Haven	Southbury	24.80	39.91	16	24	Route 188 – Southford, Middlebury	Signed for Southford westbound, Middlebury eastbound
New Haven	Middlebury–Waterbury line	29.81	47.97	17	30	Route 63 – Watertown, Naugatuck	Eastbound exit and westbound entrance
New Haven	Middlebury–Waterbury line	30.48	49.05	17	30	Route 64 / Route 63 – Middlebury, Watertown	Westbound exit and eastbound entrance; eastern terminus of Route 64
New Haven	Waterbury	31.35	50.45	18	31	Chase Parkway (SSR 845)	Eastbound exit and westbound entrance
New Haven	Waterbury	31.65	50.94	18	31	West Main Street / Highland Avenue	Westbound exit only
New Haven	Waterbury	32.02	51.53	19-20	32A-B	Route 8 – Bridgeport, Torrington	Mixmaster Interchange; signed as exits 32A (Route 8 south) and 32B (Route 8 north); exits 30A and 30C on Route 8
New Haven	Waterbury	32.45– 32.76	52.22– 52.72	21	32C	Meadow Street / Bank Street	Westbound exit only
New Haven	Waterbury	32.60	52.46	22	33A	Downtown Waterbury	Eastbound exit only; access via South Main Street
New Haven	Waterbury	33.02	53.14	23	33B	Route 69 (Hamilton Avenue) – Wolcott, Prospect	Eastbound exit only
New Haven	Waterbury	33.56	54.01	22	33A	Union Street – Downtown Waterbury	Westbound exit and entrance
New Haven	Waterbury	34.21	55.06	23	33B	Route 69 (Hamilton Avenue)	Westbound exit and eastbound entrance
New Haven	Waterbury	34.36	55.30	25	34	Harpers Ferry Road / Reidville Drive	Eastbound exit and westbound entrance
New Haven	Waterbury	35.62	57.32	25	35	East Main Street (SR 801) / Scott Road	Westbound exit and eastbound entrance
New Haven	Waterbury	36.73	59.11	25A	36	Austin Road	Serves University of Bridgeport
New Haven	Cheshire	38.12	61.35	26	38	Route 70 – Cheshire, Prospect	Prospect not signed eastbound; western terminus of Route 70
Hartford	Southington	40.04	64.44	27	40A	I-691 east – Meriden	Western terminus and exits 8A and 8B on I-691
Hartford	Southington	40.04	64.44	28	40B	Route 322 – Marion, Milldale, Wolcott	
Hartford	Southington	41.89	67.42	29	41	Route 10 – Milldale	Westbound left exit and eastbound entrance; access via SR 597
Hartford	Southington	42.52	68.43	30	42	West Main Street / Marion Avenue	
Hartford	Southington	44.34	71.36	31	44	Route 229 (West Street) – Bristol	Bristol not signed westbound; Southern terminus of Route 229; Serves Lake Compounce Amusement Park and ESPN World Headquarters
Hartford	Southington	46.23	74.40	32	46	Route 10 (Queen Street)	
Hartford	Plainville	48.98– 49.48	78.83– 79.63	33	48	Route 72 west / Route 372 (New Britain Avenue) – Bristol	Western end of Route 72 concurrency; no eastbound access via Route 372; exit 4A on Route 72
Hartford	Plainville	48.98– 49.48	78.83– 79.63	34	49	Route 372 / Crooked Street	Eastbound exit and entrance; access via (SR 536 north)
Hartford	New Britain	50.00– 50.61	80.47– 81.45	35	50	Route 72 east to Route 9 – New Britain, Middletown	Middletown not signed eastbound; Eastern end of Route 72 concurrency; exit 3 on Route 72
Hartford	New Britain	50.65– 51.19	81.51– 82.38	36	51	Slater Road	Left exit eastbound
Hartford	Farmington	53.24	85.68	37	53	Fienemann Road to US 6 west	US 6 not signed westbound
Hartford	Farmington	54.04– 54.35	86.97– 87.47	38	54A	US 6 west – Bristol	Western end of US 6 concurrency; westbound exit and eastbound entrance
Hartford	Farmington	54.04– 54.35	86.97– 87.47	39	54B	Route 4 – Farmington	Access via SR 508
Hartford	Farmington	54.99– 56.00	88.50– 90.12	39A	55	Route 9 south – Newington, New Britain	Northern terminus and exits 40A and 40B on Route 9 north; Signed for Newington eastbound, New Britain westbound
Hartford	West Hartford	56.27	90.56	40	56	Route 71 (New Britain Avenue) – Corbins Corner	
Hartford	West Hartford	57.23	92.10	41	57	South Main Street (Route 173 south) – Elmwood	
Hartford	West Hartford	58.05	93.42	42	58A	Trout Brook Drive - Elmwood	Westbound exit and eastbound entrance
Hartford	West Hartford	57.95– 58.40	93.26– 93.99	43	58B	Park Road – West Hartford Center	Access via SR 501
Hartford	West Hartford	59.17	95.22	44	59A	Prospect Avenue / New Park Avenue	Access via Caya Avenue / Kane Street
Hartford	Hartford	59.93	96.45	45	59B	Flatbush Avenue	Westbound exit and eastbound entrance; access via SR 504
Hartford	Hartford	60.45– 60.79	97.28– 97.83	46	60	Sisson Avenue	Access via SR 503
Hartford	Hartford	61.04	98.23	47	61A	Sigourney Street	Westbound exit and eastbound entrance
Hartford	Hartford	61.38– 61.77	98.78– 99.41	48A	61A	Asylum Street	Signed as exit 61B westbound
Hartford	Hartford	61.38– 61.77	98.78– 99.41	48B	61A	Capitol Avenue	Eastbound exit and westbound entrance
Hartford	Hartford	61.99	99.76	49	61B	Ann Uccello Street	Eastbound exit and westbound entrance; to the PeoplesBank Arena
Hartford	Hartford	62.04– 62.63	99.84– 100.79	50	62A	US 44 west (Main Street) to I-91 south – New Haven	Western end of US 44 concurrency; US 44 not signed eastbound; exit 38A on I-91
Hartford	Hartford	62.04– 62.63	99.84– 100.79	51-52	62B-C	I-91 – Bradley International Airport, Springfield, New Haven	Signed as exits 62B (I-91 north) and 62C (I-91 south); no westbound access to I-91 south; exits 38A and 38C on I-91
Hartford	Connecticut River	62.58– 62.82	100.71– 101.10	Bulkeley Bridge			
Hartford	East Hartford	62.95	101.31	53	63A	US 44 east (Connecticut Boulevard) / East River Drive – East Hartford	Eastern end of US 44 concurrency; no westbound exit
Hartford	East Hartford	63.18– 63.51	101.68– 102.21	54-55	63A-B	Route 2 – Norwich, New London, Downtown Hartford	Signed as exits 63A (Route 2 west) and 63B (Route 2 east); no eastbound access to Route 2 west; Route 2 west not signed; New London not signed
Hartford	East Hartford	63.18– 63.51	101.68– 102.21	56	63C	Governor Street – Downtown East Hartford	Access via SR 500; Downtown East Hartford not signed eastbound; exit was originally intended for the never-built I-284
Hartford	East Hartford				♦	Restricted Lanes – Buses and 2 person car pools	Western terminus of HOV lanes
Hartford	East Hartford	64.64	104.03	Transition between Yankee Expressway and Wilbur Cross Highway			
Hartford	East Hartford	64.64	104.03	57	64A	Route 15 south (Wilbur Cross Highway) to I-91 south – Charter Oak Bridge, New York City	Westbound exit and eastbound entrance; northern terminus of Route 15
Hartford	East Hartford	65.21	104.95	58	64B	Roberts Street / Silver Lane (SR 502) to Burnside Avenue (US 44)	
Hartford	East Hartford	65.21	104.95		♦	Silver Lane (SR 502)	HOV access only; westbound exit and eastbound entrance
Hartford	East Hartford	66.43	106.91	59	67	I-384 east – Providence	Western terminus and exit 1A on I-384; former routing of I-84
Hartford	East Hartford	66.43	106.91		♦	I-384 east – Providence	HOV access only; eastbound exit and westbound entrance; western terminus of I-384; former routing of I-84
Hartford	Manchester	68.05	109.52	60	68	US 6 east / US 44 (Middle Turnpike West / Burnside Avenue) – Manchester	Eastern end of US 6 concurrency; signed for US 6 eastbound, Burnside Avenue westbound
Hartford	Manchester			61	69	I-291 west – Windsor	Eastern terminus and exit 5B-C on I-291; former Route 291
Hartford	Manchester	69.84	112.40	62	70	Buckland Street	
Hartford	Manchester	69.84	112.40		♦	Buckland Street	HOV access only; eastbound exit and westbound entrance
Hartford	Manchester	71.60	115.23	63	71	Route 30 / Route 83 – South Windsor, Manchester	
Tolland	Vernon	73.00	117.48	64-65	72	Route 30 / Route 83 – Vernon Business District, Rockville, Talcottville	Signed as exits 64 (Route 30 south/Route 83) and 65 (Route 30 north) eastbound
Tolland	Vernon	73.00	117.48		♦	Route 30 / Route 83 – Vernon Center, Rockville	HOV access only; eastbound exit and westbound entrance
Tolland	Vernon	73.27	117.92	Eastern terminus of HOV lanes			
Tolland	Vernon	73.93	118.98	65	73	Route 30 – Vernon Center	Westbound exit and entrance
Tolland	Vernon	74.80	120.38	66	75	Tunnel Road (SR 533) – Vernon, Bolton	Access via SR 541/SR 542
Tolland	Vernon	77.28	124.37	67	77	Route 31 – Rockville, Coventry	
Tolland	Tolland	81.06	130.45	68	81	Route 195 – Tolland, Storrs	Serves University of Connecticut
Tolland	Tolland	83.99	135.17	69	84	Route 74 to US 44 – Willington	
Tolland	Willington	85.58	137.73	70	85	Route 32 – Stafford Springs, Willington, Mansfield, Willimantic	
Tolland	Willington	87.79	141.28	71	87	Route 320 south (Ruby Road)	Northern terminus of Route 320
Windham–Tolland county line	Ashford–Union line	92.05	148.14	72	92	Route 89 – Westford, Ashford	
Tolland	Union	93.41	150.33	73	93	Route 190 – Union	
Tolland	Union	97.38	156.72	74	97	Route 171 east / Holland Road – Union, Holland, Mass	Western terminus of Route 171
Tolland	Union	97.90	157.55	–	–	I-84 east (Wilbur Cross Highway) – Boston	Continuation into Massachusetts; to Mass Pike; former I-86
1.000 mi = 1.609 km; 1.000 km = 0.621 mi: Closed/former; Concurrency terminus; HOV only; Incomplete access

== Auxiliary routes ==
Interstate	City	Notes
Interstate 284	East Hartford	Unfinished and decommissioned. Partially exists as a freeway stub from I-84 to Governor Street. I-284 was originally planned to continue northward along the east bank of the Connecticut River to I-291.
Interstate 384	Manchester	
Interstate 484	Hartford	Unfinished and decommissioned. Partially exists as the Conland–Whitehead Highway
Interstate 684	Greenwich	This route extends for 1.4 miles (2.3 km) in Connecticut, with all interchanges in New York; originally designated as I-87

Interstate 84
Previous state: New York	Connecticut	Next state: Massachusetts
