= Interstate 84 (Pennsylvania–Massachusetts) =

Interstate Highway in the Northeastern U.S.

Interstate 84
- I-84 highlighted in red

Route information
- Length: 232.71 mi (374.51 km)
- Existed: August 14, 1957–present
- NHS: Entire route

Major junctions
- West end: I-81 / I-380 / US 6 in Dunmore, PA
- US 6 / US 209 in Matamoras, PA; Future I-86 / NY 17 in Middletown, NY; I-87 Toll / New York Thruway / NY 300 in Newburgh, NY; US 9 in Fishkill, NY; I-684 / US 6 / US 202 / NY 22 in Southeast, NY; US 6 / US 7 / US 202 in Danbury, CT; I-691 / Route 322 in Southington, CT; US 6 in Farmington, CT; I-91 / US 44 in Hartford, CT; I-384 / I-291 / US 44 in Manchester, CT
- East end: I-90 Toll / Mass Pike in Sturbridge, MA

Location
- Country: United States
- States: Pennsylvania, New York, Connecticut, Massachusetts

Highway system
- Interstate Highway System; Main; Auxiliary; Suffixed; Business; Future

Interstate 84 (I-84) is an Interstate Highway in the Northeastern United States that extends almost 233 miles (375 km) from Dunmore, Pennsylvania, near Scranton at an interchange with I-81 east to Sturbridge, Massachusetts, at an interchange with the Massachusetts Turnpike (I-90). Among the major cities that the road passes through is Hartford, Connecticut, and the road provides a major portion of the primary route between New York City and Boston. Another highway named I-84 is located in the Northwestern United States.

== Route description ==
Lengths
	mi	km
PA	54.87	88.30
NY	71.79	115.53
CT	97.90	157.55
MA	8.15	13.12
Total	232.71	374.51

=== Pennsylvania ===
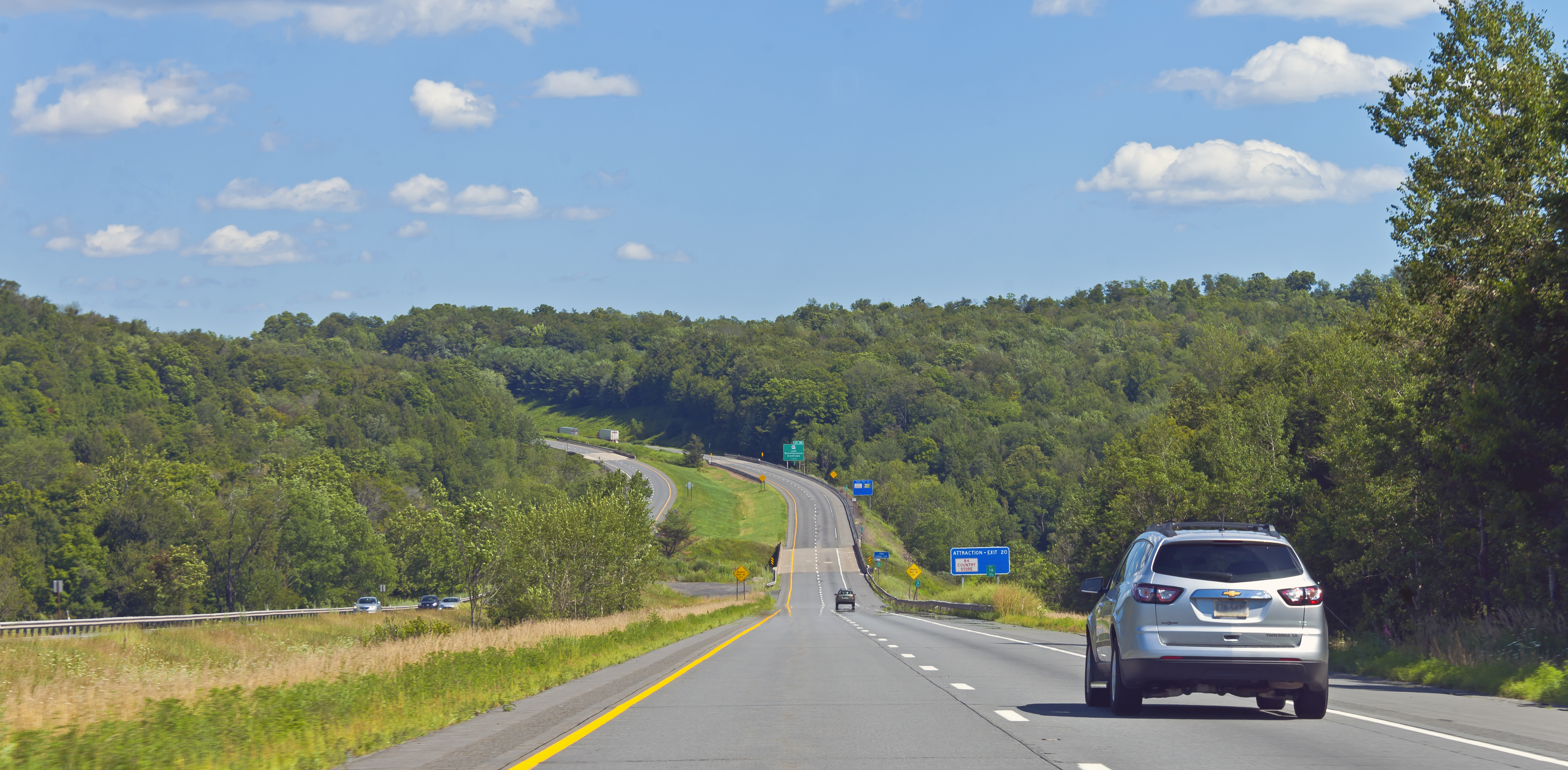
I-84 crossing from Wayne County into Pike County

I-84 starts in Pennsylvania at I-81 in Dunmore, a suburb east of Scranton. After two miles (3.2 km), I-84 interchanges with I-380, with I-380 going southeast through the Pocono Mountains and I-84 continuing almost due east into Wayne and Pike counties. Pennsylvania began replacing sequential exit numbers with mile-based numbers in 2001.

This section of Pennsylvania is very lightly populated, and there are no major settlements on or near I-84, although it offers access to popular outdoor recreation areas such as Lake Wallenpaupack and Promised Land State Park. Its right-of-way is very wide, with a large median strip between the two roadways as it passes through densely wooded country, except for the swampy areas in southern Wayne County. The only development along Pennsylvania's section of I-84 is where US Route 6 (US 6) and US 209 start to parallel closely and form a commercial strip just south of Matamoras, just west of the Delaware River. I-84 reaches its highest elevation in Pennsylvania and in the east just west of exit 8 at 1,800 feet (550 m).

=== New York ===
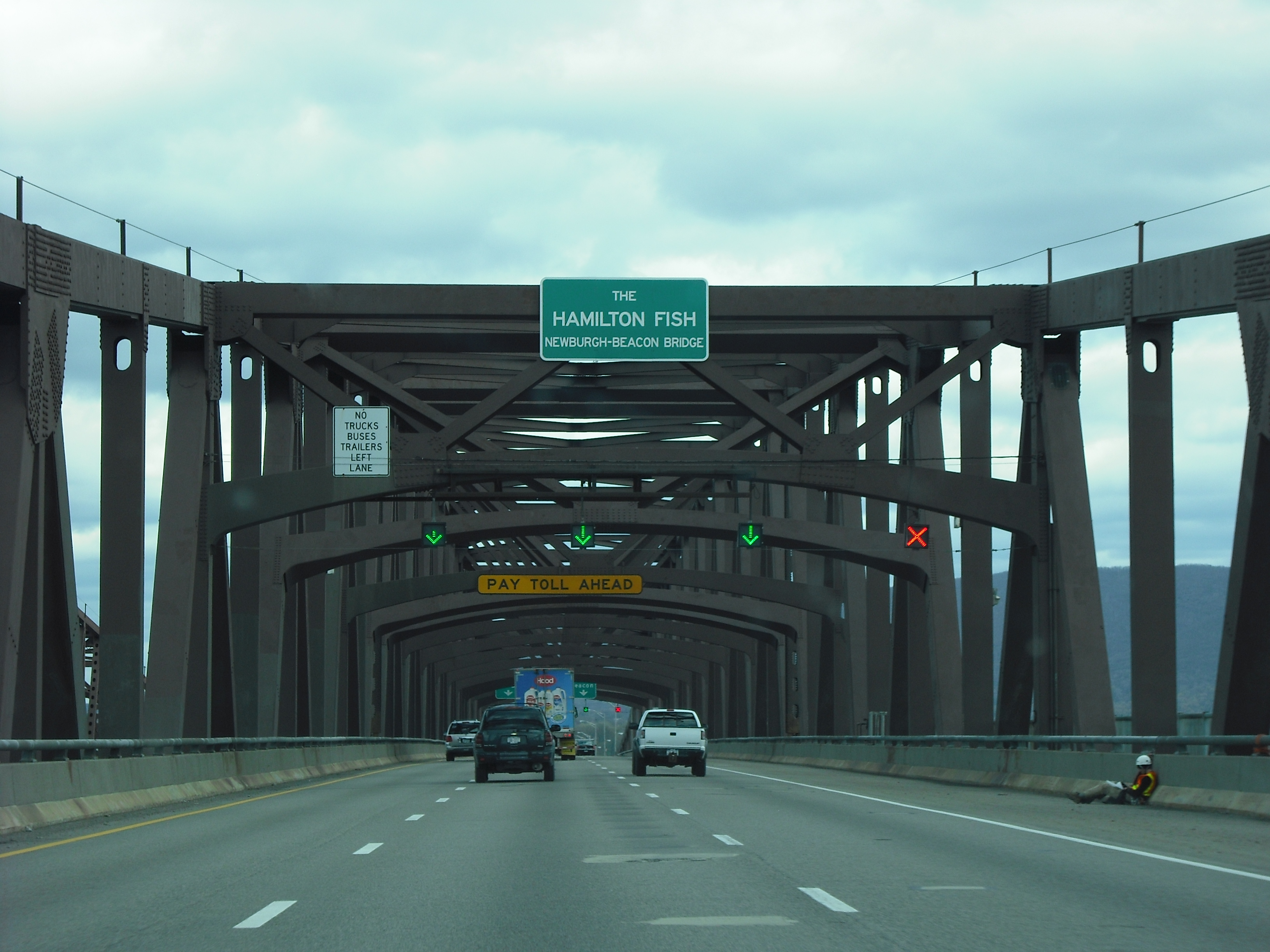
Crossing the Newburgh–Beacon Bridge, eastbound

I-84 enters New York by crossing both the Delaware and Neversink rivers on a long bridge south of Port Jervis, the first large settlement near the highway. South of the road, at the confluence of the Delaware and Neversink rivers, is the Tri-States Monument, where New Jersey, New York, and Pennsylvania converge. The first mile (1.6 km) of the road in New York runs along the New Jersey state line, then curves to the north to climb the Shawangunk Ridge and cross Orange County, where it intersects New York State Route 17 (NY 17; future I-86) and later the New York State Thruway (I-87). I-84 includes the Newburgh–Beacon Bridge across the Hudson River at Newburgh.

East of the bridge and the city of Beacon, I-84 continues to head east across Dutchess County, beginning to turn south in the mountainous areas east of the Taconic State Parkway and into Putnam County. At Brewster, where I-684 heads south toward New York City, the road resumes its eastern course into Connecticut, closely paralleled by US 6 and US 202. The New York State Department of Transportation (NYSDOT) completed the process of converting exits from sequential to mile-based numbering as part of a sign replacement project in 2021.

=== Connecticut ===
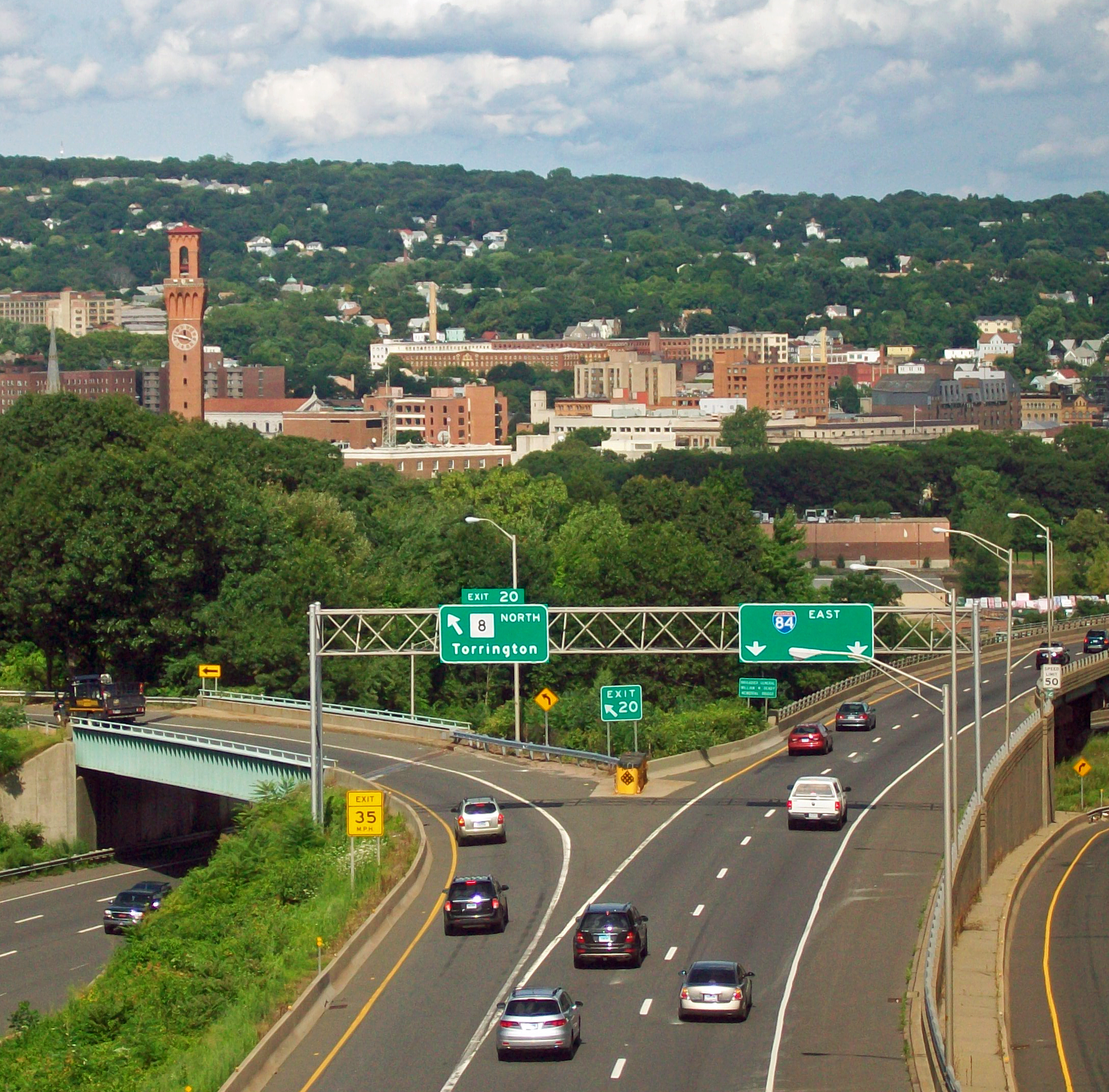
I-84 (looking eastbound) just before becoming an elevated viaduct to cross downtown Waterbury

The Interstate's first exit is at the state line, where it enters the city of Danbury. Here, it is designated the Yankee Expressway. Two miles (3.2 km) to the east, where US 7 comes in from the south near Danbury Fair to join I-84, it turns to the north. At the next exit, US 6 and US 202 join the highway.

The four-way concurrency ends after three miles (4.8 km), when US 7 and US 202 split off north toward New Milford. US 6 leaves the Interstate at the next exit, and I-84 continues east across the countryside. At exit 11, it turns to the northeast and descends to cross the Housatonic River on the Rochambeau Bridge, into New Haven County. It then climbs onto higher ground to the city of Waterbury, which it passes on an elevated viaduct with the eastbound and westbound lanes on different levels. Here, the Route 8 expressway intersects.

The eastern heading continues past Waterbury to Milldale, where I-691 splits off to the east. This section has many left-hand exits and entrances and sharp curves, which were built for a planned network of freeways. I-84 heads northeast toward New Britain and Hartford, the state capital and the largest community along its eastern length. After intersecting I-91, the road crosses the Connecticut River on the Bulkeley Bridge, the oldest on the Interstate System, then becomes the Wilbur Cross Highway and continues toward the northeast. I-84 services the greater student body commuting to the University of Connecticut through exit 68 located in rural Tolland.

The last exit in Connecticut is exit 74, an exit for Route 171. I-84 crosses the Massachusetts border in the town of Union.

=== Massachusetts ===
The Wilbur Cross Highway continues on I-84 after the highway crosses the state line. For a short distance (approximately 90 yards (82 m) eastbound and 200 yards (180 m) westbound), the Interstate passes through the town of Holland in Hampden County before crossing into Sturbridge in Worcester County for the remainder of its length. I-84 has only three exits in Massachusetts, before ending at I-90, the Massachusetts Turnpike. I-84 ends at exit 78 (formerly exit 9) of I-90, which is located in Sturbridge, 7.7 miles (12.4 km) into the state, making the Massachusetts section of the highway the shortest distance within any of the four states it traverses.

== History ==
I-84 was originally to head east from Hartford, Connecticut, to Providence, Rhode Island.

The original route of I-84 would have used present-day I-384 to Bolton, Connecticut, then along a never-built section of freeway that would have connected to the US 6 bypass around Willimantic, Connecticut. Another never-built freeway section would have connected it to I-395 and extended I-84 onto State Road 695 (SR 695) in Connecticut, the easternmost portion of the Connecticut Turnpike in Plainfield, Connecticut. From there, it would have roughly followed US 6 through western Rhode Island to connect to the present-day US 6 freeway in Johnston. From there, a freeway from Olneyville Square to the I-95/I-195 interchange was briefly considered but abandoned in favor of what later became the Route 6-10 Connector.

Sections of I-84 in Connecticut were reconstructed and widened in the 1980s. The former I-86 portion from East Hartford to the Massachusetts state line was completely rebuilt from a narrow four-lane freeway to a much wider profile ranging from six lanes at the Massachusetts state line, expanding to eight lanes in Vernon, to 12 lanes with high-occupancy vehicle lanes (HOV lanes) in East Hartford. Another section through Danbury was widened from four lanes to six lanes in 1985 and 1986. Widening of the highway through Danbury was funded by Union Carbide as part of building its world headquarters in Danbury.

Though the route was confirmed in Connecticut, many issues remained in Rhode Island, the biggest of which were major environmental concerns about how the freeway would affect the Scituate Reservoir, which is the main drinking water supply for Providence. In an attempt to ease environmental concerns, an alternate route was briefly studied in Rhode Island that would have connected I-84 to the present-day Route 37 freeway. This would have allowed construction of I-84 south of the Scituate Reservoir. Major community opposition caused this plan, as well as all plans for a Hartford–Providence expressway, to be scrapped in the 1980s.

In the 1992 long-range transportation plan released by the Rhode Island Department of Transportation, a freeway was added along the original route of I-84 that will connect to the SR 695 freeway on the Rhode Island–Connecticut border.

=== I-86 relation ===
Interstate 86
- Location: East Hartford, Connecticut–Sturbridge, Massachusetts
- Length: 38.97 mi (62.72 km)
- Existed: 1968–1984
- History: Redesignated as I-84 in 1984

The section of I-84 between East Hartford, Connecticut, (at the present-day junction with I-384) and Sturbridge, Massachusetts, (I-90) was signed in the late 1970s and early 1980s as I-86 (unrelated to present-day I-86 in New York and Pennsylvania). Signs stating "I-84 Ends, I-86 to Boston" (eastbound) and "I-86 Ends, I-84 to Hartford" (westbound) were posted where the change took place. Exit numbering on I-86 was that of the road's predecessor, Route 15, in a sequence beginning on New York's Hutchinson River Parkway. Exits were renumbered to correspond with the rest of I-84 in Connecticut when the road was redesignated in 1984. The present I-384 as well as the present US 6 bypass near Willimantic, both of which were a part of what was then I-84's planned easterly continuation, were also numbered I-84 prior to 1984 even though they lacked any direct connection to the rest of I-84 at that time. (Drivers had to use Silver Lane in East Hartford to travel between the two stretches of the highway.) These two sections were re-numbered I-384 and US 6 when what was then I-86 numbering reverted to I-84, with signs reading "I-84 is now I-384", "I-84 is now US 6", and "I-86 is now I-84" being erected on their respective segments.

=== Tolls ===
As I-84 was built with federal funds, there are generally no highway tolls. The exception is I-84's Hudson River crossing, the Newburgh–Beacon Bridge. Since the bridge is under the New York State Bridge Authority, it carries an eastbound-only toll of $2.15 for passenger vehicles (EZ Pass $1.65).

==== Transfer to New York State Thruway Authority ====
From 1992 through 2006, I-84 in New York was a toll-free component of the New York State Thruway system. It was transferred by NYSDOT to the New York State Thruway Authority (NYSTA) in order to capitalize on that agency's steady revenue stream from upstate sources.

In 1992, maintenance responsibility for I-84 in New York was transferred to the NYSTA and the monies for that purpose came from existing tolls on I-190 in downtown Buffalo, more than 300 miles (480 km) away. On October 30, 2006, the NYSTA began the process of returning maintenance and operation responsibilities to NYSDOT and the tolls in Buffalo were discontinued. The I-190 tolls were considered to be one of the principal causes of highway congestion in Buffalo. From 2006 to 2010, maintenance was performed by the NYSTA with funding provided by the state legislature. On October 11, 2010, NYSDOT resumed full control of I-84.

=== Widening projects in Waterbury ===
A widening project along the congested stretch of I-84 through Waterbury and Cheshire, Connecticut, was beset by cost overruns, delays, and construction defects involving storm drains, as state and federal officials have launched criminal investigations stemming from this project. This episode diminished local enthusiasm for a proposed $2-billion reconstruction of the "Mixmaster" interchange in downtown Waterbury between Route 8 and I-84. Cost estimates for the Mixmaster replacement have increased to $3 billion. Former Connecticut Attorney-General Richard Blumenthal began a lawsuit against the contractor and an engineering firm in response to threats from USDOT to withhold funds from the project. On May 18, 2007, the Republican-American reported this area had defective light poles, while Governor Jodi Rell released an audit report of the construction disaster. A number of USDOT personnel were either fired or reprimanded following the scandal. Additionally, the Federal Bureau of Investigation (FBI) and a federal grand jury investigated the now-defunct construction company and the same USDOT officials, although none of these investigations have yet to result in criminal charges.

== Major intersections ==
Pennsylvania
I-81 / US 6 in Dunmore
I-380 in Roaring Brook Township
US 6 near Milford
US 6 / US 209 near Matamoras
New York
US 6 / Route 23 in Port Jervis
US 6 / NY 17M in Middletown
NY 17 in Middletown
I-87 Toll / New York Thruway / NY 300 in Newburgh
US 9W / NY 32 in Newburgh
US 9 in Fishkill
Taconic State Parkway in East Fishkill
I-684 / NY 22 / US 6 / US 202 in Brewster
Connecticut
US 6 / US 7 / US 202 in Danbury
Route 8 in Waterbury
I-691 / Route 322 in Southington
Route 72 in New Britain
US 6 in Farmington
Route 9 in Farmington
I-91 / US 44 in Hartford
Route 2 / US 5 / US 44 in East Hartford
Route 15 in East Hartford
I-384 in Manchester
US 6 / US 44 in Manchester
I-291 in Manchester
Massachusetts
US 20 in Sturbridge
I-90 / Mass Pike in Sturbridge

== Auxiliary routes ==
I-84 has two current and two former auxiliary routes. I-384 is a spur of I-84 in Manchester, Connecticut. I-684 connects I-84 in Brewster, New York, with I-287 in Harrison, New York. I-284 was a planned but never built expressway relocation of US 5 to bypass East Hartford, Connecticut, along the eastern shore of the Connecticut River. I-484 was slated to be built south of downtown Hartford, Connecticut, (connecting with I-91), but that highway was never completed.

== See also ==
- Business routes of Interstate 84
