= Manchester (CDP), Connecticut =

Census-designated place in Connecticut, United States

Manchester, Connecticut
- Census-designated place
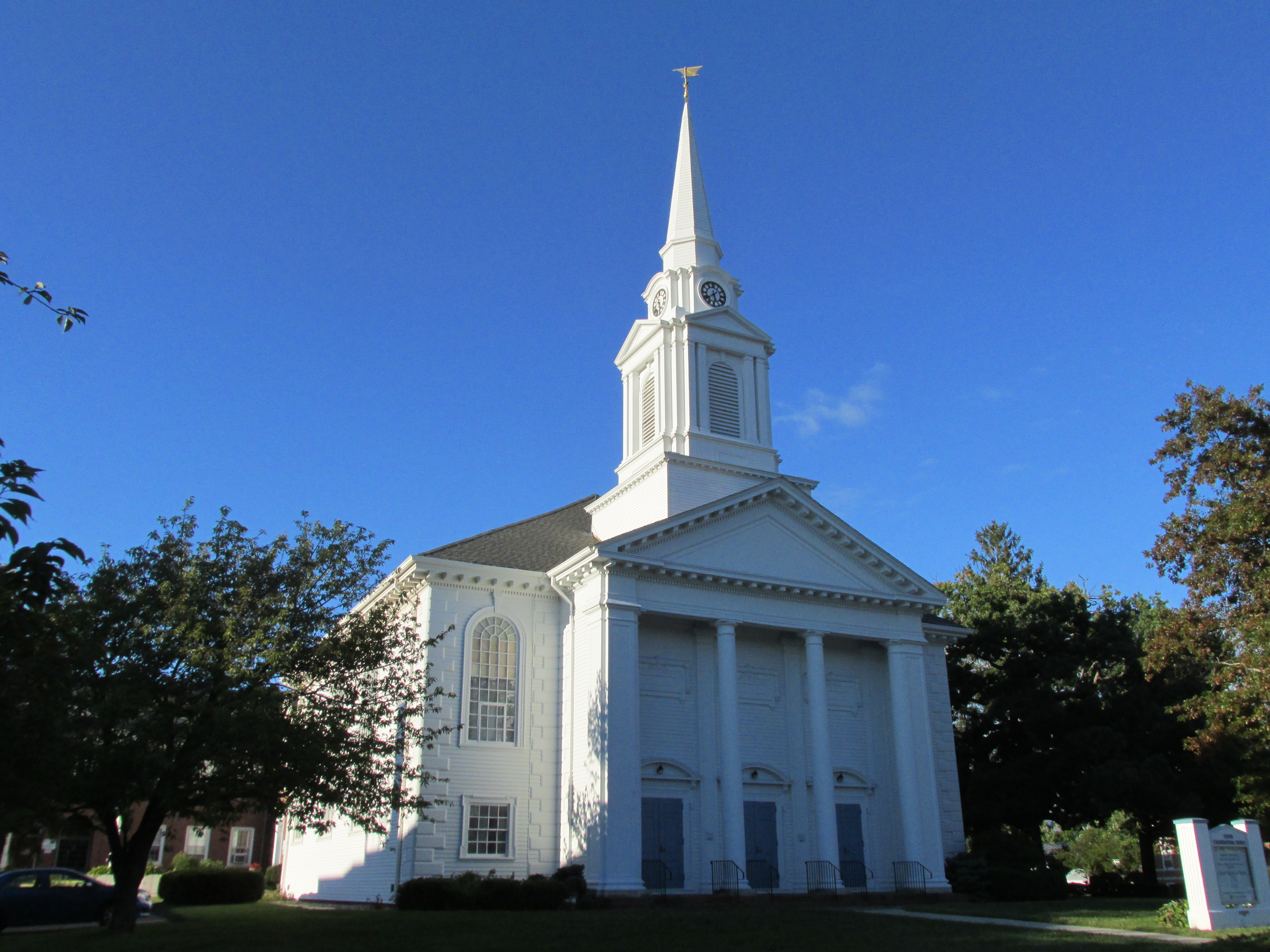
- Center Congregational Church

- Location in Connecticut Location in the United States
- Coordinates: 41°46′33″N 72°31′18″W
- State: Connecticut
- County: Hartford
- Town: Manchester

Area
  - Total: 6.50 sq mi (16.83 km^{2})
  - Land: 6.46 sq mi (16.74 km^{2})
  - Water: 0.035 sq mi (0.09 km^{2})
- Elevation: 272 ft (83 m)

Population (2010)
  - Total: 30,577
  - Density: 4,731/sq mi (1,826.7/km^{2})
- ZIP codes: 06040, 06042
- FIPS code: 09-44690
- GNIS feature ID: 2378342

Manchester is a census-designated place (CDP) in Hartford County, Connecticut, United States, comprising the urban center of the town of Manchester. As of the 2010 census, the population of the CDP was 30,577, out of 58,241 in the entire town.

== Geography ==
The Manchester CDP occupies the central part of the town of Manchester and extends east to the town boundary with Bolton. The northern edge of the CDP primarily follows Lydall Street, Woodbridge Street, and Woodland Street. The CDP extends west as far as New State Road, Love Lane, and Olcott Street, and the southern edge of the CDP follows Hartford Road, Charter Oak Street, and Oak Grove Street. The easternmost part of the CDP is bordered to the south by U.S. Routes 6 and 44, from Pitkin Street to the Bolton town line.

U.S. Routes 6 and 44 run together through the center of Manchester as Center Street and exit the community to the east as Middle Turnpike and New Bolton Road. Both highways lead west 8 miles (13 km) to Hartford, the state capital. To the east, US 6 leads 18 miles (29 km) to Willimantic, while US 44 leads 15 miles (24 km) to Storrs. Interstate 384 passes just south of the Manchester CDP, with access from Exits 1 through 5. Route 83 passes through the center of Manchester as Main Street, leading north 2.5 miles (4.0 km) to Interstate 84 in the northern corner of the town of Manchester and south 7 miles (11 km) to the Route 2 freeway in East Glastonbury.

According to the U.S. Census Bureau, the Manchester CDP has an area of 6.5 square miles (16.8 km^{2}), of which 0.03 square miles (0.09 km^{2}), or 0.56%, is water. The CDP drains west to the Hockanum River, a tributary of the Connecticut River.

== Demographics ==
As of the census of 2010, there were 30,577 people, 12,898 households, and 7,458 families residing in the CDP. The population density was 4,731 inhabitants per square mile (1,827 inhabitants/km^{2}). There were 13,691 housing units, of which 793, or 5.8%, were vacant. The racial makeup of the CDP was 72.3% White, 13.6% African American, 0.4% Native American or Alaska Native, 4.2% Asian, 0.03% Native Hawaiian or Pacific Islander, 5.6% some other race, and 3.9% from two or more races. Hispanic or Latino of any race were 14.7% of the population.

Of the 12,898 households in the community, 28.9% had children under the age of 18 living with them, 36.2% were headed by married couples living together, 16.4% had a female householder with no husband present, and 42.2% were non-families. 33.1% of all households were made up of individuals, and 10.4% were someone living alone who was 65 years of age or older. The average household size was 2.34, and the average family size was 3.02.

21.9% of the CDP population were under the age of 18, 9.5% were from 18 to 24, 30.2% were from 25 to 44, 26.1% were from 45 to 64, and 12.5% were 65 years of age or older. The median age was 36.4 years. For every 100 females, there were 91.9 males. For every 100 females age 18 and over, there were 88.5 males.

For the period 2013–17, the estimated median annual income for a household in the CDP was $56,339, and the median income for a family was $65,134. The per capita income was $29,092. Male full-time workers had a median income of $47,752 versus $45,350 for females. About 11.2% of families and 13.4% of the population were living below the poverty line, including 18.5% of those under age 18 and 8.1% of those age 65 and over.
