= Interstate 384 =

Highway in Connecticut

Interstate 384
- State Trooper Russell A. Bagshaw Highway
- I-384 highlighted in red

Route information
- Auxiliary route of I-84
- Maintained by CTDOT
- Length: 8.2 mi (13.2 km)
- Existed: 1984–present
- NHS: Entire route

Major junctions
- West end: I-84 / US 6 in East Hartford
- East end: US 6 / US 44 in Bolton

Location
- Country: United States
- State: Connecticut
- Counties: Hartford, Tolland

Highway system
- Interstate Highway System; Main; Auxiliary; Suffixed; Business; Future; Connecticut State Highway System; Interstate; US; State; SSR; SR; Scenic
← Route 372	→ I-395

Interstate 384 (I-384) is an auxiliary Interstate Highway located entirely within the state of Connecticut. It runs 8.2 miles (13.2 km) east to west, from I-84 in East Hartford to US 6/US 44 in Bolton.

== Route description ==
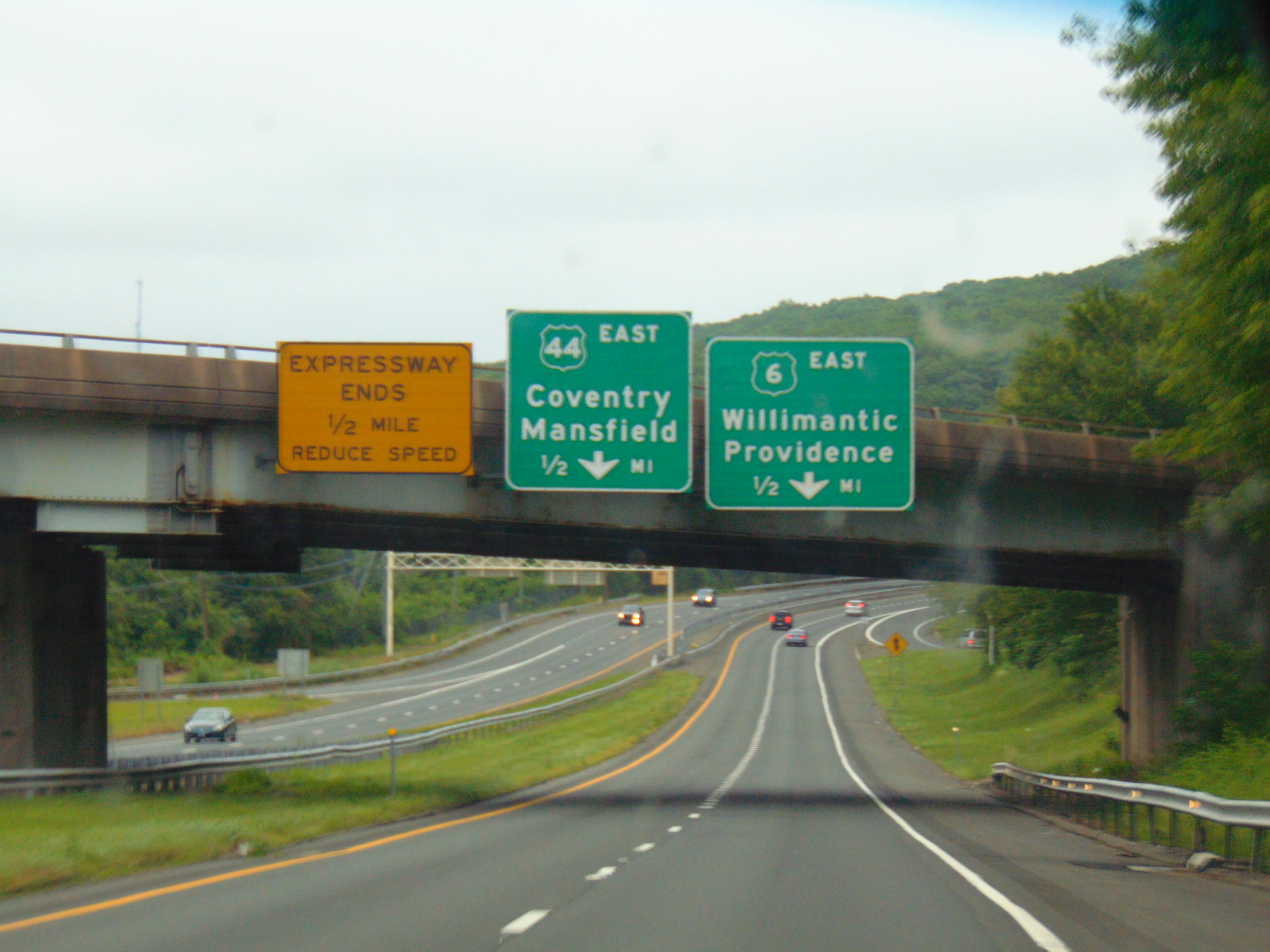
I-384 at US 6 and US 44, its eastern end

I-384 officially begins at I-84 eastbound exit 59 at the East Hartford–Manchester town line, as the right two lanes of traffic split from the I-84 mainline. The highway can also be accessed from the I-84 eastbound high-occupancy vehicle lane (HOV lane), and westbound I-384 traffic can also access the HOV lane on westbound I-84. Westbound I-84 access to I-384 is provided through a complex interchange that also provides access from Pleasant Valley Road near The Shoppes at Buckland Hills and from I-291. I-384's first exit is for Spencer Street. The eastbound ramp is on the I-384 mainline, while the westbound ramp comes from a split in the I-84 interchange ramp. Just east of the Spencer Street overpass, the ramp from westbound I-84 joins the I-384 mainline and the HOV lane becomes a conventional lane. I-384 continues along the southern part of Manchester. It has one interchange before it intersects Route 83, which provides access to Manchester Center. After one more interchange in Manchester, it crosses into Bolton, where it has a partial interchange with Route 85. Shortly after the interchange, I-384 ends as it meets the US 6/US 44 concurrency just west of its eastern split at Bolton Notch.

The highway is eight lanes wide west of Route 83, six lanes wide to Route 85, and four lanes wide for the rest of the highway's duration.

== Special designations ==
Since May 31, 1996, the segment of I-384 "running from the junction of Interstate Route 84 in Manchester in a general easterly direction to Route 6 in Bolton" has been officially known as the State Trooper Russell A. Bagshaw Highway, in memory of a Connecticut State Police trooper who was killed in the line of duty in 1991.

== History ==
Prior to 1984, I-384 was designated I-84. During that time, current I-84 east of the East Hartford junction was I-86. Originally, the expressway was supposed to end in Johnston, Rhode Island, at the I-95/I-195 connector (now the Route 6-10 Connector). The freeway was built to Bolton where it abruptly ends at the intersection with US 6 and US 44. A 5.7-mile (9.2 km) segment from Columbia to Windham was also built, forming the present-day US 6 bypass around Willimantic, and would have connected to the Connecticut Turnpike at what is now I-395 exit 35, following the last few miles of the turnpike into Rhode Island.

Crossing into Rhode Island, the proposed I-84 expressway was to parallel US 6 to I-295, where it would have tied into the existing US 6/Rhode Island Route 10 freeway. In 1982, Rhode Island canceled their plans because of community backlash and possible impacts to the Scituate Reservoir. In 1986, Connecticut canceled their plans and changed I-86 back to I-84 and I-84 was renumbered I-384. Even after cancelling I-84, various proposals were made to complete the highway between Bolton and the Willimantic bypass or between the bypass and I-395.

== Future ==
For more than 30 years since the cancelation of the Hartford–Providence leg of I-84, elected officials in Connecticut proposed to extend I-384 from Bolton to Willimantic along the US 6 corridor, connecting the existing I-384 with the US 6 Windham Bypass, which would have likely included an extension of the I-384 designation to include the new expressway and the Windham Bypass. The corresponding stretch of US 6 is known as "Suicide 6" because of sharp turns and intersections had been the site of numerous fatal accidents and was the main reason supporting construction of the bypass. It is unlikely the 11-mile (18 km) expressway between I-384 and the Windham Bypass will ever be built because of irresolvable disagreements over the routing of the expressway: state and local officials prefer more northerly alignment that minimizes disruption to developed areas along US 6, while federal officials insist on a more southerly alignment that minimizes environmental impacts to the Hop River ecosystem. After studying more than 200 potential alignments with no agreement among stakeholders, the Connecticut Department of Transportation (CTDOT) abandoned further study of the US 6 expressway in 2005 and instead focused on completing safety upgrades on the existing US 6 corridor between Bolton and Willimantic to reduce congestion and accidents.

A proposed extension of the CTfastrak bus rapid transit line would run in the HOV lanes in I-84 and I-384.

== Exit list ==
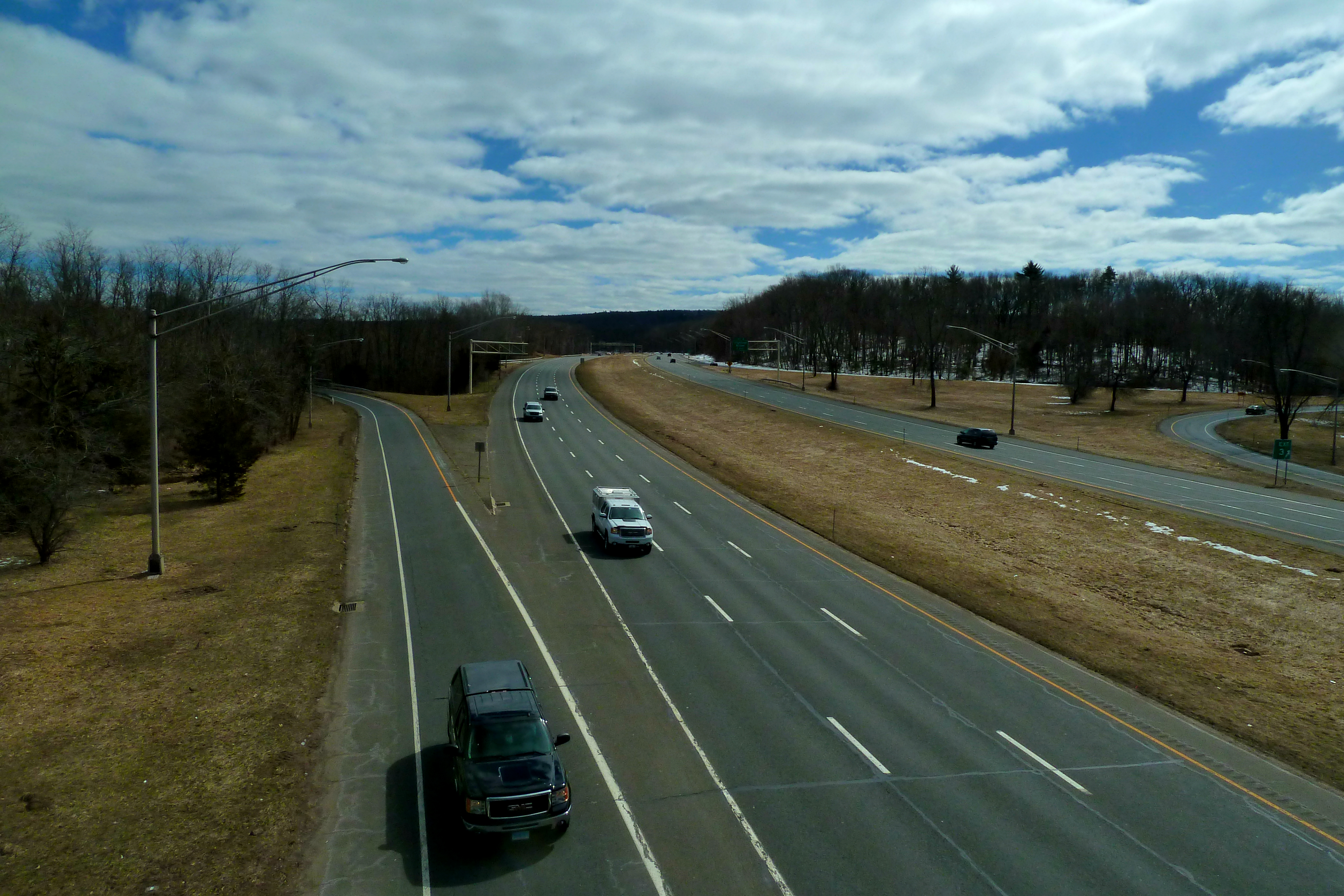
I-384 looking east from exit 3

County	Location	mi	km	Old exit	New exit	Destinations	Notes
Hartford	East Hartford	0.00	0.00	–	–	I-84 west (US 6 west) – Hartford	Western terminus; former Route 15
Hartford	Manchester	0.77	1.24	–	1A	I-84 east to I-291 west – Boston, Windsor	Westbound exit and eastbound entrance; exit 67 on I-84
Hartford	Manchester	1.23	1.98	1	1B	Spencer Street / Silver Lane (SR 502)	Signed as exit 1 eastbound
Hartford	Manchester	2.78	4.47	2	3	Keeney Street / Hartford Road	
Hartford	Manchester	4.17	6.71	3	4	Route 83 – Downtown Manchester, Glastonbury	
Hartford	Manchester	5.44	8.75	4	5	Highland Street (SR 534)	
Tolland	Bolton	7.36	11.84	5	7	Route 85 – Bolton, Colchester	Eastbound exit and westbound entrance
Tolland	Bolton	8.4	13.5	--	8	US 6 west / US 44 west – Bolton	Westbound exit only.
Tolland	Bolton	8.53	13.73	–	--	US 6 east / US 44 east – Coventry, Mansfield, Willimantic, Providence	Eastern terminus
1.000 mi = 1.609 km; 1.000 km = 0.621 mi: HOV only; Incomplete access
