= Conland–Whitehead Highway =

Highway in Hartford, Connecticut, US

- Conland–Whitehead Highway highlighted in red

Route information
- Maintained by ConnDOT
- Length: 0.67 mi (1,080 m)
- Existed: 1945–present
- Component highways: SR 598 (unsigned) entire length

Major junctions
- West end: Pulaski Circle in Hartford
- East end: I-91 in Hartford

Location
- Country: United States
- State: Connecticut
- Counties: Hartford

Highway system
- Connecticut State Highway System; Interstate; US; State; SSR; SR; Scenic
← SR 597	→ SR 600
← I-395	I-484	→ I-491

The Whitehead Highway (also known as the Conland–Whitehead Highway, and frequently misspelled as Conlin–Whitehead Highway), is a 0.67-mile-long (1.08 km) freeway in Hartford, Connecticut running from Pulaski Circle east to Interstate 91 (I-91). Constructed above the Park River Conduit, the highway underwent rehabilitation from 2004 to 2005.

== Route description ==
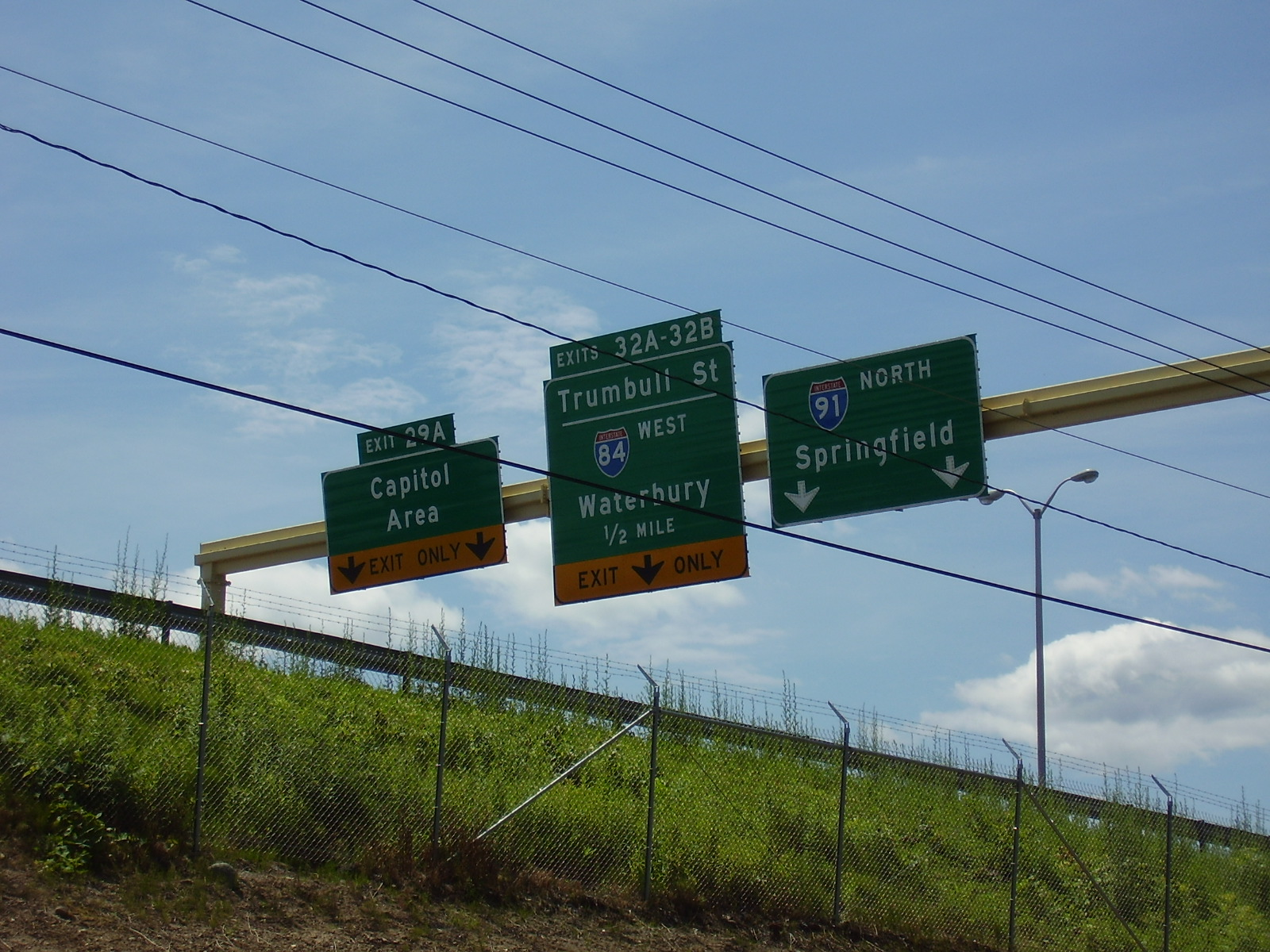
Signage on I-91 for the Whitehead Highway

It is signed as "Exit 29A – Capitol Area" on I-91 and has the unsigned designation of State Road 598 (SR 598). There are two intermediate exits (at Columbus Boulevard and Prospect Street) from the highway before its western terminus at Pulaski Circle.

== History ==
The highway opened in 1945 and was initially named for Henry F. Conland, publisher of the Hartford Courant and chair of a city bridge commission. That December, it was renamed after Ulmont I. "Monty" Whitehead Jr., the first resident of Hartford to die in World War II. Whitehead, a 1933 graduate of Bulkeley High School in Hartford, graduated in 1940 from the U.S. Naval Academy, where he starred in football. On December 7, 1941, Whitehead was serving at Pearl Harbor on the battleship U.S.S. Arizona, which blew up and sank in the opening minutes of the Japanese attack, killing Whitehead and 1,176 other sailors. The name is frequently misspelled – even by the Connecticut Department of Transportation – as "Conlin Whitehead Highway".

Whitehead Highway was originally to be part of Interstate 484, an auxiliary route of I-84. The highway was to be upgraded via straightening and bridge improvements and brought through a short tunnel under the state capitol to connect to I-84 at exit 48. This would have reduced the traffic load at the intersection of I-91 and I-84 in downtown Hartford. Today, the role of redirecting traffic from I-91 to I-84 is handled by I-691, which serves as a southern bypass of Hartford. The extension, first proposed in 1968, was cancelled in 1983 due to local opposition and a lack of funding. The route was never signed as I-484.

== Exit list ==
The entire route is in Hartford, Hartford County. All exits are unnumbered.

mi	km	Destinations	Notes
0.76	1.22	Pulaski Circle	Western terminus
0.60	0.97	Prospect Street / Arch Street to Main Street	Westbound exit and eastbound entrance
0.46	0.74	Columbus Boulevard – Connecticut Convention Center	Westbound exit and eastbound entrance
0.00	0.00	I-91 – New Haven, Springfield, Bradley International Airport	Eastern terminus; exit 37 on I-91
1.000 mi = 1.609 km; 1.000 km = 0.621 mi: Incomplete access
