= Talcottville Historic District =

Historic district in Connecticut, United States

- U.S. National Register of Historic Places
- U.S. Historic district
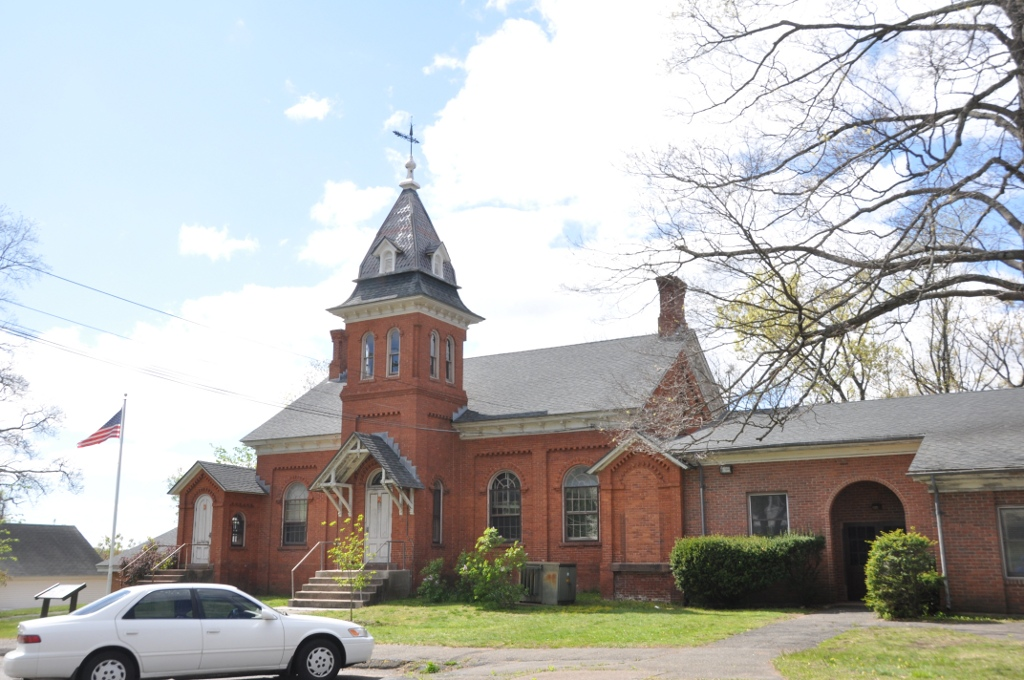
- The Talcott Brothers School (c. 1880)

- Location within Connecticut Location within the United States
- Location: 13-44 Elm Hill Road, and 11-132 Main Street, Vernon, Connecticut
- Coordinates: 41°49′12″N 72°29′51″W
- Area: 92 acres (37 ha)
- Architect: Kellogg, Nathaniel O.; Et al.
- Architectural style: Greek Revival, Italianate, Lenticular truss bridge
- NRHP reference No.: 88002959
- Added to NRHP: January 5, 1989

The Talcottville Historic District is a historic district in the town of Vernon, Connecticut. Centered on Elm Hill Road and Main Street, it encompasses a 19th-century mill village, including archaeological remnants of very early cotton-spinning facilities, an old stone dam, and a major wood-frame mill constructed by the Talcott brothers. Also included in the village are a significant number of mill worker housing units, many dating to the middle decades of the 19th century, and an 1891 lenticular pony truss bridge, built by the Berlin Iron Bridge Company. The district was listed on the National Register of Historic Places in 1989.

== Description and history ==
The village of Talcottville was established in 1802 by John Warburton, an English immigrant who was partly responsible for introducing mechanized cotton textile production into Connecticut. Warburton purchased land along the Tankerhoosen River in what was then part of Bolton and is now in southwestern Vernon, and built a dam and cotton mill, as well as a dwelling that still stands. His mill was the first financially successful cotton mill in the state. A second mill, of which only archaeological remains survive, was also built by Warburton in partnership with Peter Dobson at another mill privilege further upstream. The mill complex was acquired in 1856, by brothers Charles and Horace Talcott, and it is under their oversight that the village achieved its greatest extent. The surviving wood-frame mill building was built in 1870, after the early Warburton mill was destroyed by fire. The Talcotts established a paternalistic company village, building houses for their workers, as well as a school and other facilities. The mills were finally shut down in 1940.

The stretch of Main Street on which the mill village is centered was historically a major through road, which was first bypassed by the present alignment of Connecticut Route 83, and then truncated by the major construction work in the 1980s widening Interstate 84. The district's principal features extend along Main Street from CT 83 to where the road crosses the Tankerhoosen River (on a late 19th-century lenticular truss bridge built by the Berlin Iron Bridge Company). The mill complex is located between Main Street and the river, with the principally residential surviving elements of the Talcott's constructions on Main Street and Elm Hill Road. The district includes 32 historically significant buildings, as well as the dams, mill sites, and mill ponds associated with the Warburton, Dobson, and Talcott mills.

== See also ==
- National Register of Historic Places listings in Tolland County, Connecticut
