= U.S. Route 6 in Connecticut =

Segment of American highway

U.S. Route 6
- Grand Army of the Republic Highway
- US 6 highlighted in red

Route information
- Maintained by CTDOT
- Length: 116.33 mi (187.21 km)
- Existed: 1926–present

Major junctions
- West end: US 6 / US 202 at the New York state line in Danbury
- I-84 / US 7 in Danbury; Route 8 / Route 254 in Thomaston; I-84 in Farmington; I-91 / US 44 in Hartford; Route 2 in East Hartford; Route 15 in East Hartford; I-84 / I-291 / US 44 in Manchester; I-384 in Bolton; Route 12 in Killingly; I-395 in Killingly
- East end: US 6 at the Rhode Island state line in Killingly

Location
- Country: United States
- State: Connecticut
- Counties: Fairfield, New Haven, Litchfield, Hartford, Tolland, Windham

Highway system
- United States Numbered Highway System; List; Special; Divided; Connecticut State Highway System; Interstate; US; State; SSR; SR; Scenic
← US 5	→ US 7

U.S. Route 6 (US 6) within the state of Connecticut runs for 116.33 miles (187.21 km) from the New York state line near Danbury to the Rhode Island state line in Killingly. West of Hartford, the route either closely parallels or runs along Interstate 84 (I-84), which has largely supplanted US 6 as a through route in western Connecticut. East of Hartford, US 6 serves as a primary route for travel between Hartford and Providence.

== Route description ==
=== Western Connecticut ===
US 6 enters Connecticut paired with US 202 from the town of Southeast, New York, just east of the village of Brewster. The concurrency runs for 3.8 miles (6.1 km) through the city of Danbury as a minor arterial road before it forms a 3.3-mile (5.3 km) four-way concurrency with I-84 and US 7 from I-84 exit 4 to exit 7. At exit 7, US 7 and US 202 split to the north, while US 6 stays duplexed with I-84 for another 0.8 miles (1.3 km) before returning to surface roads at exit 8. The route then goes through the towns of Bethel and Newtown. In Newtown, it has a 2.8-mile (4.5 km) concurrency with Route 25 before turning east toward the village of Sandy Hook, where it enters I-84 once again for 6.4 miles (10.3 km) between Newtown and Southbury (from exits 10 to 15).

After exiting I-84 in Southbury, US 6 once again becomes a surface road and is duplexed with Route 67 for 2.7 miles (4.3 km). It then passes through the northern Waterbury area suburbs of Woodbury, Watertown, and Thomaston. US 6 has a one-mile (1.6 km) overlap with the Route 8 freeway in Thomaston.

=== Hartford area ===
After leaving the Route 8 freeway, US 6 continues as an alternating two- and four-lane surface road through the towns of Plymouth, Bristol, and Farmington. In Farmington, it once again joins I-84 at exit 38 for 13.4 miles (21.6 km), passing through West Hartford, Hartford, and East Hartford. US 44 joins for 0.25 miles (0.40 km) to cross the Connecticut River on the Bulkeley Bridge from Hartford to East Hartford toward Bolton just past the eastern terminus of I-384.

=== Eastern Connecticut ===
In Bolton, US 6 and US 44 split. US 44 follows a more northerly route while US 6 continues through Bolton, Coventry, Andover, and Columbia. It intersects with Route 316 and Route 87 along the way and mostly follows the Hop River.

The US 6 Willimantic bypass begins in Columbia, at a four-way at-grade intersection with Route 66. The freeway starts out heading northeast and immediately crosses into Coventry. After crossing the town line, the eastbound and westbound sides of US 6 split, with a hill in between them. At the split, the eastbound side of the freeway curves and heads east. At this point, Hop River State Park Trail passes under both sides of the freeway. Soon after, the westbound lane also curves, and the two sides of the freeway soon become parallel again. The freeway then passes over Flanders River Road about 0.25 miles (0.40 km) east. The freeway then crosses the Willimantic River and enters the town of Windham. Right after entering Windham, it overpasses the New England Central Railroad. Immediately after this, there is an interchange with Route 32. After the interchange, the freeway enters Mansfield and passes under Mansfield Avenue before encountering another interchange for Route 195. The eastbound exit and westbound entrance use Mansfield City Road, while the westbound exit accesses Route 195 via North Frontage Road and eastbound access to US 6 is from Route 195 itself. Soon after the eastbound entrance ramp joins US 6, the freeway crosses the Natchaug River and once again enters Windham. The US 6 Willimantic bypass ends 0.5 miles (0.80 km) after entering Windham at an interchange with the eastern end of Route 66, whose roadway US 6 assumes east of the interchange. US 6 then continues as a surface road through the towns of Chaplin, Hampton, and Brooklyn. In Killingly, US 6 becomes an expressway in the vicinity of its junction with I-395 in Killingly, part of which (0.34 mi or 0.55 km) is duplexed with Route 12, before reverting to a two-lane surface road. Just before the Rhode Island state line, SR 695, the unsigned portion of the Connecticut Turnpike, merges into US 6 eastbound as it enters the town of Foster.

== History ==

Before the creation of the U.S. Numbered Highway System in 1926, most of the proposed routing in Connecticut was part of New England Route 3 (Route 3). There were two places where Route 3 and US 6 were not overlapped. Route 3 began in Bedford, New York, at New York State Route 22, entering Connecticut via modern Route 35. Route 3 continued north to Danbury via the old non-expressway alignment of US 7. US 6, on the other hand, went east from Brewster on its current alignment, meeting with Route 3 in downtown Danbury.

Another difference in routing is between Manchester and Windham. US 6 originally used a more northern alignment via Coventry, running along present US 44 then modern Route 31. Route 3 used current US 6 for its routing. East of Windham, the routes overlapped into Rhode Island. Between 1926 and 1932, Route 3 and US 6 were cosigned where they overlapped. Route 3 was finally deleted in 1932.

=== Willimantic bypass ===
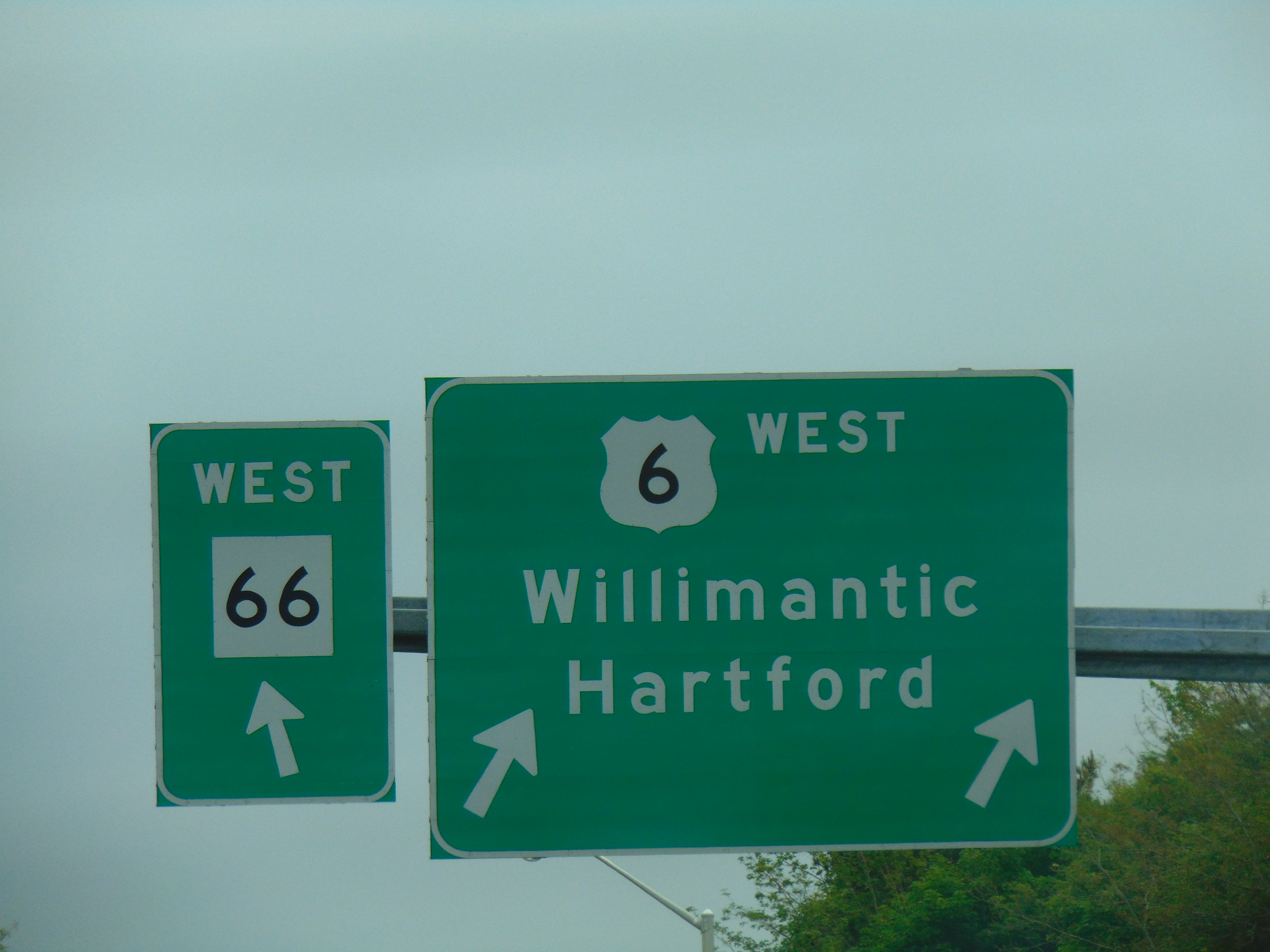
The sign at the start of the bypass in North Windham

I-84 was to be an expressway that would connect the modern I-384 with the modern US 6 Willimantic bypass. From here, I-84 would continue to Providence, Rhode Island. This idea was planned in the 1960s but abandoned in 2005.

The Connecticut Department of Transportation (CTDOT) had planned since the 1960s to upgrade the segment between Bolton and Columbia to an expressway, connecting I-384 to the existing expressway segment in Windham. However, this particular segment of US 6 passes through an environmentally sensitive area centered around the Hop River. Construction had been planned to begin in the late 1980s, but federal, state, and local officials could not reach an agreement on a feasible route that avoided the Hop River wetlands and development within the towns of Andover, Bolton, Coventry, and Columbia. The affected towns, CTDOT, and the Connecticut Department of Environmental Protection (DEP) favored a northern alignment (Alternative 133B), which would avoid the town centers and nearby wetlands. The Environmental Protection Agency, U.S. Army Corps of Engineers (USACE), and Federal Highway Administration (FHWA) favored a southerly alignment (Alternative 133 18/25) that would cut through residential and commercial areas as well as the Hop River's adjoining wetlands.

Despite opposition from CTDOT, DEP, and affected towns, the FHWA issued a record of decision and USACE issued required permits for Alternative 133 18/25 (southern alignment) in 2001. State and local officials continued to press USACE to approve the northern alignment. Due to the impasse between state, local, and federal officials, federal funds for the bypass were withdrawn in 2003. In 2005, the Capitol Region Council of Governments and CTDOT removed the US 6 bypass from planning, hence CTDOT effectively abandoned further study of the bypass in lieu of upgrading the existing road.

In 2007, CTDOT began making safety improvements and capacity upgrades to the existing US 6 through Andover, Bolton, and Columbia.

== Junction list ==
County	Location	mi	km	Old exit	New exit	Destinations	Notes
Fairfield	Danbury	0.00	0.00			US 6 west / US 202 west	Continuation into New York
Fairfield	Danbury	0.1	0.16			I-84 – Newburgh, Waterbury	Access via Saw Mill Road; exit 1 on I-84
Fairfield	Danbury	1.03	1.66			I-84 – Newburgh, Waterbury	Access via SR 824; exit 2B on I-84
Fairfield	Danbury	4.15	6.68	Western end of freeway section			
Fairfield	Danbury	4.15	6.68		4	I-84 / US 7 north / Lake Avenue – Newburgh, Waterbury, New Milford	Western end of I-84/US 7 concurrency; no westbound access via US 7 northbound; eastbound access only
Fairfield	Danbury	5.61	9.03		5	Route 37 / Route 39 / Route 53 – Downtown Danbury, Bethel	Route 37 not signed westbound
Fairfield	Danbury	6.25	10.06		6	Route 37 – New Fairfield	Westbound exit and eastbound entrance
Fairfield	Danbury	7.97	12.83		7	US 7 north / US 202 east – Brookfield, New Milford	Eastern end of US 7/US 202 concurrency; exit 10 on US 7
Fairfield	Danbury	8.26	13.29		8	I-84 east / Newtown Road (SR 806 west) – Waterbury	Eastern end of I-84 concurrency
Fairfield	Danbury	8.26	13.29	Eastern end of freeway section			
Fairfield	Town of Newtown	11.45	18.43			Route 25 north – Hawleyville, Brookfield, Bridgewater	Western end of Route 25 concurrency
Fairfield	Borough of Newtown	14.26	22.95			Route 25 south – Bridgeport	Eastern end of Route 25 concurrency
Fairfield	Town of Newtown	15.52	24.98	Western end of freeway section			
Fairfield	Town of Newtown	15.52	24.98	10	15	I-84 west / Church Hill Road (SR 816 east) – Danbury	Western end of I-84 concurrency
Fairfield	Town of Newtown	16.33	26.28	11	16	Route 34 to Route 25 – Derby, New Haven, Bridgeport	Access via SSR 490
New Haven	Southbury	18.93	30.46	13	18	River Road	Eastbound exit and westbound entrance
New Haven	Southbury	20.40	32.83	14	20	Route 172 – South Britain	Southern terminus of Route 172
New Haven	Southbury	22.19	35.71	15	21	I-84 east / Route 67 south / Kettletown Road (SSR 487 south) – Waterbury, Southford, Oxford, Seymour, New Haven	Eastern end of I-84 concurrency; western end of Route 67 concurrency
New Haven	Southbury	22.19	35.71	Eastern end of freeway section			
New Haven	Southbury	23.76	38.24			Route 67 north (Roxbury Road)	Eastern end of Route 67 concurrency
Litchfield	Woodbury	25.94	41.75			Route 64 east – Middlebury, Waterbury	Western terminus of Route 64
Litchfield	Woodbury	26.90	43.29			Route 317 west – Roxbury	Eastern terminus of Route 317
Litchfield	Woodbury	27.60	44.42			Route 47 north – Hotchkissville, Washington	Southern terminus of Route 47
Litchfield	Woodbury	31.48	50.66			Route 61 north – Bethlehem	Southern terminus of Route 61
Litchfield	Watertown	34.52	55.55			To Route 63 south – Waterbury	Access via SR 838
Litchfield	Watertown	34.57	55.64			Route 63 – East Morris, Waterbury	
Litchfield	Watertown	35.81	57.63			Route 262 east – Oakville	Southern terminus of Route 262
Litchfield	Thomaston	38.61	62.14			Route 109 west / Watertown Road (SR 810 east) – Morris	Eastern terminus of Route 109
Litchfield	Thomaston	39.40	63.41	Western end of freeway section			
Litchfield	Thomaston	39.40	63.41		38	Route 8 south / Route 254 north / Watertown Road (SR 810 west) / Waterbury Road (SR 848 south) – Waterbury, Litchfield	Western end of Route 8 concurrency; southern terminus of Route 254
Litchfield	Thomaston	40.61	65.36		39	Route 8 north / Route 222 north – Torrington, Harwinton	Eastern end of Route 8 concurrency; southern terminus of Route 222
Litchfield	Thomaston	40.61	65.36	Eastern end of freeway section			
Litchfield	Plymouth	41.28	66.43			Route 262 south – Airport	Northern terminus of Route 262
Litchfield	Plymouth	44.15	71.05			Route 72 – Harwinton, Bristol	
Hartford	Bristol	46.86	75.41			Route 69 south – Wolcott	Western end of Route 69 concurrency
Hartford	Bristol	47.25	76.04			Route 69 north – Burlington	Eastern end of Route 69 concurrency
Hartford	Bristol	48.30	77.73			Route 229 south – Southington, Theme Park	Northern terminus of Route 229
Hartford	Farmington	50.95	82.00			Route 177 – Plainville, Unionville	
Hartford	Farmington	52.67	84.76			To I-84 west / Route 10 – Plainville, Waterbury	Access via SR 552
Hartford	Farmington	55.13	88.72			Birdseye Road (SR 549 north) to I-84 west – Waterbury	Access to I-84 via Fienemann Road
Hartford	Farmington	55.92	89.99			Colt Highway (SR 531)	
Hartford	Farmington	55.92	89.99	Western end of freeway section			
Hartford	Farmington	55.92	89.99	38	54A	I-84 east – Hartford	Western end of I-84 concurrency; westbound exit and eastbound entrance
Hartford	Farmington	56.34	90.67	39	54B	To Route 4 – Farmington	Westbound exit and eastbound entrance; access via SR 508
Hartford	Farmington	56.91– 57.92	91.59– 93.21	39A	55	Route 9 south – Newington, New Britain	Northern terminus and exits 40A and 40B on Route 9 north; Signed for Newington eastbound, New Britain westbound
Hartford	West Hartford	58.19	93.65	40	56	Route 71 (New Britain Avenue) – Corbins Corner	
Hartford	West Hartford	59.15	95.19	41	57	South Main Street (Route 173 south) – Elmwood	
Hartford	West Hartford	59.97	96.51	42	58A	Trout Brook Drive – Elmwood	Westbound exit and eastbound entrance
Hartford	West Hartford	59.87– 60.32	96.35– 97.08	43	58B	Park Road – West Hartford Center	Access via SR 501
Hartford	West Hartford	61.09	98.31	44	59A	Prospect Avenue / New Park Avenue	Access via Caya Avenue / Kane Street
Hartford	Hartford	61.85	99.54	45	59B	Flatbush Avenue	Westbound exit and eastbound entrance; access via SR 504
Hartford	Hartford	62.37– 62.71	100.37– 100.92	46	60	Sisson Avenue	Access via SR 503
Hartford	Hartford	62.96	101.32	47	61A	Sigourney Street	Westbound exit and eastbound entrance
Hartford	Hartford	63.30– 63.69	101.87– 102.50	48A	61A	Asylum Street	Signed as exit 61B westbound
Hartford	Hartford	63.30	101.87	48B	61A	Capitol Avenue	Eastbound exit and westbound entrance
Hartford	Hartford	63.91	102.85	49	61B	Ann Uccello Street	Eastbound exit and westbound entrance; to the PeoplesBank Arena
Hartford	Hartford	63.96– 64.55	102.93– 103.88	50	62A	US 44 west (Main Street) to I-91 south – New Haven	Western end of US 44 concurrency; US 44 not signed eastbound; exit 38A on I-91
Hartford	Hartford	63.96– 64.55	102.93– 103.88	51-52	62B-C	I-91 – Bradley International Airport, Springfield, New Haven	Signed as exits 62B (I-91 north) and 62C (I-91 south); no westbound access to I-91 south; exits 38A and 38C on I-91
Hartford	Connecticut River	64.50– 64.74	103.80– 104.19	Bulkeley Bridge			
Hartford	East Hartford	64.87	104.40	53	63A	US 44 east (Connecticut Boulevard) / East River Drive – East Hartford	Eastern end of US 44 concurrency; no westbound exit
Hartford	East Hartford	65.10– 65.41	104.77– 105.27	54-55	63A-B	Route 2 – Norwich, New London, Downtown Hartford	Signed as exits 63A (Route 2 west) and 63B (Route 2 east); no eastbound access to Route 2 west; Route 2 west not signed; New London not signed
Hartford	East Hartford	65.10– 65.41	104.77– 105.27	56	63C	Governor Street – Downtown East Hartford	Access via SR 500; Downtown East Hartford not signed eastbound
Hartford	East Hartford			–	–	I-84 east (Restricted Lanes) – Boston	Western terminus of I-84 Restricted Lanes
Hartford	East Hartford	66.56	107.12	57	64A	Route 15 south (Wilbur Cross Highway) to I-91 south – Charter Oak Bridge, New York City	Westbound exit and eastbound entrance
Hartford	East Hartford	67.13	108.04	58	64B	Roberts Street (SR 518) / Silver Lane (SR 502) to Burnside Avenue (US 44)	Westbound exit to Silver Lane from Restricted Lanes
Hartford	East Hartford	68.35	110.00	59	67	I-384 east – Providence	Western terminus and exit 1A on I-384; former routing of I-84
Hartford	Manchester	70.09	112.80	60	68	I-84 – Hartford, Boston	Eastern end of I-84 concurrency;
Hartford	Manchester	70.09	112.80	Eastern end of freeway section			
Hartford	Manchester	71.93	115.76			West Center Street (SR 502 west)	
Hartford	Manchester	72.67	116.95			Route 83 – Glastonbury, Vernon	
Tolland	Bolton	75.83	122.04			Route 85 south / Cidermill Road (SR 533 north) – Bolton Center, Gay City State Park	Northern terminus of Route 85
Tolland	Bolton	76.62	123.31			I-384 west – Manchester, Hartford	Interchange; westbound exit and eastbound entrance; eastern terminus of I-384; former I-84
Tolland	Bolton	76.95	123.84			US 44 east – Coventry, Mansfield	Interchange; eastbound exit and westbound entrance; eastern end of US 44 concurrency
Tolland	Andover	82.68	133.06			Route 316 south – Andover, Hebron	Northern terminus of Route 316
Tolland	Andover	83.91	135.04			Route 87 south – Columbia, Norwich	Northern terminus of Route 87
Tolland	Columbia	87.81	141.32			Route 66 – Columbia, Middletown, Willimantic	
Tolland	Columbia	87.81	141.32	Western end of freeway section			
Windham	Windham	89.72	144.39		89	Route 32 – Stafford Springs, Willimantic	
Tolland	Mansfield	91.94	147.96		91	Route 195 – Storrs, Univ. of Connecticut	
Windham	Windham	93.15	149.91	Eastern end of freeway section			
Windham	Windham	93.15	149.91			Route 66 west – Willimantic	Eastern terminus of Route 66
Windham	Windham	95.00	152.89			Route 203 south – Windham Center	Northern terminus of Route 203
Windham	Chaplin	96.96	156.04			Route 198 north – Chaplin, Phoenixville, Woodstock, Putnam	Southern terminus of Route 198
Windham	Hampton	101.30	163.03			Route 97 – Pomfret, Scotland	
Windham	Brooklyn	107.44	172.91			Route 169 – Pomfret, Canterbury	
Windham	Killingly			Western end of limited-access section			
Windham	Killingly	110.96	178.57	–	–	Route 12 north – Danielson	At-grade intersection; western end of Route 12 concurrency
Windham	Killingly	111.31	179.14	–	–	Route 12 south – Plainfield	At-grade intersection; eastern end of Route 12 concurrency
Windham	Killingly	111.80	179.92	–	–	I-395 – Norwich, Worcester	Cloverleaf interchange; no westbound access to I-395 south; exits 37A-B on I-395; former Route 52
Windham	Killingly	111.80	179.92	Eastern end of limited-access section			
Windham	Killingly					South Frontage Road to Westcott Road (SR 607 west)	Interchange; eastbound exit only
Windham	Killingly					Westcott Road (SR 607 west) – Danielson	Interchange; no eastbound exit
Windham	Killingly					Snake Meadow Road (SR 664 south) – Moosup	
Windham	Killingly	116.04	186.75			To I-395 south – Norwich	Interchange; westbound exit and eastbound entrance; access via SR 695
Windham	Killingly	116.33	187.21			US 6 east – Providence	Continuation into Rhode Island
1.000 mi = 1.609 km; 1.000 km = 0.621 mi: Concurrency terminus; HOV only; Incomplete access; Route transition

== Special routes ==

There have been several routes signed as US 6A in the state. No special routes currently exist.

- Newtown–Southbury: Original surface routing before creation of expressway later to become I-84; currently SR 816.
- Plymouth–Hartford: Now US 6. At this time, the old US 6 went along Route 64 to downtown Waterbury then along Route 10 to Farmington.
- Woodbury–Willimantic: West of Meriden, this was the original alignment of US 6. When US 6 was reassigned to the former US 6A from Plymouth to Farmington, this became US 6A. This US 6A was subsequently extended through Meriden to Willimantic along modern Route 66. An expressway upgrade was planned for this US 6A. Only a portion of the highway was built and is now I-691. Between Woodbury and Waterbury this section is now Route 64.
- Coventry–Windham: Became US 6A when Route 3 was deleted. Swapped with the old US 6 in 1939 and finally deleted in 1942 when US 6A became Route 31.
- Danielson: Old routing prior to construction of the two-lane freeway.

U.S. Route 6
Previous state: New York	Connecticut	Next state: Rhode Island
