= List of Interstate Highways in Connecticut =

Dwight D. Eisenhower National System of Interstate and Defense Highways
- Standard Interstate Highway signs in Connecticut
- All Interstate Highways in Connecticut

System information
- Length: 446.33 mi (718.30 km)
- Notes: Interstate Highways in Connecticut maintained by ConnDOT

Highway names
- Interstates: Interstate X (I-X)
- US Highways: U.S. Route X (US X)
- State: Route X

System links
- Connecticut State Highway System; Interstate; US; State; SSR; SR; Scenic

Interstate Highways in the U.S. state of Connecticut run a total of 446.33 miles (718.30 km). Connecticut has three primary highways and five auxiliary highways. Most of the highways are maintained by the Connecticut Department of Transportation, with the exception of Interstate 684, which is maintained by the New York State Department of Transportation.

In 1957, Connecticut received approval for the routes of its three primary Interstate highways: I-84, I-91, and I-95. This plan was extended in 1959 to include I-291 and I-491. The first Interstate Highway signs were installed on a completed section of I-91 north of Hartford in 1961. The primary interstates were all completed by 1969 after the last section of I-84 opened between Farmington and Plainville. The rest of the highways were built or renumbered to their current designations by 1994 when a five-mile section of I-291 opened 35 years behind schedule. Connecticut was one of the last states in the US to raise its maximum speed limit above the former federally mandated limit of 55 mph (89 km/h). The state raised its maximum to 65 mph (105 km/h) in 1998.

Though parts of the Interstate Highway System in Connecticut were previously tolled, all tolls were removed from Connecticut's highways by 1988.

== Interstate Highways ==
Number	Length (mi)	Length (km)	Southern or western terminus	Northern or eastern terminus	Formed	Removed	Notes
I-82	—	—	I-84/US 6 in East Hartford	I-82 at the Rhode Island state line	1956	1968	Early designation for the extension of I-84 from East Hartford to Providence. Re-designated as I-84 in 1968. Completed sections around Manchester and Willimantic re-designated as I-384 and US 6, respectively, in 1984 when East Hartford-Providence I-84 extension was cancelled
I-84	97.90	157.55	I-84 at the New York state line	I-84 at the Massachusetts state line	1969	current	Eastward extension from Manchester to Rhode Island cancelled; completed section around Manchester renumbered as I-384. Willimantic Bypass section re-designated as US 6. I-84 realigned to follow former I-86/Route 15 routing (Wilbur Cross Highway) to I-90 in Massachusetts
I-84 BL	4.1	6.6	I-84/Route 25 in Hawleyville	I-84/US 6/SR 816 in Sandy Hook	1960	1979	Ran from what is today between exits 9 & 10 along Route 25 and US 6
I-86	31.27	50.32	I-84/US 6 in East Hartford	I-86 at the Massachusetts state line	1971	1984	Renumbered I-84 and Route 3
I-87	1.41	2.27	I-87 at the New York state line	I-87 at the New York state line	1961	1968	Renumbered I-684
I-89	—	—	I-95 in Norwalk	I-89 at the Massachusetts state line	1956	1970	Proposed, but never completed, interstate route paralleling US-7 from Norwalk, CT to Canadian Border north of Burlington, VT. Completed freeway sections in Connecticut (through Norwalk, Danbury, and around Brookfield) designated as US 7
I-91	58.00	93.34	I-95 in New Haven	I-91 at the Massachusetts state line	1959	current	
I-95	111.57	179.55	I-95 at the New York state line	I-95 at the Rhode Island state line	1964	current	Part of the Connecticut Turnpike from the New York state line at Greenwich to Waterford
I-284	—	—	I-84/US 6/Route 2 in East Hartford	I-291 in South Windsor	1976	1983	Unbuilt due to environmental concerns, except of a short freeway stub that serve as ramps from I-84 to Governor Street
I-291	6.02	9.69	I-91/Route 218 in Windsor	I-84 in Manchester	1994	current	Partially completed Hartford Beltway (northeast quadrant). Northwest quadrant cancelled; southwest quadrant of I-291 completed as an extension of the Route 9 freeway between I-91 in Berlin to I-84 in Farmington
I-384	8.53	13.73	I-84/US 6 in East Hartford	US 6/US 44 in Bolton	1984	current	Designated as I-84 from its opening in 1971 to 1984
I-395	54.69	88.02	I-95 in East Lyme	I-395 at the Massachusetts state line	1968	current	Part of the Connecticut Turnpike from Waterford to Killingly; formerly designated as Route 52, and proposed as an extension to I-290. First highway (in 2015) in Connecticut to receive mile-based exits
I-484	—	—	I-84/US 6 in Hartford	I-91 in Hartford	1968	1983	Became the Conland–Whitehead Highway and unsigned SR 598
I-491	—	—	I-91 in Wethersfield	I-84/US 6 in East Hartford	1958	1973	Parts co-signed with I-86; re-designated as Route 3
I-684	1.41	2.27	I-684 at the New York state line	I-684 at the New York state line	1968	current	No intersections with other roads in Connecticut; previously designated as I-87
I-691	8.92	14.36	I-84 in Southington	I-91/Route 66 in Meriden	1976	current	Formerly designated as US 6A, then Route 66
Former

== Gallery ==
Interstate Highways in Connecticut
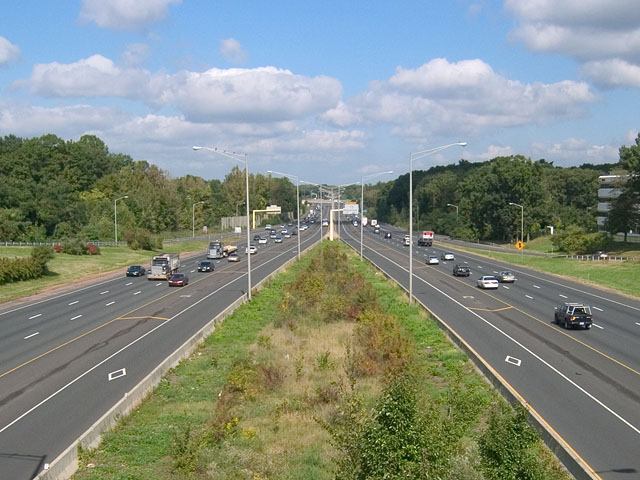
I-91 in Windsor

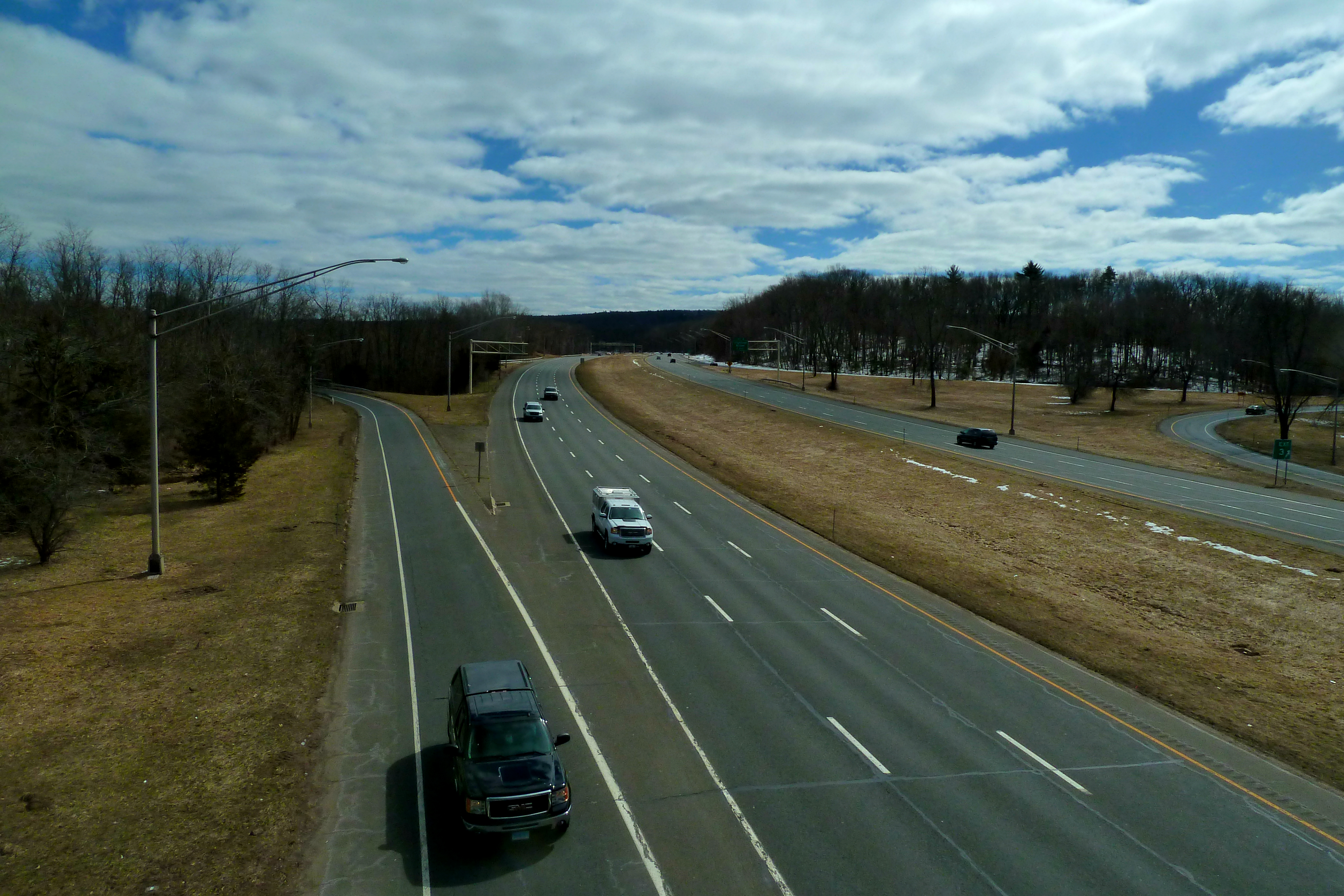
I-384 in Manchester

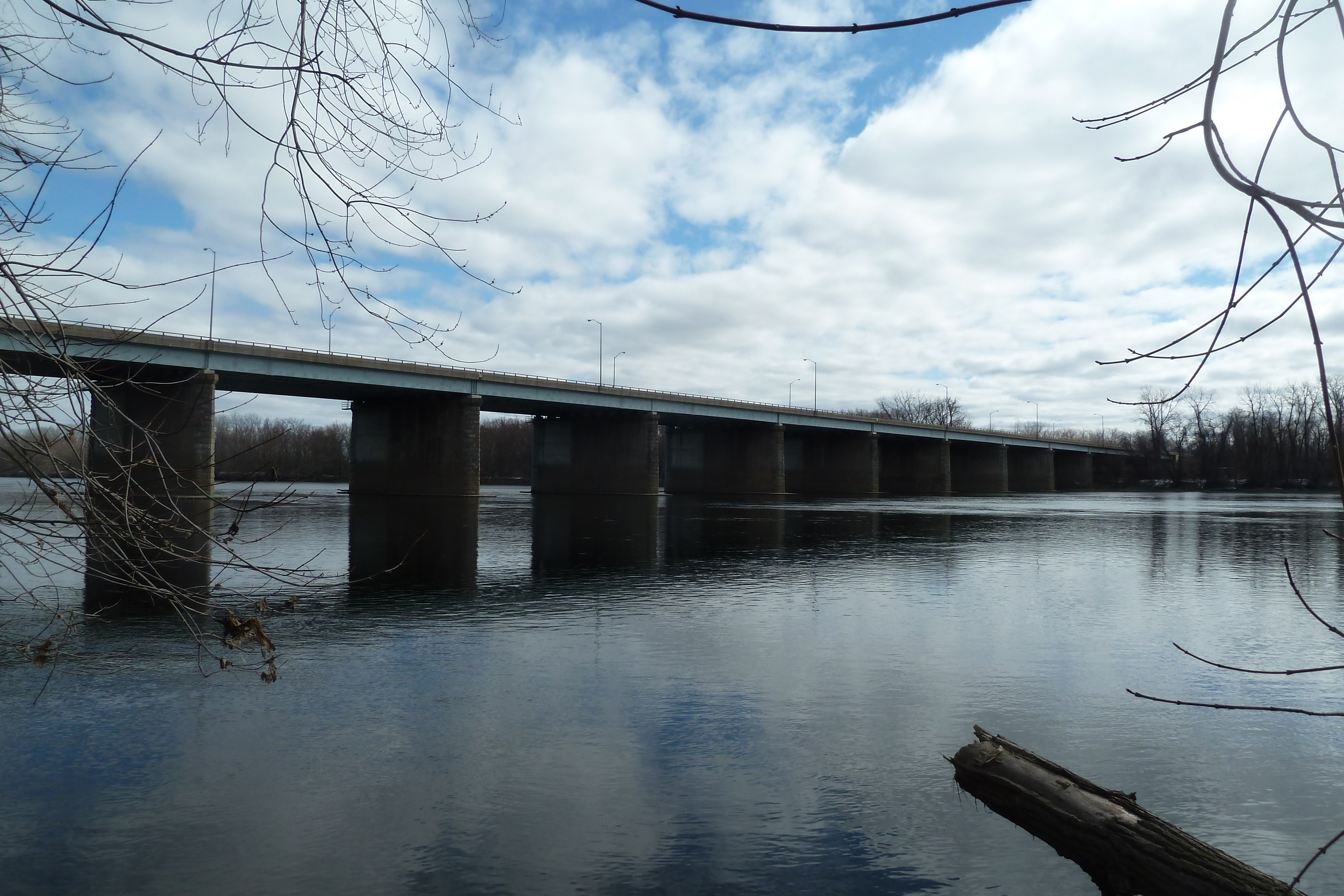
I-291 and the Bissell Bridge in Windsor

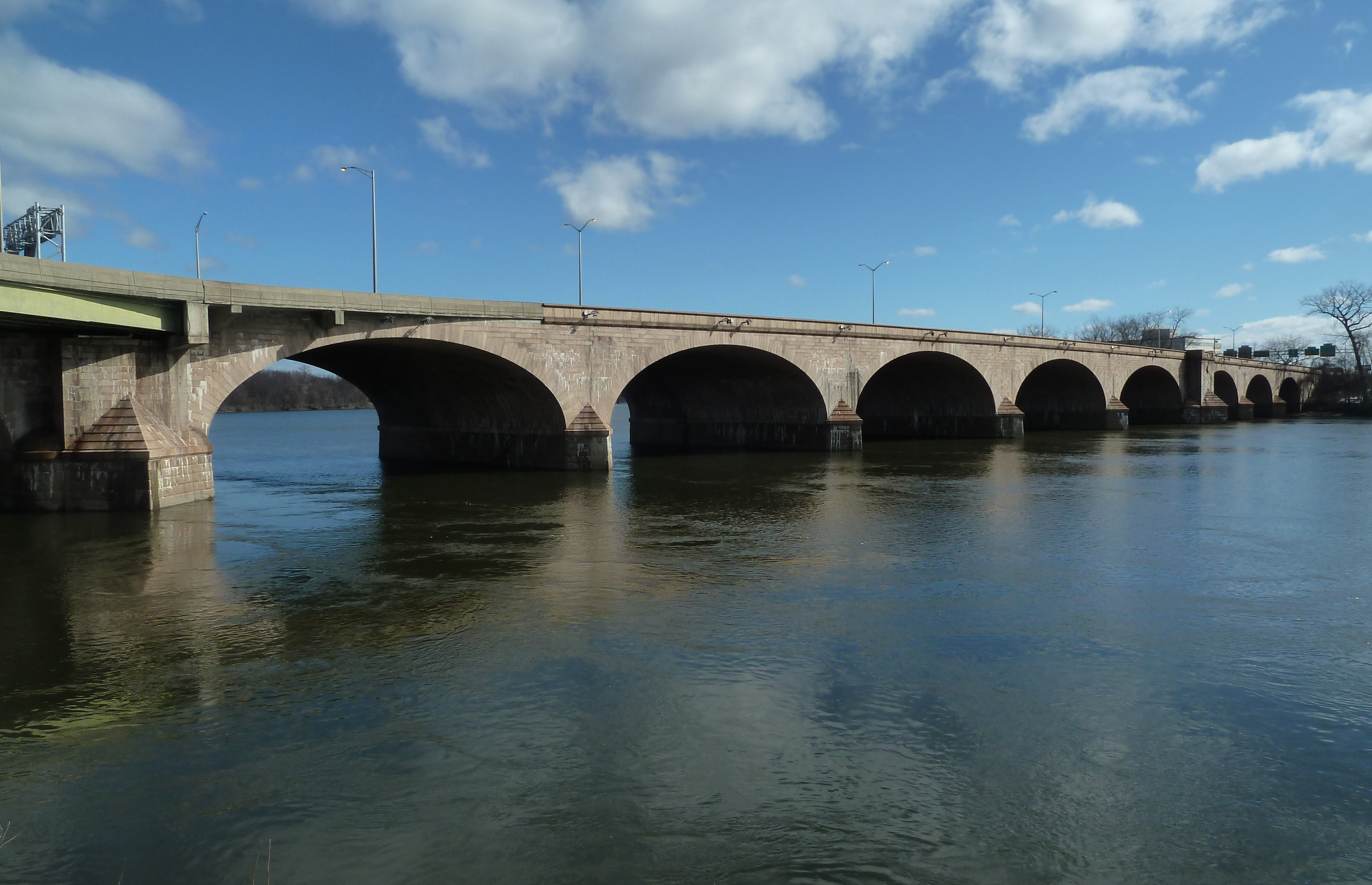
I-84 and the Bulkeley Bridge in Hartford

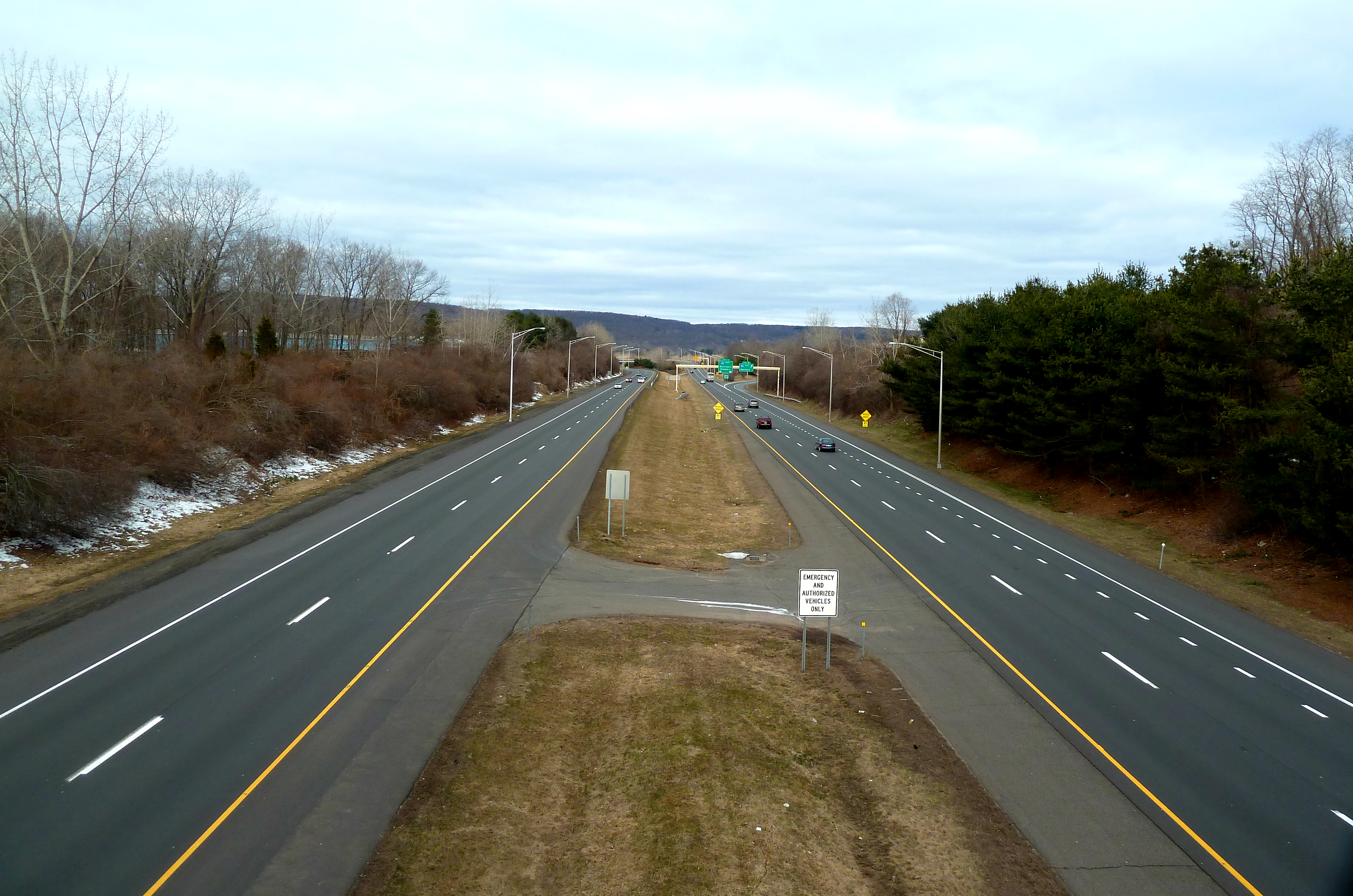
I-691 in Cheshire

== See also ==
- Connecticut Turnpike
