= Connecticut Route 194 =

State highway in Hartford County, Connecticut, US

Route 194
- Sullivan Avenue
- Map of Hartford County in northern Connecticut with Route 194 highlighted in red

Route information
- Maintained by CTDOT
- Length: 3.67 mi (5.91 km)
- Existed: 1932–present

Major junctions
- West end: US 5 in South Windsor
- East end: Route 30 in South Windsor

Location
- Country: United States
- State: Connecticut
- Counties: Hartford

Highway system
- Connecticut State Highway System; Interstate; US; State; SSR; SR; Scenic
← Route 193	→ Route 195

Route 194, known as Sullivan Avenue for its entire length, is a Connecticut state highway located entirely within the town of South Windsor. It connects the historic village of East Windsor Hill to the town center.

== Route description ==
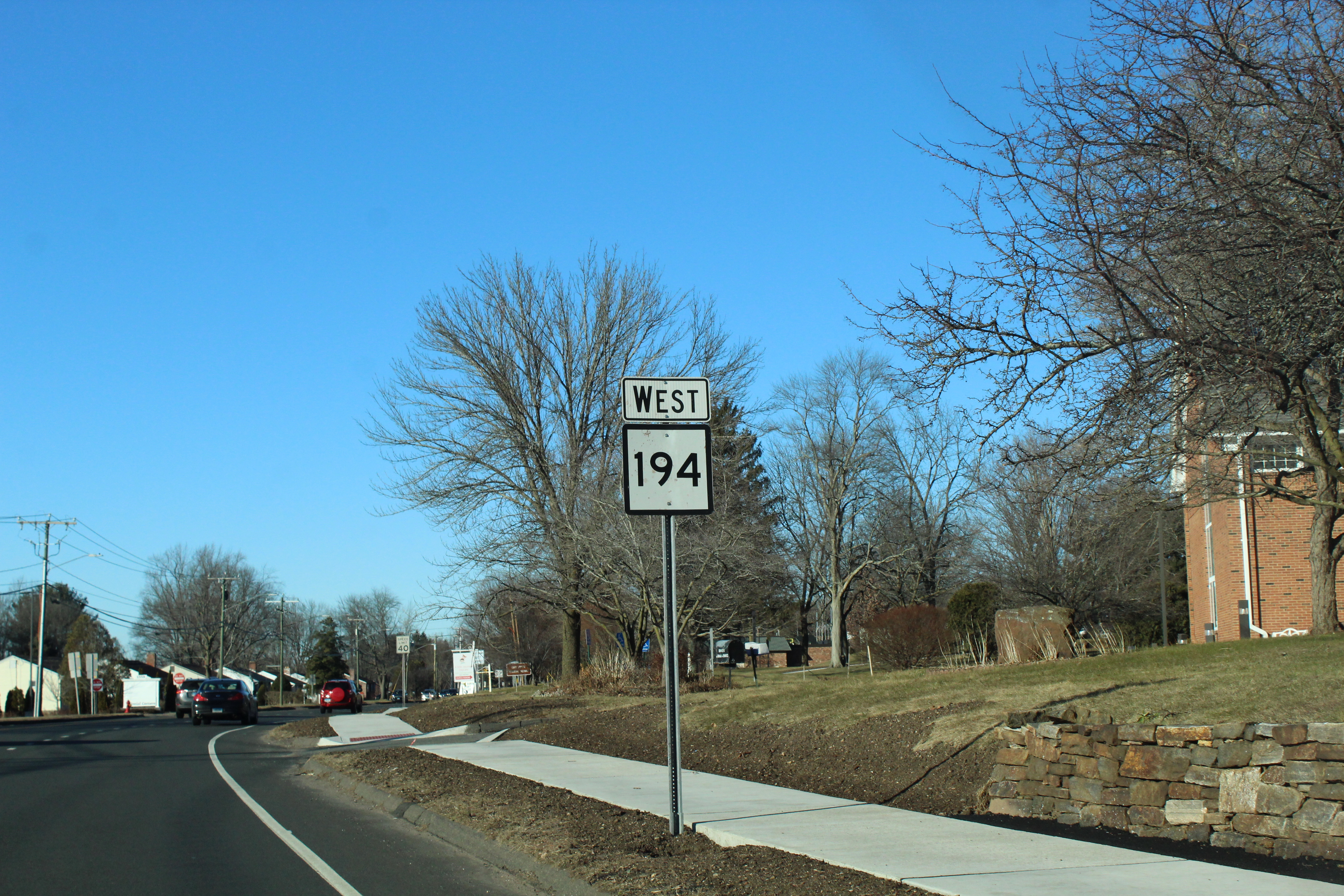
Westbound in South Windsor beyond Route 30

Route 194 starts at an intersection with US 5 in the village of East Windsor Hill and proceeds eastward. Half a mile later, it crosses over some railroad tracks and continues east towards the Podunk River. The road turns south after crossing the river and eventually meets with Route 74 in South Windsor center. It ends after another 0.3 miles (0.48 km) at an intersection with Route 30 in the town center. Route 194 has short four lane sections near its termini but is otherwise a two lane minor arterial road. It carries traffic volumes of about 14,000 per day.

== History ==
Route 194 was established as a new route in the 1932 state highway renumbering and has had no major changes since then. The western terminus was moved slightly east in the early 1940s when US 5 was rerouted. In 1996, the state proposed widening Route 194, but this proposal was never carried out. In 1998, the intersection at Ayers and Graham Roads was improved for safety reasons.

== Junction list ==
The entire route is in South Windsor, Hartford County.

mi	km	Destinations	Notes
0.00	0.00	US 5 – East Windsor, East Hartford	Western terminus
3.38	5.44	Route 74 east – Rockville, Tolland	Western terminus of Route 74
3.67	5.91	Route 30 – Manchester, Vernon, East Hartford	Eastern terminus
1.000 mi = 1.609 km; 1.000 km = 0.621 mi
