= Stephen P. Hunger =

American pediatric oncologist

- Born: South Windsor, Connecticut, USA
- Spouse: Camille A. Pane (m. 1986)

Academic background
- Education: BS, Applied biology, 1981, Massachusetts Institute of Technology; MD, 1985, University of Connecticut School of Medicine

Academic work
- Institutions: Children's Hospital of Philadelphia; Children's Hospital Colorado; University of Florida College of Medicine

Stephen Patrick Hunger is an American pediatric oncologist. He is the Chief of the Division of Oncology, Director of the Center for Childhood Cancer Research, and holder of the Jeffrey E. Perelman Distinguished Chair in the Department of Pediatrics at the Children's Hospital of Philadelphia (CHOP).

== Early life and education ==
Hunger was born and raised in South Windsor, Connecticut, to an engineer father. He attended South Windsor High School and was named Salutatorian when he graduated in 1977. He was also the recipient of a four year scholarship based on his score from the National Merit test. Following high school, Hunger chose to attend the Massachusetts Institute of Technology where he majored in biology and then enrolled at the University of Connecticut School of Medicine. After graduating from medical school, Hunger served his internship and residency at Johns Hopkins University.

== Career ==
Upon completing his residency, Hunger entered a pediatric haematology-oncology fellowship program at Stanford University in 1988 where he became interested in the care of patients with leukaemia. He was encouraged to work alongside Michael Cleary in his laboratory, who he said "most shaped my future laboratory career." Following his formal education, Hunger accepted a faculty appointment in pediatrics as well as molecular genetics and microbiology at the University of Florida College of Medicine before moving to the University of Colorado and Children's Hospital Colorado in 2007. He was Vice Chair of the acute lymphoblastic leukemia (ALL) committee of the Children’s Oncology Group from 2002 to 2007 and then served as the Chairman of the Children’s Oncology Group Acute Lymphoblastic Leukemia Disease Committee from 2008 until 2015. While serving in these roles, he led efforts to molecularly dissect pediatric leukemia and eventually unravel several molecular markers that helped stratify the disease and find targetable genetic lesions. During his tenure in Colorado, Hunger also served as director of the Center for Cancer and Blood Disorders and held the Ergen Family Chair in Pediatric Cancer. He was also a professor of Pediatrics at the University of Colorado School of Medicine and the chief of the Section of Pediatric Hematology/Oncology/Bone Marrow Transplantation.

In the fall of 2014, Hunger became Chief of Oncology and Director of the Center for Childhood Cancer Research at the Children's Hospital of Philadelphia (CHOP). During his tenure at CHOP, he has pioneered translational discoveries in pediatric hematology/oncology, specifically in the field of pediatric leukemia and ALL.

== Personal life ==
Hunger married Camille A. Pane in 1986.
