= Connecticut Route 30 =

State highway in Connecticut, US

Route 30
- Map of northern Connecticut with Route 30 highlighted in red

Route information
- Maintained by CTDOT
- Length: 20.94 mi (33.70 km)
- Existed: 1943–present

Major junctions
- South end: I-291 / US 5 in South Windsor
- I-84 / Route 83 in Manchester and Vernon
- North end: Route 190 in Stafford

Location
- Country: United States
- State: Connecticut
- Counties: Hartford, Tolland

Highway system
- Connecticut State Highway System; Interstate; US; State; SSR; SR; Scenic
← Route 27	→ Route 31

Route 30 is a Connecticut state highway running from South Windsor to Stafford. Although officially designated north–south, the section from South Windsor to Vernon is a major east–west arterial road.

== Route description ==
Route 30 begins at the junction of US 5 and I-291 in South Windsor. As a primary arterial road, it proceeds northeastward to the town center, where it meets Route 194, which also provides access to Route 74. Route 30 then turns southeastward, crossing into Manchester. It then meets I-84 before beginning a 1.5 mile concurrency with Route 83 as it curves northeastward. The concurrency ends at I-84, where Route 30 turns east to parallel I-84. After turning northeastward and intersecting Route 31, it enters Tolland, where it briefly overlaps with Route 74. From here to its northern end, Route 30 is a minor semi-rural road as it passes through Ellington (where it intersects with Route 140), and Stafford, where it ends at Route 190.

== History ==
The northern part of Route 30 was commissioned as several smaller routes in the 1920s. In 1932, these routes were combined as part of Route 15. When Route 15 was realigned over the Wilbur Cross Highway in 1943, the old route was commissioned as Route 30.

In 1951, Route 30 was extended at its south end from Route 74 to US 5. In 2003, the south end was moved to the intersection of US 5 and I-291.

== Major intersections ==
County	Location	mi	km	Destinations	Notes
Hartford	South Windsor	0.00	0.00	I-291 / US 5 – East Windsor, East Hartford, Manchester	Southern terminus; exit 2 on I-291
Hartford	South Windsor	3.95	6.36	Route 194 west to Route 74 – Ellington, Rockville, Warehouse Point, East Windsor Hill, South Windsor Town Offices	Eastern terminus of Route 194
Hartford	Manchester	5.75	9.25	I-84 west – Hartford	Exit 63 on I-84; former I-86
Hartford	Manchester	6.17	9.93	I-84 east / Route 83 south – Tolland, Manchester Center, Glastonbury	Southern end of Route 83 concurrency; exit 63 on I-84
Tolland	Vernon	7.49	12.05	I-84 west – Hartford	Exit 64 on I-84; former I-86
Tolland	Vernon	7.68	12.36	Route 83 north – Rockville, Somers	Northern end of Route 83 concurrency
Tolland	Vernon	8.13	13.08	I-84 east – Boston	
Tolland	Vernon	8.39	13.50	I-84 west – Hartford	Exit 65 on I-84; former I-86
Tolland	Vernon	9.46	15.22	Tunnel Road (SR 533 south)	
Tolland	Vernon	9.57	15.40	To I-84	Access via SR 541
Tolland	Vernon	9.69	15.59	West Street (SR 527 north)	
Tolland	Vernon	11.86	19.09	Route 31 – Coventry, Rockville	
Tolland	Tolland	13.40	21.57	Route 74 west – South Windsor	Southern end of Route 74 concurrency
Tolland	Tolland	13.54	21.79	Route 74 east – Willington	Northern end of Route 74 concurrency
Tolland	Ellington	17.81	28.66	Route 140 – East Windsor, Stafford Springs	
Tolland	Stafford	20.94	33.70	Route 190 – Stafford Springs, Somers	Northern terminus
1.000 mi = 1.609 km; 1.000 km = 0.621 mi
