= TicketHurry =

TicketHurry is an online ticketing company, serving as an alternative to similar marketplaces such as StubHub and TicketsNow. TicketHurry's listings include all spectator events, including concerts, sporting events, theater, and Broadway. The company is primarily an aggregator as they do not purchase tickets or act as a ticket broker. Tickets offered through TicketHurry mostly come from record labels and independent ticket brokers, however a small percentage are provided by general ticket holders and season ticket holders.

== Personal shopper ==
In 2013, TicketHurry introduced the personal shopper – a service aimed at simplifying ticket buying for new shoppers. The service allows customers to send requests for seating and budget. Customers will then be given recommendations that fit closest to the criteria.

== Images ==
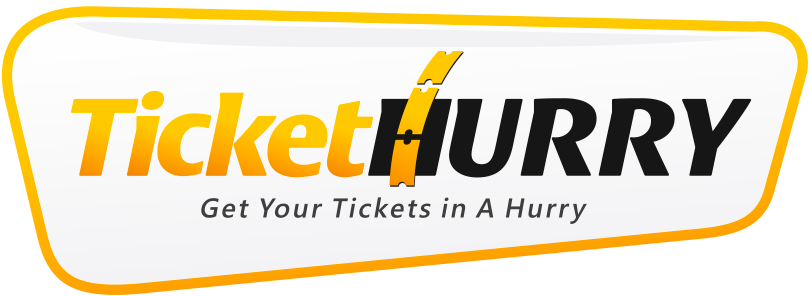
Default TicketHurry logo

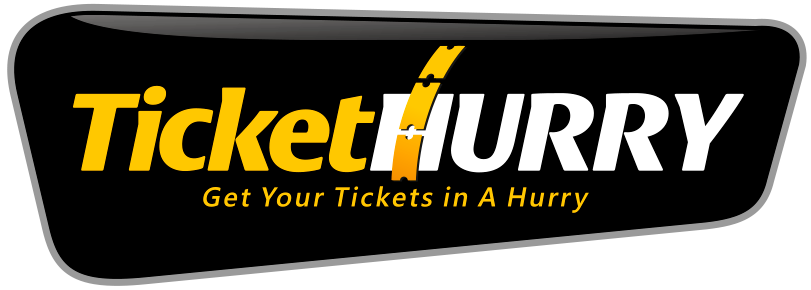
TicketHurry dark background logo
