= Connecticut Route 31 =

State highway in Tolland County, Connecticut, US

Route 31
- Map of Tolland County in northern Connecticut with Route 31 highlighted in red

Route information
- Maintained by CTDOT
- Length: 14.34 mi (23.08 km)
- Existed: 1942 (extended 1963)–present

Major junctions
- South end: Route 32 in Mansfield
- I-84 in Vernon
- North end: Route 74 in Vernon

Location
- Country: United States
- State: Connecticut
- Counties: Tolland

Highway system
- Connecticut State Highway System; Interstate; US; State; SSR; SR; Scenic
← Route 30	→ Route 32

Route 31 is a north–south state highway in Connecticut running for 14.34 miles (23.08 km) from Route 74 in Vernon to Route 32 in Mansfield. Although it is officially logged as an east-west route, it is signed north-south.

== Route description ==
Route 31 begins at an intersection with Route 74 in Vernon and heads southeast, intersecting Route 30, and I-84 before crossing into Tolland.

In Tolland, Route 31 continues southeast before turning south briefly before crossing into Coventry. In Coventry, Route 31 continues south to a concurrency with US 44. The two highways run together for slightly more than one mile (1.6 km) before Route 31 heads southeast, crossing Route 275 before continuing into Mansfield.

In Mansfield, Route 31 continues southeast before ending at an intersection with Route 32.

== History ==
The southern part of Route 31 was commissioned as part of the original alignment of US 6 in 1926. In approximately 1938, US 6 was rerouted and the old route was designated US 6A.

In 1942, US 6 was rerouted again and the old US 6A was commissioned as Route 31. In 1963, Route 31 was extended northward to its current route.

== Junction list ==
The entire route is in Tolland County.

Location	mi	km	Destinations	Notes
Mansfield	14.34	23.08	Route 32 – Mansfield, Willimantic	Southern terminus
Coventry	11.10	17.86	Route 275 east – Storrs	Western terminus of Route 275
Coventry	6.90	11.10	US 44 east – Mansfield	Southern end of US 44 concurrency
Coventry	5.80	9.33	US 44 west – Bolton	Northern end of US 44 concurrency
Vernon	1.15	1.85	I-84 – Boston, Hartford	Exit 77 on I-84; former I-86
Vernon	0.79	1.27	Route 30 – Tolland, Vernon	
Vernon	0.00	0.00	Route 74 – Rockville, Tolland	Northern terminus
1.000 mi = 1.609 km; 1.000 km = 0.621 mi
