= Charles and Augustus Storrs =

American brothers who co-founded the University of Connecticut

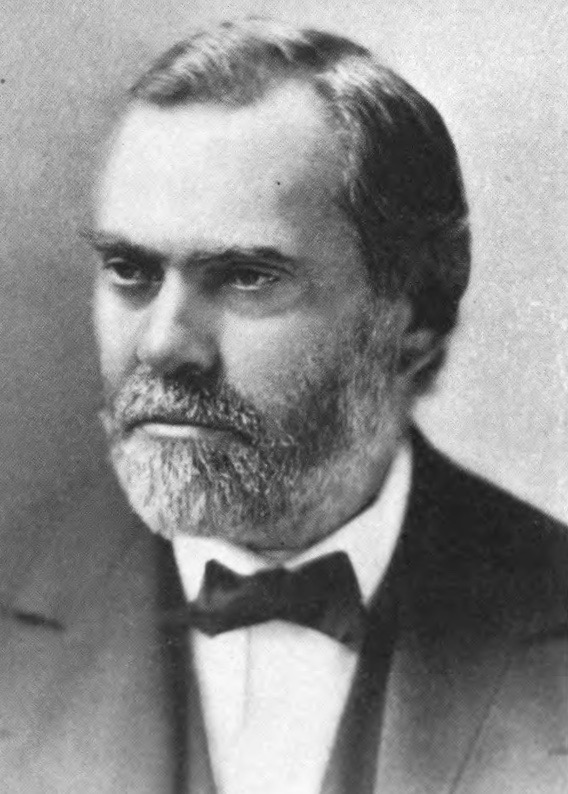
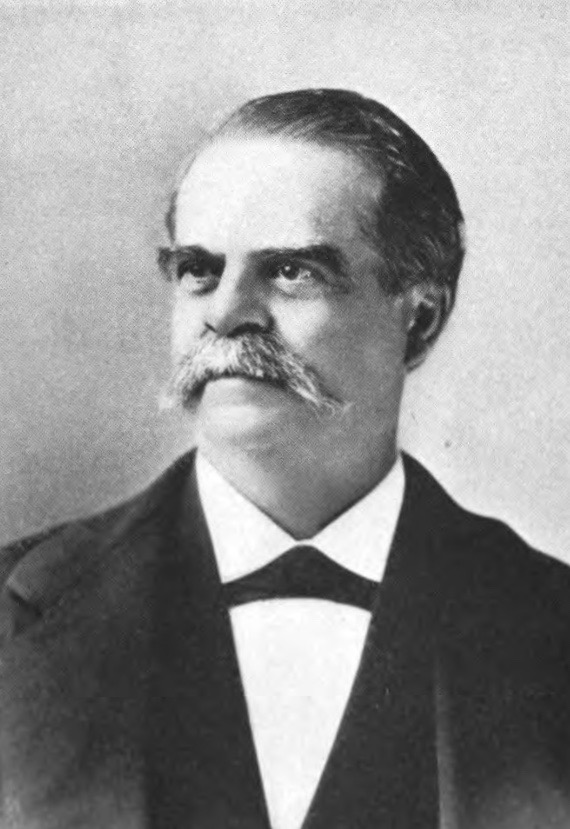
- Charles and Augustus Storrs c.1880
- Other names: Chuck and Augie
- Occupation(s): Merchants, philanthropists
- Known for: Founding the University of Connecticut
- Charles Storrs
- Born: January 24, 1822; Mansfield, Connecticut, US
- Died: September 1, 1884 (aged 62); Brooklyn, New York, US
- Occupation: Merchant, entrepreneur
- Augustus Storrs
- Born: June 4, 1817; Mansfield, Connecticut, US
- Died: March 3, 1892 (aged 74); Mansfield, Connecticut, US
- Occupation: Merchant, entrepreneur, farmer

Charles Storrs (January 24, 1822 – September 1, 1884) and Augustus Storrs (June 4, 1817 – March 3, 1892) were American business partners and brothers who played a key role in establishing the Storrs Agricultural School (now the University of Connecticut) in 1881.

== Biography ==
The Storrs brothers were born into a hardscrabble farming family in Mansfield, Connecticut. Their parents were Royal Storrs, Jr., and Eunice Freeman, both of Mansfield. The Storrs brothers traced their paternity back to Samuel Storrs, who emigrated to the United States in 1663 from Nottinghamshire. He lived in Barnstable, Massachusetts, and then moved to Mansfield, Connecticut, where he died in April 1719.

The brothers attended country school but never went to college. Charles Storrs became a school teacher at age 18, hired a substitute to work on his father's farm, and started himself out in business. He spent three years selling Mansfield-made silk to wholesale merchants, worked on commission for a manufacturing firm in Hartford from 1845 to 1850, and moved to Brooklyn in May 1850. He became a partner in his firm in July 1853, taking over the firm in 1854 and paying off its liabilities. In December 1854, he started a commission-based mercantile firm called the Storrs Brothers, associating with his brothers Augustus and Royal Otis. Royal dropped out after a year or so, but Charles and Augustus continued to work together. Charles served as head of the firm for 25 years, from 1854 to 1879, and accumulated a substantial fortune. Charles was a friend of Horace Greeley, accompanying Greeley on a 1871 trip to Texas and serving as executor of Greeley's will. Retired in 1879, Charles was endorsed by the Brooklyn Eagle and the Brooklyn Times as a candidate for mayor of Brooklyn. In his authorized biography, Charles was described as genial, energetic, and sincere, with a passion for collecting books, art, and friends. In 1866—67 he undertook an Old World journey together with his wife, daughter and several friends, including the poet Edna Dean Proctor who published her impressions in "A Russian Journey" (1871).

Less is known about the elder brother, Augustus Storrs. In 1839, Augustus opened a store in the Gurleyville village of Mansfield. He moved to Hartford in 1846 and to Brooklyn in 1851. Augustus went into business with Charles in New York City, but whereas Charles remained in Brooklyn except to travel, in 1875 Augustus bought the family homestead from Royal Otis and developed a stock farm of more than 800 acres, raising thoroughbred cattle and horses. He spent his summers in Mansfield and actively supervised the family's 800-acre farm. Augustus was a friend of Henry Ward Beecher and attended Beecher's Plymouth Church from 1858 onward, serving as treasurer, trustee, and president. Augustus was accounted a practical, meticulous, and unobtrusive person and successful gentleman farmer.

== Storrs Agricultural School ==
"Having experienced the intellectual privations that are too commonly incident to farm-life," the Storrs brothers in December 1880 offered to donate land and money to the State of Connecticut to found an agricultural school in their hometown of Mansfield. Augustus donated 170 acres and several buildings, while Charles donated $6000 and 800 books from his personal library. Included in the land grant was UConn's first substantial structure, Edwin Whitney Hall, site of a Civil War orphanage which Storrs had previously purchased from Whitney's widow for $5000. The gift was accepted and Storrs Agricultural School established by act of the Connecticut General Assembly on April 21, 1881.

Augustus Storrs initially imposed restrictions on his deed of gift, insisting that the State of Connecticut pay him $12,000 in the event that it decided to relocate the school and sell off the land within twenty years. He also sought to bar the state from using the land for any purpose but an educational institution, explicitly ruling out use for an insane asylum, poorhouse, or reformatory. Amid mounting threats from the legislature to move the school elsewhere, Storrs agreed to convey the land without restrictions. As part of his April 1886 agreement with the state, Augustus went to court to clear the title at his own expense. These conflicts and uncertainty caused the fate of the school to hang in the balance for the first years of its existence.

Augustus continued to aid the school until his death, remitting $30 in water rent in 1889 to buy library books and surrendering two acres of his garden in 1890 to enable a dormitory to be built. Augustus Storrs Hall was built in 1906 and was the first brick building on the campus, initially serving as a men’s dormitory. Renovated to become offices and classrooms in 1952, Storrs Hall has been home to the university's nursing school since 2018.

The main University of Connecticut campus lies in the village of Storrs, Connecticut, named after the brothers, along Connecticut Route 195, a stretch of which is named Storrs Road.

== Family ==
Charles Storrs married Maryett M. Cook of Coventry, Connecticut, on July 4, 1844. The couple had one daughter, Sarah, born December 12, 1845. In 1869, Sarah married David Choate Proctor of Peoria, Illinois, a brother of Edna Dean Proctor's. Augustus Storrs married Antoinette Charlotte Abbe of Windham, Connecticut, in September 1839. The couple had two daughters, Harriet Fitch (1844–1887) and Marie Antoinette. The latter daughter married Benjamin Eyrie Valentine II of Mansfield and had five daughters: Antoinette, Ethel, Elizabeth, Marguerite and Hattie. Both brothers, their wives, children, and other relatives are interred in Storrs Cemetery, in a large family plot at the crest of a hill overlooking UConn's campus. In 1864, Charles Storrs had deeded the cemetery grounds to the township on the condition that the intervening trees be kept down so that the spire of the Storrs Congregational Church be always visible from the plot.
