= John Warner Barber =

American engraver and historian

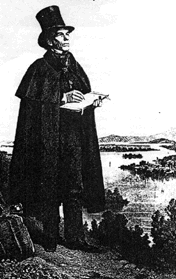
John Warner Barber

John Warner Barber (February 2, 1798 – June 22, 1885) was an American engraver and historian whose books of state, national, and local history featured his vivid illustrations, said to have caught the flavor and appearance of city, town, and countryside scenes in his day. He also worked on books of religious and moral themes, and his Religious Emblems and Allegories were published in 1848.

== Life ==
Barber was born in East Windsor, Connecticut, and learned his craft from the East Windsor printmaker Abner Reed. He was the second of six children of Elijah Barber, a poor farmer, and Mary Barber. Elijah died during the summer of 1812, which forced the fourteen-year-old John to become responsible for supporting the family. In 1823 he opened a business in New Haven, where he produced religious and historical books, illustrated with his own wood and steel engravings.

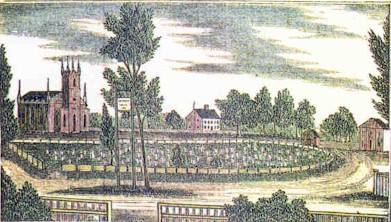
An 1835 engraving by Barber showing the North Haven, Connecticut Green

He traveled around Connecticut, creating ink sketches of town greens, hotels, schools, churches, and harbors and collected local history as he went. He also delved into the works of historians. From all this, he produced the book now commonly called Connecticut Historical Collections. The full title is Connecticut Historical Collections, Containing a General Collection of Interesting Facts, Traditions, Biographical Sketches, Anecdotes, Etc., Relating to the History and Antiquities of Every Town in Connecticut with Geographical Descriptions.

The book has been called "the first popular local history published in the U.S." The book sold well—7,000 copies in its first year even though it cost three dollars, then an average week's pay. Twelve years later it was reissued and again sold well.

Barber started with rough pencil sketches and developed them into more detailed wash drawings. He then transferred the drawings directly to small blocks of boxwood on which he engraved the designs.

"He talked with townspeople, gathered local documents, and made quick sketches everywhere he went," according to a New York Times article from December 10, 1989, quoted on a print-selling Web site. "The illustrations depict each town center, with its homes and churches, academies and courthouses, sailboats plying a river or harbor, an occasional factory belching puffs of smoke, and always a tiny figure or two, often the artist in his top hat, sketching the scene or pointing to the view."

He died in New Haven, Connecticut in June 1885.

== Gallery ==
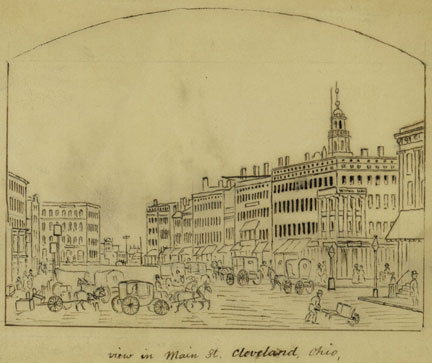
Barber's View in Main St., Cleveland, Ohio, circa 1856-1860

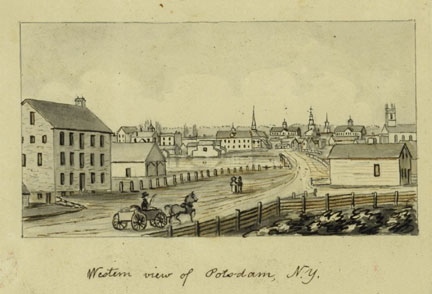
Barber's Western View of Potsdam, New York (circa 1856-1860)

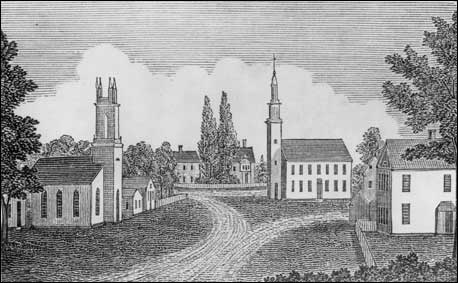
Barber's View of the center of Bethlehem (published 1836), said to be the earliest depiction of the Connecticut town.

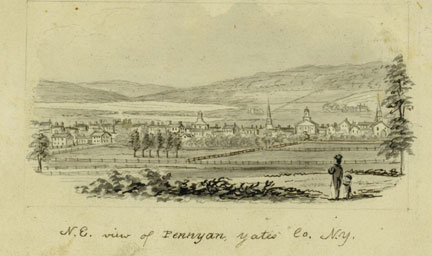
Barber's N.E.View of PENN YAN, Yates Co., N.Y. (circa 1856-1860)

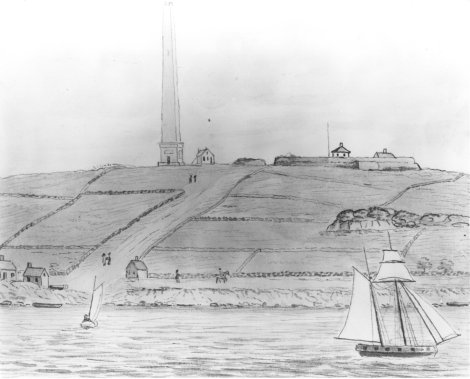
Groton Monument and Fort Griswold

== His books ==
- Historical Scenes in the United States (1827)
- History and Antiquities of New Haven (1831)
- Religious Events (1832)
- Historical Collections of Connecticut (1836)
- Historical Collections of Massachusetts (Worcester, 1839)
- A History of the Amistad Captives, coauthored by E.L. Barber (New Haven, 1840)
- History and Antiquities of New England, New York, and New Jersey (1841)
- Historical Collections of New York, coauthored by Henry Howe, of New Haven (1841)
- Elements of General History (New Haven, 1844)
- Historical Collections of New Jersey, coauthored by Henry Howe, of New Haven (1844)
- Historical Collections of Virginia, coauthored by Henry Howe, of New Haven (1844)
- Incidents in American History (New York, 1847)
- Historical Collections of Ohio, coauthored by Henry Howe, of New Haven (1847)
- Religious Emblems and Allegories (1848)
- Historical, Poetical, and Pictorial American Scenes, coauthored by Elizabeth G. Barber (1850)
- European Historical Collections (1855)
- Our Whole Country, Historical and Descriptive (Cincinnati, 1861)
- The Bible Looking Glass (Philadelphia, 1874)
- The Picture Preacher with Henry Howe (Philadelphia, 1880)
