= Brian Sullivan (ice hockey) =

American ice hockey player (born 1969)

- Born: April 23, 1969 (age 55); South Windsor, Connecticut, U.S.
- Height: 6 ft 4 in (193 cm)
- Weight: 195 lb (88 kg; 13 st 13 lb)
- Position: Right wing
- Shot: Right
- Played for: New Jersey Devils
- NHL draft: 65th overall, 1987; New Jersey Devils
- Playing career: 1991–1999

Brian Scott Sullivan (born April 23, 1969) is an American former professional ice hockey right winger who played two games in the National Hockey League with the New Jersey Devils during the 1992–93 season.

== Early life ==
Sullivan was born in South Windsor, Connecticut. As a youth, he played in the 1980 Quebec International Pee-Wee Hockey Tournament with a minor ice hockey team from Middlesex County, Connecticut.

Sullivan attended Northeastern University and played on the Northeastern Huskies men's ice hockey team. He finished his junior season with 24 goals and 21 assists in only 34 games.

== Career ==
Sullivan played two games in the National Hockey League with the New Jersey Devils during the 1992–93 season. The rest of his career, which lasted from 1991 to 1999, was spent in the minor leagues.

== Career statistics ==
=== Regular season and playoffs ===
			Regular season					Playoffs
Season	Team	League	GP	G	A	Pts	PIM	GP	G	A	Pts	PIM
1983–84	South Windsor High School	HS-CT	21	15	11	26	—	—	—	—	—	—
1984–85	South Windsor High School	HS-CT	20	24	19	43	—	—	—	—	—	—
1985–86	South Windsor High School	HS-CT	22	39	50	89	—	—	—	—	—	—
1986–87	Springfield Olympics	NEJHL	50	30	35	65	—	—	—	—	—	—
1987–88	Northeastern University	HE	37	20	12	32	18	—	—	—	—	—
1988–89	Northeastern University	HE	34	13	14	27	65	—	—	—	—	—
1989–90	Northeastern University	HE	34	24	21	45	72	—	—	—	—	—
1990–91	Northeastern University	HE	32	17	23	40	75	—	—	—	—	—
1991–92	Utica Devils	AHL	70	23	24	47	58	4	0	4	4	6
1992–93	New Jersey Devils	NHL	2	0	1	1	0	—	—	—	—	—
1992–93	Utica Devils	AHL	75	30	27	57	88	5	0	0	0	12
1993–94	Albany River Rats	AHL	77	31	30	61	140	5	1	1	2	18
1994–95	San Diego Gulls	IHL	74	24	23	47	97	5	0	1	1	7
1995–96	HC Fassa	ITA	29	15	18	33	81	3	0	1	1	10
1996–97	San Antonio Dragons	IHL	77	22	24	46	115	9	1	2	3	11
1997–98	Grand Rapids Griffins	IHL	54	12	7	19	49	—	—	—	—	—
1997–98	Springfield Falcons	AHL	11	2	4	6	29	1	0	0	0	0
1998–99	Kansas City Blades	IHL	2	0	0	0	0	—	—	—	—	—
1998–99	Houston Aeros	IHL	53	9	7	16	32	—	—	—	—	—
IHL totals			260	67	61	128	293	14	1	3	4	18
NHL totals			2	0	1	1	0	—	—	—	—	—
