= Connecticut Route 74 =

State highway in northeastern Connecticut, US

Route 74
- Map of northeastern Connecticut with Route 74 highlighted in red

Route information
- Maintained by CTDOT
- Length: 22.21 mi (35.74 km)
- Existed: 1932–present

Major junctions
- West end: Route 194 in South Windsor
- Route 83 in Vernon; Route 30 in Vernon; I-84 in Tolland; Route 32 in Willington
- East end: US 44 in Ashford

Location
- Country: United States
- State: Connecticut
- Counties: Hartford, Tolland, Windham

Highway system
- Connecticut State Highway System; Interstate; US; State; SSR; SR; Scenic
← Route 73	→ Route 75

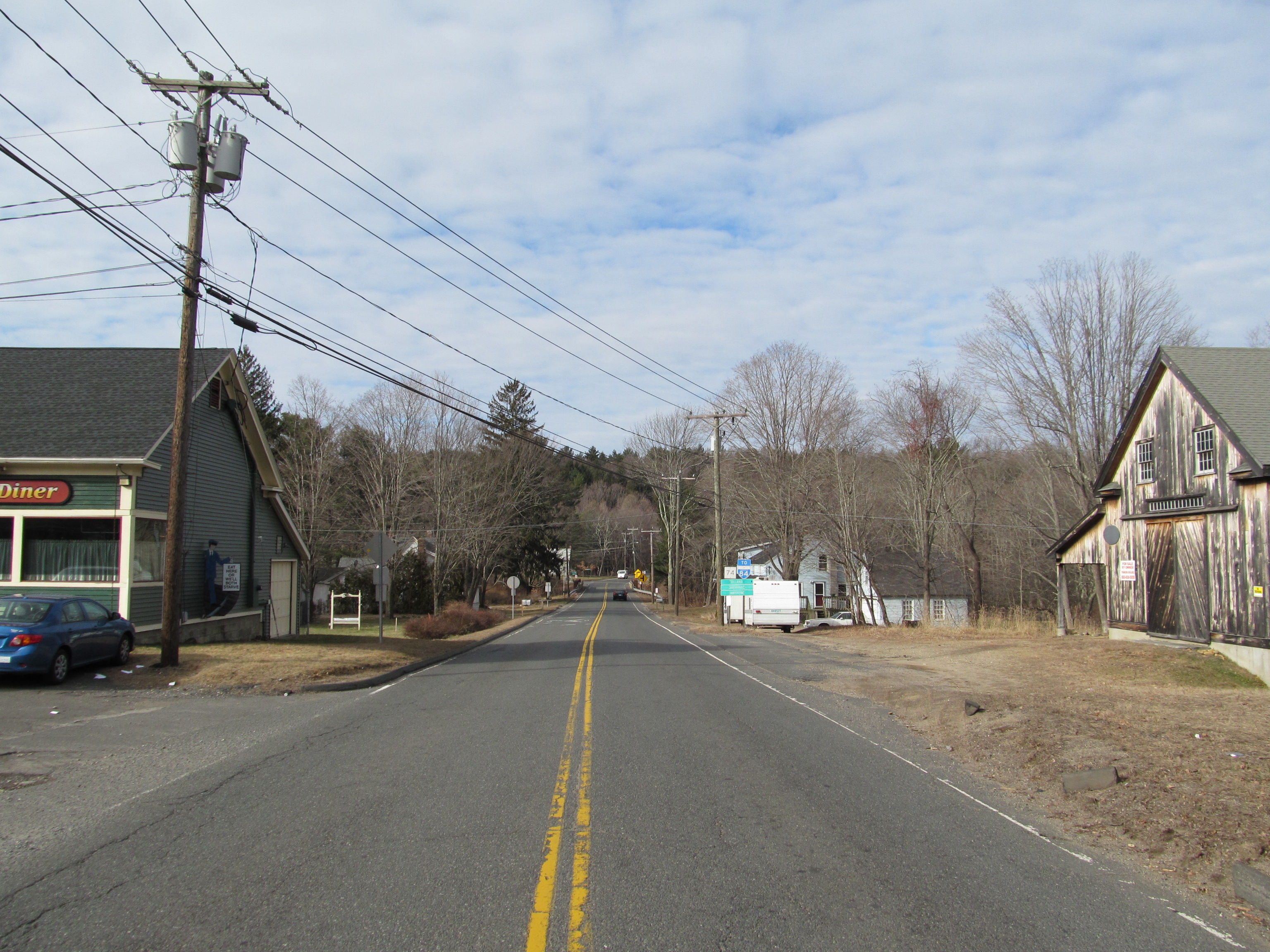
Westbound in Willington

Route 74 is a state highway in Connecticut in the eastern part of the Greater Hartford area. It runs from Route 194 in South Windsor to US 44 in Ashford, going through the towns of Ellington, Vernon, Tolland, and Willington. East of its Junction with I-84, it becomes a rural collector road.

== Route description ==
Route 74 begins at an intersection with Route 194 in South Windsor and proceeds northeastward into the southwestern part of Ellington. In Ellington, it continues northeastward and then loops southeastward into Vernon. In Vernon, Route 74 becomes Windsorville Road and continues to a concurrency with Route 83 through the west end of the village of Rockville. When Route 83 turns to the north at West Street, Route 74 continues eastward towards Tolland. In Tolland, Route 74 continues east through town, with a brief concurrency with Route 30. Just prior to the Willington town line, it crosses I-84. In Willington, Route 74 continues eastward, with a brief concurrency with Route 320 in the center of town, and continues into Ashford. In Ashford, Route 74 continues southeastward to its terminus at an intersection with US 44.

== History ==
The eastern half of modern Route 74 (east of Tolland center) was originally laid out as a turnpike in 1809 known as the Tolland County Turnpike. The turnpike ran from Ellington center, through Tolland and Willington, to the village of West Ashford, ending at the Boston Turnpike. The turnpike corporation collected tolls until 1834 when the corporation was dissolved. In 1922, the turnpike route between Tolland and West Ashford and the road between Rockville and Tolland was designated as State Highway 107. Route 74 was commissioned in the 1932 state highway renumbering from old Highway 107 and ran from Route 83 in Rockville to US 44 (then Route 101) in Ashford. In 1948, the section from I-84 in Tolland to US 44 was transferred to US 44, which had been relocated to the new Wilbur Cross Highway between Manchester and Tolland. In 1963, Route 74 was extended west to the intersection of Routes 30 and 194 and Buckland Road in South Windsor center. The transfer of I-84 was reversed on December 1, 1982 with the connection of Interstate 84 with I-384 and the southward rerouting of US 44 to its original surface route. In 1993, for safety reasons, the western terminus was moved slightly north to its current location.

== Junction list ==
County	Location	mi	km	Destinations	Notes
Hartford	South Windsor	0.00	0.00	Route 194 – South Windsor, Windsor	Western terminus
Tolland	Ellington	4.23	6.81	Route 286 north – Ellington	Southern terminus of Route 286
Tolland	Vernon	5.01	8.06	Route 83 south – Talcottville, Manchester	Western end of Route 83 concurrency
Tolland	Vernon	5.82	9.37	Route 83 north – Ellington, Somers	Eastern end of Route 83 concurrency
Tolland	Vernon	7.03	11.31	Route 31 south – Coventry	Northern terminus of Route 31
Tolland	Tolland	8.95	14.40	Route 30 south – Vernon	Western end of Route 30 concurrency
Tolland	Tolland	9.09	14.63	Route 30 north – West Stafford	Eastern end of Route 30 concurrency
Tolland	Tolland	11.21	18.04	Route 195 south – Storrs, Willimantic	Northern terminus of Route 195
Tolland	Tolland	14.57	23.45	I-84 – Hartford, Boston	Exit 84 on I-84; former I-86
Tolland	Willington	15.32	24.66	Route 32 – Stafford Springs, Mansfield	
Tolland	Willington	17.18	27.65	Route 320 north – Willington	Western end of Route 320 concurrency
Tolland	Willington	17.35	27.92	Route 320 south – Mansfield	Eastern end of Route 320 concurrency
Windham	Ashford	22.21	35.74	US 44 – Mansfield, Putnam	Eastern terminus
1.000 mi = 1.609 km; 1.000 km = 0.621 mi
