= Connecticut Route 320 =

State highway in Tolland County, Connecticut, US

Route 320
- Map of Tolland County in northern Connecticut with Route 320 highlighted in red

Route information
- Maintained by CTDOT
- Length: 7.05 mi (11.35 km)
- Existed: 1963–present

Major junctions
- South end: Route 195 in Mansfield
- North end: I-84 in Willington

Location
- Country: United States
- State: Connecticut
- Counties: Tolland

Highway system
- Connecticut State Highway System; Interstate; US; State; SSR; SR; Scenic
← Route 319	→ Route 322

Route 320 is a state highway in northeastern Connecticut, running from Mansfield to Willington and primarily serving as a northern link to the University of Connecticut.

== Route description ==
Route 320 begins as Willington Hill Road at an intersection with Route 195 at the Mansfield Four Corners intersection and heads north into the town of Willington. In Willington center, it continues north, briefly overlapping Route 74 (Tolland Turnpike), then continues north as Ruby Road to I-84. Past the I-84 overpass, Route 320 turns onto Lohse Road for another 0.1 mi (0.16 km) and officially ends at the westbound I-84 off-ramp.

== History ==
Route 320 was commissioned in 1963 from former SR 520 and has had no significant changes since. SR 520 itself was assigned to former town roads in Willington and Mansfield only the year before as part of the 1962 Route Reclassification Act.

== Junction list ==
The entire route is in Tolland County.

Location	mi	km	Destinations	Notes
Mansfield	0.00	0.00	Route 195 – Tolland, Storrs	Southern terminus
Willington	3.39	5.46	Route 74 east – Ashford	Southern end of Route 74 concurrency
Willington	3.56	5.73	Route 74 west – Tolland	Northern end of Route 74 concurrency
Willington	7.05	11.35	I-84 – Hartford, Boston	Northern terminus; exit 87 on I-84; former I-86
1.000 mi = 1.609 km; 1.000 km = 0.621 mi
