= South Windsor Public Schools =

School district in Connecticut, United States

Address
- 1737 Main Street South Windsor, Connecticut 06074 United States

District information
- Type: Public
- Motto: Dream · Achieve · Inspire
- Grades: Pre K-12
- Superintendent: Kate Carter, Ed.D.

Other information
- Website: http://www.southwindsorschools.org/

South Windsor Public Schools is a School District serving the town of South Windsor, Connecticut. It also allows students from Hartford, Connecticut, to attend Timothy Edwards Middle School and South Windsor High School through the open choice program.

== Schools ==
=== High schools ===
- South Windsor High School

=== Middle schools ===
- Timothy Edwards Middle School

=== Elementary schools ===
- Eli Terry Elementary School
- Orchard Hill Elementary School
- Philip R. Smith Elementary School
- Pleasant Valley Elementary School
