= Deborah Dillon Lightfoot =

American paralympian

- Deborah Dillon, from a 1976 newspaper
- Born: Deborah Ann Dillon; March 1, 1956; South Windsor, Connecticut
- Died: June 21, 2007 (aged 51); Lincoln, California
- Occupations: Athlete, information systems analyst
- Known for: 1976 Paralympic Games, 1977 Stoke Mandeville Games, 1978 Pan American Games

Deborah Dillon Lightfoot (March 1, 1956 – June 21, 2007) was an American wheelchair athlete. She was the third woman inducted into the National Wheelchair Basketball Hall of Fame in 2001.

== Early life and education ==
Deborah Ann Dillon was born in South Windsor, Connecticut, the daughter of Thomas J. Dillon and Patricia Sullivan Dillon. In February 1971, at age 14, she injured her spinal cord in a sledding accident, and became quadriplegic. Two years later, she was a delegate to the National 4-H Congress in Chicago. She also wrote articles about 4-H Club activities for the Hartford Courant.

Dillon graduated from South Windsor High School in 1974, and attended the University of Illinois, where she played on the wheelchair basketball team and won medals in track and field events, including pentathlon, at the National Wheelchair Games in 1976, 1977 and 1978. She and teammate Sharon Hedrick were among the first wheelchair athletes to win the school's George Huff Award for student athletes.

Dillon graduated from the University of Illinois in 1979, and earned a master's degree at San Jose State University in 1980.

== Career ==
While she was a college student, Dillon was a member of the United States team at the 1976 Paralympic Games in Toronto. She also represented the United States as an athlete at the Stoke Mandeville Games in England in 1977, and at the Pan American Games in Rio de Janeiro in 1978.

Dillon Lightfoot was an information systems analyst with the California Department of Health Services. She continued active in sports in adulthood, as a founding member of the Bay Area Meteorites (a women's basketball team). She also played with the Sacramento Gold Rush. She was secretary of the National Wheelchair Basketball Association (NWBA) from 1982 to 2000, and in 2001 became the third woman inducted in the NWBA's Hall of Fame.

== Personal life ==
Dillon married David H. Lightfoot in 1992. She died from cancer in Lincoln, California in 2007, aged 51 years. In 2015, she was posthumously inducted into the South Windsor High School Hall of Fame.
