= TicketsNow =

Online ticket retailer founded in 1992

- Type: Subsidiary
- Industry: Online ticketing
- Founded: 1992
- Headquarters: Rolling Meadows, Illinois, U.S
- Owner: Live Nation Entertainment
- Parent: Ticketmaster Entertainment

TicketsNow was an online ticket retailer. It was founded in 1992 by Mike Domek and headquartered in Woodstock, Illinois.

== History ==
Founded by Mike Domek in 1992, the company was originally known as VIP Tour Company before being rebranded as TicketsNow in 1999.

TicketsNow was named in 2004 and 2006 to the Inc. 500, which includes the top 10% of the published Inc. 5000 index of the fastest-growing privately held companies in the U.S. TicketsNow is a founding member of the National Association of Ticket Brokers (NATB), which promotes ethics in the secondary ticketing marketplace.

In February 2008, TicketsNow was acquired by Ticketmaster for $265 million and currently operates as a wholly owned, independently operated subsidiary.

TicketsNow has a few major competitors. These competitors include StubHub, TicketNetwork, Seatgeek, Vivid Seats.

== 2009 Controversy ==
In 2009, suspicion arose when consumers attempting to purchase tickets to a Bruce Springsteen concert were instantly redirected from Ticketmaster.com to TicketsNow and saw the same tickets being sold at premium prices. As a ticket broker owned by Ticketmaster, rumors abounded that Ticketmaster conspired to divert buyers away from the main site at normal prices towards the broker site at inflated prices. Springsteen and the E Street Band referred to the controversy as "a pure conflict of interest".

== See also ==
- Ticket resale
