= Henry Howe =

American historian

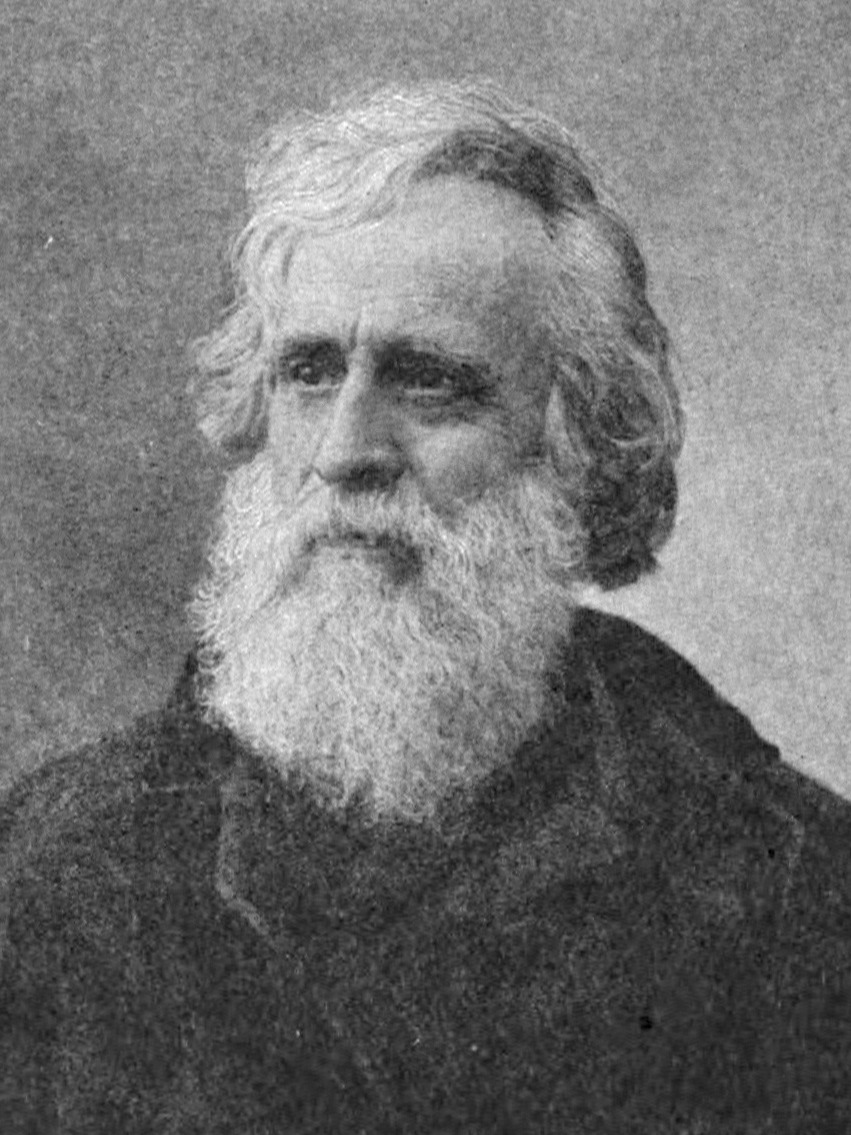
- Howe in 1886
- Born: October 11, 1816; New Haven, Connecticut, U.S.
- Died: October 14, 1893 (aged 77); Columbus, Ohio, U.S.
- Resting place: Green Lawn Cemetery, Columbus, Ohio

Henry Howe (October 11, 1816 – October 14, 1893) was an American author who wrote histories of several states in the United States. His most celebrated work is the three volume Historical Collections of Ohio.

== Early life ==
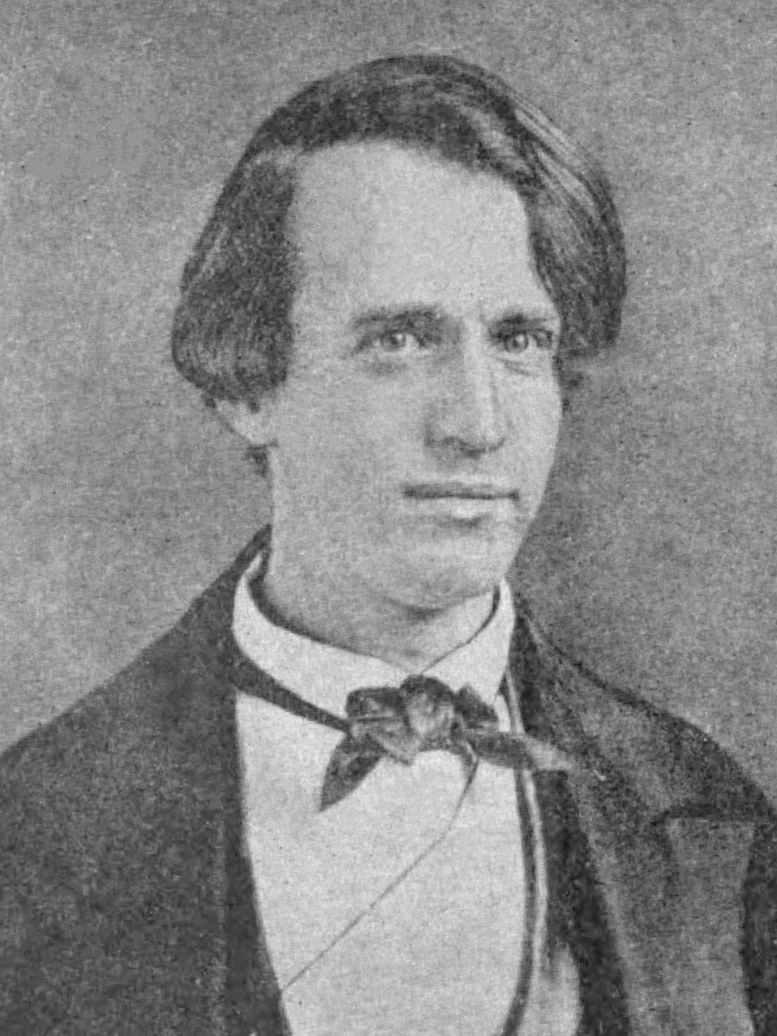
Howe in 1846

Henry Howe was born in New Haven, Connecticut, the son of a publisher and printer, whose bookstore was one of the most famous in the country. His father, Hezekiah Howe, published the first edition of Noah Webster's American Dictionary of the English Language in 1828. The younger Howe learned the printing trade, and wrote for local newspapers. He went to New York to work in his uncle's bank.

== Writing career ==
A copy of Historical Collections of Connecticut by John Warner Barber came into the senior Howe's bookstore in 1838. Barber had traveled across the state making sketches and collecting material. This book impressed Henry Howe, who wrote later "Although born in an atmosphere of books, this impressed me more than any book I had ever seen, and I felt that I would like of all things to dedicate my life to traveling and making such books. ... Two years had passed; in the interim my father had died. ... The spring of 1840 had arrived, when one day I walked into Mr. Barber's office and inquired if he had thought of making a book on New York State." Thus began a partnership, where each would travel about the state, taking notes and drawing pictures.

The Historical Collections of New York came out in 1841, and was profitable at sale of 10,000. By 1842, Howe was crossing New Jersey, and the Historical Collections of New Jersey came out that year. After this point, Mr. Barber acted only as engraver for Mr. Howe. In 1845, Howe started his Virginia project. It came out in 1845, had good sales, but was not profitable.

The Ohio effort began January 1846 in Marietta, Ohio, and Howe intended to walk across the state, but bought a broken-down horse after 100 miles. Howe always gave credit for the source of his information. With Ohio settled for only a half century, many of the original history makers were still around to interview. Howe returned to New Haven in February 1847, and published Historical Collections of Ohio in September. More than 18,000 copies were sold of this first edition, the best seller of histories in Ohio for the 19th century, besting even Ulysses S. Grant's memoirs.

Howe was married September 1848, and moved to Cincinnati, where he wrote The Great West, Achievement of Americans, Life and Death on the Ocean and Travels and Adventures of Celebrated Travelers.

In 1856, he began his epic work, a series called Our Whole Country. It was not issued until the month Fort Sumter fell, marking the beginning of the Civil War, and people were living history, not reading it. The book was a financial disaster. His Times of the Rebellion in the West, published shortly after the war, was very profitable. In the 1870s he reprinted his older works, and was often asked by influential Ohioans to update his Collections.

In 1885, Howe did not have the money necessary to begin a tour of Ohio, so he was the first American to try the concept of advanced paying subscriptions, selling copies for $10, four years in advance of publication. He began a tour at President Hayes' home in Fremont November 21, 1885, and finished March 1887. It took two years before the first volume was issued, which was highly acclaimed, but sold poorly. He applied to the Ohio Legislature for assistance, and they bought 1200 copies for $12,000, allowing him to complete the three volume set, instead of the two originally planned, in 1891. Sales lagged, because everyone expected the State to give copies to schools and libraries. Howe was deeply in debt from the project when he died in October 1893. The State, in the 71st General Assembly, agreed to buy the copyright and printing plates for $20,000, due to a petition from Senators Sherman, Brice, and Thurman, Governors Cox, Foster, Foraker, and McKinley, and many others, relieving Howe's widow of debt. The state re-printed the books for a number of years.

== Publications ==
(dates not necessarily first editions)

- Barber, John; Howe, Henry (1865). The Loyal West in the Times of the Rebellion; also, Before and Since: Being an Encyclopedia and Panorama of the Western States, Pacific States and Territories of the Union, Historical, Geographical, and Pictorial, Illustrated by more than two hundred Engravings, presenting views of all the Cities and Principal Towns Public Buildings and Monuments Battle-fields — Historic localities natural curiosities, and scenes, Illustrating the times of the Rebellion, etc., Principally from Drawings taken on the spot by the Authors. Henry Howe. p. 764.
- Howe, Henry (1907). Historical Collections of Ohio, The Ohio Centennial Edition. Vol. 1. The State of Ohio. ISBN 9781404753761.
- Howe, Henry (1907). Historical Collections of Ohio, The Ohio Centennial Edition. Vol. 2. The State of Ohio.
- Howe, Henry (1907). Historical Collections of Ohio, The Ohio Centennial Edition. Vol. 3. The State of Ohio.
- Barber, John Warner; Howe, Henry (1842). Historical collections of the state of New York: containing a general ... New Haven Connecticut: S. Tuttle.
- Barber, John Warner; Howe, Henry (1844). Historical collections of the state of New Jersey: containing a general ... Newark NJ: Benjamin Olds.
- Howe, Henry (1852). Historical collections of Virginia: containing a collection of the most ... Charleston SC: William R Babcock. ISBN 9780722209158.
- Howe, Henry (1854). Historical collections of the Great West: containing narratives of the most ... Cincinnati: Henry Howe.
- Howe, Henry (1842). Memoirs of the most eminent American mechanics: also, lives of distinguished ... New York: Alexander V. Blake.
- Howe, Henry (1861). Adventures and achievements of Americans: a series of narratives ... Cincinnati: Henry Howe.
- Barber, John Warner; Howe, Henry (1861). Our whole country, or, The past and present of the United States: historical ... Cincinnati: Henry Howe.
