= Abner Reed =

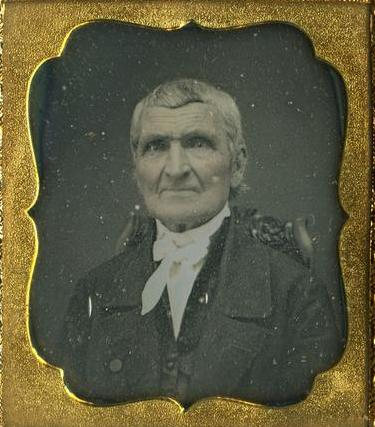
Photo of Abner Reed

Abner Reed (1771–1866) was an American engraver, educator, and author.

Born in East Windsor, Connecticut, he engraved saddle plates and bank notes. He wrote Love Triumphant or Constancy Rowarded and the children's book First Steps in Learning.

He kept a diary of his activities in Windsor as a deacon and teacher. He noted a riot and "independence" for "Negroes".

Reed drew and engraved Jonathan Edwards, president of Nassau Hall College, in 1808. He engraved a 1813 map of Connecticut. He engraved images of George Washington.

His home is at 932 Main Street in what is now South Windsor. It is part of the Windsor Farms Historic District. He taught John Warner Barber.

Reed died in Toledo, Ohio.
