= Connecticut Route 275 =

State highway in Tolland County, Connecticut, US

Route 275
- Map of Tolland County in northern Connecticut with Route 275 highlighted in red

Route information
- Maintained by CTDOT
- Length: 4.15 mi (6.68 km)
- Existed: 1963–present

Major junctions
- West end: Route 31 in Coventry
- East end: Route 195 in Mansfield

Location
- Country: United States
- State: Connecticut
- Counties: Tolland

Highway system
- Connecticut State Highway System; Interstate; US; State; SSR; SR; Scenic
← Route 272	→ I-284

Route 275 is a state highway in northeastern Connecticut running from Coventry to the village of Storrs within the town of Mansfield, and serving as a western feeder to the main campus of the University of Connecticut.

== Route description ==
Route 275 begins as Stone House Road at an intersection with Route 31 in the town center of Coventry. It heads northeast for 1.7 miles (2.7 km) to the Willimantic River, crossing into the village of Eagleville within the town of Mansfield. In Mansfield, the road becomes known as South Eagleville Road. After intersecting with Route 32 in Eagleville, Route 275 continues east-northeast another two miles (3 km) until it ends at an intersection with Route 195 at "Downtown Storrs", the southern end and commercial zone of the main campus of the University of Connecticut in Storrs. Route 275 carries an average of 2,300 vehicles per day between Coventry and Eagleville, and 4,500 vehicles per day between Eagleville and Storrs.

== History ==
Prior to 1963, the road connecting Eagleville to Storrs (South Eagleville Road) had been an unsigned state road (SR 575). The westward continuation into Coventry (Stonehouse Road) had been town-maintained and unnumbered. The state took over maintenance of Stonehouse Road (as an extension of SR 575) in 1962 as part of the Route Reclassification Act. Route 275 was designated at the beginning of 1963 from former SR 575. At an unconfirmed date after 1967, the section in the vicinity of the Coventry-Mansfield town line was realigned.

== Junction list ==
The entire route is in Tolland County.

Location	mi	km	Destinations	Notes
Coventry	0.00	0.00	Route 31 – Coventry, Willimantic	Western terminus
Mansfield	2.01	3.23	Route 32	
Mansfield	4.15	6.68	Route 195 – Willimantic	Eastern terminus
1.000 mi = 1.609 km; 1.000 km = 0.621 mi
