= Historical Collections of Ohio =

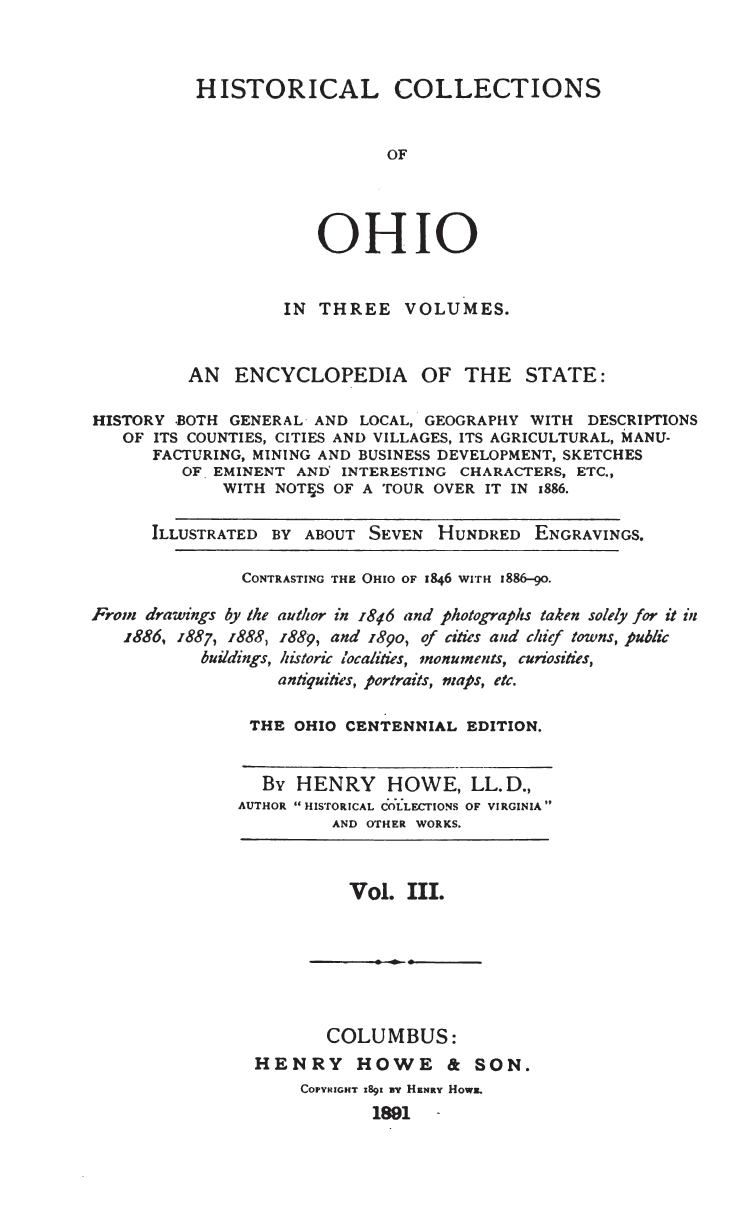

Historical Collections of Ohio is a work of history published in one volume in 1847 by Henry Howe (1816–1893). Howe had spent more than a year traveling across the state of Ohio making sketches, interviewing people, and collecting data. The first edition sold more than 18,000 copies.

In the 1870s, many influential Ohioans asked Howe to update his work with another tour. In 1885, Howe did not have the money necessary to begin a tour of Ohio, so he tried the concept of publication by subscription, selling copies for $10, four years in advance of publication.

Howe began a tour at President Hayes' home in Fremont Nov 21, 1885, and finished March 1887. It took two years before the first volume was issued, which was highly acclaimed, but sold poorly. He applied to the Ohio Legislature for assistance, and they bought 1200 copies for $12,000, allowing him to complete the three volume set, instead of the two originally planned, in 1891. Sales lagged, because everyone expected the State to give copies to schools and libraries. Howe was deeply in debt from the project when he died in October, 1893. The State, in the 71st General Assembly, agreed to buy the copyright and printing plates for $20,000, due to a petition from Senators Sherman, Brice, and Thurman, Governors Cox, Foster, Foraker, and McKinley, and many others, relieving Howe's widow of debt. The state re-printed the books for a number of years.

== Online copies ==
- Howe, Henry (1907). Historical Collections of Ohio, The Ohio Centennial Edition. Vol. 1. The State of Ohio.
- Howe, Henry (1907). Historical Collections of Ohio, The Ohio Centennial Edition. Vol. 2. The State of Ohio.
- Howe, Henry (1907). Historical Collections of Ohio, The Ohio Centennial Edition. Vol. 3. The State of Ohio.
