= Connecticut Route 195 =

State highway in northeastern Connecticut, US

Route 195
- Map of northeastern Connecticut with Route 195 highlighted in red

Route information
- Maintained by CTDOT
- Length: 15.91 mi (25.60 km)
- Existed: 1932–present

Major junctions
- South end: Route 66 in Windham
- US 6 in Mansfield; US 44 in Mansfield Depot; Route 32 in Willington; I-84 in Tolland
- North end: Route 74 in Tolland

Location
- Country: United States
- State: Connecticut
- Counties: Windham, Tolland

Highway system
- Connecticut State Highway System; Interstate; US; State; SSR; SR; Scenic
← Route 194	→ Route 196

Route 195 is a state highway in northeastern Connecticut, running from the Willimantic section of Windham to the town center of Tolland via Storrs and Mansfield Center. The road is the main thoroughfare to access the main campus of the University of Connecticut.

== Route description ==
Route 195 begins as Ash Street and Jackson Street at an intersection with Route 66 in the Willimantic section of Windham. It heads north, crossing into Mansfield, where it becomes Storrs Road and continues past the Natchaug River. It soon has an interchange with US 6 before turning northwest at the Willimantic Reservoir. Route 195 then enters the village of Storrs, passing the eastern end of Route 275 before entering the University of Connecticut campus. North of campus at the Mansfield Four Corners intersection, it intersects US 44, then meets the southern end of Route 320 and intersects Route 32 before continuing across the Willimantic River into the town of Coventry, where it is known as Tolland Turnpike. Route 195 cuts across the northeast corner of Coventry into Tolland, where it becomes Merrow Road and continues northwest, intersecting I-84 before ending at an intersection with Route 74.

The section of Route 195 from the Windham-Mansfield town line to I-84 in Tolland is designated UConn Husky Way.

== History ==
Route 195 follows the route of the Windham and Mansfield Turnpike, a stage road active from 1800 to after 1828. The turnpike route between Mansfield Center and Storrs was designated as part of State Highway 146 in 1922, running from Willimantic to Mansfield Center via modern Route 89, then to US 44 in Storrs via modern Route 195. Route 195 was established in the 1932 state highway renumbering from most of old Highway 146 in Mansfield. In 1963, it was extended to the current northern terminus along a new road (the southern part of old Tolland and Mansfield Turnpike). In 1964, part of Route 89 was transferred to Route 195, resulting in Route 195's current route.

== Junction list ==
County	Location	mi	km	Destinations	Notes
Windham	Windham	0.00	0.00	Route 66 – North Windham, Columbia	Southern terminus
Tolland	Mansfield	1.22	1.96	US 6 – North Windham, Columbia	
Tolland	Mansfield	3.74	6.02	Route 89 north – Ashford	Southern terminus of Route 89
Tolland	Mansfield	7.11	11.44	Route 275 west – Coventry	Eastern terminus of Route 275
Tolland	Mansfield	9.39	15.11	US 44 – Putnam, Bolton	
Tolland	Mansfield	9.46	15.22	Route 320 north – Willington	Southern terminus of Route 320
Tolland	Mansfield	11.66	18.76	Route 32 – Stafford Springs, Willimantic	
Tolland	Tolland	15.20	24.46	I-84 – Boston, Hartford	Exit 68 on I-84; former I-86
Tolland	Tolland	15.91	25.60	Route 74 – Willington, Rockville	Northern terminus
1.000 mi = 1.609 km; 1.000 km = 0.621 mi
