= TicketNetwork =

Live entertainment ticket marketplace

- Type: Private
- Industry: Live Entertainment
- Founded: 2002
- Headquarters: South Windsor, Connecticut, USA
- Key people: Don Vaccaro (CEO)
- Products: Ticket technology, ticket exchange
- Website: www.ticketnetwork.com

TicketNetwork is an American online ticket marketplace and ticketing technology company based in South Windsor, Connecticut. The company connects buyers and sellers of tickets for concerts, sporting events, theater performances, and other live entertainment events.

TicketNetwork originated in 1996, and TicketNetwork.com was launched in 2002 by ticket broker Don Vaccaro and software developer Doug Kruse. The company operates several online ticket marketplaces and provides ticketing technology, inventory management software, and distribution services to ticket sellers and business partners.

TicketNetwork offers all-in pricing, with ticket prices displayed inclusive of applicable fees. The company is also an MLB Authorized Ticket Marketplace, participating in Major League Baseball's authorized secondary ticketing program.

== Operations ==
TicketNetwork operates under a model similar to eBay, where tickets are listed on the company's marketplace, but transactions are handled by the individual seller. Buyers are charged a service fee for tickets purchased, plus a delivery fee, depending on the method of delivery, location, and time until the event. Once the tickets are available, the seller ships them directly to the buyer. Sellers are able to list and manage tickets on the marketplace via the TicketNetwork Point of Sale software.

=== Properties ===
TicketNetwork operates several retail websites such as TicketNetwork.com and TicketLiquidator.com. It also sponsors an annual trade show called Ticket Summit, which attracts resellers and other ticket industry figures. Additionally, the company operates the Better Ticketing Association, a website containing information and resources for the ticket resale industry. TicketNetwork also sells the tickets uploaded to their marketplace with their Private Label Program which has created controversy.

=== Green Initiative ===
TicketNetwork's campus features several amenities tied to the company's "Green Initiative." A community garden covers substantial acreage of the company headquarters campus in Connecticut. It produces fruit, vegetables, and herbs that are regularly made available for staff to take home, as well as being used in the company cafeteria. There is also an animal sanctuary on the campus, which is home to several llamas, goats, geese, chickens, and pigs as of spring 2020.

In the spring of 2019, construction was completed on a 1.4MW solar system on the roof of the headquarters building. The array, which features 4,365 solar panels, is one of the largest of its kind in Connecticut and produces energy offsetting an estimated 68% of the building's electrical use.

=== Covid-19 Pandemic Response ===
In the wake of the sudden shutdown of live events during the COVID-19 pandemic, TicketNetwork rapidly enacted cost-cutting measures in order to ensure the company's continued operation through the crisis. Customers holding tickets to cancelled events were given the option of vouchers good towards future event purchases, and senior staff members unanimously agreed to a pay cut, allowing the business to avoid large layoffs despite the precipitous drop-off in sales revenue.

== Controversies ==
The ability for any seller to list tickets at any time has resulted in litigation. In 2009 New Jersey's then-Attorney General Anne Milgram filed a lawsuit against several parties, including TicketNetwork, for allegedly selling and advertising tickets before they were available from the venue. The suit was filed by Milgram following reports that primary seller Ticketmaster redirected customers to its TicketsNow website after Bruce Springsteen tickets sold out on Ticketmaster's main website. The case was dismissed in August 2010 after Judge Patricia K. Costello ruled that under federal law TicketNetwork was not liable for incorrect information about the availability of tickets because it was not the seller.

In July 2011 TicketNetwork received a $4.5 million and $1.8 million loan as part of the State of Connecticut's First Five Program, in exchange for hiring at least 200 people over two years time. TicketNetwork also received a $250,000 grant for the training of engineers. TicketNetwork was removed from this program after its then CEO, Don Vaccaro, was arrested in February 2012 following an incident at a local Academy Awards party in Hartford, Connecticut. Vaccaro took a leave of absence from the company and saw the charges eventually dismissed after completing an accelerated rehabilitation program.

In July 2019, TicketNetwork (along with Ticket Galaxy) reached a $1.55M settlement to resolve a lawsuit with the Attorney General of New York for "misleading tens of thousands of customers into purchasing speculative tickets for concerts and other live events". The lawsuit was prompted by a WNBC investigation in October 2018 into issues with sales of Broadway tickets.

In November 2023, TicketNetwork reached a settlement agreement with Canada's Competition Bureau, agreeing to pay $825,000 and make changes to its advertising practices regarding ticket prices to bring them in line with changes to the laws in that country.

== See also ==
- Ticket resale
