= Podunk River =

Stream in Connecticut, US

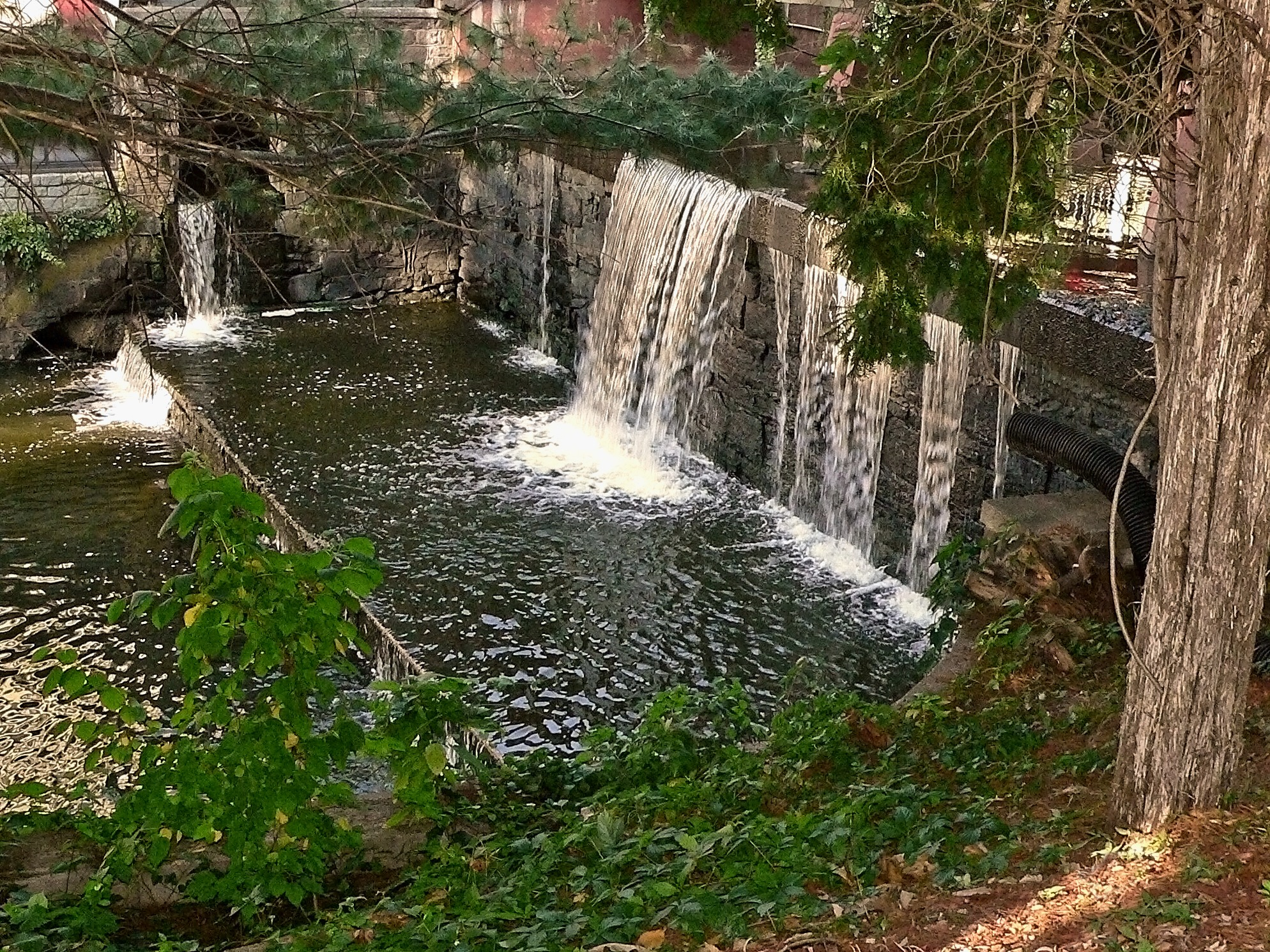
Vintons Pond Dam on the Podunk River

The Podunk River is a stream in Hartford County, Connecticut. It is a tributary to the Connecticut River.

The stream headwaters arise at 41°51′09″N 72°31′31″W at an elevation of 305 ft (93 m). The stream flows to the southwest and enters the Connecticut River just northwest of East Hartford at 41°47′08″N 72°38′37″W and an elevation of 7 ft (2.1 m).

The name is derived from the Algonquin words pod for low and unk for beyond or "the low land beyond" or along the Connecticut and its tributary the Podunk River where they farmed the fertile soil along the streams.
