= Windsor Farms Historic District =

Historic district in Connecticut, United States

- U.S. National Register of Historic Places
- U.S. Historic district
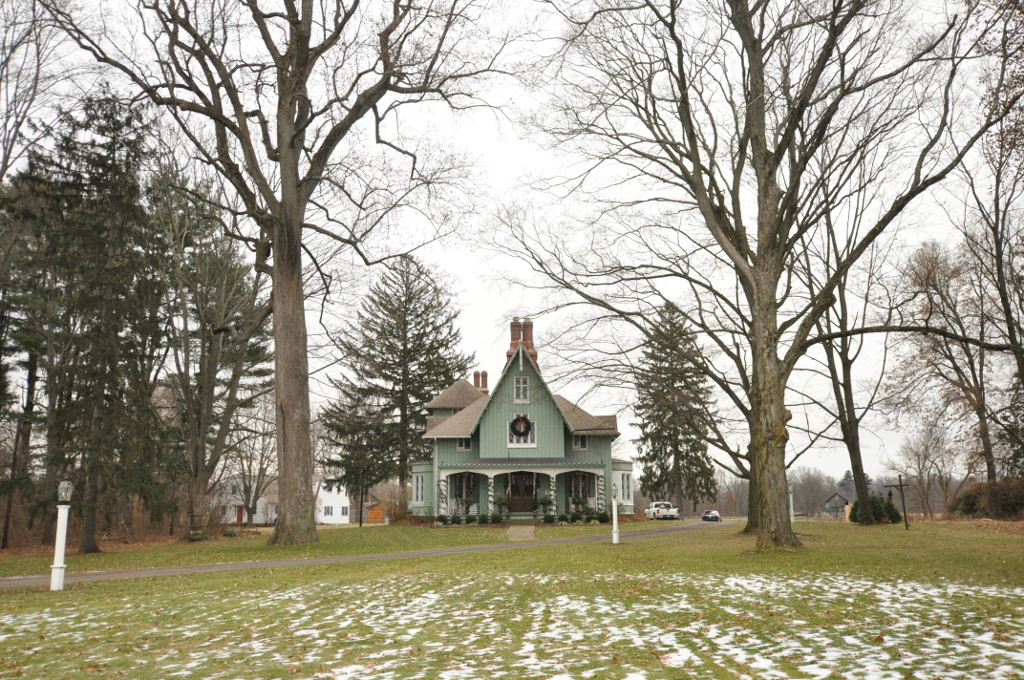
- A Gothic Revival house in the district

- Location within Connecticut Location within the United States
- Location: Roughly bounded by Strong Road, Route 5, I-291, and the Connecticut River, South Windsor, Connecticut
- Coordinates: 41°49′22″N 72°37′35″W
- Area: 1,665 acres (674 ha)
- Built: 1768
- Architectural style: Colonial Revival, Greek Revival, Late Victorian
- NRHP reference No.: 86000723
- Added to NRHP: April 11, 1986

The Windsor Farms Historic District encompasses a large historically agricultural area and the historic town center of South Windsor, Connecticut. Its built environment extends mainly along Main Street, between Interstate 291 in the south and Strong Road in the north, with a diversity of architecture spanning three centuries. The district includes agricultural fields on both sides, many of which remain in tobacco cultivation. The district was listed on the National Register of Historic Places in 1986.

== Description and history ==
South Windsor was part of Windsor, when that town was settled in the 17th century, and was separately incorporated in 1768. It was always an agricultural community, owing the rich farmlands along the Connecticut River, which separates it from its parent town. Tobacco was from an early date a significant crop, which did particularly well, and was the source of the town's fortunes in the 19th century. Tobacco farmers in the town introduced techniques for regulating temperatures in the sheds used for drying and curing tobacco, which still dot the landscape today. Shade-grown tobacco, particularly prized for use as the wrapping of cigars, was introduced in the town in 1901, and remained an important crop into the 1970s.

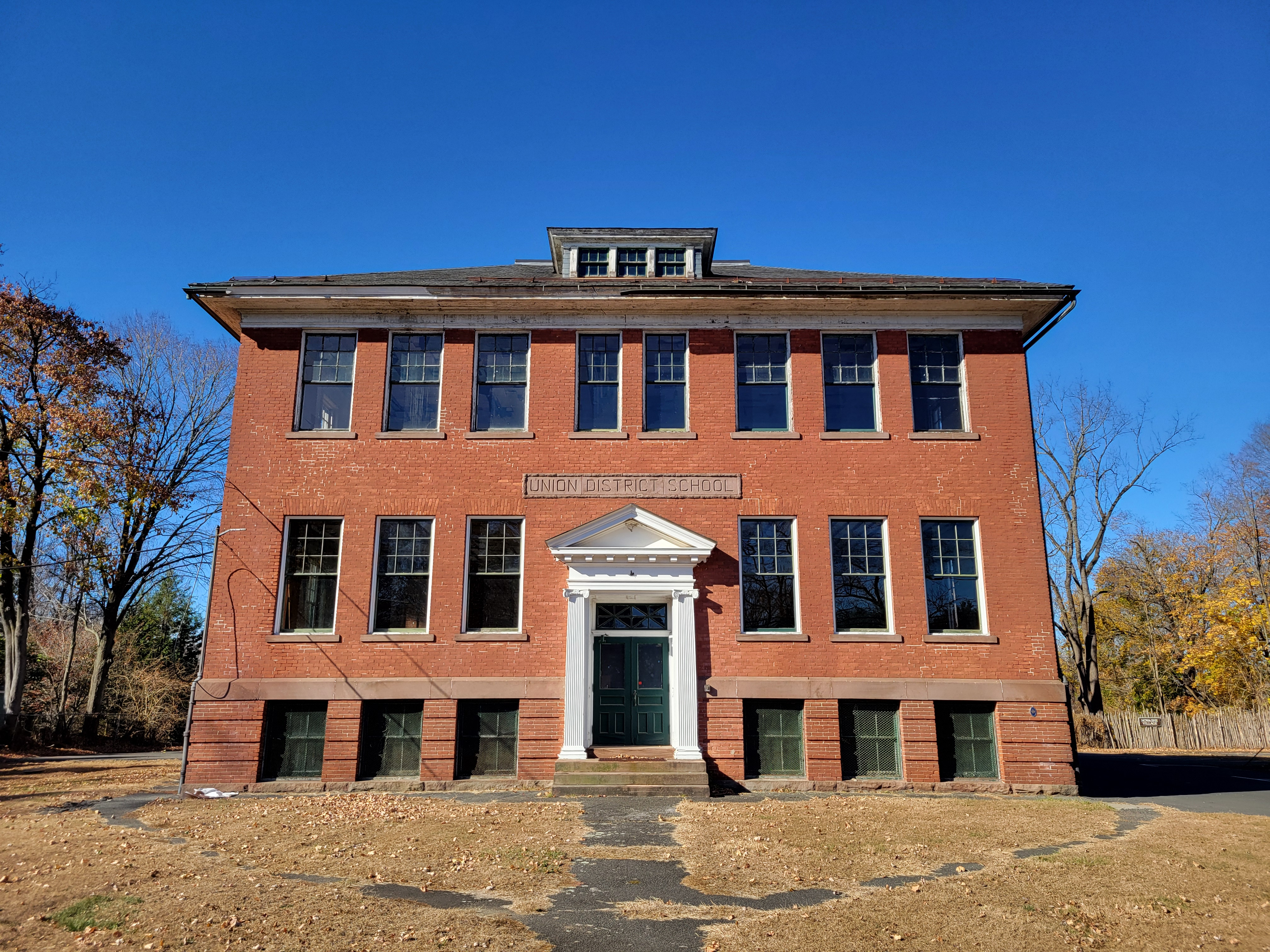
Union District School

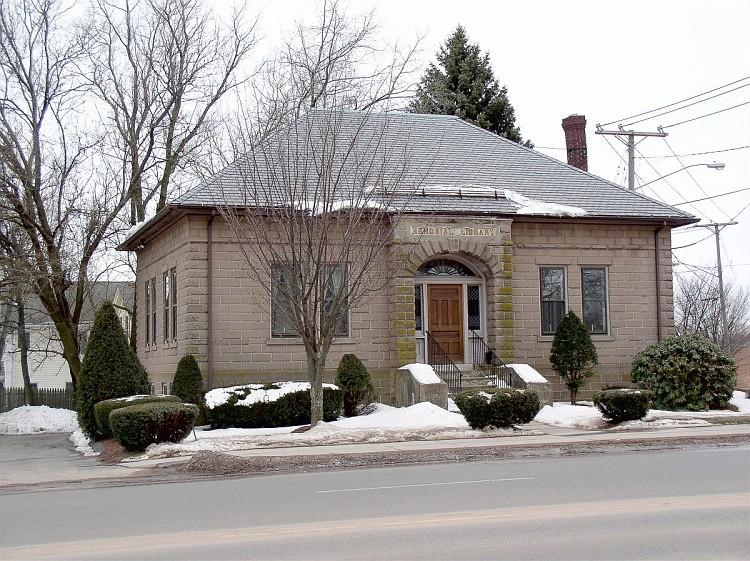
Former Sadd Memorial Library

The Windsor Farms area was the principal settlement in colonial South Windsor. It stretched along Main Street, which was laid out near the edge of a terrace above the bottomlands of the Connecticut River. Houses lined the street, with narrow strips of farmland extending west to the river, and eastward as well. The historic district encompasses all of these resources, an area over 1,600 acres (650 ha) in size. In many instances, houses have been replaced by later construction, resulting in a wide variety of architectural styles, despite some consistence in spacing and scale. The district includes the 1845 Greek Revival, First Congregational Church, a district schoolhouse also built in 1845, and the Classical Revival Wood Memorial Library building (1926). The oldest house in the district was built in 1694.

== See also ==
- East Windsor Hill Historic District, located north of this district
- National Register of Historic Places listings in Hartford County, Connecticut
