= East Windsor Hill Historic District =

Historic district in Connecticut, United States

- U.S. National Register of Historic Places
- U.S. Historic district
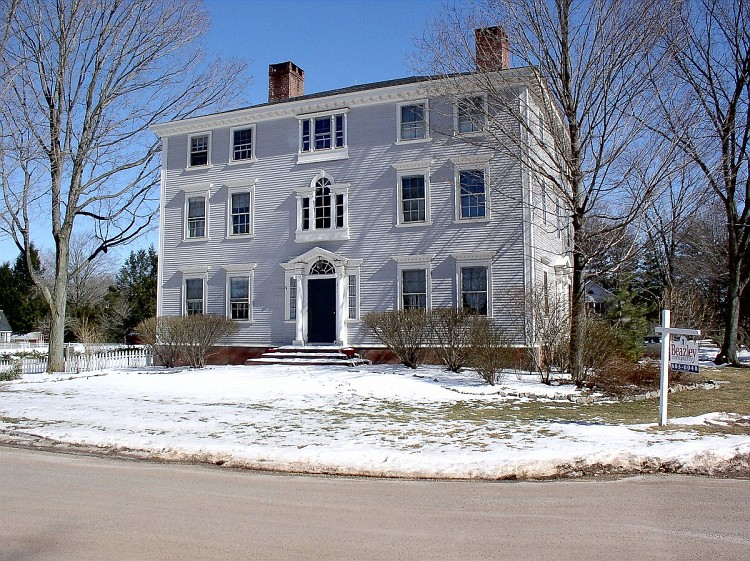
- The 1788 John Watson House

- Location within Connecticut Location within the United States
- Location: Roughly bounded by the Scantic River, John Fitch Boulevard, Sullivan Avenue, and the Connecticut River, South Windsor, Connecticut
- Coordinates: 41°51′23″N 72°36′45″W
- Area: 535 acres (217 ha)
- Built: 1633
- Architectural style: Greek Revival, Georgian, Federal
- NRHP reference No.: 86001208
- Added to NRHP: May 30, 1986

East Windsor Hill Historic District is a historic district located in the northwestern corner of the town of South Windsor, Connecticut, United States. It was listed on the National Register of Historic Places in 1986. The district runs along both sides of Main Street from the Scantic River south to the Edwards Cemetery. The district also includes areas west of Main Street to the Connecticut River, including properties along Ferry Lane. The district is located directly north of another historic district, Windsor Farms Historic District. The district encompasses a neighborhood of well-preserved largely folk vernacular buildings erected between about 1700 and 1860.

== Description and history ==
The East Windsor Hill area was settled in 1638 by families from Windsor, just across the Connecticut River to the west. The two communities were joined by the first ferry service to span that river, established in 1648 by John Bissell. The eastern end of the ferry was located at the western end of Ferry Lane, a short way south of the mouth of the Scantic River, and includes a surviving ferry tavern house dating to about 1750. Mainly agricultural in character, the village received a boost in the 1830s, when the theologically conservative Theological Institute of Connecticut was established here. Although none of its academic buildings survive, homes of people associated with the institution do.

The architecture of the East Windsor Hill village is diverse, representing over 150 years of largely vernacular domestic architecture. Several houses were built in the high Federal style, typically for merchants who were dealing in the area's agricultural products. A number of locally well-known builders constructed houses in the village, and there are several fine instances of the elaborate carved doorway surrounds for which the Connecticut River valley is well known. Probably the finest example of Greek Revival architecture in the district is the 1835 high-style home of Bennett Tyler, the first president of the Theological Institute.

== See also ==
- National Register of Historic Places listings in Hartford County, Connecticut
