= Storrs, Connecticut =

Census-designated place in Connecticut, US

Storrs
- Census-designated place
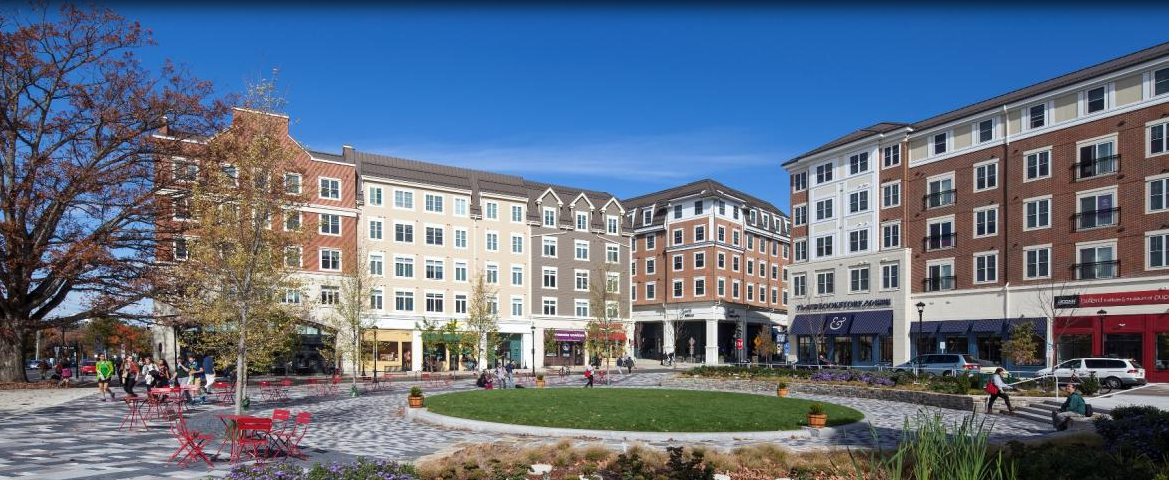
- Downtown Storrs

- Coordinates: 41°48′30″N 72°14′58″W
- Country: United States
- U.S. state: Connecticut
- County: Tolland
- Region: Capitol Region
- Town: Mansfield

Area
  - Total: 5.7 sq mi (14.8 km^{2})
  - Land: 5.7 sq mi (14.7 km^{2})
  - Water: 0.039 sq mi (0.1 km^{2})
- Elevation: 636 ft (194 m)

Population (2020)
  - Total: 15,979
  - Density: 2,820/sq mi (1,090/km^{2})
- Time zone: UTC-5 (Eastern (EST))
  - Summer (DST): UTC-4 (EDT)
- ZIP Codes: 06268, 06269
- Area codes: 860/959
- FIPS code: 09-73980
- GNIS feature ID: 2377867

Storrs (/stɔːrz/ storz) is a village and census-designated place (CDP) in the town of Mansfield in eastern Tolland County, Connecticut, United States. The village is part of the Capitol Planning Region. The population was 15,979 at the 2020 census.

Storrs is dominated economically and demographically by the main campus of the University of Connecticut and the associated Connecticut Repertory Theatre.

== History ==
Storrs was named after Charles and Augustus Storrs, two brothers who founded the University of Connecticut (originally called the Storrs Agricultural College) by giving the land (170 acres (0.69 km^{2})) and $6,000 in 1881. In the aftermath of September 2005's Hurricane Katrina, Slate named Storrs "America's Best Place to Avoid Death Due to Natural Disaster."

== Geography ==
According to the United States Census Bureau, the community has an area of 14.9 km^{2} (5.7 mi^{2}), of which 14.7 km^{2} (5.7 mi^{2}) is land and 0.1 km^{2} (0.04 mi^{2}) (0.53%) is water.

=== Climate ===
Climate data for Windham County, Connecticut (including University of Connecticut and Storrs, Connecticut), 1991–2020 normals, extremes 1888–present
Month	Jan	Feb	Mar	Apr	May	Jun	Jul	Aug	Sep	Oct	Nov	Dec	Year
Record high °F (°C)	68 (20)	69 (21)	83 (28)	95 (35)	93 (34)	96 (36)	101 (38)	97 (36)	97 (36)	89 (32)	82 (28)	73 (23)	101 (38)
Mean maximum °F (°C)	56.4 (13.6)	55.2 (12.9)	64.1 (17.8)	77.7 (25.4)	84.1 (28.9)	87.3 (30.7)	89.8 (32.1)	87.8 (31.0)	84.0 (28.9)	76.1 (24.5)	68.2 (20.1)	59.8 (15.4)	91.6 (33.1)
Mean daily maximum °F (°C)	35.0 (1.7)	37.2 (2.9)	44.8 (7.1)	57.0 (13.9)	67.6 (19.8)	75.6 (24.2)	80.5 (26.9)	79.1 (26.2)	72.7 (22.6)	61.3 (16.3)	50.3 (10.2)	40.1 (4.5)	58.4 (14.7)
Daily mean °F (°C)	26.9 (−2.8)	28.8 (−1.8)	36.3 (2.4)	47.5 (8.6)	57.7 (14.3)	66.3 (19.1)	71.7 (22.1)	70.0 (21.1)	63.4 (17.4)	52.1 (11.2)	42.1 (5.6)	32.7 (0.4)	49.6 (9.8)
Mean daily minimum °F (°C)	18.8 (−7.3)	20.4 (−6.4)	27.8 (−2.3)	38.0 (3.3)	47.7 (8.7)	57.0 (13.9)	62.8 (17.1)	60.9 (16.1)	54.1 (12.3)	42.9 (6.1)	34.0 (1.1)	25.3 (−3.7)	40.8 (4.9)
Mean minimum °F (°C)	−0.2 (−17.9)	3.2 (−16.0)	11.1 (−11.6)	26.6 (−3.0)	36.4 (2.4)	44.9 (7.2)	53.3 (11.8)	51.2 (10.7)	40.3 (4.6)	29.7 (−1.3)	20.0 (−6.7)	9.9 (−12.3)	−2.1 (−18.9)
Record low °F (°C)	−19 (−28)	−20 (−29)	−6 (−21)	10 (−12)	25 (−4)	35 (2)	42 (6)	37 (3)	26 (−3)	16 (−9)	1 (−17)	−17 (−27)	−20 (−29)
Average precipitation inches (mm)	3.65 (93)	2.99 (76)	4.38 (111)	4.23 (107)	3.73 (95)	4.52 (115)	4.01 (102)	4.30 (109)	4.48 (114)	4.58 (116)	3.90 (99)	4.50 (114)	49.27 (1,251)
Average snowfall inches (cm)	8.3 (21)	14.1 (36)	6.3 (16)	1.7 (4.3)	0.0 (0.0)	0.0 (0.0)	0.0 (0.0)	0.0 (0.0)	0.0 (0.0)	0.3 (0.76)	1.1 (2.8)	7.2 (18)	39.0 (99)
Average precipitation days (≥ 0.01 in)	10.2	9.0	10.2	11.3	12.7	10.9	10.5	9.5	9.0	10.6	9.1	10.4	123.4
Average snowy days (≥ 0.1 in)	3.8	4.0	2.5	0.6	0.0	0.0	0.0	0.0	0.0	0.1	0.4	2.1	13.5
Source 1: NOAA
Source 2: National Weather Service

== Demographics ==
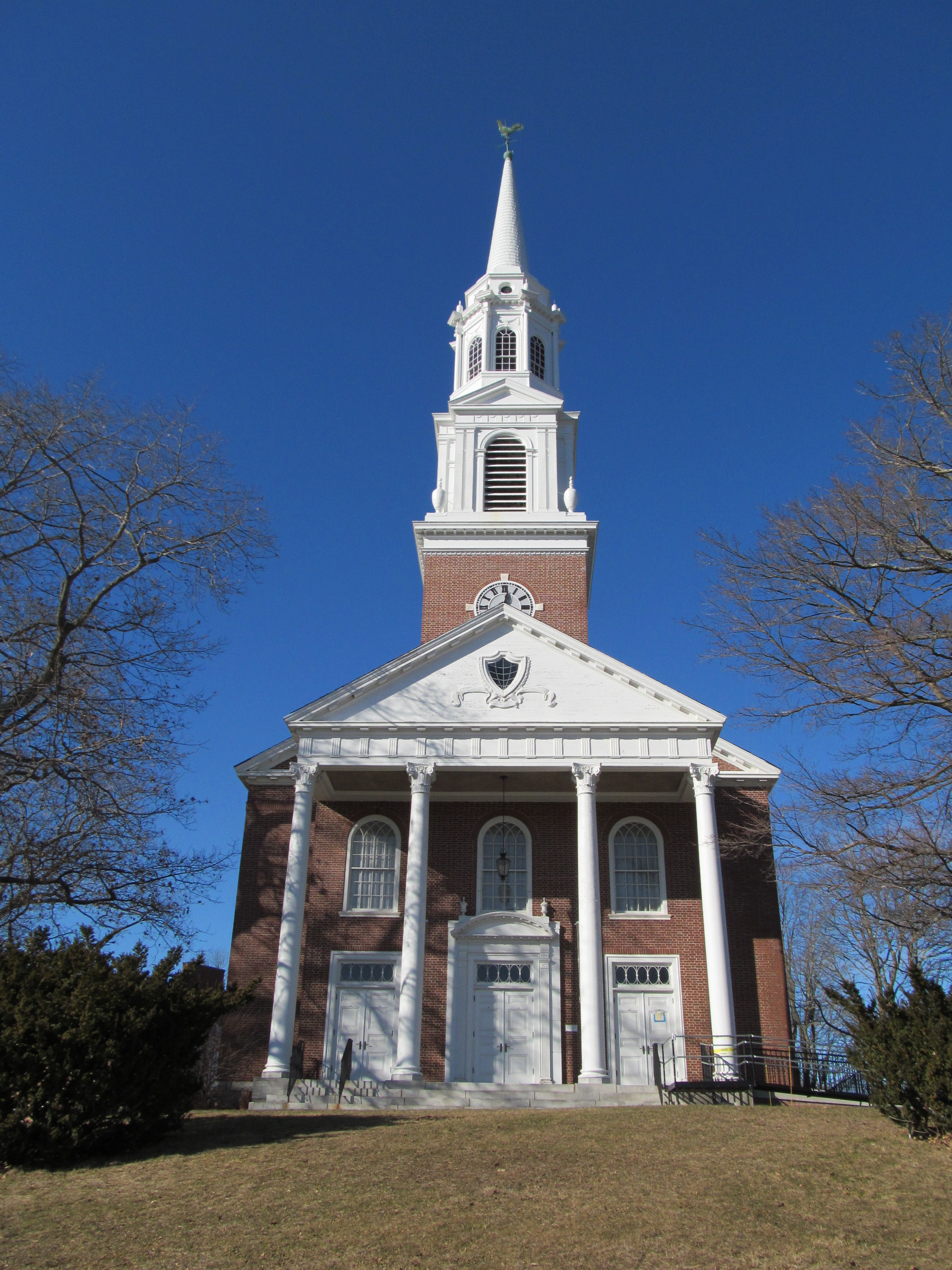
Storrs Congregational Church

=== 2020 census ===
As of the 2020 census, Storrs had a population of 15,979. The median age was 20.6 years. 2.8% of residents were under the age of 18 and 5.3% of residents were 65 years of age or older. For every 100 females there were 91.4 males, and for every 100 females age 18 and over there were 91.2 males age 18 and over.

97.4% of residents lived in urban areas, while 2.6% lived in rural areas.

There were 2,172 households in Storrs, of which 13.8% had children under the age of 18 living in them. Of all households, 19.7% were married-couple households, 31.7% were households with a male householder and no spouse or partner present, and 45.5% were households with a female householder and no spouse or partner present. About 37.4% of all households were made up of individuals and 13.2% had someone living alone who was 65 years of age or older.

There were 2,494 housing units, of which 12.9% were vacant. The homeowner vacancy rate was 4.8% and the rental vacancy rate was 8.1%.

Racial composition as of the 2020 census
Race	Number	Percent
White	11,052	69.2%
Black or African American	1,139	7.1%
American Indian and Alaska Native	41	0.3%
Asian	2,537	15.9%
Native Hawaiian and Other Pacific Islander	8	0.1%
Some other race	533	3.3%
Two or more races	669	4.2%
Hispanic or Latino (of any race)	1,493	9.3%

=== 2000 census ===
As of the 2000 census, there were 10,996 people, 1,630 households, and 645 families residing in the community. The population density was 748.8/km^{2} (1,939.3/mi^{2}). There were 1,701 housing units at an average density of 115.8/km^{2} (300.0/mi^{2}). The racial makeup of the community was 81.10% White, 5.67% African American, 0.09% Native American, 9.13% Asian, 0.05% Pacific Islander, 1.70% from other races, and 2.26% from two or more races. Hispanic or Latino of any race were 4.40% of the population.

There were 1,630 households, out of which 15.3% had children under the age of 18 living with them, 33.6% were married couples living together, 4.1% had a female householder with no husband present, and 60.4% were non-families. 34.1% of all households were made up of individuals, and 16.7% had someone living alone who was 65 years of age or older. The average household size was 2.19 and the average family size was 2.70.

The age distribution, heavily influenced by the University of Connecticut, was 4.0% of the population under the age of 18, 76.1% from 18 to 24, 10.1% from 25 to 44, 3.9% from 45 to 64, and 5.9% who were 65 years of age or older. The median age was 21. For every 100 females, there were 91.7 males. For every 100 females age 18 and over, there were 91.1 males.

The median income for a household in the community was $76,000 and the median income for a family was $64,833. Males had a median income of $34,766 versus $23,229 for females. The per capita income for the CDP was $9,947. About 10.0% of families and 33.5% of the population were below the poverty line, including 5.4% of those under age 18 and 8.2% of those age 65 or over. Standard measures of poverty can be misleading when applied to communities dominated by students, such as Storrs.

== Transportation ==
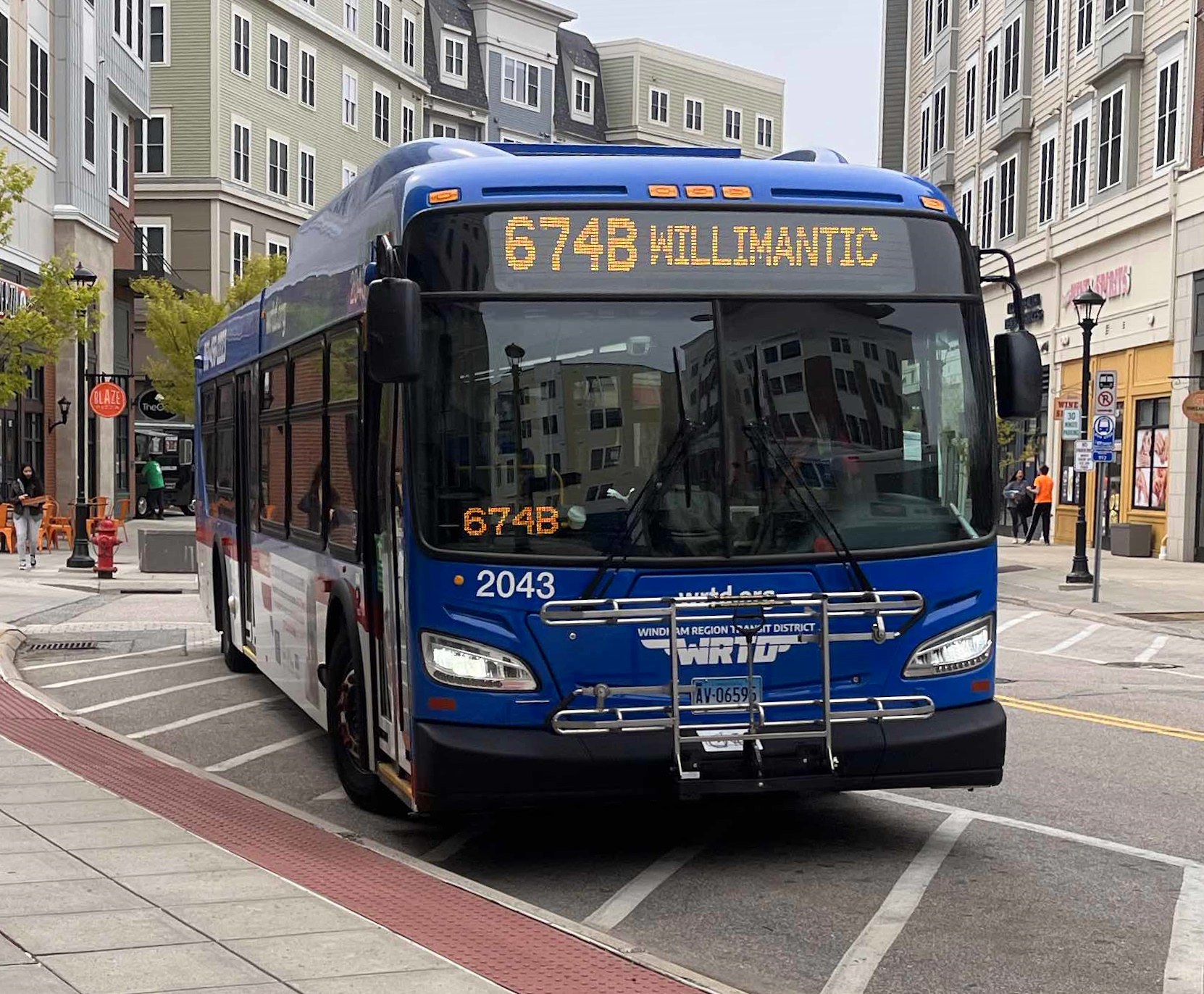
Windham Region Transit District bus

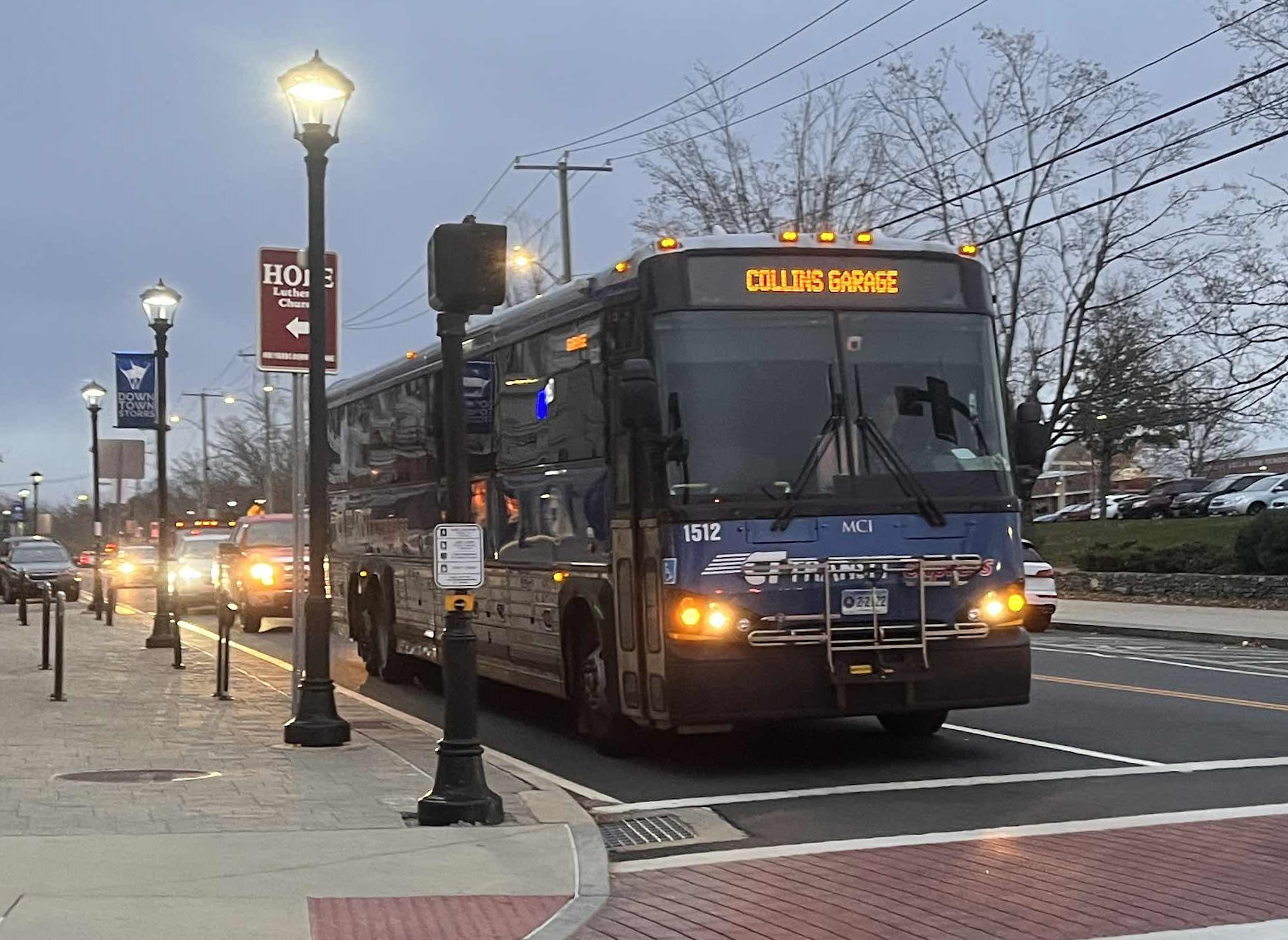
CT Transit Hartford Express bus

The community includes the intersection of state roadways U.S. Route 44 and Connecticut Route 32 in Mansfield Depot. U.S. Route 6, a medium state freeway that runs through Hartford to Providence, Rhode Island, has an interchange with Storrs Road (Connecticut Route 195) on the town border with Willimantic; Storrs Road runs north and intersects with Route 44 at the "four corners", a colloquial name for the intersection, continuing through Coventry and Tolland to meet with Connecticut Route 74.

Willington Hill Road (Connecticut Route 320) and South Eagleville Road (Connecticut Route 275) act as major roadways to access the village from the north and south, respectively. Willington Hill Road begins in nearby Willington and merges into Storrs Road at the "four corners". South Eagleville Road offers a junction to Storrs Road from Route 32 in Coventry.

=== Intermodal services ===
The Nash-Zimmer Transportation Center, located on Royce Circle in the "downtown" area, acts as a de-facto hub for intermodal services, with a parking garage and waiting room.

Local bus service is provided by the Windham Region Transit District (WRTD), with two routes that connect to local points of interest. Route 674 travels toward Willimantic, including stops at the local Big Y supermarket and the East Brook Mall, and route 675 offers stops along Hunting Lodge Road toward Mansfield Depot. WRTD also operates HuskyGo shuttle service in partnership with the UConn transportation services office, which provides access to on-campus locations and stops along Storrs Road (Connecticut Route 195) for students.

Express bus service is provided by CT Transit as route 913, which travels between Storrs and Hartford. The express route makes limited stops at commuter lots in Tolland, Vernon, and Manchester connecting at The Shoppes at Buckland Hills toward Hartford Union Station. A number of runs begin and end at the Sigourney Street CT Fastrak station in Hartford.

Limited intercity bus service is provided by Peter Pan Bus Lines, who run extra routes to Hartford Union Station and to Providence, RI.

=== Former and proposed services ===
Until 1955 inter-city train service was available nine miles to the south at Willimantic station on the New Haven Railroad's Nutmeg line and on trains between Waterbury, Hartford and Boston. From 1991 to 1995, Willimantic was served by Amtrak's Montrealer service. Schedules would refer to the stop as "Willimantic, CT (Storrs) [sic]", owing to the stop's close proximity to the village and use by students.

A plan for expanded passenger rail service in eastern Connecticut through to Vermont, the Central Corridor Rail Line, includes reviving service to Willimantic and the construction of a new Mansfield/Storrs stop. Other proposals for local and high-speed rail projects in Connecticut have included planned stops in Storrs and in nearby Tolland to service UConn.

== Notable people ==
- Regina Barreca, humorist and UConn professor of English literature and feminist theory
- Audrey P. Beck, college professor and Connecticut state legislator
- Rivers Cuomo, lead singer/guitarist of the alternative rock band Weezer, grew up in Storrs and attended the local secondary school, E.O. Smith High School
- Cheo Hodari Coker, television writer and producer for Luke Cage, Ray Donovan, and Southland
- Wally Lamb, best-selling author of the books She's Come Undone and I Know This Much Is True. Both were selected for Oprah's Book Club.
- Dan Orlovsky, ESPN college football and NFL analyst, former quarterback for the Detroit Lions
- Tim Page, Pulitzer Prize-winning music critic and biographer of Dawn Powell
- Jonathan Pelto, American politician
- Samuel Pickering, professor at the University of Connecticut, inspiration for the character Mr. Keating in the film Dead Poets Society
- Dom Sigillo, retired American football player, played for the Chicago Bears and Detroit Lions.
- Charles and Augustus Storrs, brothers, business partners, benefactors and co-founders of the University of Connecticut
- Peter Tork (ne Peter Halsten Thorkelson), member of The Monkees. He attended E.O. Smith High School; he was class of 1959 and made the class of 2005 commencement speech.
- Wendy O. Williams, lead singer for the 1970s and 1980s punk rock band the Plasmatics, lived in town from 1991 until her death in 1998

== See also ==
- WHUS FM 91.7
