= South Windsor, Connecticut =

- Town
- Town of South Windsor
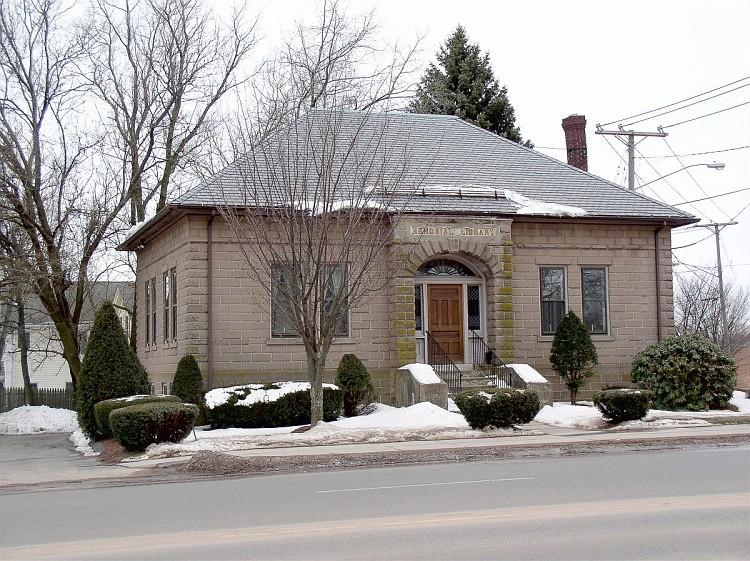
- Former Sadd Memorial Library

- Seal

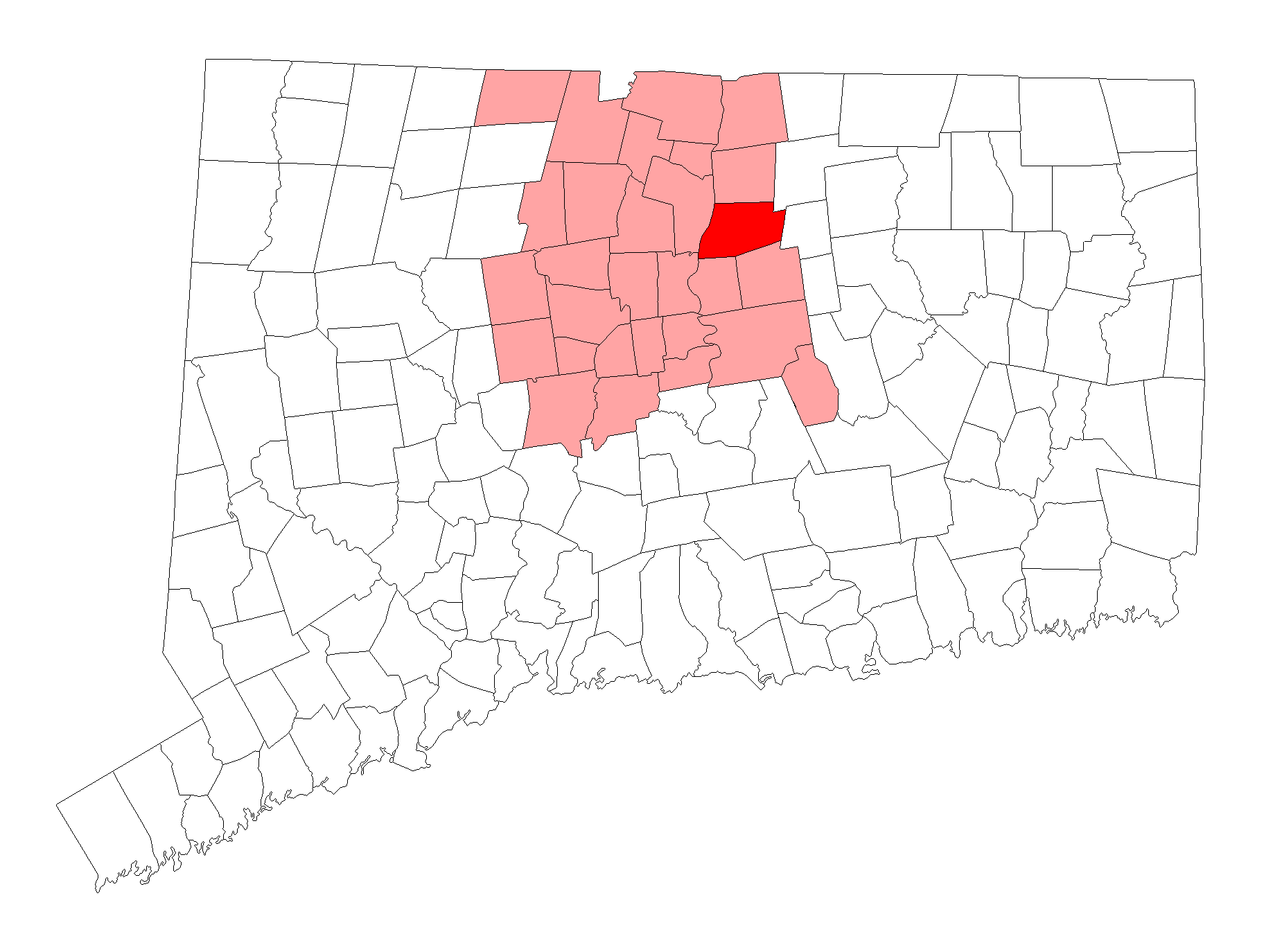
- Coordinates: 41°49′56″N 72°34′11″W
- Country: United States
- U.S. state: Connecticut
- County: Hartford
- Region: Capitol Region
- Settled: 1652
- Incorporated: September 3, 1845

Government
  - Type: Council-manager
  - South Windsor Town Council: Craig Zimmerman (D), Mayor; Andy Paterna (D), Deputy Mayor; Elizabeth Pendleton (D); Steven King Jr. (D); Maura Fitzgerald (D); Audrey Delnicki (R); Michael Ouellette (R); Steve Cordeiro (R); Richard M. Balboni Jr. (R)
  - Town manager: Michael Maniscalco

Area
  - Total: 28.7 sq mi (74.3 km^{2})
  - Land: 28.1 sq mi (72.7 km^{2})
  - Water: 0.62 sq mi (1.6 km^{2})
- Elevation: 72 ft (22 m)

Population (2020)
  - Total: 26,918
  - Density: 959/sq mi (370/km^{2})
- Time zone: UTC-5 (EST)
  - Summer (DST): UTC-4 (EDT)
- ZIP Code: 06074
- Area codes: 860/959
- FIPS code: 09-71390
- GNIS feature ID: 0213509
- Website: www.southwindsor-ct.gov

South Windsor is a town in Hartford County, Connecticut, United States. The town is part of the Capitol Planning Region. The population was 26,918 at the 2020 census. It is home to two historic districts. Now South Windsor's population is 27,036 as of 2025.

== History ==
In 1659, Thomas Burnham (1617–1688) purchased the tract of land now covered by the towns of South Windsor and East Hartford from Tantinomo, chief sachem of the Podunk Indians. Burnham lived on the land and later willed it to his nine children. Beginning in the middle of the 17th century, a few settlers from Windsor began using land on the east bank of the Connecticut River for grazing and farming purposes. By 1700, a number of families had made their homes in the area. In 1768, the residents of the area were allowed to incorporate as the separate town of East Windsor, though the area was informally referred to as East Windsor before this time. At the time, the town included all of what is now the present-day towns of East Windsor, South Windsor, and Ellington. Known for its agriculture and ship building, the town of East Windsor, including South Windsor, supplied more than 200 volunteers during the American Revolution. In 1786, Ellington became an independent town, and South Windsor was incorporated as a separate town in 1845. Tobacco has been a major crop grown in South Windsor since its founding.

(Old) Main Street, located near the Connecticut River and running north to south from the border of East Windsor to that of East Hartford, is the center of the town's historic district. The Wood Memorial Library & Museum and Ellsworth School are located on the street. Minister Timothy Edwards, the namesake of the town's middle school, is buried in a cemetery located on this street. In 1698, Edwards became the first minister for the settlers on the east side of the river, and his church was built on Main Street (in present-day South Windsor). His son, theologian Jonathan Edwards, was born in South Windsor (at the time still part of Windsor). Ulysses S. Grant stayed at a home on the street.

The town has become less and less agricultural and rural since 1950. This former farming community has been transformed into a suburban town with industrial and commercial districts. The town's population more than tripled between 1950 and 2000. In the early 1990s, residents mobilized a successful campaign against a proposed nuclear waste dump located near the East Windsor town line.

== On the National Register of Historic Places ==
- East Windsor Hill Historic District – Roughly bounded by the Scantic River, John Fitch Boulevard, Sullivan Avenue, and the Connecticut River, added in 1986
- Elmore Houses – 78 and 87 Long Hill Road, added in 1985
- Windsor Farms Historic District – Roughly bounded by Strong Road, U.S. Route 5, Interstate 291, and the Connecticut River, added in 1986

== Geography ==
According to the United States Census Bureau, the town has a total area of 28.7 square miles (74.3 km^{2}), of which 28.1 square miles (72.7 km^{2}) is land and 0.62 square miles (1.6 km^{2}), or 2.12%, is water.

Climate data for South Windsor, Connecticut
Month	Jan	Feb	Mar	Apr	May	Jun	Jul	Aug	Sep	Oct	Nov	Dec	Year
Record high °F (°C)	70 (21)	74 (23)	86 (30)	93 (34)	99 (37)	100 (38)	101 (38)	102 (39)	101 (38)	89 (32)	83 (28)	75 (24)	102 (39)
Mean daily maximum °F (°C)	36 (2)	39 (4)	48 (9)	60 (16)	70 (21)	79 (26)	84 (29)	82 (28)	75 (24)	63 (17)	52 (11)	41 (5)	61 (16)
Mean daily minimum °F (°C)	18 (−8)	22 (−6)	29 (−2)	40 (4)	49 (9)	59 (15)	65 (18)	63 (17)	54 (12)	42 (6)	35 (2)	24 (−4)	42 (5)
Record low °F (°C)	−17 (−27)	−24 (−31)	−4 (−20)	11 (−12)	25 (−4)	39 (4)	45 (7)	38 (3)	29 (−2)	18 (−8)	5 (−15)	−12 (−24)	−24 (−31)
Average precipitation inches (mm)	3.15 (80)	2.75 (70)	3.57 (91)	3.88 (99)	3.89 (99)	3.99 (101)	4.00 (102)	3.66 (93)	3.48 (88)	4.14 (105)	3.84 (98)	3.35 (85)	43.70 (1,110)
Source: Weather Channel

== Demographics ==
Historical population
Census	Pop.	Note	%±
1850	1,638		—
1860	1,789		9.2%
1870	1,688		−5.6%
1880	1,902		12.7%
1890	1,736		−8.7%
1900	2,014		16.0%
1910	2,251		11.8%
1920	2,142		−4.8%
1930	2,535		18.3%
1940	2,863		12.9%
1950	4,066		42.0%
1960	9,460		132.7%
1970	15,553		64.4%
1980	17,198		10.6%
1990	22,090		28.4%
2000	24,412		10.5%
2010	25,709		5.3%
2020	26,918		4.7%
DECD

As of the census of 2020, there were 26,918 people and 9,926 families residing in the town. The population density was 944.5 inhabitants per square mile (364.7/km^{2}). There were 10,804 housing units at an average density of 379.1 per square mile (146.4/km^{2}).

The racial makeup of the town was 68.7% White, 18.4% Asian, 5.9% Hispanic or Latino (of any race), 4.4% Black or African American, 0.2% Native American, 0.05% Pacific Islander, 1.9% from other races, and 6.4% from two or more races.

There were 9,926 households, out of which 20.8% had children under the age of 18 living with them, 65.9% were married couples living together, 19.0% had a female householder with no spouse present, and 11.2% had a male householder with no spouse present.

In the town, the population included 25.7% age birth to 19; 5.4% from age 20 to 24; 24.1% from age 25 to 44; 29.0% from age 45 to 64; and 15.9% who were 65 years of age or older. The median age was 41.4 years.

The median household income in the town was $126,996, and the median income for a married-couple family was $153,438. About 4.9% of people were below the poverty line, including 7.0% of those under the age of 18 and 3.4% of those age 65 or over.

Among residents age 25 or over, 55.0% held a bachelor's degree or higher, and 97.0% held a high school or equivalent degree.

== Economy ==
=== Top employers ===
Top employers in South Windsor according to the town's 2024 Comprehensive Annual Financial Report

#	Employer	# of Employees
1	Town of South Windsor	926
2	Broadbridge	550
3	New England Mechanical	368
4	Target Corporation	250
5	The May Company	221
6	Electro Methods	208
7	Doosan Fuel Cell America	193
8	Lowe's	160
9	Stop & Shop	145
10	TicketNetwork	141

== Education ==
Children attending the public school systems in South Windsor begin at the elementary school level (Kindergarten through Grade 5) at one of four elementary schools: Pleasant Valley, Orchard Hill, Philip R. Smith, and Eli Terry. Wapping Elementary School was transferred to the Parks and Recreation department for several years before being turned over to the high school in 2023 for additional classroom space due to growing school enrollment. After graduating from elementary school, students then move on to Timothy Edwards Middle School, for grades 6–8. They also have the choice to go to a magnet school, Two Rivers Magnet Middle School in East Hartford. They then finish up their schooling at South Windsor High School. Over 140 students in the 2004, 2005, and 2006 classes have been admitted to the University of Connecticut in Storrs.

== Government and politics ==
South Windsor Town Council

Type
- Type: Town council

Leadership
- Mayor: Craig Zimmerman, Democrat
- Deputy Mayor: Andy Paterna, Democrat
- Town manager: Mike Maniscalco

Structure
- Seats: 9
- Political groups: Democratic Party (5); Republican Party (4)

Elections
- Last election: November 4, 2025

Meeting place
- Council Chambers, 1540 Sullivan Ave.

Website
- Official website

=== Town council ===
South Windsor is governed by a council-manager form of government. The town manager is appointed by the town council and the leader of the council is designated as the mayor, with a deputy mayor also chosen from amongst the council.

The town council holds its elections every two years, on odd-numbered years. Effective in 2025, each party nominates only up to five candidates for the nine town council positions (which are all at-large), and each voter may only vote for up to five candidates from the pool of all candidates nominated by all parties. The top nine vote-getters win seats on the town council; as a result the council always has a 5–4 majority (assuming only two parties are participating), ensuring representation of the minority party.

=== Voting ===
Voter Registration and Party Enrollment as of October 19, 2026
Party	Active Voters	Inactive Voters	Total Voters	Percentage
Democratic	5,856	580	6,436	34.38%
Republican	3,467	284	3,751	20.04%
Unaffiliated	7,352	952	8,304	44.36%
Minor parties	197	30	227	1.21%
Total	16,872	1,846	18,718	100%

Election results from statewide races
Year	Office	Results	
2026	Governor	Ned Lamont	Ryan Fazio
2026	Congress	Luke Bronin	Amy Chai
2024	President	Kamala Harris 58.4%	Donald Trump 39.0%
2024	Senator	Chris Murphy 60.6%	Matthew Corey 37.7%
2024	Congress	John Larson 62.8%	Jim Griffin 35.1%
2022	Governor	Ned Lamont 59.3%	Bob Stefanowski 39.5%
2022	Senator	Richard Blumenthal 61.0%	Leora Levy 39.0%
2022	Congress	John Larson 61.6%	Larry Lazor 37.2%
2020	President	Joe Biden 61.1%	Donald Trump 36.3%
2020	Congress	John Larson 64.5%	Mary Fay 34.2%
2018	Governor	Ned Lamont 47.5%	Bob Stefanowski 44.6%
2018	Senator	Chris Murphy 60.1%	Matthew Corey 38.7%
2018	Congress	John Larson 63.4%	Jennifer Nye 35.7%
2016	President	Hillary Clinton 55.3%	Donald Trump 39.8%
2016	Senator	Richard Blumenthal 69.1%	Dan Carter 28.9%
2016	Congress	John Larson 62.4%	Matthew Corey 36.1%
2014	Governor	Thomas Foley 49.8%	Dan Malloy 48.9%
2014	Congress	John Larson 62.1%	Matthew Corey 36.7%
2012	President	Barack Obama 56.4%	Mitt Romney 42.3%
2012	Senator	Chris Murphy 54.0%	Linda McMahon 43.9%
2012	Congress	John Larson 68.3%	John Henry Decker 29.1%
2010	Governor	Thomas Foley 50.7%	Dan Malloy 48.0%
2010	Senator	Richard Blumenthal 55.5%	Linda McMahon 42.9%
2010	Congress	John Larson 60.0%	Ann Brickley 38.8%
2008	President	Barack Obama 61.0%	John McCain 37.7%
2008	Congress	John Larson 72.7%	Joe Visconti 25.8%
2006	Governor	Jodi Rell 63.7%	John DeStefano Jr. 35.4%
2006	Senator	Joseph Lieberman 48.4%	Ned Lamont 41.8%
2006	Congress	John Larson 76.1%	Scott MacLean 23.9%
2004	President	John Kerry 54.5%	George W. Bush 44.0%
2004	Senator	Chris Dodd 69.6%	Jack Orchulli 29.0%
2004	Congress	John Larson 74.4%	John Halstead 25.6%
2002	Governor	John G. Rowland 60.2%	Bill Curry 39.8%
2002	Congress	John Larson 68.7%	Phil Steele 31.3%
2000	President	Al Gore 56.1%	George W. Bush 39.2%
2000	Senator	Joseph Lieberman 61.5%	Phil Giordano 36.6%
2000	Congress	John Larson 72.4%	Bob Backlund 27.6%

== Notable people ==
- Israel Bissell (1752–1823), post rider, rode from Lexington to Philadelphia to warn about the British
- Nancy Caffyn (1934–2010), mayor and state legislator
- Marcus Camby (born 1974), National Basketball Association player
- Chris Clark (born 1976), former National Hockey League player
- Michael Donnelly (1959–2005), Gulf War veteran and activist
- Jonathan Edwards (1703–1758), theologian
- Timothy Edwards (1669–1758), clergyman, namesake of Timothy Edwards Middle School
- John Fitch (1743–1798), inventor
- Will Friedle (born 1976), actor, voice actor and comedian
- Alex Grossi (born 1976), guitarist for the rock band Quiet Riot
- Jack Hathaway (born 1982), astronaut, one of the 10 candidates selected as part of NASA Astronaut Group 23
- Romil Hemnani (born 1995), musician, member of hip hop group Brockhampton
- Deborah Dillon Lightfoot (1956–2007), wheelchair athlete; National Wheelchair Basketball Hall of Fame
- Fraser Metzger (1872–1954), clergyman, politician, college administrator
- Brent Morin (born 1986), actor/comedian (Undateable)
- Paul Pasqualoni (born 1949), former head coach of the University of Connecticut football team
- Jeff Porcaro (1954–1992), member of rock band Toto
- Mike Porcaro (1955–2015), member of rock band Toto
- Steve Porcaro (born 1957), member of rock band Toto
- Abner Reed, engraver and writer who lived at 932 Main Street
- Brian Sullivan, ice hockey player
- Eli Terry (1772–1852), clockmaker, inventor
- Oliver Wolcott (1726–1797), signer of the Declaration of Independence
- Houman Younessi (1963–2016), scientist
