= South Windsor High School =

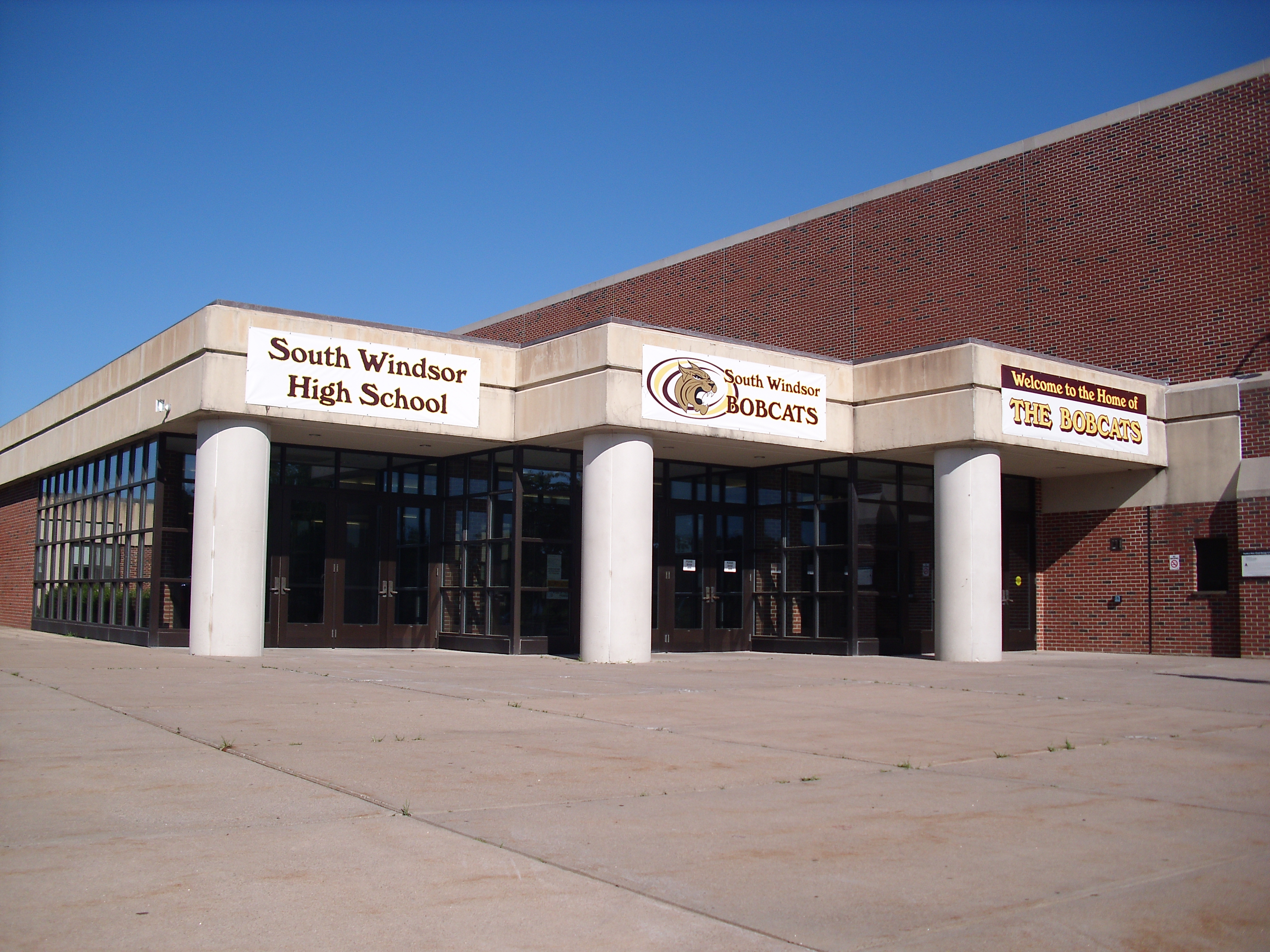

Location
- 161 Nevers Road; South Windsor, Connecticut 06074; United States; 41°50′32″N 72°33′16″W

Information
- Type: Public
- School district: South Windsor Public Schools
- Superintendent: Kate Carter
- CEEB code: 070700
- Principal: Joseph LeRoy
- Teaching staff: 126.25 (FTE)
- Grades: 9-12
- Enrollment: 1,442 (2024–2025)
- Student to teacher ratio: 11.42
- Colors: Maroon and gold
- Team name: Bobcats
- Website: highschool.southwindsorschools.org

South Windsor High School is located in South Windsor, Connecticut. It currently serves grades 9-12 with approximately 1,364 students and a 13:1 student-teacher ratio. It is the only high school in South Windsor, but also admits students from Hartford through the Open Choice Program. It has grown by 23% since 2016, adding roughly 1,000 students to its ranks.

== History ==
The preceding school was Ellsworth Memorial High School, which served as South Windsor's public high school from 1935 until 1961. Its building address was 1737 Main Street in South Windsor. The school bore the name of Erastus Ellsworth, and accepted students from both South and East Windsor. The building was orginally erected for the Theological Institute of Connecticut, a seminary founded in 1834.

In 2015, South Windsor High School suspended and eventually forced a tenured and decorated teacher to resign. He had read Allen Ginsberg's homoerotic poem "Please Master" during an Advanced Placement English Class.

== Noteworthy events ==
South Windsor High School was the state's first municipal facility to be powered and heated by a fuel cell, made possible by a funding program through the Connecticut Clean Energy Fund. The PureCell 200 kW fuel cell was manufactured and installed by South Windsor-based UTC Power, a division of United Technologies Corporation in 2002.

South Windsor High School served as a community shelter for nine consecutive days and nights in the aftermath of Winter Storm Alfred in 2011. When grid power failed, emergency response mechanisms kicked in, with fuel cell systems supplying critical electrical power, as well as heat and hot water. Town Manager Matt Galligan said 200 people from South Windsor and neighboring towns were sleeping in the high school each night. More than 600 people were served three hot meals a day, prepared by kitchen staff. The nurses' station was operational; there were hot showers and charging stations for electronics.

== Rankings ==
Newsweek ranked South Windsor High School as 348/500 on their list of the top 500 high schools in the United States in 2016.

== Athletics ==
South Windsor high school is part of the CCC, the Central Connecticut Conference competing in the East division. Athletic accomplishments include the CIAC Division II ice hockey championships in 1976 and 1997.

Wins in CIAC State Championships
Sport	Class	Year(s)
Baseball	L	1993
Baseball	LL	2025
Basketball (boys)	M	1970
Basketball (boys)	L	1971
Cross country (boys)	L	1995
Cross country (girls)	L	1995
Cross country (girls)	LL	1984 (Co-champions with Norwich Free Academy)
Field hockey	L	1993
Ice Hockey (boys)	II	1976, 1997
Lacrosse (boys)	II	1999
Soccer (boys)	L	1979
Softball	L	1978
Track and field (indoor, boys)	M	1991
Track and field (outdoor, boys)	M	1972
Volleyball (boys)	M	2016

== Bobcat Robotics ==
In 2007, Bobcat Robotics, the South Windsor High School FIRST Robotics Competition team, won the international FIRST Championship event in Atlanta, partnered with teams from Worcester, Massachusetts and Las Vegas, Nevada.

== Notable alumni ==
- Christopher T. Calio, CEO of RTX Corporation
- Chris Clark, National Hockey League player
- Lewis Craparotta, U.S. Marine Corps major general
- Tom Delnicki, Connecticut state representative
- Deborah Dillon Lightfoot, wheelchair basketball player and Paralympian
- Jon DiSalvatore, National Hockey League player
- Jack Hathaway, NASA astronaut
- Romil Hemnani, member of the musical group Brockhampton
- Brent Morin, actor and comedian
- Billy Morrissette, actor, writer and director
