= Sherman House =

Sherman House or Sherman Farm may refer to:

- David Sherman House, Woodbury, Connecticut, listed on the National Register of Historic Places (NRHP)
- Lampson P. Sherman House, Des Moines, Iowa, NRHP-listed
- Hoyt Sherman Place, Des Moines, Iowa, NRHP-listed
- Sherman House Hotel, Chicago, Illinois, closed in 1973, demolished in 1980 after which the James R. Thompson Center was constructed in its place
- The Sherman (Batesville, Indiana), hotel and restaurant formerly known as "Sherman House"
- William B. Sherman Farm, North Adams, Massachusetts, NRHP-listed
- Eber Sherman Farm, North Adams, Massachusetts, NRHP-listed
- Byron R. Sherman House, White Sulphur Springs, Montana, NRHP-listed
- The Sherman (Omaha, Nebraska), NRHP-listed
- Sherman House (Glens Falls, New York), NRHP-listed
- Sherman Farm (Pittstown, New York), NRHP-listed
- Elijah Sherman Farm, Berea, North Carolina, NRHP-listed
- Red Oak-Sherman, William C., House, Dayton, Ohio, listed on the NRHP in Ohio
- John Sherman Birthplace, Lancaster, Ohio, listed on the NRHP in Ohio
- John Sherman Memorial Gateway, Mansfield, Ohio, listed on the NRHP in Ohio
- Eleanor Sherman House, Monmouth, Oregon, listed on the NRHP in Oregon
- Jones–Sherman House, Salem, Oregon, listed on the NRHP in Oregon
- L. G. Sherman Tobacco Warehouse, Lancaster, Pennsylvania, NRHP-listed
- William Watts Sherman House, Newport, Rhode Island, listed on the NRHP in Rhode Island
- Welch-Sherman House, Park City, Utah, listed on the NRHP in Utah
- Hosford-Sherman Farm, Poultney, Vermont, NRHP-listed
- Sherman House (Alma, Wisconsin), NRHP-listed

== See also ==
- The Sherman (disambiguation)
- Sherman Historic District (disambiguation)
