= David Sherman =

David Sherman may refer to:

- David Sherman (novelist) (1944–2022)
- David Sherman (philosopher) (born 1958)
- David Sherman (psychologist)
- David Sherman (rabbi) (1909–2002)
- David Sherman, founder of the beverage company that is now called Luxco

== See also ==
- David Sherman House, historic house in Woodbury, Connecticut
