= The Sherman =

The Sherman may refer to:

- The Sherman, a ship and restaurant, formerly the Army ferry USAT General Frank M. Coxe, in San Francisco, California
- The Sherman (Batesville, Indiana), a hotel on the National Registry of the Historic Hotels of America
- The Sherman (Omaha, Nebraska), a historic building in Omaha, Nebraska

== See also ==
- Sherman House (disambiguation)
- Sherman Historic District (disambiguation)
