= Candlewood Corner, Connecticut =

Candlewood Corner
- Location within Connecticut Location within the United States
- Coordinates: 41°28′07.7″N 73°28′22.5″W
- Country: United States
- State: Connecticut
- County: Fairfield
- Town: New Fairfield
- ZIP Code: 06812 (New Fairfield)
- Area codes: 203/475

Candlewood Corner is a small enclave of restaurants and businesses on Route 39 in the town of New Fairfield, Fairfield County, Connecticut, United States. It is in the southeast part of the town and serves as the gateway to New Fairfield's Candlewood Lake communities. The Town Tribune, a local newspaper serving New Fairfield and Sherman is located here.

== History ==
Prior to the construction of Candlewood Lake, this section was known as "Millers Corner" and then later "Hatch’s Corner," before ultimately taking on the name "Candlewood Corner". It is home to the historic Cosier-Murphy House, which is listed on the National Register of Historic Places.

== Gallery ==
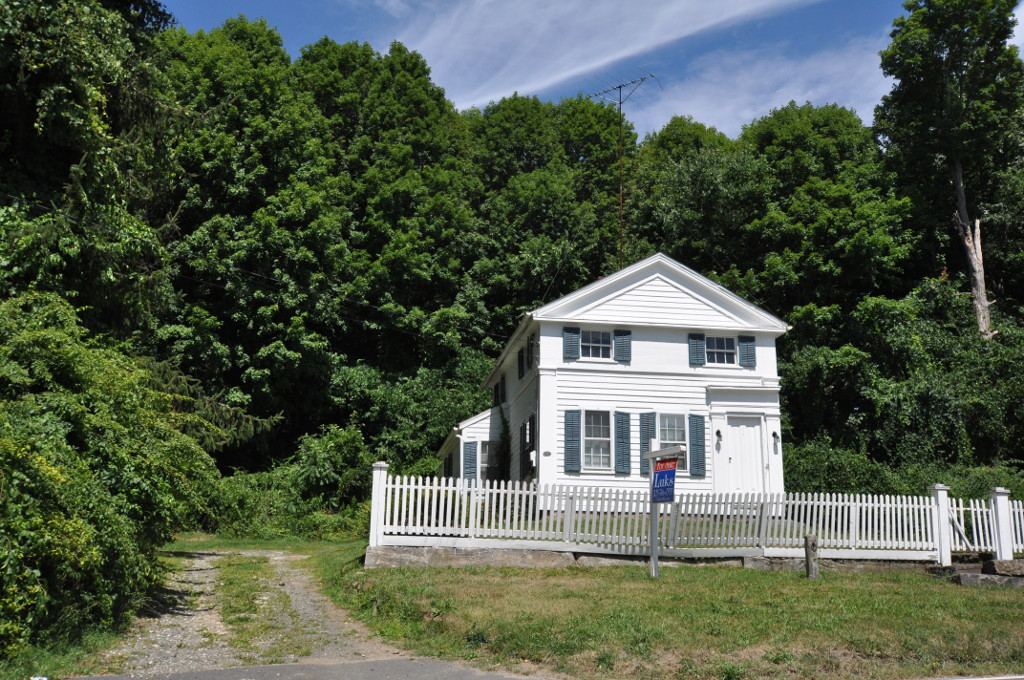
Cosier-Murphy House

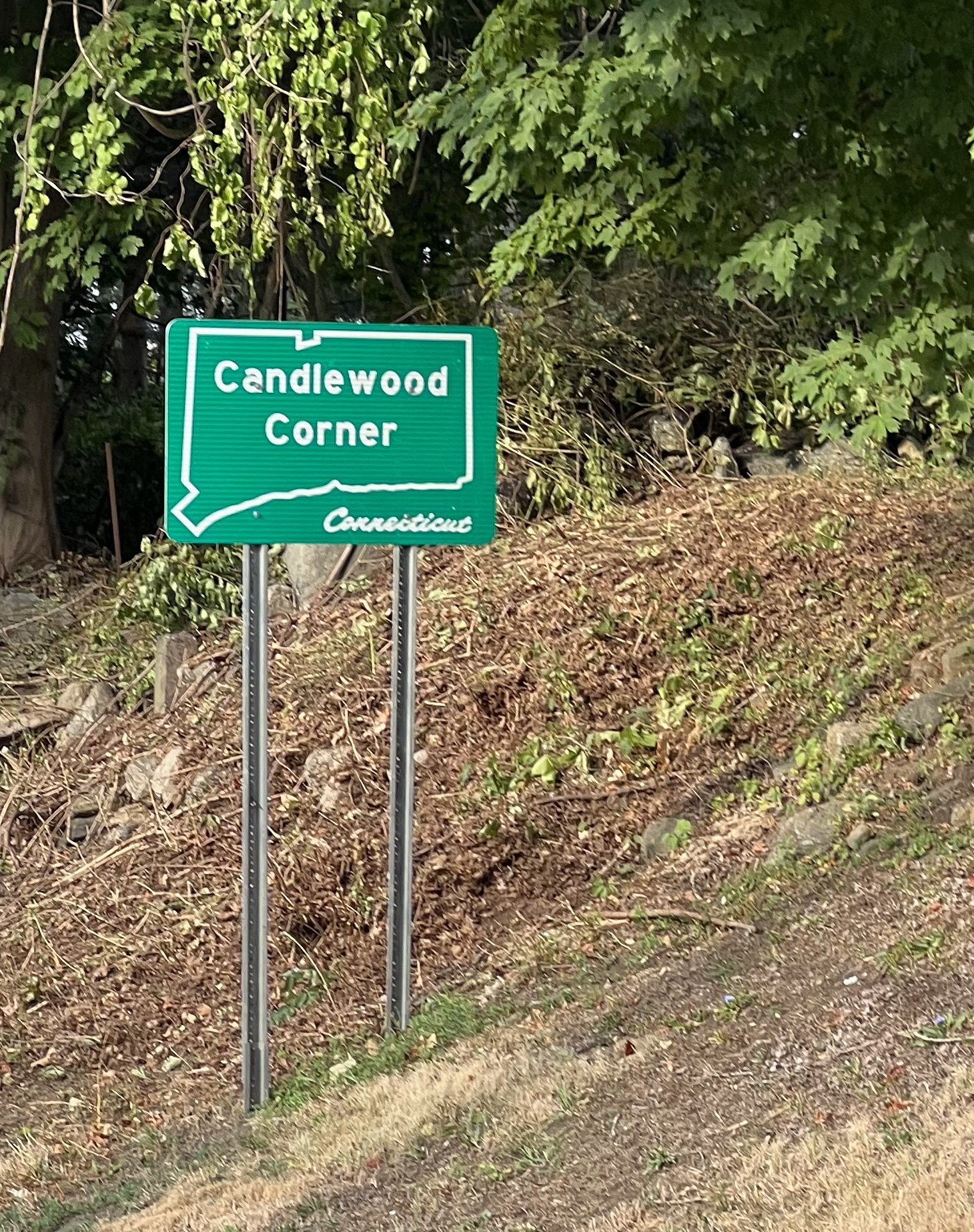
Candlewood Corner road sign

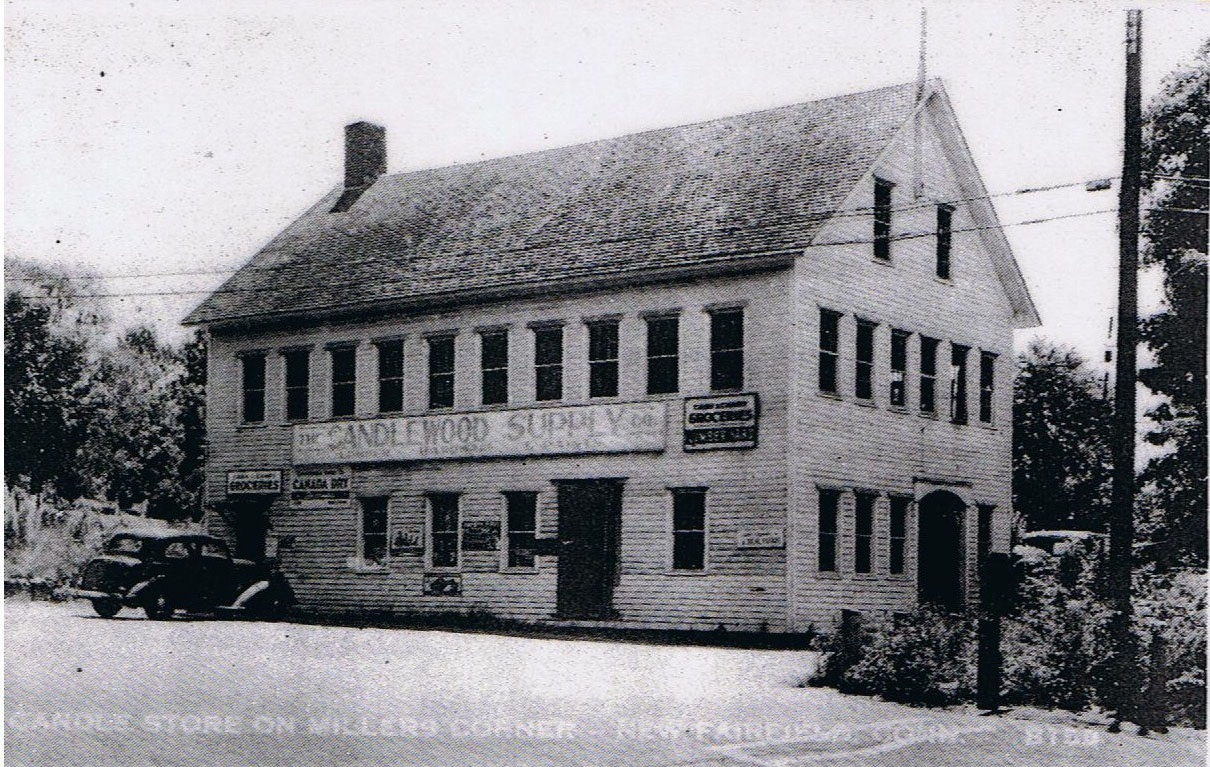
Candlewood Supply Co., now Icons Sports Bar
