= Connecticut Route 55 =

State highway in western Connecticut, US

Route 55
- Map of western Connecticut with Route 55 highlighted in red

Route information
- Maintained by CTDOT
- Length: 2.64 mi (4.25 km)
- Existed: 1932–present

Major junctions
- West end: NY 55 at the New York state line near Gaylordsville
- Route 39 in Gaylordsville
- East end: US 7 in Gaylordsville

Location
- Country: United States
- State: Connecticut
- Counties: Fairfield, Litchfield

Highway system
- Connecticut State Highway System; Interstate; US; State; SSR; SR; Scenic
← Route 53	→ Route 57

Route 55 is a state highway in the western part of the U.S. state of Connecticut, running from the New York state line in Sherman to New Milford. It functions as an extension of New York State Route 55 (NY 55) to U.S. Route 7 (US 7).

== Route description ==
Route 55 begins at the New York state line in rural northern Sherman, connecting with New York State Route 55 in the hamlet of Webatuck (ultimately leading to New York State Route 22). It travels eastward for 1.6 miles (2.6 km) then intersects with the northern end of Route 39, which leads to the town center of Sherman. Route 55 continues east for another 0.2 miles (0.32 km), entering New Milford for about 0.1-mile (0.16 km), then briefly crossing back into Sherman for another 0.1-mile (0.16 km), before returning to New Milford. Route 55 becomes Webatuck Road in New Milford, running for another 0.6 miles (0.97 km) until it ends in the Gaylordsville section of New Milford at an intersection with U.S. Route 7 near the Housatonic River. Within the town of Sherman, Route 55 has no street name and is known simply as "Route 55". Route 55 is a rural collector road and carries average daily traffic volumes of 3,100 between Route 39 and US 7.

== History ==
In the 1920s, the road between the New York state line (towards the hamlet of Webatuck) and the Gaylordsville section of New Milford was designated as a state highway known as Highway 129. The old state highway was renumbered to modern Route 55 as part of the 1932 state highway renumbering. The number 55 was chosen to match New York State Route 55 across the state line, which was also extended north from its original eastern terminus in Pawling to Wingdale (via an overlap with New York State Route 22) and then east through Webatuck to the Connecticut state line.

== Major intersections ==
County	Location	mi	km	Destinations	Notes
Fairfield	Sherman	0.00	0.00	NY 55 west	Continuation into New York
Fairfield	Sherman	1.59	2.56	Route 39 south – Sherman, Squantz Pond State Park	Northern terminus of Route 39
Litchfield	New Milford	2.64	4.25	US 7 – Kent, New Milford, Danbury	Eastern terminus
1.000 mi = 1.609 km; 1.000 km = 0.621 mi
