= Sherman School =

Sherman School may refer to:

- Sherman Elementary School—East Omaha, Nebraska
- Little Rock Central High School (formerly Sherman School (1869–1885))—Little Rock, Arkansas
- Sherman School (Connecticut)—Sherman, Connecticut
