= Cosier-Murphy House =

Historic house in Connecticut, United States

- U.S. National Register of Historic Places
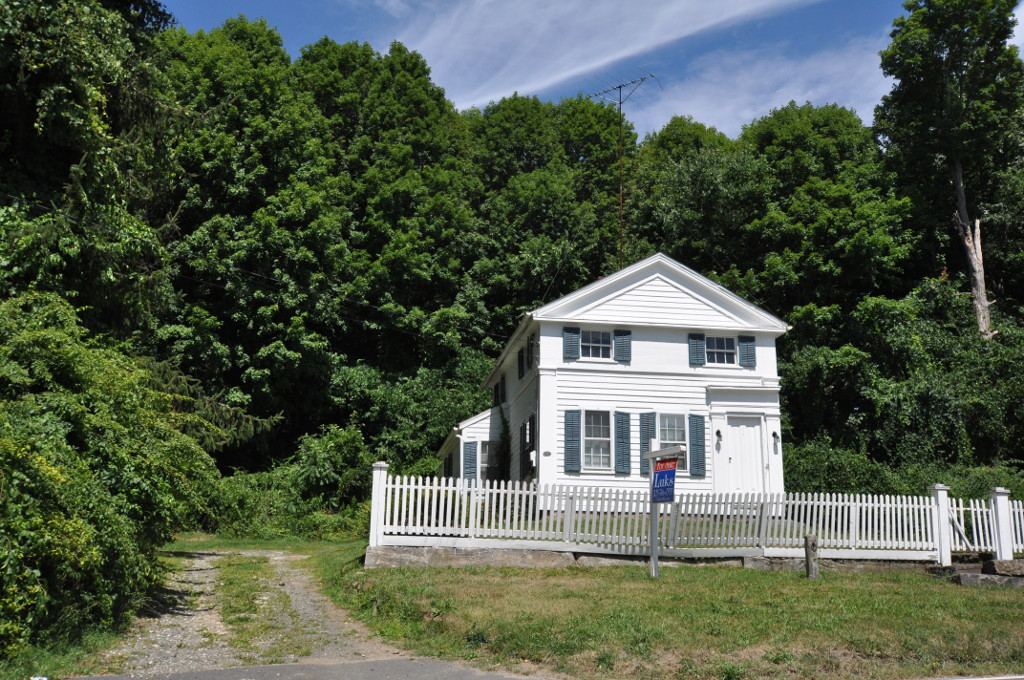

- Location within Connecticut Location within the United States
- Location: 67 CT 39, New Fairfield, Connecticut
- Coordinates: 41°28′11″N 73°28′27″W
- Area: 1.8 acres (0.73 ha)
- Built: 1840
- Architectural style: Greek Revival
- NRHP reference No.: 91000994
- Added to NRHP: July 31, 1991

The Cosier-Murphy House is a historic house at 67 Connecticut Route 39 in the Candlewood Corner section of New Fairfield, Connecticut. Built about 1840, it is one of the town's best-preserved 19th-century houses, and a good local example Greek Revival architecture. The house, along with a small agricultural outbuilding, was listed on the National Register of Historic Places in 1991.

== Description and history ==
The Cosier-Murphy House stands in a rural residential setting northeast of New Fairfield's town center, on the north side of CT 39 a short way west of Saw Mill Road. It is a two-story wood-frame structure, three bays wide, with a front-gable roof and shed-roof additions to the side and rear. It has a side-hall plan, with the main entrance in the right-hand bay, and shortened windows on the second floor, in what appears to be an expanded frieze band above corner pilasters. The entry is framed by pilasters which rise to support a corniced entablature. The interior has well-preserved period woodwork, including the fireplace mantel in the front parlor. Interior doors are original, with original latches or doorknobs.

The house was built about 1840, based on architectural evidence; the town's records were destroyed by fire in 1867. It was purchased from Cosier's widow by Daniel Murphy, an Irish immigrant who lived next door (in a house that has not survived). It remained in the hands of Murphy's descendants until 1970. They claim that New Fairfield's first Roman Catholic mass was held in this house about 1880 by an iterant priest.

== See also ==
- National Register of Historic Places listings in Fairfield County, Connecticut
