= Lakeside Woods, Connecticut =

Census-designated place in Connecticut, United States

- Census-designated place
- Location within Connecticut Location within the United States
- Coordinates: 41°33′21″N 73°29′6″W
- Country: United States
- State: Connecticut
- County: Fairfield
- Town: Sherman

Area
  - Total: 0.58 sq mi (1.51 km^{2})
  - Land: 0.58 sq mi (1.51 km^{2})
  - Water: 0 sq mi (0.0 km^{2})
- Elevation: 660 ft (200 m)

Population (2020)
  - Total: 309
- Time zone: UTC-5 (Eastern (EST))
  - Summer (DST): UTC-4 (EDT)
- ZIP Code: 06784 (Sherman)
- Area codes: 860/959
- FIPS code: 09-41714
- GNIS feature ID: 2805953

Lakeside Woods is a census-designated place (CDP) in the town of Sherman, Fairfield County, Connecticut, United States. It is in the southern part of the town, on the western shore of Candlewood Lake and is bordered to the north by the main village of Sherman. As of the 2020 census, Lakeside Woods had a population of 309.

Lakeside Woods was first listed as a CDP prior to the 2020 census.
