= Sherman Historic District (Sherman, Connecticut) =

Historic district in Connecticut, United States

- U.S. National Register of Historic Places
- U.S. Historic district
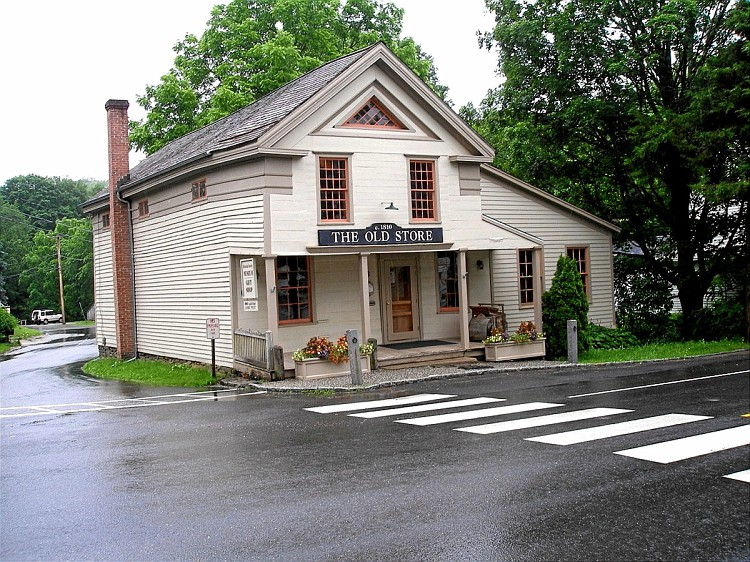
- The "Old Store"

- Location within Connecticut Location within the United States
- Location: Roughly, Junction of Old Greenswood Road and CT 37 Center Northeast past Junction of CT 37 East and CT 39 North, and Sawmill Road, Sherman, Connecticut
- Coordinates: 41°34′44″N 73°29′51″W
- Area: 85 acres (34 ha)
- Architectural style: Greek Revival, Colonial, Federal
- NRHP reference No.: 91000956
- Added to NRHP: July 31, 1991

The Sherman Historic District encompasses the historic town center of Sherman, Connecticut. It covers an 85-acre (34 ha) historic district area centered on the junction of Connecticut Routes 37 and 39, and consists mostly of residential structures, some of them dating to not long after the town's incorporation in 1740. Most of the village center was developed in the 19th century. Notable buildings include the 1837 Greek Revival Center Church (now used as a performance space), the 1886 Old Town Hall, and the 1926 Colonial Revival library building.

The district was listed on the National Register of Historic Places in 1991.

== See also ==
- Sherman Historic District
- National Register of Historic Places listings in Fairfield County, Connecticut
