= Kakamega Orphan Project =

Non-profit organization

The Kakamega Orphans Care Centre (KOCC) is a grassroots organization in Kakamega, Kenya, that helps provide for the education and wellbeing of orphans and vulnerable children in western Kenya. The organization directly supports more than 150 elementary school students, more than 150 high school students, and about 25 college and university students.

Friends of Kenya Rising, a 501(c)(3) non-profit organization based in Sherman, Connecticut, was founded in 2003 and raises funds and organizes sponsorships to support these children and youth in Kakamega, Kenya. It was formed from the merger of Crossroads Springs Africa and Friends of Kakamega.

== Overview ==
The organization's programs include elementary school sponsorships, high school sponsorships, and college/university sponsorships.

In the same age group, more than 100 elementary school children are supported by the Homebased sponsorship program, living in loving homes with extremely needy aunts, uncles, grandmothers, and single mothers. In the Homebased program, guardians receive a small cash stipend, farm inputs, and a few basic needs that help improve the sponsored child's wellbeing at home and in school.

The High School sponsorship program continues support for the students who graduated 8th grade, providing school fees, uniforms, books and supplies, pocket money, and other essentials - as well as guidance and support - to more than 150 high school students.

The College & University program supports more than 25 students and is proud to already have over 10 diploma- and degree-holding graduates.

The majority of funding for KOCC comes from donors in the United States and Canada, through the Friends of Kakamega. However, local Kenyans also do their best to support the project financially or in kind.

== History ==
The project was started in 2002, when Dorothy Selebwa from Kakamega visited the Northeast of the United States. Focusing especially on Quaker meetinghouses, her fundraising tour brought the plight of Kenya's needy children and AIDS orphans to the attention of many Quakers. Several Maine women, including Sukie Rice, Molly Duplisea-Palmer, and Sharon Salmon, decided to start a fundraising organization to support the feeding program. Soon, Friends of Kakamega planned a dining hall, and later a dormitory-style Care Center. In 2004, the dining hall was opened, and by 2005 the dorms were completed and full of children. Support for children in their family homes, through the Homebased Program, was introduced shortly afterward. As students graduated 8th grade and moved on in school, the High School program was born. Similarly, the college & university program was introduced after the first students graduated from high school, and today there are already more than 10 college & university graduates and more than 25 current college & university students.
