= New Fairfield High School =

Location
- 54 Gillotti Road; New Fairfield, Connecticut 06812; United States; 41°27′40″N 73°30′27″W

Information
- Type: Public school
- Motto: Respect-Engage-Belong-Excel-Lead
- Established: 1973 (53 years ago)
- CEEB code: 070476
- Principal: James D’Amico
- Faculty: ~80
- Grades: 9 – 12
- Enrollment: 693 (2024-2025)
- Colors: Red, white, navy blue
- Mascot: Rebel
- Team name: Rebels
- Accreditation: NEASC
- Website: www.newfairfieldschools.org/o/nfhs

New Fairfield High School is the only public high school in New Fairfield, Connecticut, United States. It enrolls approximately 500 to 700 students annually in grades 9-12 from New Fairfield, as well as students from the neighboring town of Sherman who elect to attend. James D'Amico (class of 1994) was named principal of New Fairfield High School in 2019.

The school mascot is the "Rebel," depicted on school symbols as a Revolutionary War soldier. This mascot was chosen by students at the school in celebration of the United States Bicentennial in 1976, as that was the first graduating class.

NFHS was ranked #59 by U.S. News & World Report among high schools in Connecticut for 2019.

== History ==
Prior to the 1970s, students from New Fairfield attended Danbury High School for grades 9-12. In 1971, the town decided to open its own high school, and hired architect Theodore Strauss of Katonah, New York to design the building. The land selected was over one-hundred acres of former farmland and woods located on Gillotti Road, west of Hidden Valley Pond and Meeting House Hill School. Construction began in 1972 on the school, which opened for the 1973–1974 school year. At the time of opening, the building had several deficiencies. The problems are outlined in the so-called "Werner Report", commissioned by the Board of Selectmen in 1976.

Once the school opened in 1973, it would house students in grades 7-10, with juniors and seniors still attending school in Danbury. The first graduating class was the Class of 1976. Legend has it that this first cohort wished for the school teams to be named the Seventy-Sixers, to both honor the nation's bicentennial and the first NFHS graduates. However, the more universal "Rebels" was chosen, the first depiction of which was General David Wooster, a Revolutionary War hero who was mortally wounded at the Battle of Ridgefield after the British raid on Danbury in 1777.

The school was constructed with open classrooms in most areas that were retrofitted with walls in later years, including significant alterations completed in the 1990s as part of the construction of the New Fairfield Middle School addition. There were also significant upgrades and expansion of science lab facilities in 2010, and the culinary arts facilities in 2018.

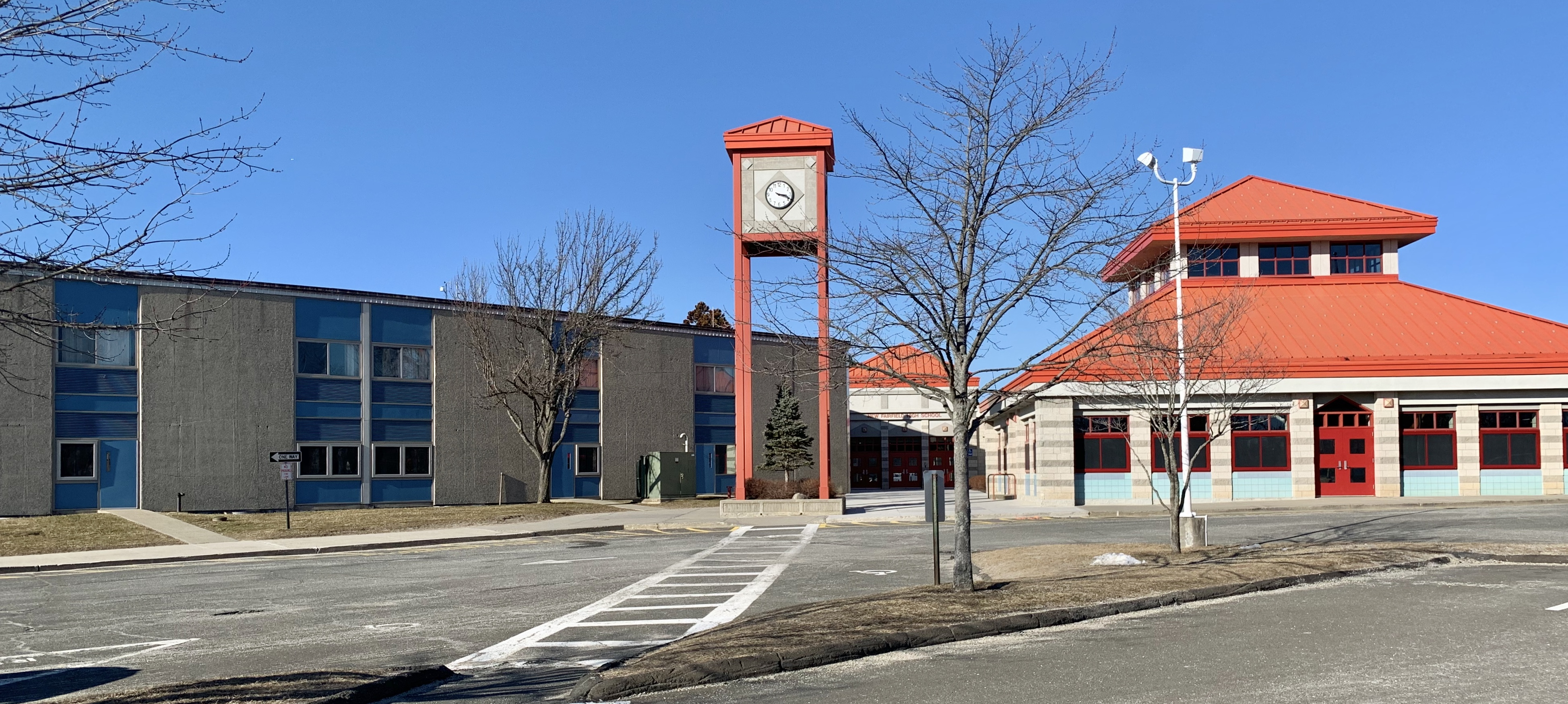
Front of NFHS, February 2020

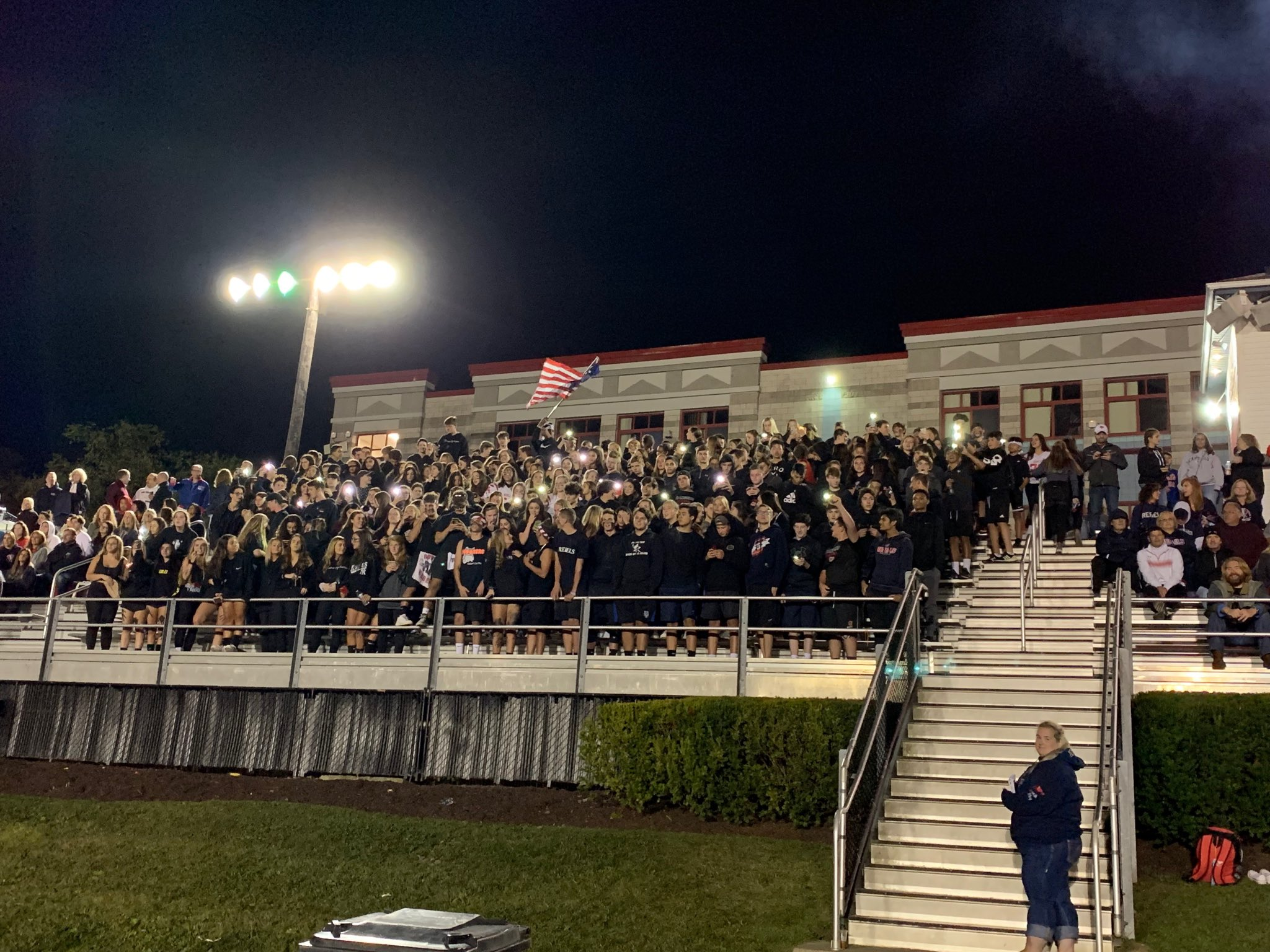
NFHS “Rowdy Rebels” student section

=== Construction of new building ===
In October 2019, the town of New Fairfield passed a referendum to construct a new building to house New Fairfield High School, as well as a new addition to Meeting House Hill School, which will house the grades currently located at Consolidated Elementary School. The new school will be located on the same campus as the original building, which will be torn down upon completion of construction, except for the gymnasium, pool, and cafeteria, which will be repurposed for community use. Architectural firm JCJ Architecture, of Hartford, Connecticut, was selected by the town's Permanent Building Committee to design the new schools.

The new building opened before the 2023–2024 academic year at a cost of $84 million. It is 146,000 square feet (13,600 m^{2}).

== Academics ==
=== Graduation requirements ===
In order to earn a diploma from New Fairfield High School, students must earn a minimum of twenty-six credits, including a community service requirement and the Senior Enrichment Experience (SEE) project. All students must pass and earn credit according to the following distribution: A minimum of four credits in English; three credits each of Math, Science, and Social Studies; two credits each in Physical Education & Health and Fine & Applied Arts; one credit each of World Language and SEE; one-half credit each of School & Community Service and Personal Finance; and six additional elective credits. Beginning with the Class of 2023, three and one-half credits of Social Studies, one credit of Fine & Performing Arts, one-half additional credit in English, Social Studies or Fine & Performing Arts, one credit of Career/Technology Education, two additional credits of Math, Science, and/or Career/Technology Education will be required as part of the twenty-six credits necessary to graduate.

=== Advanced offerings ===
==== Early college experience courses ====
New Fairfield High School offers several courses in which students can earn college credit while taking an advanced level course during high school. The school partners with both the University of Connecticut, Western Connecticut State University, and the University of Bridgeport to offer these courses. For the 2020–2021 school year, Early College Experience offerings are as follows:

- University of Connecticut: Young Americans, Biology*, Physics*
- Western Connecticut State University: Spanish Language* and Culture, Calculus AB*, Calculus BC*, Statistics*
- University of Bridgeport: Pre-Calculus Honors

*indicates that course runs concurrently with an AP course offering

=== Elective programs ===
The Connecticut Wing Civil Air Patrol 801st New Fairfield Cadet Squadron (NER-CT-801) operated out of the school, the squadrons charter was deactivated due to low membership. The school also has a highly regarded band and choir that performs throughout the year.

== Athletics ==
=== Program offerings ===
New Fairfield High School has twenty-four varsity level sports programs, all of which participate in the South West Conference (SWC). Prior to the beginning of play in this conference in the fall 1995 season, New Fairfield was a member of the former Western Connecticut Conference (WCC). Most home athletic contests take place on the school campus, with facilities including 2 gymnasiums (basketball, cheerleading, volleyball, wrestling), NFHS Pool (swim & dive), Rebels Stadium (football, cross country, outdoor track), Marty Morgan Turf (field hockey, lacrosse, soccer), John Pendergast Turf Field, and fields for baseball, tennis, and softball. The Rebels golf team plays there matches at Club River Oaks in Sherman, CT.

The Rebels' main rivals in the SWC are the New Milford High School Green Wave, most notably in football. The two schools meet annually for the Thanksgiving "Candlewood Cup" game, named for Candlewood Lake, which both towns border. The Rebels are the current holders of the cup (as of November 27, 2025)

Current athletics programs offered at the school:

- Fall: Cheerleading, Boys and Girls Cross Country, Field Hockey, Football, Boys Soccer, Golf, Girls Volleyball, Girls Soccer, Girls Swimming & Diving
- Winter: Boys and Girls Basketball, Boys and Girls Indoor Track, Boys Swimming and Diving, Wrestling
- Spring: Baseball, Boys and Girls Lacrosse, Boys and Girls Outdoor Track, Softball, Boys and Girls Tennis

=== Championships ===
The Rebels have a rich athletic tradition, with 34 state championships and 32 league championships. The first league championship won by a school team was the 1977 baseball team, and the Softball team claimed the first Connecticut state championship for the school in 1980. Recently, the girls basketball team won the 2017 state title, as did the girls cross country team in 2018. During the last several years, both lacrosse teams have been dominant, with the girls winning state titles in 2017, 2018, 2019, 2021, 2022, 2024, and 2025, joined by the boys who won state championships in 2018, 2019, 2024, and 2025. The Rebels athletic department is currently run by Athletic Director Mark Ottusch.

State Championships	League Championships
Basketball (Girls): 1991, 1992, 2017; Cross Country (Boys): 2013; Cross Country (Girls): 2008, 2009, 2013, 2018, 2022, 2024, 2025; Field Hockey: 2008; Indoor Track (Boys): 2013, 2014; Lacrosse (Boys): 2003, 2018, 2019, 2024, 2025; Lacrosse (Girls): 2005, 2017, 2018, 2019, 2021, 2022, 2024, 2025; Softball: 1980, 1999; Tennis (Girls): 1986; Wrestling: 1993, 1997, 1998, 2016 (Open)	WCC 1974-1995, SWC 1995-Present: Baseball: 1977, 1988, 2016; Basketball (Girls): 1999, 2015; Cross Country (Girls): 2014; Football: 1990, 2015; Ice Hockey (Boys): 2014, 2016; Indoor Track (Boys): 2014; Lacrosse (Boys): 2008, 2010, 2017, 2018, 2019, 2021, 2025; Lacrosse (Girls): 2005, 2018, 2019, 2025; Volleyball (Girls): 1988, 1989, 1992, 1998; Wrestling: 1989, 1990, 1993, 1994, 1997, 1998

== Notable alumni ==
- Rich Bisaccia (Class of 1979), Las Vegas Raiders Interim Head Coach and Special Teams Coordinator
- Jake Ceresna (Class of 2012), American football defensive end for the Edmonton Eskimos
- Ken Jurkowski (Class of 1999), Olympic Rower 2008 & 2012
- Jennifer Rizzotti (Class of 1992), NCAA champion and professional basketball player and collegiate coach, Women's Basketball Hall of Fame 2013 inductee
