= WRBI =

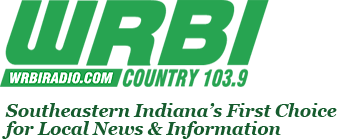
- Batesville, Indiana; United States
- Broadcast area: Southeastern Indiana
- Frequency: 103.9 MHz
- Branding: Country 103.9

Programming
- Format: Country
- Affiliations: Cincinnati Reds Radio Network

Ownership
- Owner: Randy Lawson and Brent Lee; (Leeson Media, LLC)

History
- Call sign meaning: Radio Batesville Incorporated

Technical information
- Licensing authority: FCC
- Facility ID: 2873
- Class: A
- ERP: 2,650 Watts
- HAAT: 108 meters (354 ft)
- Transmitter coordinates: 39°13′22″N 85°15′28″W

Links
- Public license information: Public file; LMS
- Website: wrbiradio.com

WRBI (103.9 FM) is a radio station broadcasting a Country format. Licensed to Batesville, Indiana, United States, it serves the Southeastern Indiana area. The station is currently owned by Leeson Media LLC (Brent Lee and Randy Lawson). Leeson purchased the station from White River Broadcasting Co., Inc. February 1, 2013.
