= Batesville Tool & Die =

Batesville Tool & Die, Inc.
- Company type: Private Company
- Industry: Precision Metal Stamping
- Founded: Batesville, Indiana (1978)
- Headquarters: Batesville, Indiana
- Key people: Jody Fledderman (President & CEO)
- Products: Automotive Parts, Appliance Parts
- Number of employees: 321 (2013)
- Website: www.btdinc.com

Batesville Tool & Die, Inc. is a precision metal stamping company that supplies parts to the automotive, appliance, and global industrial markets. It is a privately held company headquartered in Batesville, Indiana. In addition to the Batesville facility, parts are also manufactured at the Troqueladora Batesville de México plant in Querétaro, Mexico. This satellite plant began production in 2000.

The company was founded in 1978 by Ron Fledderman along with his business partners. Bob Hotel is the companies current president. Ron Fledderman's son, Jody Fledderman, is currently the CEO. Jody is also serving as the President of the Precision Metalforming Association.
