= Central Batesville Historic District =

Historic district in Indiana, United States

- U.S. National Register of Historic Places
- U.S. Historic district
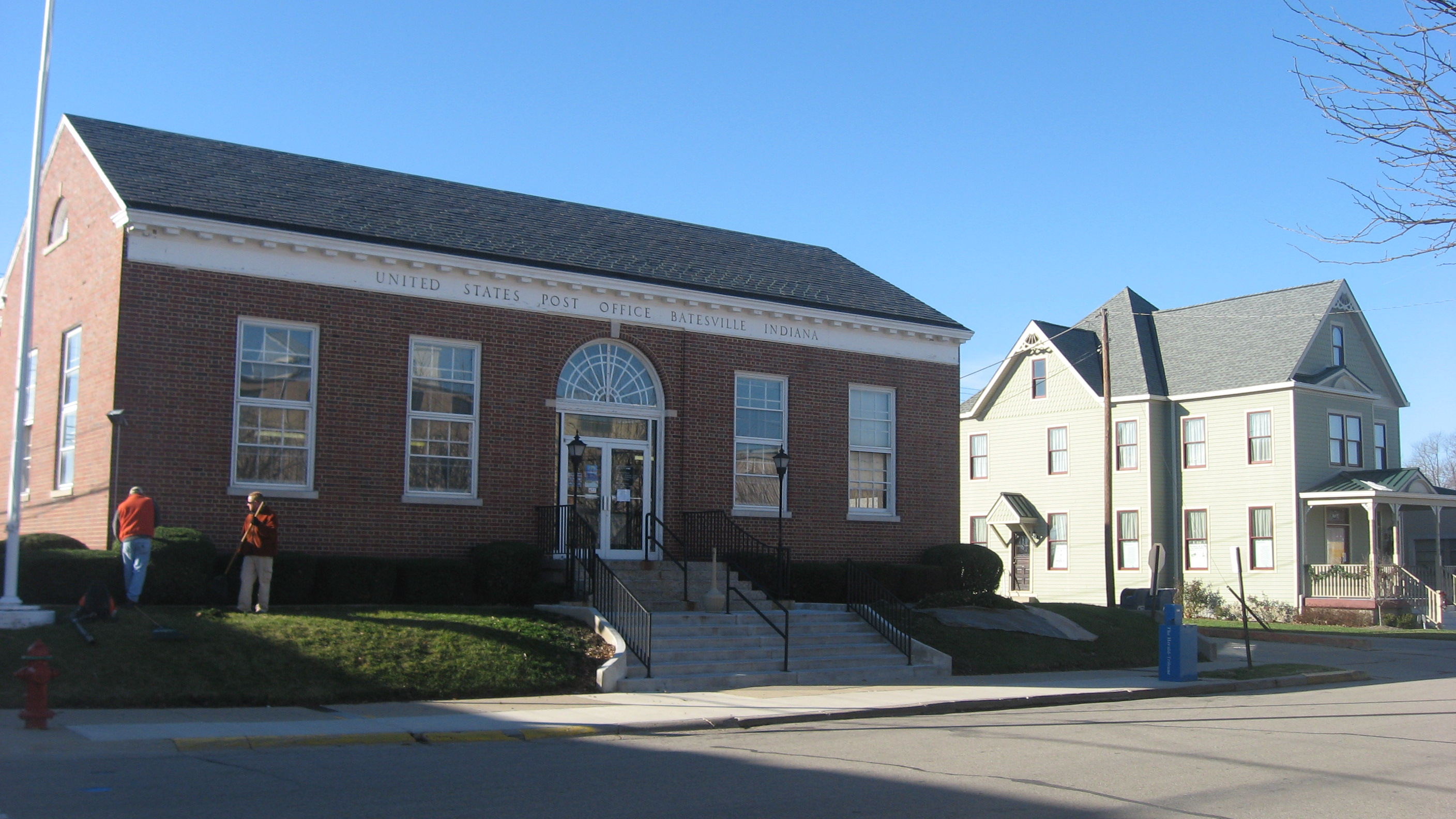
- Batesville Post Office, December 2012

- Location within Indiana Location within the United States
- Location: Roughly bounded by Catherine, Vine, and Boehringer Sts., and Eastern Ave., Batesville, Indiana
- Coordinates: 39°17′52″N 85°13′19″W
- Area: 23 acres (9.3 ha)
- Built: 1852
- Architect: Simon, Louis A.; Henkel, Karl P.; George L. Mesker & Co.
- Architectural style: Multiple
- NRHP reference No.: 11000659
- Added to NRHP: September 15, 2011

Central Batesville Historic District is a national historic district located at Batesville, Indiana. The district encompasses 44 contributing buildings and three contributing structures in the central business district and surrounding residential sections of Batesville. The district developed between about 1852 and 1960 and includes notable examples of Italianate, Queen Anne, Colonial Revival, Tudor Revival, Classical Revival, and Streamline Moderne style architecture. Notable buildings include the a gas station (c. 1960), Hillenbrand Buildings (c. 1879–1940), Batesville Bank (c. 1895, 1910, 1922), Gibson Theatre (1921), Sherman House (1852), Batesville Memorial Building (1922–1923), German Methodist Church (1889), Boehringer Hall (1856), St. Mark's Evangelical Lutheran Church (1897–1898), Baas-Nolte Building and House (1880), Batesville Post Office (1936–1937), and Batesville Telephone Building (c. 1955).

It was added to the National Register of Historic Places in 2011.
