= New Milford High School (Connecticut) =

- New Milford High School, as seen from the north end.

Location
- 388 Danbury Road; New Milford, Connecticut 06776; United States; 41°31′36″N 73°25′31″W

Information
- Type: Public
- School district: New Milford
- CEEB code: 070545
- Principal: Raymond Manka
- Teaching staff: 100.62 (on FTE basis)
- Grades: 9 through 12
- Enrollment: 1,207 (2023-2024)
- Student to teacher ratio: 12.00
- Colors: Green and white
- Athletics conference: Southwestern Connecticut
- Mascot: Tsunami
- Nickname: Green Wave
- Team name: Wave
- Rivals: New Fairfield Rebels, Brookfield Bobcats
- Website: www.newmilfordps.org/new-milford-high-school/

New Milford High School is a public high school in New Milford, Connecticut. Currently, approximately 1,238 students attend the school. Although a majority of the students attending the school are from New Milford, others are from the nearby town of Sherman. The school is located at 388 Danbury Road in the town of New Milford and is a part of the New Milford School District. Other high schools in the district include the Canterbury School and the Faith Church Preparatory School, although New Milford High School is the only public high school.

== Athletics ==
The New Milford High School Boys' cross-country (X-Country) team won its tenth consecutive Southwest Conference (SWC) title in 2011. The New Milford High Schools softball team was runner up in Southwest Conference (SWC) losing to Brookfield in 2026 3-1. they went the season 19-1.

== Miscellaneous ==
New Milford is also known for appearing in the film "Zero Day" as, "Iroquois High".

It’s theatre department has had many successful productions over the years, most notably a production of Legally Blonde. This production featured Meadow Hall as Vivienne Kensington, who went to the 2025 Jimmy Awards for her portrayal as that role.
