= Sherman (CDP), Connecticut =

Census-designated place in Connecticut, United States

Sherman, Connecticut
- Census-designated place
- Location within Connecticut Location within the United States
- Coordinates: 41°34′43″N 73°29′50″W
- Country: United States
- State: Connecticut
- County: Fairfield
- Town: Sherman

Area
  - Total: 0.36 sq mi (0.94 km^{2})
  - Land: 0.35 sq mi (0.90 km^{2})
  - Water: 0.012 sq mi (0.03 km^{2})
- Elevation: 500 ft (150 m)

Population (2020)
  - Total: 115
- Time zone: UTC-5 (Eastern (EST))
  - Summer (DST): UTC-4 (EDT)
- ZIP Code: 06784
- Area codes: 860/959
- FIPS code: 09-68240
- GNIS feature ID: 2805968

Sherman is a census-designated place (CDP) comprising the central community in the town of Sherman, Fairfield County, Connecticut, United States. It is in the central part of the town, at the north end of Candlewood Lake. The Sherman Historic District covers 85 acres (34 ha) in the northern part of the CDP, at the intersection of Connecticut Routes 37 and 39, containing many of the oldest buildings in the town.

Sherman was first listed as a CDP prior to the 2020 census.
