= Sherman Historic District =

Sherman Historic District may refer to:

in the United States (by state)

- Sherman Historic District (Sherman, Connecticut), listed on the National Register of Historic Places (NRHP) in Connecticut
- Sherman Hill Historic District, Des Moines, Iowa, listed on the NRHP
- Sherman Historic District (Sioux Falls, South Dakota), listed on the NRHP in South Dakota
- Sherman Avenue Historic District, Madison, Wisconsin, listed on the NRHP in Dane County

== See also ==
- Sherman House (disambiguation)
- The Sherman (disambiguation)
