= Batesville Casket Company =

American company

- Industry: Funeral Services
- Founded: Batesville, Indiana (1884)
- Headquarters: Batesville, Indiana
- Products: Caskets, Cremation urns
- Revenue: ▲$640 million USD (2004)
- Number of employees: 3,460 (2007)
- Parent: LongRange Capital (2023–present)
- Website: www.batesville.com

Batesville Casket Company manufactures caskets and cremation urns. The company was a subsidiary of Hillenbrand, Inc. until its divestiture in 2023 and is headquartered in Batesville, Indiana.

The company operates three manufacturing plants in Batesville, Indiana, Chihuahua, Mexico, and Manchester, Tennessee, and a woodworking factory in Vicksburg, Mississippi, that supplies wood to the factory in Chihuahua.

The company was established in 1884, when John A. Hillenbrand began producing handmade wooden caskets. These caskets had ornate carvings made by casket and furniture companies. In 1906, Hillenbrand purchased the failing Batesville Coffin Company, and renamed it to Batesville Casket Company.

The company's successful business strategy was noted by George Stalk, a Boston Consulting Group writer, in 2004:

Batesville Casket is the world-leading manufacturer of welded steel caskets. In the 1970s, Batesville endeavoured to reduce its manufacturing costs by transplanting automotive manufacturing techniques to its industry. The impact on Batesville’s less sophisticated competitors was stunning. In the 1990s, Batesville set its sights on those competitors with positions in major metropolitan markets. To get at them, Batesville had to offer greater variety and faster response times at affordable prices. Batesville Casket accomplished this with remarkable success by transplanting Toyota’s production system.
