= Batesville, Indiana =

- City
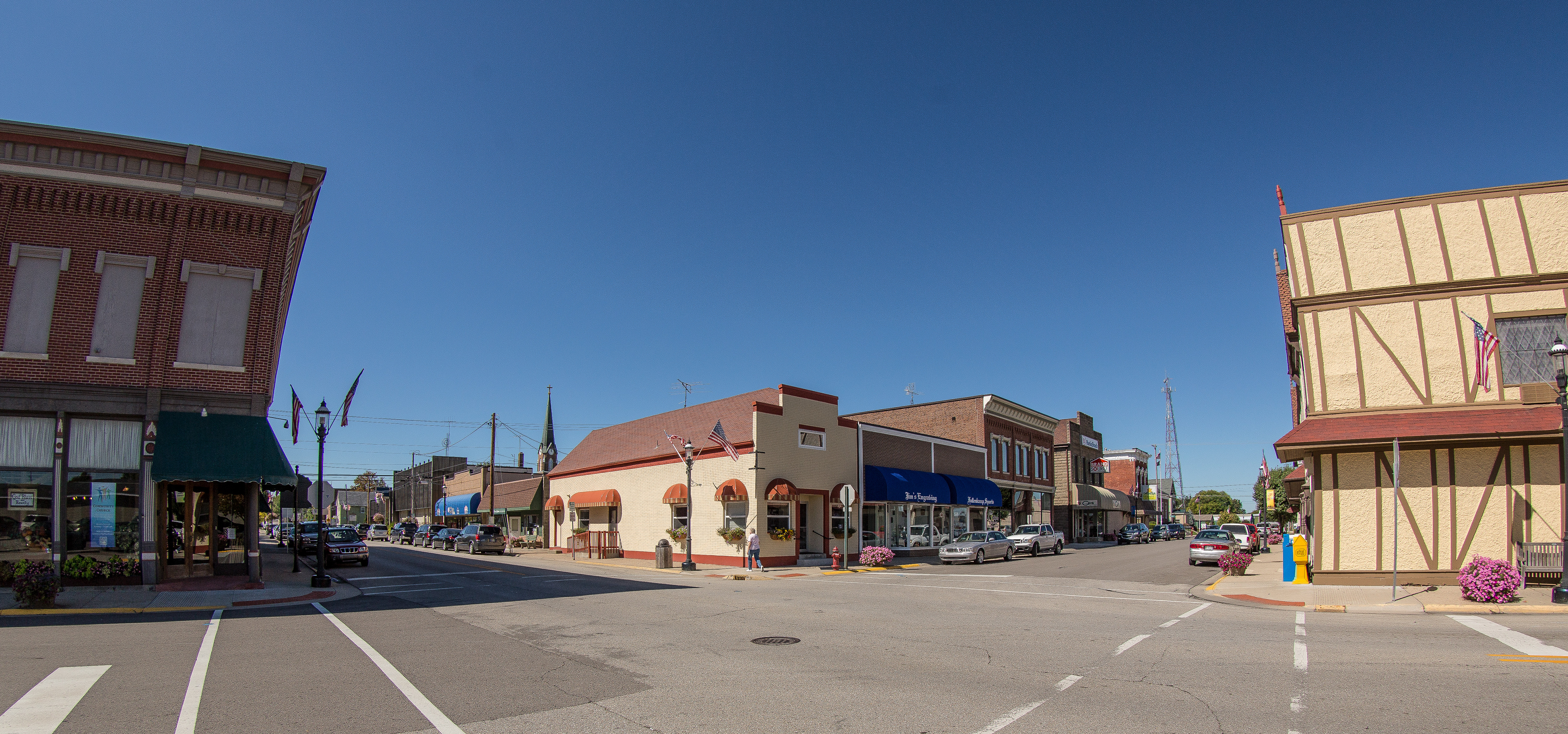

- Flag Logo

- Location of Batesville in Ripley County and Franklin County, Indiana.

- Location in Indiana Batesville (the United States) Batesville (North America)
- Coordinates: 39°18′04″N 85°14′07″W
- Country: United States
- State: Indiana
- Counties: Ripley, Franklin
- Townships: Adams, Laughery, Ray

Government
  - Mayor: John Irrgang (R)

Area
  - Total: 6.17 sq mi (15.98 km^{2})
  - Land: 6.10 sq mi (15.81 km^{2})
  - Water: 0.066 sq mi (0.17 km^{2})
- Elevation: 942 ft (287 m)

Population (2020)
  - Total: 7,202
  - Density: 1,179.8/sq mi (455.52/km^{2})
- Time zone: UTC-5 (EST)
  - Summer (DST): UTC-4 (EDT)
- ZIP code: 47006
- Area code: 812
- FIPS code: 18-03664
- GNIS feature ID: 2394080
- Website: www.batesvilleindiana.us

Batesville is a city in Ripley and Franklin counties in the U.S. state of Indiana. The population was 7,202 at the 2020 census, making it the largest community in both counties, although it is not the county seat of either. The Batesville Casket Company is headquartered in the city. Batesville is noted for its central location between Indianapolis, Cincinnati, and Louisville, on the I-74 corridor.

== History ==
Central Batesville Historic District was listed on the National Register of Historic Places in 2011.

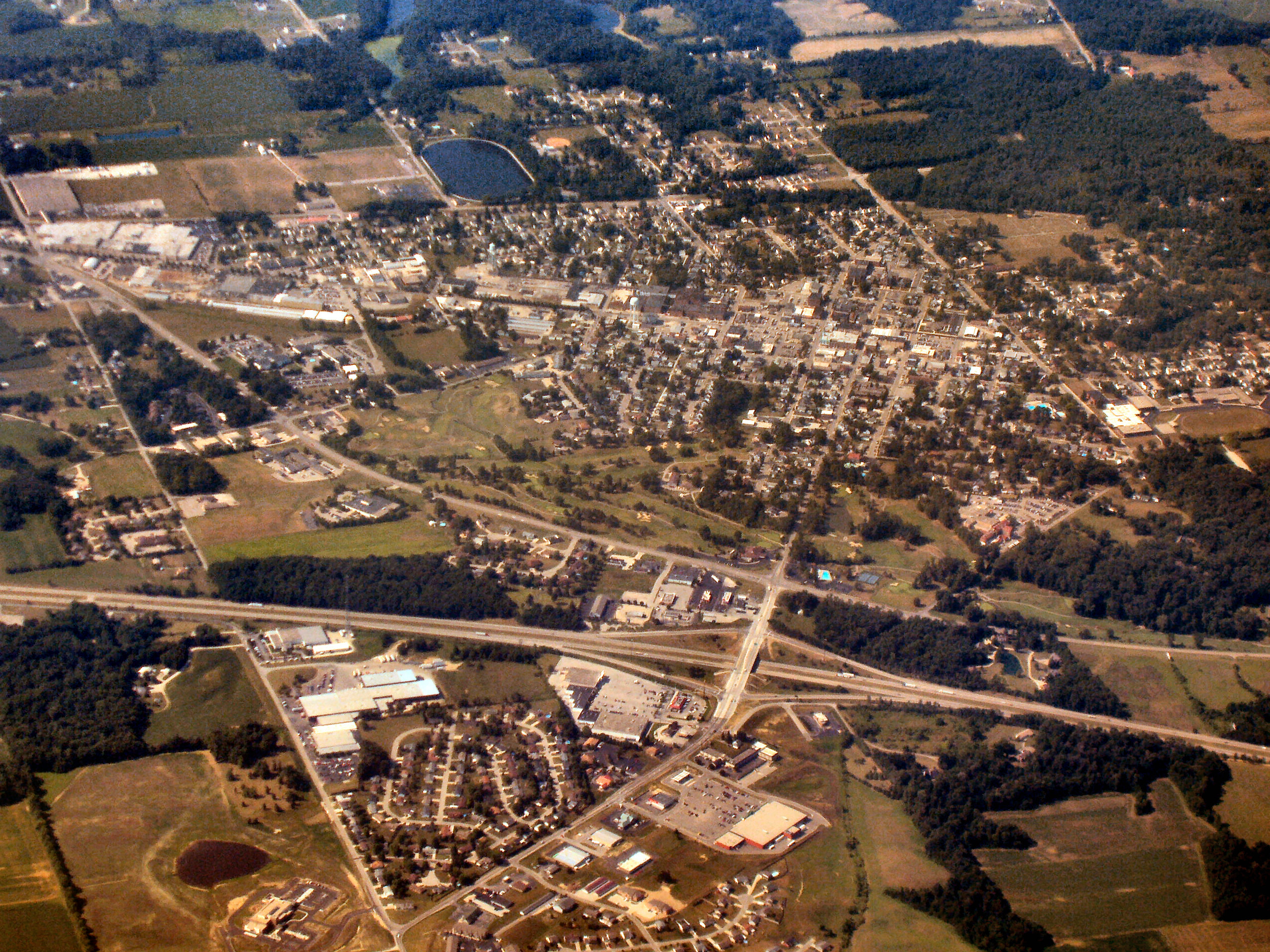
Batesville from the air, looking southwest

=== Beginning ===
Batesville was founded by George H. Dunn, owner of the John Callahan Trust Company. The company bought land and created new towns along rail lines that it began since Dunn was president of the Cincinnati and Indianapolis Railroad. Joshua Bates, who platted the town of Batesville, is thought to be the source of the name. On November 1, 1853, the first train from Cincinnati to Indianapolis passed through Batesville.

=== Development ===
Once the railway opened, Dunn and Bates constructed more buildings. George Sims laid out Batesville's first addition in 1858. The following year, German immigrant Henry Boehringer became Batesville's first major builder. A three-story building with a basement on East Pearl Street (formerly known as Broadway Street) became known as the Boehringer Hall because of the dance floor on the third story. The Catholic congregation used the basement before they had built their church.

Louis Walter established Batesville's first gristmill in 1858. Between 1860 and 1870, Boehringer built a row of apartments and homes on the north side of Batesville on Boehringer Street. Along with building the apartments and housing, Boehringer owned the lot where the Ward School now stands. In 1863 Conrad Rapp purchased numerous lots on East Broadway and bought Walter's gristmill. In 1865, John Brinkman built a hotel and restaurant called the Sherman House, named after William Tecumseh Sherman, a major general that led the Union Army to its final victory of the Civil War in a campaign that became known as "Sherman's March to the Sea".

Sebastian Messersmith built Union Hall in 1865. It was a two-story building on the west side of Main Street (Batesville, Indiana)|Main Street and just north of South Street (Batesville, Indiana)|South Street. Union Hall was used by the fire department for meetings and it was used by the public school while the school building was being rebuilt. It was also used as a boarding house for mill workers and visiting lumber salesman. This was an important building to the citizens of Batesville. Batesville has been known for its many factories built between the 1870s and the present.

In 1873 the Greeman Bracket Company began manufacturing under the Greeman family name, which was one of the leading businesses for 30 years. The Schrader Furniture Factory was built in 1873, but had to be rebuilt in 1875 after the factory was destroyed by a fire. When the founder Herman Schrader died, the business was bought by John and William Hillenbrand. In 1874, the Union Furniture Factory also burned down and the Blank Bros. Furniture Manufacturing Company was erected the following year. Also, in 1879, Batesville published its first newspaper, The Prairie Farmer.

During the 1880s the town of Batesville started its first form of government appointed by the community. The first mayor was George M. Hillenbrand. The first town board served without pay. The board consisted of five officers: Jacob Blank Jr., John Lehmkuehler, John Hillenbrand, William Hillenbrand, and Christian Schwieler. Much of the money that was put toward the town came directly out of the officers' pockets. For example, in February 1883, they donated $153.06 to go toward paying for the town's bills. By September, when the financial report was reviewed, Batesville only had $1.82 in its account. Also during 1883, Batesville began major road construction.

In 1884 Batesville organized the Batesville Casket Company. It was managed by J. Spiegel and later purchased by George M. Hillenbrand in February 1906. Also in 1884, the town jail was completed at a cost of $211.55. The inmates were forced to break stone to pay for their stay in the prison.

Several developments took place in 1887, including new additions to the town and telephone connections to the town of Oldenburg. These developments were funded by a grant applied for by Mr. Haverkos. Also in 1887, John Hillenbrand and Victor Oberting opened a stone quarry on some of Mr. Hillenbrand's land near Batesville. In December 1887, the town hall was completed. The town hall was separated into two parts: one for the town board and the other for the fire company. The town hall was also rented out for public gatherings.

In March 1888, the school board made a decision to construct an addition onto the schoolhouse. This proposal estimated that the total cost of the addition would be $1,500. Also in 1888, the first city attorney (James H. Connelly) was appointed at a salary of $35 per year, and many new businesses were added. In this year, Henry F. E. Schrader moved to Batesville and opened a tin shop and built homes. Also, Henry H. Kramer started a grocery store on the corner of Walnut and Boehringer. As well as new stores, a covered bridge was built over the Laughery Creek, making travel much easier.

In 1889, Batesville finally paved its roads with stone that came from the Hillenbrand and Oberting Stone Quarry. As well as the paving of the roads, Batesville opened the Batesville State Bank. In February 1890, Batesville had built its first sidewalks. Also in the 1890s, street lamps were introduced to Batesville. Originally, these lamps were oil lamps. However, in October, a proposal was written to turn them all into electric lamps, but the proposal was denied. On January 29, 1894, the first electric lamp was placed in front of Town Hall.

In 1895 a petition was written and accepted to build another school. The total estimated cost would be $5,700. The land would cost $700 and the school building would cost $5,000. In 1897 Batesville decided to stop the use of the electric lamps because of the rates that people had to pay to keep them going, but then in 1898 Batesville decided that they would reduce the rates and only use the lamps when needed.

== Geography ==
According to the 2010 census, Batesville has a total area of 6.156 square miles (15.94 km^{2}), of which 6.09 square miles (15.77 km^{2}) (or 98.93%) is land and 0.066 square miles (0.17 km^{2}) (or 1.07%) is water.

=== Climate ===
The climate in this area is characterized by hot, humid summers and generally mild to cool winters. According to the Köppen Climate Classification system, Batesville has a humid subtropical climate, abbreviated "Cfa" on climate maps.

== Economy ==
There are two large publicly traded companies headquartered in Batesville. There are also smaller manufacturing companies in Batesville, as well as a telecommunications company formerly known as Enhanced Telecommunications Corporation, that serves several surrounding towns and cities like Greensburg. Metal parts manufacturer Batesville Tool & Die is based in the city.

Batesville Casket has been in business since 1884 and is still a flourishing business for Batesville. Batesville Casket is one of the leading casket companies in the US

The largest industry in Batesville is the manufacturing of hospital and health care equipment, most notably hospital beds. William Hillenbrand and his aunt Mary Mitchell founded HillRom in 1927. The business grew rapidly after the Great Depression ended. William convinced hospitals to use his wooden hospital bed for six months free of charge.

== Government ==
Batesville is an incorporated city governed by a mayor and a five-member city council. Four of the city council members are elected by four districts while the fifth is elected at-large by the community as a whole. The city also elects a city judge and city clerk treasurer. The mayor, city council members, judge, and clerk treasurer all serve four year terms. John Irrgang is the current mayor of Batesville.

== Transportation ==
The main mode of transportation in the Batesville area is via road. There are several major routes that intersect the city.

- Interstate 74

Batesville is located on I-74 between Indianapolis to the west and Cincinnati to the east. The interstate bisects the northern part of the city. While most of Batesville is located south of the interstate, some businesses and residences are located north of the interstate.

- Indiana 229

Indiana 229 runs from north to south through the center of the city. It connects Batesville with Oldenburg to the north and Indiana 48 to the south. A portion of Main Street and Walnut Street run concurrent with Indiana 229 through the city center.

- Indiana 46

Indiana 46 runs east to west through Batesville connecting it with Greensburg to the west and several small communities to the east. Indiana 46 runs parallel to Interstate 74.

There is also a railroad, owned by the Central Railroad Comp. of Indiana, that runs through Batesville that connects Indianapolis to Cincinnati. This line is limited to freight.

There are no available taxi or limousine services operating in Batesville. Greyhound Lines buses ceased service in Batesville on June 20, 2005.

== Education ==
Batesville has one public school corporation, Batesville Community Schools, which consists of Batesville Primary, Batesville Intermediate, Batesville Middle, and Batesville High School. As of the 2011–2012 school year, there were approximately 2,083 students enrolled in the district.

The only private school, St. Louis Catholic School, enrolls about 420 students in its K-8 program at St. Louis Parish and 50 students at St. Louis Catholic Preschool.

Ivy Tech Community College has a campus at Batesville, a branch of Ivy Tech Southeast.

The town has a lending library, the Batesville Memorial Public Library.

== Recreation ==
Batesville is also home to a few outdoor recreation facilities. Batesville Liberty Park is the main public park in Batesville. Liberty Park offers many recreational activities such as horseshoes, volleyball, baseball, basketball, playground sets, and a large pavilion. Batesville also offers walking and biking trails, a skatepark and pump track. The main bike and running trails are located in Brum Woods, 80 acres (320,000 m^{2}) of woods donated by Lena Brum. Batesville also contains a golf course, Hillcrest Country Club and Golf Course. Batesville is also home to the Southeast Indiana YMCA.

Batesville also has a movie theater, The Gibson Theatre. Built in 1921 by Dr. C. W. Gibson, the theater features a unique neon-lit look.

== Media ==
Batesville has one radio station, country format station WRBI (103.9 FM). WRBI is owned by White River Broadcasting Co., Inc. This station also provides local news and sports to the community.

== Demographics ==
Historical population
Census	Pop.	Note	%±
1890	1,169		—
1900	1,384		18.4%
1910	2,151		55.4%
1920	2,361		9.8%
1930	2,838		20.2%
1940	3,065		8.0%
1950	3,194		4.2%
1960	3,349		4.9%
1970	3,799		13.4%
1980	4,152		9.3%
1990	4,720		13.7%
2000	6,033		27.8%
2010	6,520		8.1%
2020	7,202		10.5%
U.S. Decennial Census

=== 2020 census ===
As of the 2020 census, Batesville had a population of 7,202. The median age was 39.5 years. 24.8% of residents were under the age of 18 and 19.6% of residents were 65 years of age or older. For every 100 females there were 88.7 males, and for every 100 females age 18 and over there were 83.7 males age 18 and over.

96.9% of residents lived in urban areas, while 3.1% lived in rural areas.

There were 2,816 households in Batesville, of which 32.4% had children under the age of 18 living in them. Of all households, 48.9% were married-couple households, 15.2% were households with a male householder and no spouse or partner present, and 29.5% were households with a female householder and no spouse or partner present. About 30.8% of all households were made up of individuals and 15.4% had someone living alone who was 65 years of age or older.

There were 2,957 housing units, of which 4.8% were vacant. The homeowner vacancy rate was 0.7% and the rental vacancy rate was 4.6%.

Racial composition as of the 2020 census
Race	Number	Percent
White	6,494	90.2%
Black or African American	29	0.4%
American Indian and Alaska Native	18	0.2%
Asian	167	2.3%
Native Hawaiian and Other Pacific Islander	2	0.0%
Some other race	139	1.9%
Two or more races	353	4.9%
Hispanic or Latino (of any race)	278	3.9%

=== 2010 census ===
As of the 2010 U.S. census, there were 6,520 people, 2,492 households, and 1,678 families residing in the city. The population density was 1,070.6 inhabitants per square mile (413.4/km^{2}). There were 2,712 housing units at an average density of 445.3 per square mile (171.9/km^{2}). The racial makeup of the city was 95.1% White, 0.3% African American, 0.2% Native American, 1.7% Asian, 0.1% Pacific Islander, 1.6% from other races, and 1.0% from two or more races. Hispanic or Latino of any race were 3.3% of the population.

There were 2,492 households, of which 38.4% had children under the age of 18 living with them, 53.6% were married couples living together, 10.0% had a female householder with no husband present, 3.8% had a male householder with no wife present, and 32.7% were non-families. 28.4% of all households were made up of individuals, and 12.9% had someone living alone who was 65 years of age or older. The average household size was 2.55 and the average family size was 3.16.

The median age in the city was 38.2 years. 28.6% of residents were under the age of 18; 6.4% were between the ages of 18 and 24; 24.7% were from 25 to 44; 24.5% were from 45 to 64; and 15.9% were 65 years of age or older. The gender makeup of the city was 47.7% male and 52.3% female.

=== 2000 census ===
As of the census of 2000, there were 6,033 people, 2,240 households, and 1,581 families residing in Batesville. The population density was 1,036.2 inhabitants per square mile (400.1/km^{2}). There were 2,335 housing units at an average density of 401.0 per square mile (154.8/km^{2}). The racial makeup of the town was 97% White, 0.02% African American, 0.1% Native American, 1.1% Asian, 0.9% from other races, and 0.6% from two or more races. Hispanic or Latino of any race were 1.2% of the population.

There were 2,240 households, out of which 38% had children under the age of 18 living with them, 60% were married couples living together, 8.2% had a female householder with no husband present, and 29.4% were non-families. 25.9% of all households were made up of individuals, and 11.0% had someone living alone who was 65 years of age or older. The average household size was 2.6 and the average family size was 3..

The population age is spread out, with 28.5% under the age of 18, 6.4% from 18 to 24, 30.4% from 25 to 44, 20.9% from 45 to 64, and 13.8% who were 65 years of age or older. The median age was 36 years. For every 100 females, there were 91.6 males. For every 100 females age 18 and over, there were 88.5 males.

The median income for a household in the town was $50,115, and the median income for a family was $58,590. Males had a median income of $38,862 versus $29,127 for females. The per capita income for the town was $21,892. About 2.4% of families and 3.5% of the population were below the poverty line, including 1.1% of those under age 18 and 6.9% of those age 65 or over.
