= Jake Ceresna =

American football player and coach (born 1994)

- Ceresna with the Winnipeg Blue Bombers in 2026

No. 94 – Winnipeg Blue Bombers
- Position: Defensive lineman
- Roster status: Active
- CFL status: American

Personal information
- Born: July 9, 1994 (age 32); New Fairfield, Connecticut, U.S.
- Listed height: 6 ft 5 in (1.96 m)
- Listed weight: 290 lb (132 kg)

Career information
- High school: New Fairfield
- College: Southern Connecticut State (2012); Cortland (2013–2015)
- NFL draft: 2016: undrafted

Career history

Playing
- New York Jets (2016)*; Ottawa Redblacks (2017); Edmonton Eskimos (2018); New York Giants (2019)*; Edmonton Eskimos / Elks (2019–2023); Toronto Argonauts (2024); Edmonton Elks (2025); Winnipeg Blue Bombers (2026–present)
- * Offseason or practice squad member only

Coaching
- Cortland (2016) Assistant offensive line coach

Awards and highlights
- Grey Cup champion (2024); 2× CFL All-Star (2022, 2024); 2x CFL West All-Star (2022, 2026); CFL East All-Star (2024)

Career CFL statistics as of 2025
- Games played: 102
- Tackles: 201
- Sacks: 46
- Forced fumbles: 7
- Fumble recoveries: 0
- Stats at CFL.ca
- Stats at Pro Football Reference

Jacob Tanner Ceresna (born July 9, 1994) is an American professional football defensive end for the Winnipeg Blue Bombers of the Canadian Football League (CFL). He played college football at Cortland. Ceresna has also been a member of the New York Jets, Ottawa Redblacks, Toronto Argonauts, Edmonton Elks, and New York Giants.

== College career ==
Ceresna played one season for Southern Connecticut State before transferring to SUNY Cortland. He graduated from Cortland with a B.S. cum laude in exercise science in 2016.

== Professional career ==
Pre-draft measurables
Height	Weight	Arm length	Hand span	Wingspan	40-yard dash	10-yard split	20-yard split	20-yard shuttle	Three-cone drill	Vertical jump	Broad jump	Bench press
6 ft 5 1/8 in (1.96 m)	291 lb (132 kg)	32 3/8 in (0.82 m)	9 3/4 in (0.25 m)	6 ft 6 in (1.98 m)	4.98 s	1.75 s	2.81 s	4.54 s	7.30 s	31.5 in (0.80 m)	9 ft 7 in (2.92 m)	35 reps
All values from Pro Day

=== New York Jets ===
After going undrafted in the 2016 NFL draft, Ceresna signed with the New York Jets on August 14, 2016. He was Waived/Injured on August 30, 2016, and placed on the injury reserve after sustaining a lower body injury.

=== Ottawa Redblacks ===
After recording two sacks and eighteen tackles in his rookie season, Ceresna was traded to the Edmonton Eskimos for defensive end Odell Willis.

=== Edmonton Eskimos (first stint) ===
Ceresna amassed 32 defensive tackles and eight sacks in 18 games with the Eskimos. Ceresna was released by the Eskimos on January 2, 2019, in order for him to sign with the New York Giants.

=== New York Giants ===
On January 2, 2019, Ceresna signed a reserve/future contract with the New York Giants. Ceresna was released by the Giants on August 31, 2019, during final roster cuts.

=== XFL ===
In October 2019, Ceresna was drafted by the DC Defenders in the open phase of the 2020 XFL draft. Ceresna decided to not sign with the XFL and to remain in the CFL, citing the lack of a Players Association.

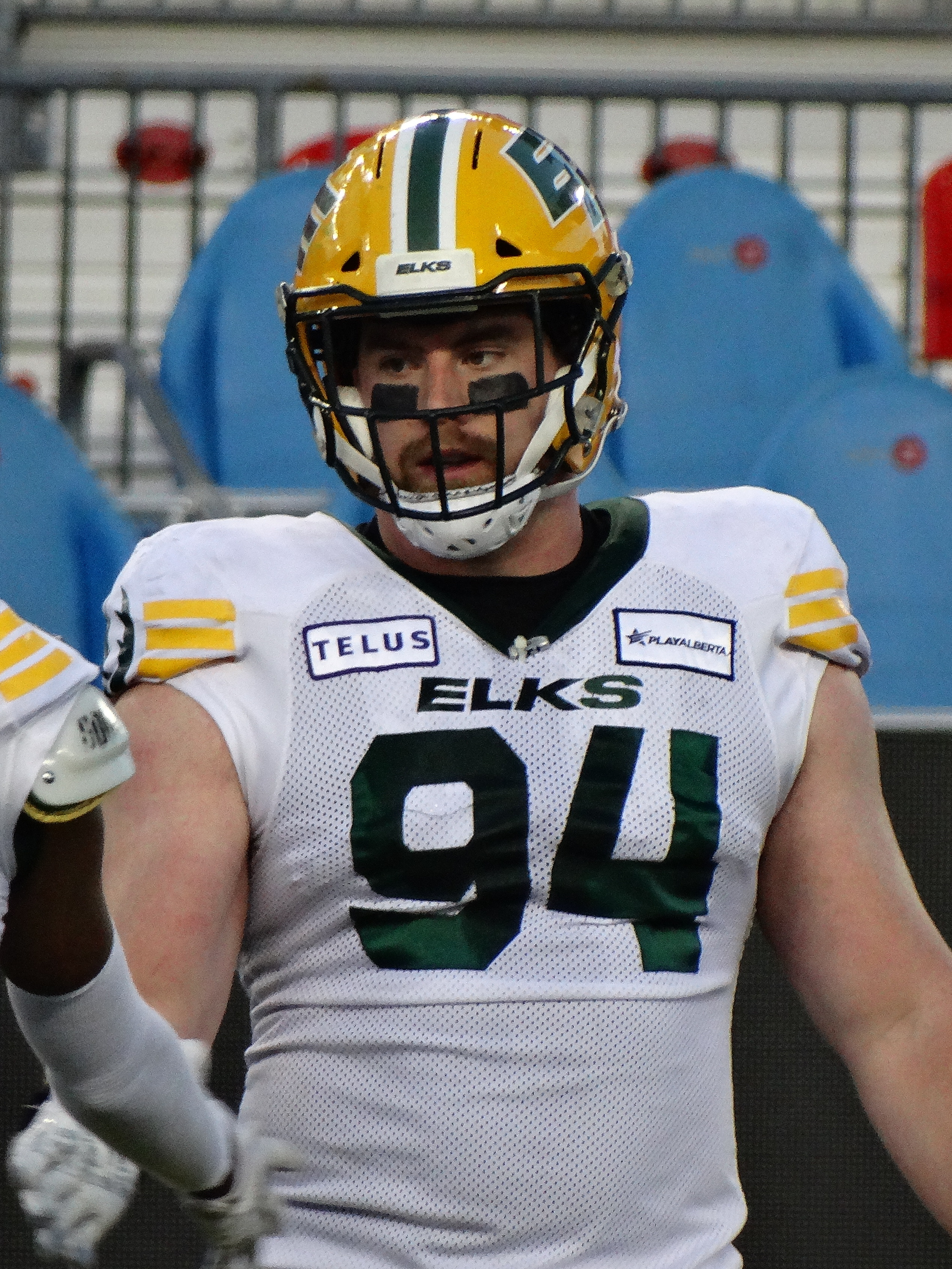
Ceresna with the Edmonton Elks in 2023

=== Edmonton Eskimos / Elks (second stint) ===
On November 5, 2019, Ceresna was signed to the Eskimos' practice roster after a brief stint with the New York Giants. He signed a futures contract for the 2020 season on November 19, 2019, however the season was later cancelled due to the COVID-19 pandemic. In his first season back with Edmonton Ceresna played in 13 of 14 regular season games, contributing with a career high 34 defensive tackles and five sacks. He signed a contract extension through the 2022 season on January 11, 2021. Ceresna had a breakout campaign in 2022, registering 10 quarterback sacks and he was named a CFL All-Star as a result. On January 11, 2023, Ceresna and the Elks agreed to a two-year contract extension. On July 5, 2023, Ceresna was fined the maximum amount by the league after his low hit on Ottawa quarterback Tyrie Adams the prior weekend. The play resulted in Adams suffering an ACL injury that ended his season.

=== Toronto Argonauts ===
On January 15, 2024, Ceresna was traded to the Toronto Argonauts in exchange for Kurleigh Gittens Jr. and a 7th round pick in the 2024 CFL draft. In 2024, he played and started in 17 regular season games where he recorded 29 defensive tackles, eight sacks, and one forced fumble. For his strong season, he was named to the All-CFL team for the second time in his career. Ceresna started in all three post-season games, including the 111th Grey Cup where he had one defensive tackle in the Argonauts' 41–24 victory over the Winnipeg Blue Bombers. He became a free agent upon the expiry of his contract on February 11, 2025.

=== Edmonton Elks (third stint) ===
Ceresna returned to the Elks through free agency on February 12, 2025. However, his season was limited due to injuries and he played in just 11 games where he recorded 16 defensive tackles, one sack, and one interception. With his one-year contract expiring, his playing rights were transferred to the Winnipeg Blue Bombers on February 6, 2026.

=== Winnipeg Blue Bombers ===
As a pending free agent, it was reported on February 1, 2026, that Ceresna had agreed to terms with the Winnipeg Blue Bombers during the free agency negotiation window. In an unprecedented move, the Elks transferred his playing rights to the Blue Bombers for no compensation on February 6, 2026, three days before his contract would have expired. He then signed a two-year contract with the Blue Bombers.

== Coaching career ==
Ceresna was briefly the assistant offensive line coach for Cortland State before he signed with the New York Jets.
