= Rich Bisaccia =

American football coach (born 1960)

Clemson Tigers
- Title: Special teams coordinator

Personal information
- Born: June 3, 1960 (age 66); Yonkers, New York, U.S.

Career information
- High school: New Fairfield High School
- College: Yankton (1979–1982)

Career history
- Wayne State (1983–1987); Defensive backs coach & special teams coach (1983); Quarterbacks & wide receivers coach (1984–1987); South Carolina (1988–1993); Graduate assistant, tight ends & wide receivers coach (1988); Volunteer assistant, defensive ends coach & special teams coach (1989–1990); Volunteer assistant, tight ends coach & special teams coach (1991); Running backs coach & special teams coach (1992–1993); Clemson (1994–1998) Running backs coach & special teams coach; Ole Miss (1999–2001); Running backs coach & special teams coach (1999); Assistant head coach, running backs coach & special teams coach (2000–2001); Tampa Bay Buccaneers (2002–2010); Special teams coordinator (2002–2007); Assistant head coach, running backs coach & special teams coordinator (2008); Assistant head coach & special teams coordinator (2009–2010); San Diego Chargers (2011–2012); Special teams coordinator (2011); Assistant head coach & special teams coordinator (2012); Dallas Cowboys (2013–2017) Assistant head coach & special teams coordinator; Oakland / Las Vegas Raiders (2018–2021); Assistant head coach & special teams coordinator (2018–2021); Interim head coach (2021); Green Bay Packers (2022–2025); Special teams coordinator (2022); Assistant head coach & special teams coordinator (2023–2025); Clemson (2026–present) Special teams coordinator

Awards and highlights
- Super Bowl champion (XXXVII)

Head coaching record
- Regular season: 7–5 (.583)
- Postseason: 0–1 (.000)
- Career: 7–6 (.538)
- Coaching profile at Pro Football Reference

Richard Bisaccia (born June 3, 1960) is an American football coach who is currently serving as the special teams coordinator at Clemson University. He was previously an assistant coach for the Dallas Cowboys, San Diego Chargers, Tampa Bay Buccaneers and Green Bay Packers, and on top of his assistant role, was an interim head coach for the Las Vegas Raiders in 2021, leading the Raiders to the playoffs in his lone season.

== Early life and early career ==
Born in Yonkers, New York, Bisaccia moved with his family to New Fairfield, Connecticut at 9 years old. He later graduated from New Fairfield High School. Bisaccia played college football at Yankton College, where he was a 4-year starter and two-time all-conference defensive back. He was also a team captain as a senior in 1982. After graduating from Yankton, he received a tryout for the Philadelphia Stars of the USFL, but did not make the team. Later in 1983, he decided to begin coaching.

== Coaching career ==
=== Wayne State ===
Bisaccia began his coaching career at Wayne State College in 1983. His college head coach Pete Chapman was hired as head football coach at Wayne State and offered Bisaccia a position on his staff. Bisaccia spent the 1983 season coaching defensive backs and special teams. From 1984-1987, he coached quarterbacks and wide receivers at Wayne State. He earned a Bachelor of Science in Physical Education degree with a minor in Health Education from Wayne State while coaching there.

=== South Carolina ===
In 1988, Bisaccia joined the University of South Carolina as a graduate assistant, tight ends and wide receivers coach. In 1989, he transitioned to be their defensive backs and special teams coach. In 1991, he was their tight ends and special teams coach and as their running backs and special teams coach in 1992. Under Bisaccia, the Gamecocks led the SEC in kickoff returns in 1992 and set a school record for blocked kicks.

=== Clemson ===
In 1994, Bisaccia was hired by Clemson University as their running backs and special teams coach where he served in that role until 1998.

=== Ole Miss ===
In 1999, Bisaccia joined the University of Mississippi (Ole Miss) as their running backs and special teams coach. In 2000, he was promoted to assistant head coach.

=== Tampa Bay Buccaneers ===
In 2002, Bisaccia was hired by the Tampa Bay Buccaneers as their special teams coordinator under head coach Jon Gruden. That year, the Buccaneers went to Super Bowl XXXVII and defeated the Oakland Raiders to win the franchise’s first Super Bowl title by a score of 48–21. In 2007, Micheal Spurlock, under Bisaccia's special teams unit, became the first player in franchise history to return a kickoff for a touchdown, snapping a 32-season streak. In 2008, Bisaccia was promoted to assistant head coach, running backs coach and special teams coordinator. In 2009, Bisaccia was retained as assistant head coach and special teams coordinator under new head coach Raheem Morris.

=== San Diego Chargers ===
In 2011, Bisaccia was hired by the San Diego Chargers as their special teams coordinator under head coach Norv Turner. In 2012, he was promoted to assistant head coach.

=== Auburn ===
In January 2013, Bisaccia was hired to be the assistant head coach, running backs and special teams coach at Auburn University under head coach Gus Malzahn. Auburn released Bisaccia from his contract after less than a month to allow him to sign with the Cowboys.

=== Dallas Cowboys ===
On January 30, 2013, Bisaccia was hired by the Dallas Cowboys as their assistant head coach and special teams coordinator under head coach Jason Garrett. He remained in this position until the end of the 2017 season.

=== Oakland / Las Vegas Raiders ===
In 2018, Bisaccia was hired by the Oakland Raiders as their assistant head coach and special teams coordinator, reuniting with head coach Jon Gruden.

On October 11, 2021, Bisaccia was named the interim head coach of the Raiders following Gruden's resignation. On October 17, 2021, Bisaccia made his head coaching debut against the Denver Broncos and he led the Raiders to a 34–24 win.

Bisaccia led the Raiders to a 7–5 record, and qualified for the playoffs for the first time since 2016 after a win over the Los Angeles Chargers in the final week of the regular season. Bisaccia became the first interim head coach since Bruce Arians with the 2012 Indianapolis Colts to lead his team to a postseason berth.

=== Green Bay Packers ===
On February 8, 2022, Bisaccia was hired by the Green Bay Packers as their special teams coordinator. On March 10, 2023, Bisaccia was promoted to assistant head coach/special teams coordinator. On January 27, 2025, Bisaccia and Green Bay agreed to a contract extension running through the 2026 season. On February 17, 2026, Bisaccia stepped down from the special teams coordinator/assistant head coach position after four years.

=== Clemson (second stint) ===
On March 2, 2026, Bisaccia was hired as the special teams coordinator at Clemson University.

== Head coaching record ==
Team	Year	Regular season					Postseason			
Team	Year	Won	Lost	Ties	Win %	Finish	Won	Lost	Win %	Result
LV*	2021	7	5	0	.583	2nd in AFC West	0	1	.000	Lost to Cincinnati Bengals in AFC Wild Card Game
Total		7	5	0	.583		0	1	.000	

* Interim head coach
