= William B. Sherman Farm =

Historic house in Massachusetts, United States

- U.S. National Register of Historic Places
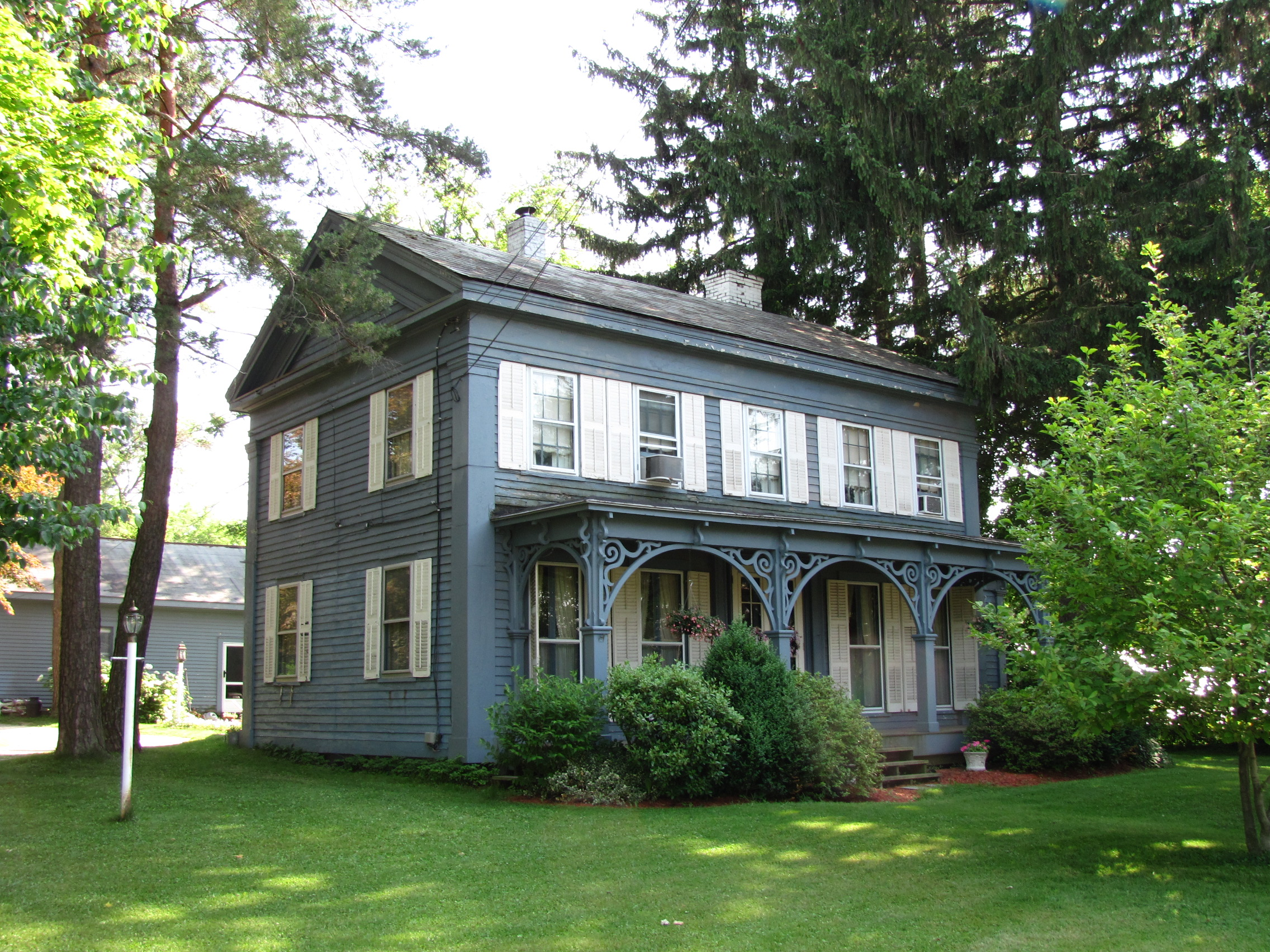
- (2010)

- Location within Massachusetts Location within the United States
- Location: 10072 State Rd. North Adams, Massachusetts
- Coordinates: 42°42′3″N 73°10′24″W
- Built: c. 1830
- Built by: William Sherman
- Architectural style: Greek Revival, Italianate
- MPS: North Adams MRA
- NRHP reference No.: 85003419
- Added to NRHP: October 25, 1985

The William B. Sherman Farm is a historic farmhouse located at 1072 State Road in North Adams, Massachusetts. Built in the 1820s, it is one of the city's few surviving 19th-century houses, with relatively few alterations since its elaborate Italianate porch in the 1870s. It was listed on the National Register of Historic Places in 1985.

== Description and history ==
The William B. Sherman Farm is located in western North Adams, on the south side of State Road (Massachusetts Route 2), near the town line with Williamstown. It is a 2 1/2-story wood-frame structure, with a side-gable roof, two interior chimneys, and a clapboarded exterior. The building corners have broad pilasters, which rise to an entablature that extends beneath fully pedimented gables on the sides. Its main facade is five bays wide, with a single-story porch extending across the front. The porch roof has a cornice adorned with jigsawn brackets, and the spaces between the posts are adorned with large rounded jigsawn woodwork. The ground floor windows under the porch are elongated, and the entry doorway is a French door.

The house was built in the 1820s by William Sherman, a Rhode Island native who moved to the area in 1780. Sherman purchased a large tract of land, then part of Williamstown, in 1813. The land transferred to North Adams jurisdiction in 1900, and most of it was sold off for development in the 20th century, leaving the house standing on a small parcel. The Greek Revival house is one of the oldest surviving farmhouses in North Adams, and is visually distinctive for its Italianate porch, the result of an 1870s period of alteration. Sherman sold his house and farm to his son Eber (who built another house nearby) in 1843. The property then went through a succession of owners.

== See also ==
- National Register of Historic Places listings in Berkshire County, Massachusetts
