= David Sherman (psychologist) =

American psychologist

David Sherman is a psychologist at University of California, Santa Barbara.

== Biography ==
Sherman earned his B.A. in psychology from Cornell University, his Ph.D. in psychology from Stanford University, and completed a post-doctoral fellowship in Health Psychology at UCLA. Sherman’s research, supported by grants from the National Science Foundation, focuses on how individuals respond to self-threatening information and events. He served as Editor of Personality and Social Psychology Review (2018–2021), Associate Editor at the Journal of Personality and Social Psychology (2011–2017), and President of the International Society for Self and Identity (2016–2018).
