= Eber Sherman Farm =

- U.S. National Register of Historic Places
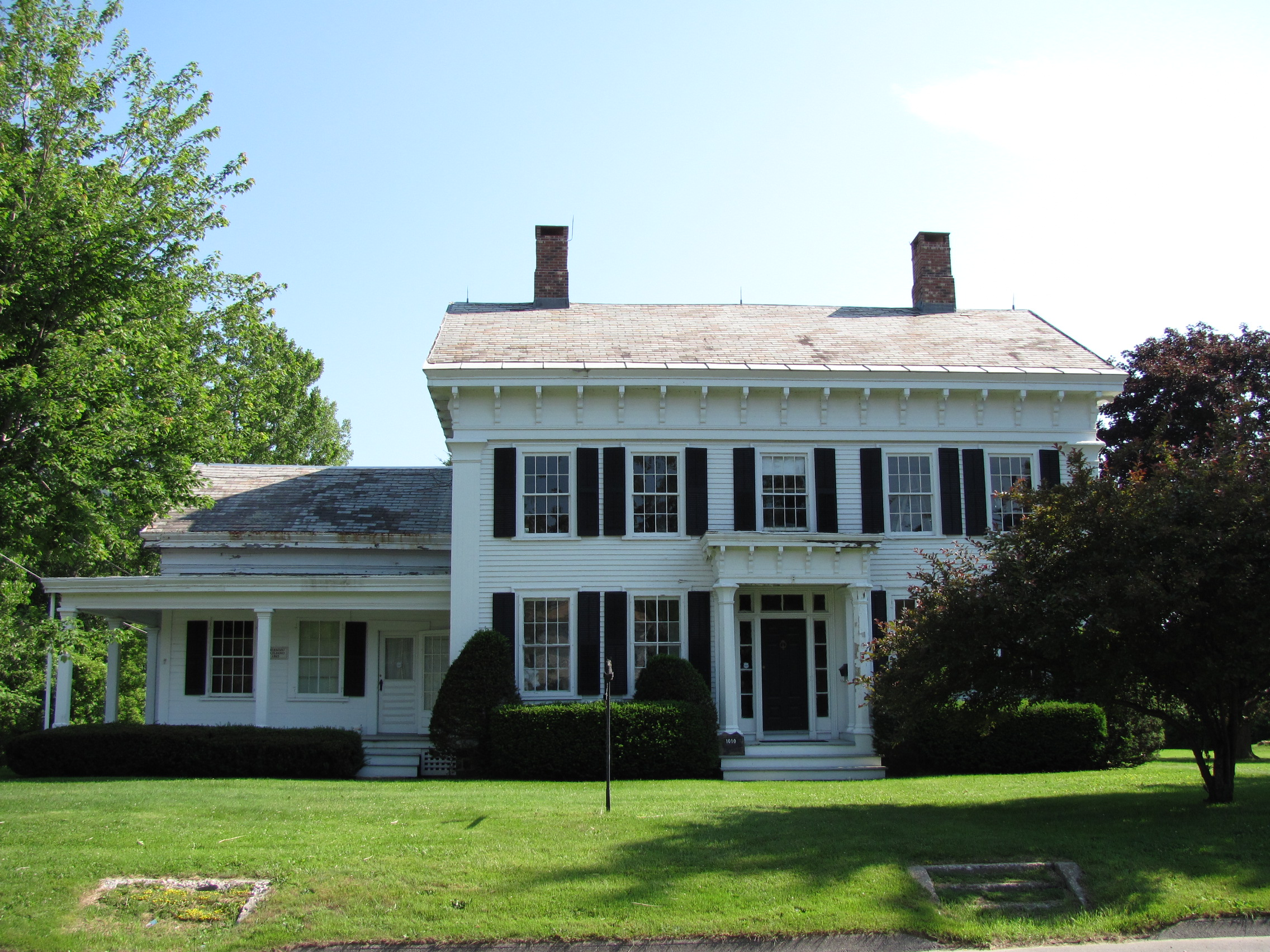
- (2010)

- Location within Massachusetts Location within the United States
- Location: 1010 State Rd., North Adams, Massachusetts
- Coordinates: 42°42′2.952″N 73°10′9.768″W
- Area: 7.8 acres (3.2 ha)
- Built: c. 1843
- Architect: Eber Sherman
- Architectural style: Greek Revival/Italianate
- NRHP reference No.: 83003929
- Added to NRHP: October 6, 1983

The Eber Sherman Farm is a historic farmstead located at 1010 State Road in North Adams, Massachusetts. Built about 1843, it is a well-preserved example of a local variant of transitional Greek Revival and Italianate architecture. It was listed on the National Register of Historic Places in 1983.

== Description and history ==
The Eber Sherman Farm is located on the south side of State Road (Massachusetts Route 2) in western North Adams, near the town line with Williamstown. The main house is a 2 1/2-story wood-frame structure, with a gabled roof, two interior brick chimneys, and a clapboarded exterior. It has a five-bay main facade, with a center entrance flanked by sidelight windows and topped by a transom window. The entry is sheltered by a flat-roof portico with a bracketed frieze supported by fluted columns. The building corners feature wide pilasters, and the roof eave is studded by regularly spaced decorative brackets. A single-story addition extends to the left side, with a porch across its front.

The house was built in about 1843 by Eber Sherman, son of William Sherman (whose farm lay adjacent, and has a similar house), around the time he purchased his father's farm, then over 300 acres (120 ha). It lay in a part of Williamstown that was transferred to North Adams as part of a municipal boundary adjustment in 1900. Eber Sherman ran a dairy operation on the farm, and his son sold the property in 1862, after which it went through a succession of owners.

== See also ==
- National Register of Historic Places listings in Berkshire County, Massachusetts
