= Sherman School (Connecticut) =

School district in Connecticut, United States

Coordinates: 41.578056°N 73.495722°W

District information
- Established: 1937; 88 years ago

Other information
- Website: www.shermanschool.com

The Sherman School is a school district and public elementary and middle school of Sherman, Connecticut.

It opened in 1937 as a consolidation of various schools; the community voted to consolidate on April 18, 1936.
