= Lampson P. Sherman House =

Historic house in Iowa, United States

- U.S. National Register of Historic Places
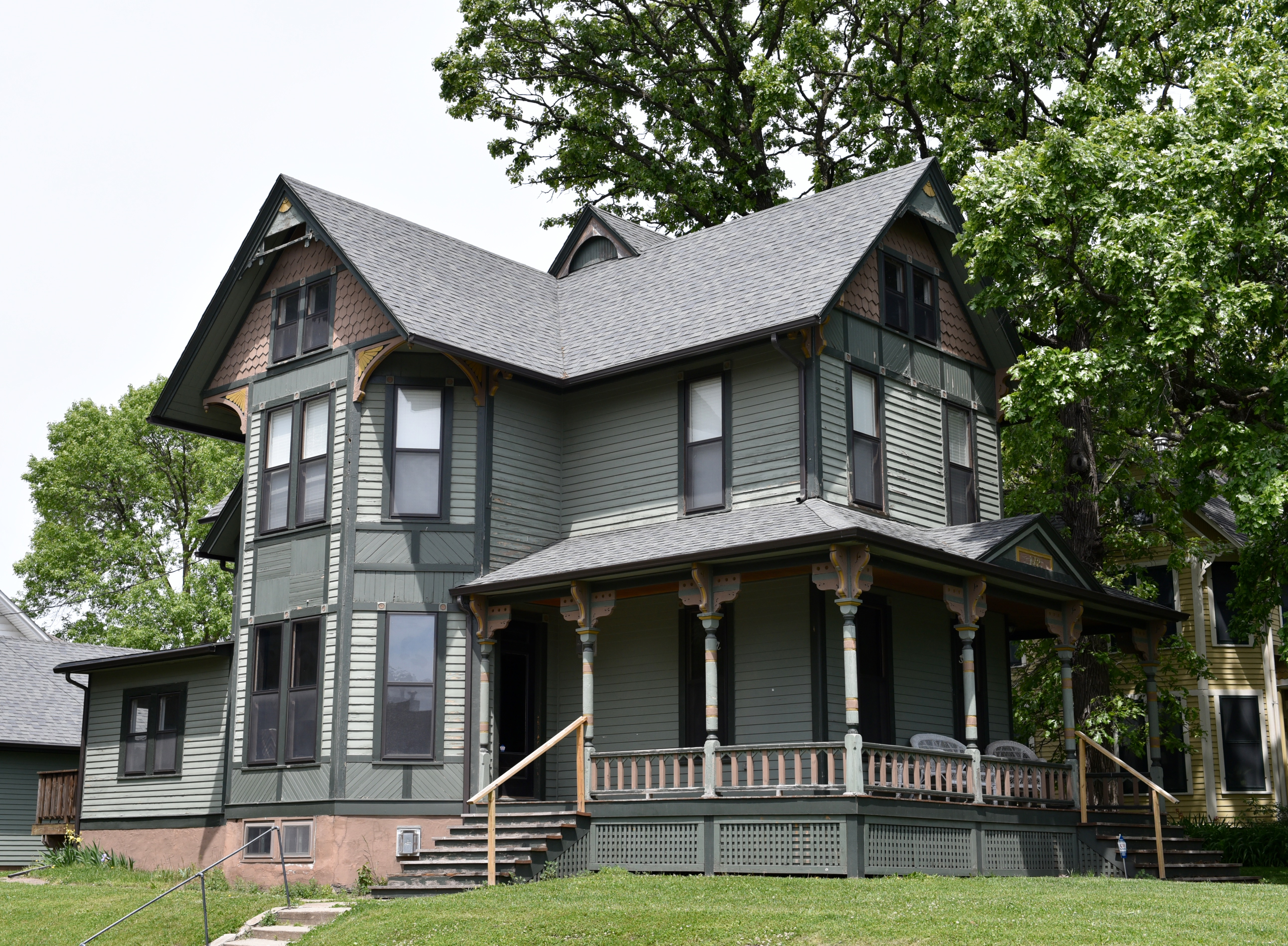

- Location within Iowa Location within the United States
- Location: 1052 26th St., Des Moines, Iowa
- Coordinates: 41°35′48.4″N 93°39′09″W
- Area: less than one acre
- Built: 1888
- Architectural style: Late Victorian
- MPS: Drake University and Related Properties in Des Moines, Iowa, 1881--1918 MPS
- NRHP reference No.: 88001335
- Added to NRHP: September 8, 1988

The Lampson P. Sherman House is a historic building located in Des Moines, Iowa, United States. This 2½-story frame dwelling features crossed gables that create a cross shape, shingles in the gable ends, porch and gable end brackets, and turned porch columns. The property on which it stands is one of ten plats that were owned by Drake University. The house's significance is attributed to the effect of the University's innovative financing techniques upon the settlement of the area around the campus. Hoyt Sherman bought the property from the University Land Company in 1885. The house was built in 1888 and Sherman sold it to his brother Lampson, who was a student at Drake, two years later. The house remained in the Sherman family until 1904. It was listed on the National Register of Historic Places in 1988.
