= The Sherman (Omaha, Nebraska) =

Historic place in Nebraska, United States

- U.S. National Register of Historic Places
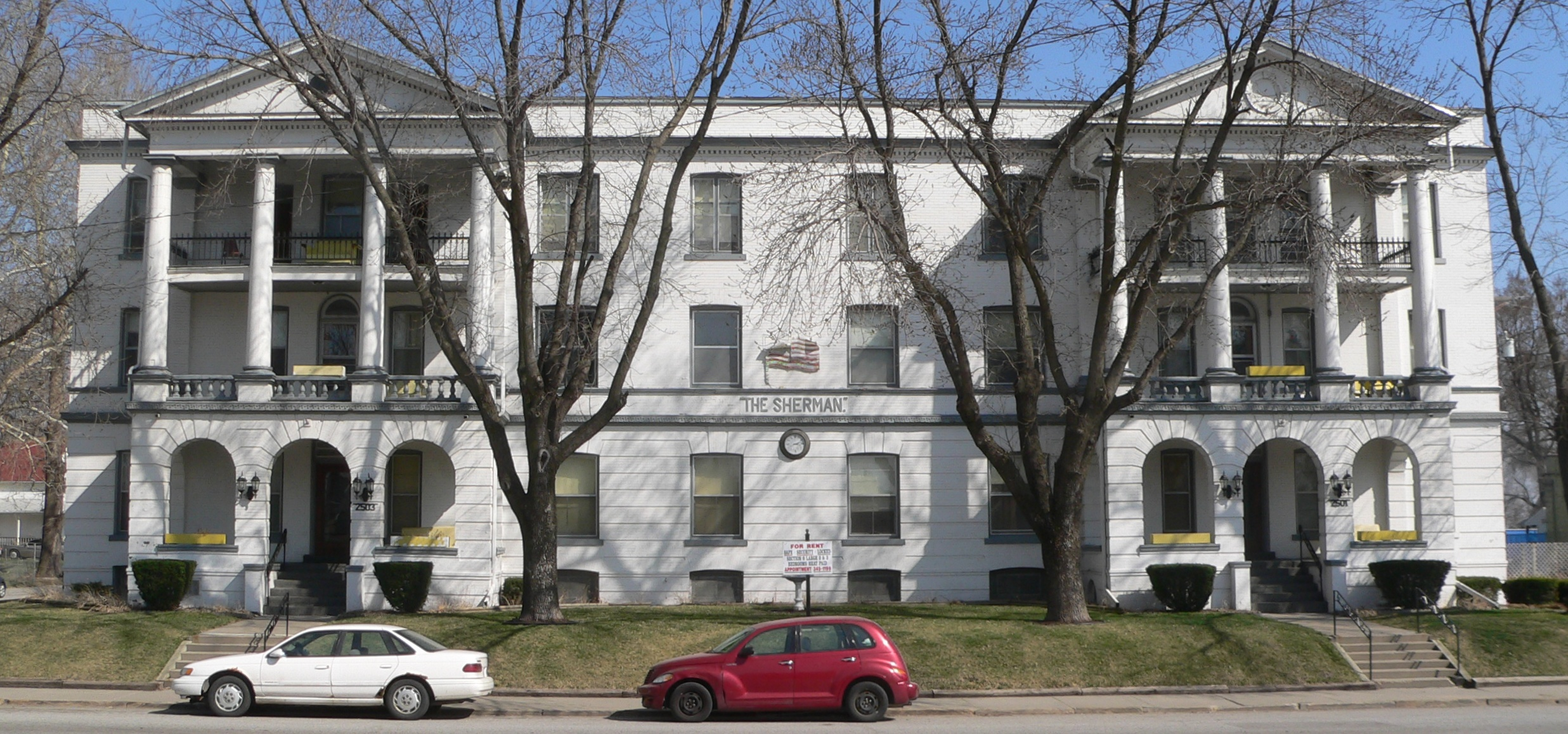

- Location within Nebraska Location within the United States
- Location: North Omaha, Nebraska
- Coordinates: 41°16′54″N 95°56′13.4″W
- Built: 1897
- Architect: Gustav Peterson
- Architectural style: Neo-Classical Revival
- NRHP reference No.: 86000334
- Added to NRHP: 1986

The Sherman is a historically significant apartment building located at 2501 North 16th Street in the Near North Side of Omaha, Nebraska. Built in 1897, it was designated an Omaha landmark in 1985; in 1986 it was listed on the National Register of Historic Places.

== About ==
The Sherman is a Neo-Classical Revival style apartment building, and according to the City of Omaha, was one of the first three apartment buildings constructed in Omaha. Named for Sherman Avenue, the former name of Omaha's North Sixteenth Street, today the three-story building is the oldest apartment building in the city. It has been in continuous use as an apartment since its construction.

George H. Payne, developer of the Sherman, was one of the eleven board of directors of Omaha's 1898 Trans-Mississippi and International Exposition which was held in nearby Kountze Park. The build site of the Sherman was selected because it was on the direct route to the entrance of the impending Trans-Mississippi and International Exposition and at the intersection of two important street car lines. Architecturally the Sherman is unique to the City, exhibiting the influence of the 1893 World's Columbian Exposition. In its use of classical elements, it also anticipates later apartment buildings with its simple, rectangular brick form.

== See also ==
- History of Omaha
- Architecture of North Omaha, Nebraska
- Landmarks in North Omaha, Nebraska
