= David Sherman House =

Historic house in Connecticut, United States

- U.S. National Register of Historic Places
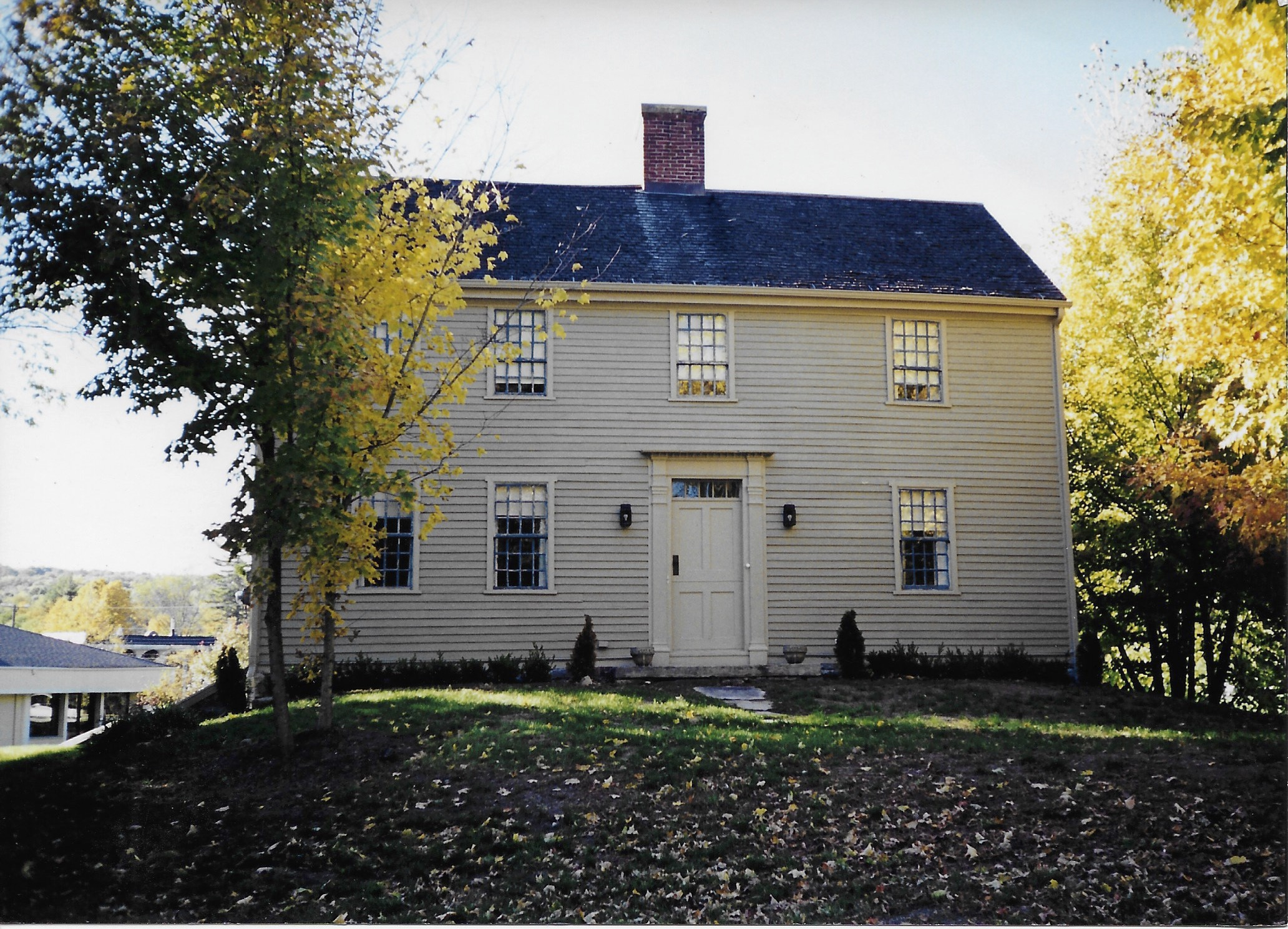

- Location within Connecticut Location within the United States
- Location: Middle Quarter Road, Woodbury, Connecticut
- Coordinates: 41°31′41″N 73°12′2″W
- Area: less than one acre
- Built: 1760
- Architectural style: Colonial
- MPS: Rochambeau's Army in Connecticut, 1780-1782 MPS
- NRHP reference No.: 02000868
- Added to NRHP: August 23, 2002

The David Sherman House is a historic house on Middle Quarter Road in Woodbury, Connecticut. Built about 1760, it is a well-preserved example of Colonial architecture. In 1781, David Sherman is reported to have hosted a ball for officers of the French Army of the Comte de Rochambeau during their march across Connecticut. The house was listed on the National Register of Historic Places in 2002.

== Description and history ==
The David Sherman House is located in southern Woodbury, on the west side of Middle Quarter Road a short way south of its junction with Old Sherman Hill Road. It shares a lot with a commercial property fronting on Connecticut Route 64, from which it is partially screened by vegetation. The house is a 2 1/2-story wood-frame structure, with a side-gable roof, off-center central chimney, and clapboarded exterior. It is four bays wide, with the main entrance in the center-right bay, in front of the chimney. The entry surround, probably of early 19th century date, has fluted pilasters and a corniced entablature; the rest of the house's trim is quite simple. A 1 1/2-story ell, built about 1817, extends to the rear of the main block, which exhibits a saltbox profile.

The house was built about 1760. Its principal significance is in the events of 1781, when the French forces of the Expédition Particulière passed through the region, en route from Providence, Rhode Island to the Siege of Yorktown in the American Revolutionary War. According to local histories first recorded in the 1870s, David Sherman offered some of those troops apples and apple cider, and hosted a social event for officers who had encamped at Newtown, and could reach his house by horse. The event was probably one of the last such social occasions for the French, who went onto tighter discipline after departing Newtown and approaching British-occupied New York City.

== See also ==
- National Register of Historic Places listings in Litchfield County, Connecticut
