= The Sherman (Batesville, Indiana) =

- Location within Indiana

General information
- Location: 35 S. Main St., Batesville, Indiana
- Coordinates: 39.2981°N 85.2231°W
- Completed: 1852

The Sherman, in Batesville, Indiana, is a Tudor-style restaurant and hotel with history dating to 1852. Located "in the heart of historic downtown Batesville, a convenient midway meeting point between Indianapolis and Cincinnati, The Sherman is a well-loved locale for the people of the town and an important Indiana landmark." It is about 3 miles (4.8 km) off Interstate 74.

It is one of Indiana's oldest buildings.

It was opened as The Brinkmann House in 1852, and originally was a two-story frame building with clapboard siding. Its owner renamed it in 1865 to Sherman House in recognition of General William T. Sherman and the 83rd Indiana Volunteer Infantry, which fought under him in the American Civil War.

It was bought by Hillenbrand Industries in 1923, which added four buildings to the property and unified them into one structure by 1933. The work preserved "most of the original timber frame of yellow poplar girders, 30 inches by 90 feet, which were in perfect condition after 80 years. They are still in place." In 2015 the hotel was said to be closing and was put up for sale.

In the 1990s, a raspberry festival was held there every July.

After over 160 years of operation, the Sherman House closed on January 12, 2015, according to its website and local media reports.

The building, under new management, was remodeled, and had been reopened and renamed The Sherman as of February 2017.

It opened a Biergarten in 2019.

It was listed by the National Trust for Historic Preservation as a member of the Historic Hotels of America. In 2022, it is no longer a member.
