= Connecticut Route 37 =

North-south state highway in Connecticut, US

Route 37
- Map of western Connecticut with Route 37 highlighted in red

Route information
- Maintained by CTDOT
- Length: 18.66 mi (30.03 km)
- Existed: 1932–present

Major junctions
- South end: I-84 / US 6 / US 7 / US 202 / Route 39 / Route 53 in Danbury
- I-84 / US 6 / US 7 / US 202 in Danbury; Route 39 in New Fairfield and Sherman
- North end: US 7 in New Milford

Location
- Country: United States
- State: Connecticut
- Counties: Fairfield, Litchfield

Highway system
- Connecticut State Highway System; Interstate; US; State; SSR; SR; Scenic
← Route 35	→ Route 39

Route 37 is a north–south state highway in Connecticut running 18.66 miles (30.03 km) from Interstate 84 (I-84) in Danbury north to U.S. Route 7 (US 7) in New Milford. The northernmost section between the town centers of Sherman and New Milford was once part of an early toll road known as the New Milford and Sherman Turnpike chartered in 1818.

== Route description ==
Route 37 begins at an intersection with Route 39 and Route 53 in downtown Danbury, where one can also access I-84 (exit 6). It heads northeast as North Street, crossing under I-84 at exit 7 with access to the eastbound direction only. North of I-84, the road continues as Padanaram Road for about 1.3 miles (2.1 km) then shifts to Pembroke Road. Route 37 crosses into the town of New Fairfield after another 2.1 miles (3.4 km), as it skirts the banks of the Margerie Lake Reservoir. Route 37 intersects with Route 39 for a second time in New Fairfield center, where the road name changes to Sherman-New Fairfield Road. Route 37 continues through the northwest section of New Fairfield. Along the way it intersects with Patterson Road, an unsigned state highway known as State Road 850, which connects to Putnam County Road 68 in New York state. Route 37 then enters the town of Sherman as Greenwoods Hill Road and passes through the Pootatuck State Forest. About 4.5 miles (7.2 km) north of the town line, Route 37 meets Route 39 for the third time in Sherman center. After overlapping Route 39 for about 0.4 miles (0.64 km), the two routes split, with Route 37 heading east (as Barnes Hill Road) and Route 39 heading north. Route 37 crosses into the town of New Milford after another 1.4 miles (2.3 km). Route 37 ends at U.S. Route 7 in New Milford at the banks of the Housatonic River about 1.6 miles (2.6 km) later.

== History ==
The road from New Milford to Sherman to the state line in Pawling, New York was established as a turnpike in 1818, called the New Milford and Sherman Turnpike. It used Housatonic Avenue and Boardman Road in New Milford center, crossing the Housatonic River on the Boardman Bridge. West of the river it used modern Route 37 to reach Sherman center. West of Sherman center, it used Briggs Hill Road to the state line.

The old turnpike (west of the Housatonic River) later became a state highway and given the designation Highway 131 in the early 1920s. At the same time, the Danbury-New Fairfield-Sherman route was designated as Highway 136. Modern Route 37 was created in the 1932 state highway renumbering from old highways 131 and 136 (except for the Briggs Hill Road segment).

== Junction list ==
County	Location	mi	km	Destinations	Notes
Fairfield	Danbury	0.00	0.00	I-84 / US 7 (US 6 / US 202) / Route 39 north / Route 53 south – Danbury, New Fairfield	Southern terminus; southern terminus of Route 39; northern terminus of Route 53; exit 5 on I-84
Fairfield	Danbury	0.54	0.87	I-84 east / US 7 north (US 6 east / US 202 east) – Waterbury, New Milford	Exit 6 on I-84 west
Fairfield	New Fairfield	5.09	8.19	Route 39 – Brewster, NY, Squantz Pond State Park	
Fairfield	Sherman	15.19	24.45	Route 39 south – Squantz Pond State Park	South end of Route 39 overlap
Fairfield	Sherman	15.64	25.17	Route 39 north – Gaylordsville, Kent	North end of Route 39 overlap
Litchfield	New Milford	18.66	30.03	US 7 – New Milford, Danbury, Kent	Northern terminus
1.000 mi = 1.609 km; 1.000 km = 0.621 mi: Concurrency terminus
