= Connecticut Route 39 =

State highway in Fairfield County, Connecticut, US

Route 39
- Map of Fairfield County in southwestern Connecticut with Route 39 highlighted in red

Route information
- Maintained by CTDOT
- Length: 22.76 mi (36.63 km)
- Existed: 1932–present

Major junctions
- South end: I-84 / US 6 / US 7 / US 202 / Route 37 / Route 53 in Danbury
- North end: Route 55 in Sherman

Location
- Country: United States
- State: Connecticut
- Counties: Fairfield

Highway system
- Connecticut State Highway System; Interstate; US; State; SSR; SR; Scenic
← Route 37	→ Route 40

Route 39 is a north–south state highway in Connecticut. It is one of the main roads in downtown Danbury. Route 39 runs 22.76 miles (36.63 km) from Interstate 84 (I-84) in Danbury north to Route 55 in Sherman.

== Route description ==
Route 39 begins at an intersection with Routes 37 and 53 in Danbury and heads north, crossing I-84. It continues through New Fairfield and Sherman, intersecting Route 37 twice, including a brief concurrency in Sherman, before ending at an intersection with Route 55. It also has a spur to the New York state line (see below) which continues into New York as Putnam County Route 66.

== History ==
Route 39 was established as part of the 1932 state highway renumbering and originally connected Route 37 in New Fairfield and Route 55 in Sherman. The Danbury to New Fairfield portion (Clapboard Ridge Road to Warwick Road) was then known as Route 100. In 1934, Route 39 was extended west from New Fairfield center to the New York state line on the Danbury-New Fairfield town line. At the same time, Route 100 was renumbered to Route 37A. In 1963, Route 37A was deleted and was assigned as a southward extension of Route 39. The former section to the New York line was redesignated as State Road 839.

== Junction list ==
The entire route is in Fairfield County.

Location	mi	km	Destinations	Notes
Danbury	0.00	0.00	Route 37 north / Route 53 south – Danbury, Sherman	Southern terminus; southern terminus of Route 37; northern terminus of Route 53
Danbury	0.15	0.24	I-84 / US 7 (US 6 / US 202) – Waterbury, New Milford, Newburgh, Norwalk	Exit 5 on I-84
New Fairfield	9.14	14.71	Route 37 – Danbury, Sherman, Pawling	
Sherman	17.92	28.84	Route 37 south – New Fairfield, Brewster, NY	South end of Route 37 overlap
Sherman	18.37	29.56	Route 37 north – New Milford	North end of Route 37 overlap
Sherman	22.76	36.63	Route 55 – Gaylordsville, Kent, Wingdale, NY	Northern terminus
1.000 mi = 1.609 km; 1.000 km = 0.621 mi: Concurrency terminus
