= Sherman, Connecticut =

Town in Connecticut, United States

- Town
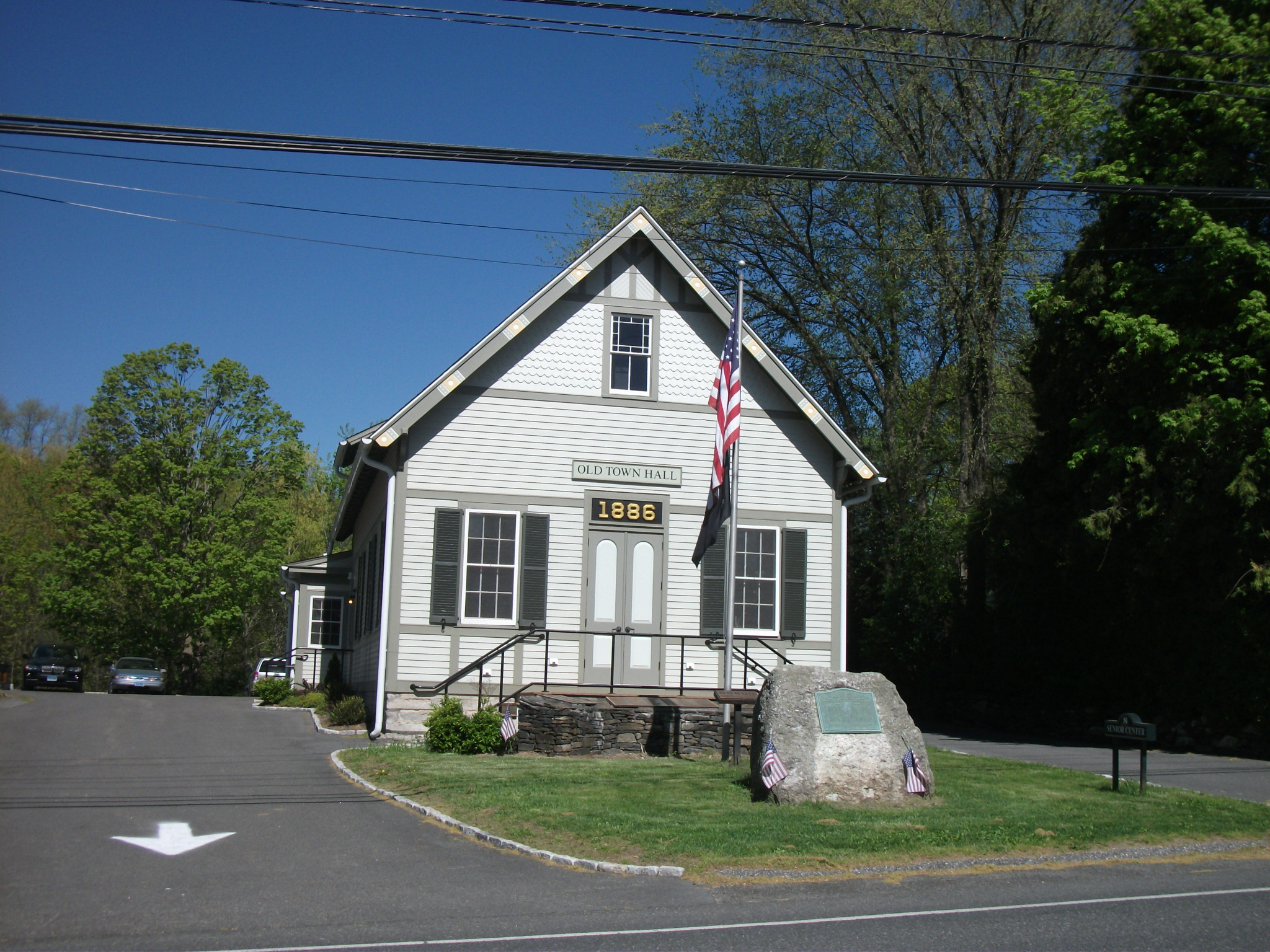
- 1886 Town Hall

- Seal

- Coordinates: 41°35′N 73°30′W
- Country: United States
- U.S. state: Connecticut
- County: Fairfield
- Region: Western CT
- Incorporated: 1802

Government
  - Type: Selectman-town meeting
  - First selectman: Don Lowe (D)
  - Selectman: Joel Bruzinski (D)
  - Selectman: Bob Ostrosky (R)

Area
  - Total: 23.4 sq mi (60.6 km^{2})
  - Land: 21.8 sq mi (56.5 km^{2})
  - Water: 1.5 sq mi (4.0 km^{2})
- Elevation: 466 ft (142 m)

Population (2020)
  - Total: 3,527
  - Density: 162/sq mi (62.4/km^{2})
- Time zone: UTC-5 (Eastern)
  - Summer (DST): UTC-4 (Eastern)
- ZIP Code: 06784
- Area codes: 860/959
- FIPS code: 09-68310
- GNIS feature ID: 0213505
- Website: www.shermanct.gov

Sherman is the northernmost and least populous town of Fairfield County, Connecticut, United States. The population was 3,527 at the 2020 census. Before 1802, the town was incorporated as part of New Fairfield. It is part of the Western Connecticut Planning Region. Sherman is a popular weekend retreat for New York City residents, with about a third of its residents weekenders. The town is located 62 miles (100 km) northeast of New York City, making it part of the New York metropolitan area.

Sherman is the only town in Fairfield County in the 860 area code; the remainder of the county is served by the area code 203/area code 475 overlay. The town is named for Founding Father Roger Sherman.

== History ==
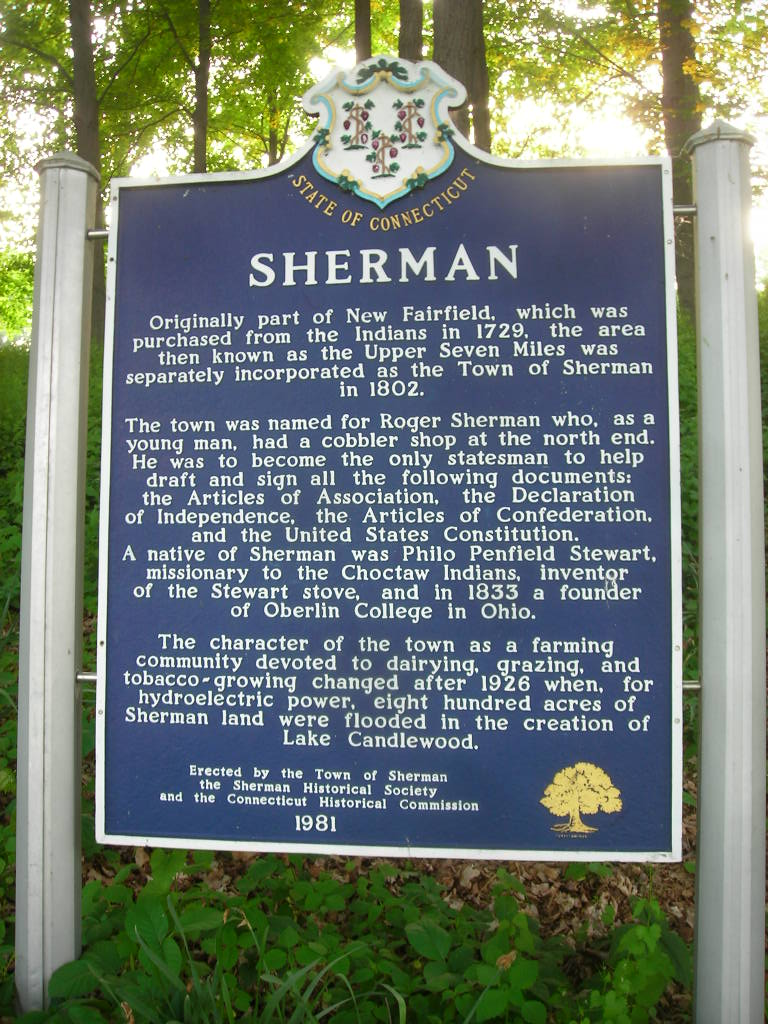
Historical marker in Sherman

The land which is now called Sherman was formerly occupied primarily by native people of Algonquian lineage.

In 1724, colonial settlers from Fairfield, Connecticut, received approval from the General Assembly of the Colony of Connecticut to establish a new township. According to one account, they negotiated with Chief Squantz of the Schaghticoke tribe. Alternatively, it is told that they did not negotiate with Chief Squantz because he moved to the north end of Squantz Pond land area and refused to "sell" the township of New Fairfield. They returned in the spring of 1725, but found that Chief Squantz had died during the winter. His four sons and heirs refused to sign the deeds. It was not until four years later that the white men called "The Proprietors" finally got the drawn marks of several other native people who may not have had authority to sell the land. They "purchased" a 31,000-acre tract of land that is now New Fairfield and Sherman, for 65 pounds sterling, the equivalent of about 300 dollars, on April 24, 1729. The deed was recorded on May 9, 1729, and is now deposited in the archives of the State Capitol in Hartford, Connecticut.

Sherman was formed in 1802 from the northern part of New Fairfield. Originally called the "Upper Seven Miles", it was named for Roger Sherman, the only person who signed all four founding documents of the United States of America. He also had a cobbler's shop in the north end of town which has been reconstructed behind the Northrup House in the center of town.

Sherman has one area on the National Register of Historic Places: the Sherman Historic District, bounded roughly by the intersection of Old Greenswood Road and Route 37, northeast past the intersection of Route 37 East and Route 39 North and Sawmill Road. The district was added to the National Register on August 31, 1991.

== Education ==
There is one public school in Sherman, the Sherman School. Its enrollment is about 325 students from pre-school to grade 8. There is no high school in Sherman; students instead are given a choice of five high schools that Sherman will pay for them to attend (New Milford High School, New Fairfield High School, Henry Abbott Tech, Shepaug Valley High School, and Nonnewaug High School).

== Communities ==
=== Sherman Center ===
The central census-designated place of Sherman is listed as the Sherman Historic District in the National Register of Historic Places. It was designated in 1991 for its historic architecture including several houses, the town hall, school, and manufacturing facilities.

=== Lakeside Woods ===
Lakeside Woods is a census-designated place in the southern part of Sherman, on the western shore of Candlewood Lake and bordered to the north by the main village.

== Geography ==
According to the United States Census Bureau, the town has a total area of 23.4 square miles (61 km^{2}), of which 21.8 square miles (56 km^{2}) is land and 1.6 square miles (4.1 km^{2}), or 6.68%, is water. Sherman is bordered by New Fairfield to the south, New Milford to the east, Kent to the north, and by Pawling, New York to the west.

There are several lakes within the limits of the town, the major ones being Candlewood Lake and Squantz Pond. Other large bodies of water include Lake Mauweehoo, Timber Lake, Valley Lake, Deer Pond, Spring Lake, Pepper Pond, Green Pond, Haviland Mill Pond, Quaker Pond North and Quaker Pond South.

The Appalachian Trail passes through the northern end of Sherman.

=== Naromiyocknowhusunkatankshunk Brook ===
Sherman is the location of Naromiyocknowhusunkatankshunk Brook (29 letters), in the north end of town near the New Milford border. The name of indigenous origin means "water flowing from the hills". The Naromi Land Trust in Sherman derived its name from the brook.

In some deeds it is called Deep Brook. For some time the brook was officially known at the state level as Morrissey Brook, but an official name change was put into Public Act 01–194, "An Act Concerning Certain Real Property Transactions," which was approved July 11, 2001. The 29-letter name was noted in an 1882 book, History of the Towns of New Milford and Bridgewater, 1703–1882, by Samuel Orcutt. The state department of transportation has also created a customized road sign for the longer name.

== Demographics ==
Historical population
Census	Pop.	Note	%±
1810	949		—
1820	957		0.8%
1830	947		−1.0%
1840	938		−1.0%
1850	984		4.9%
1860	911		−7.4%
1870	846		−7.1%
1880	828		−2.1%
1890	668		−19.3%
1900	658		−1.5%
1910	569		−13.5%
1920	533		−6.3%
1930	391		−26.6%
1940	477		22.0%
1950	549		15.1%
1960	825		50.3%
1970	1,459		76.8%
1980	2,281		56.3%
1990	2,809		23.1%
2000	3,827		36.2%
2010	3,581		−6.4%
2020	3,527		−1.5%
U.S. Decennial Census

As of the census of 2010, the population was 3,581 people, including 3,469 white, 35 Asian, 15 black, 1 Native American, 16 other, and 45 of two or more races. 76 of these people identified as Hispanic or Latino.

The income per capita is $55,920, which includes all adults and children. The median household income is $118,750.

There were 1,388 households, 460 of which contained children under 18.

Spring view of Sherman end of Candlewood Lake with Candlewood Mountain

== Government ==
Presidential elections results

Sherman town vote by party in presidential elections
Year	Democratic	Republican	Third Parties
2024	53.75% 1,212	44.70% 1,008	1.55% 35
2020	52.83% 1,234	46.06% 1,076	1.11% 26
2016	45.67% 976	49.84% 1,065	4.49% 96
2012	48.66% 1,020	50.05% 1,049	1.29% 27
2008	51.29% 1,110	47.41% 1,026	1.29% 28
2004	45.34% 958	53.05% 1,121	1.61% 34
2000	43.52% 809	50.35% 936	6.13% 114
1996	42.57% 696	43.43% 710	14.01% 229
1992	34.37% 610	39.77% 706	25.86% 459
1988	36.62% 538	61.81% 908	1.57% 23
1984	31.47% 421	68.01% 910	0.52% 7
1980	26.98% 340	57.62% 726	15.40% 194
1976	38.67% 401	60.56% 628	0.77% 8
1972	33.63% 299	64.90% 577	1.46% 13
1968	33.08% 221	62.43% 417	4.49% 30
1964	56.55% 311	43.45% 239	0.00% 0
1960	29.37% 136	70.63% 327	0.00% 0
1956	19.54% 77	80.46% 317	0.00% 0

Sherman tends to lean Republican in presidential elections. Lyndon B. Johnson won the town by 13 points in his presidential victory in 1964. In 2008, Barack Obama managed to edge John McCain by just under four points.

== In popular culture ==
Sherman is the location where a presidential candidate becomes possessed by the Devil (and/or sells his soul) in the novel "The Hell Candidate" by Graham Masterton (writing under the name "Thomas Luke") (Pocket Books 1980; currently out-of-print).

Another Graham Masterton novel, "Spirit" (Dorchester Publishing Co. 2001, copyright 1995), is a ghost story set in Sherman in the 1940s and 1950s.

== Notable people ==
- Mikhail Baryshnikov (born 1948), lived in Sherman for a time with his family
- Blackleach Burritt (1744–1794), clergyman in the American Revolution
- Martha Clarke (born 1944), American director and choreographer
- Vinnie Colaiuta (born 1956), drummer, owned a home in town for a short time
- Malcolm Cowley (1898–1989), 20th century literary critic, lived in a converted barn for many years
- Eleanor Fitzgerald (1877–1955), anarchist editor and theatre professional, lived in Sherman for many years
- Jerry Foley, TV director and producer has a home in Sherman, where he lives with his wife Ann-Marie and son Quinn
- Arshile Gorky (1904–1948), abstract expressionist painter, lived in Sherman on Spring Lake Road. He is buried in North Cemetery in town
- Daryl Hall (born 1946), musician lives in Sherman
- Bob Iger (born 1951), CEO of Disney, has a home in Sherman
- Durward Kirby (1911–2000), co-star of Candid Camera and Garry Moore Show had a home on Lake Mauweehoo in Sherman from 1951 to 2001
- Howard Schatz (born 1940), American photographer and ophthalmologist
- Jeffrey Toobin (born 1960), American lawyer, author and legal analyst for CNN
- Diane von Furstenberg (born 1946), fashion designer has a house in the area
- Scott Wise and his wife, Elizabeth Parkinson, choreographers and dancers, live in Sherman
- George Wunder (1912–1987), artist for 26 years on Terry and the Pirates
