= Haunted History =

- Genre: Paranormal; Documentary
- Written by: Jim Lindsay; Scott Paddor
- Directed by: Jim Lindsay; Scott Paddor; Richard Ross
- Narrated by: John Glover; Michael Dorn (special only)
- Composers: 615 Music Productions; Chris Stone & Jeljko Marasovich
- Countries of origin: United Kingdom; United States
- No. of seasons: 1 (UK), 2 (US)
- No. of episodes: 8 (UK), 24 (US)

Production
- Executive producers: Craig Haffner; Donna E. Lusitana
- Producers: Greg Goldman; Jim Lindsay; Jonathan Moser; Richard Ross
- Editors: Michael W. Andrews; Rod Decker; Bradley Holmes; Jonathan Moser; Steve Pomerantz
- Camera setup: Multiple-camera
- Running time: 45 minutes
- Production company: Greystone Communications Inc.

Original release
- Network: History Channel; Biography Channel
- Release: 26 October 1998 – 11 August 2001

Haunted History is a 1998 UFA/Cafe Productions series exploring the supernatural. Executive Producer Ed Babbage for Cafe (London). The American version of the show also debuted in 1998 (as a special) with the same premise of exploring the world to investigate the "haunted history" of reportedly haunted locations.

== Premise ==
Tell ghost stories related to famous people and events using a mixture of experts and dramatic reconstructions of both the supernatural events and the history underlying them.

== Season One (UK) ==
- Episode 1: Legacy of the Battle of Little Bighorn examines the ghost stories associated with Custer's Last Stand.
- Episode 2: Echoes of an Earthly Hell: Perched on a craggy peninsula on the south coast of Tasmania are the ruins of the infamous Port Arthur Penal Settlement. Do psychic echoes reverberate here?
- Episode 3: Ghosts of Slavery The Myrtles is a two-hundred-year-old Louisiana plantation house with a turbulent past. A ghost story from America's South.
- Episode 4: The Witches Who Cannot Forget: The story of Matthew Hopkins, Witchfinder General and the Witch Trials, and the ghosts which are still said to linger.
- Episode 5: Verdun: The Secret Battle Underground: claims of ghosts haunting tourists in the tunnels of the fortifications of this terrible First World War battle.
- Episode 6: Mary Queen of Scots: The Tragic Queen: retells the tale of the tragic Queen and the many ghost stories today associated with her romantic life.

== US version ==
Haunted History premiered as a special in October 1998. The series began on 26 October 1999 on the History Channel and ran until 11 August 2001. It was produced by Greystone Communications. The show featured haunted locations where ghosts have been reported from all over the United States, the United Kingdom and the Caribbean. It was executive produced by Craig Haffner and Donna E. Lusitana, and produced by Greg Goldman, Jim Lindsey, and Jonathan Moser, among others.

Opening: "Stories of the supernatural: fact or fiction? Through a veil of sightings and encounters, we catch a glimpse of our historical past on our journey through Haunted History."

== Series overview ==
Season	Episodes	Season premiere	Season finale
1	15	26 October 1999	23 December 2000
2	10	16 February 2001	11 August 2001

== Haunted History Special ==
Sp. #	Special Title	Original Airdate
1	Haunted History: Charleston	October 1998
Locations	Old Exchange Building, Charleston, South Carolina; Peronneau House, Charleston, South Carolina; Old Charleston Jail, Charleston, South Carolina; St. Philip's Church, Charleston, South Carolina; Old Slave Mart Museum, Charleston, South Carolina; 1837 Bed & Breakfast, Charleston, South Carolina; Charleston City Hall, Charleston, South Carolina; "History of the Civil War in Charleston" – Fort Sumter, Charleston, South Carolina; The Battery Carriage House Inn, Charleston, South Carolina	
Overview	Summary: A love-struck poet killed in a pistol duel; a murderess in an abandoned jail; a headless torso of a Confederate soldier from the Civil War; and a "Gentleman Ghost", all call this historic city their home.	

== Haunted History episodes ==
=== Season 1 (1999–2000) ===
Ep. #	Episode Title	Original Airdate
1	Haunted History: New York	26 October 1999
Locations	Merchant's House Museum, Manhattan, New York City; USS The Sullivans, Buffalo and Erie County Naval & Military Park, Buffalo, New York; Beardslee Castle, Little Falls, New York; Billop House (Conference House), Tottenville, Staten Island, New York; "The Legend of Lavender" – Tuxedo High School, Ramapo Cemetery, Hudson Valley, Ramapo, New York	
Overview	Summary: In the series premiere tales of ghosts in a Greenwich Village brownstone, on board a World War II ship, a Mohawk Valley castle, and a Revolutionary War house on Staten Island. Also featuring "The Lavender Story" about a mysterious lady in a lavender dress as retold by folklorist Chuck Stead.	
2	Haunted History: San Antonio	27 October 1999
Locations	The Alamo, San Antonio, Texas; Menger Hotel, San Antonio, Texas; Victoria's Black Swan Inn, San Antonio, Texas; Alamo Street Theatre (a.k.a. Alamo Methodist Church), San Antonio, Texas; Briscoe Western Art Museum (formerly the Hertzberg Circus Museum), San Antonio, Texas; Institute of Texan Cultures, San Antonio, Texas	
Overview	Summary: Alamo heroes return home; a hotel's beautiful murder victim; an actress's ghost; a museum of circus memorabilia; and a haunted hearse coach.	
3	Haunted History: Haunted Ships	28 October 1999
Locations	The Great Eastern, London, England; The Star of India, San Diego, California; The Cape of Good Hope/The Flying Dutchman, Cape Town, South Africa; The Charles Haskell, Salem, Massachusetts; Miller's Wharf, Salem, Massachusetts; Palpatine Light/Block Island, Rhode Island	
Overview	Summary: Prowling the world's oceans, haunted ships are harbingers of doom.	
4	Haunted History: Washington, D.C.	29 October 1999
Locations	The White House, Washington, D.C.; The Willard Hotel, Washington, D.C.; Dolly Madison House, Washington, D.C.; Decatur House Museum, Washington, D.C.; The Octagon House Museum, Washington, D.C.; Halcyon House, Washington, D.C.; The Legend of the Female Stranger, Alexandria, Virginia	
Overview	Summary: Known for skeletons in the closet, the U.S. Capital may claim equal notoriety for its political ghosts.	
5	Haunted History: Ghosts of Gettysburg	30 October 1999
Locations	Old Dorm (aka Pennsylvania Hall) at Gettysburg College, Gettysburg, Pennsylvania; Stevens Hall at Gettysburg College, Gettysburg, Pennsylvania; Cashtown Inn, Gettysburg, Pennsylvania; Gettysburg National Park, Gettysburg, Pennsylvania; Civil War House, Gettysburg, Pennsylvania; Devil's Den, Gettysburg, Pennsylvania; (private residence), Gettysburg, Pennsylvania	
Overview	Summary: Gettysburg, Pennsylvania has been called the most haunted battlefield in America and its ghost soldiers are still fighting a never ending battle in the Civil War.	
6	Savannah	10 May 2000
Locations	Colonial Park Cemetery, Savannah, Georgia; Pirates' House, Savannah, Georgia; The Olde Pink House, Savannah, Georgia; Bonaventure Cemetery Savannah, Georgia/(architectural history of Antebellum houses); Old Fort Jackson, Savannah, Georgia; Marshall House, Savannah, Georgia; Juliette Gordon Low House, Savannah, Georgia; Hamilton-Turner Inn (a.k.a. Charles Addams House), Savannah, Georgia; Hampton Lillibridge House, Savannah, Georgia; Mercer House, Savannah, Georgia	
Overview	Summary: Savannah is considered to be one of the, if not the most haunted town in the U.S. Historical hauntings; Civil War spirits; and ghostly encounters revealed in "Midnight in the Garden of Good and Evil".	
7	Haunted History: Haunted Tombstone	12 August 2000
Locations	Crystal Palace Bar, Tombstone, Arizona; Buford House Bed & Breakfast, Tombstone, Arizona; San Jose House, Tombstone, Arizona; O.K. Corral, Tombstone, Arizona; Aztec House, Tombstone, Arizona; Bird Cage Theatre, Tombstone, Arizona	
Overview	Summary: The dusty streets of Tombstone, Arizona gave birth to wild west legends of cowboys, lawmen, and outlaws. Believers say the ghosts of the Earp brothers, Doc Holliday, and the Clanton gang still roam the dusty streets of Tombstone, Arizona.	
8	Haunted History: Hollywood	26 August 2000
Locations	Roosevelt Hotel, Hollywood; Hollywood Forever Cemetery, Hollywood; Knickerbocker Hotel, Hollywood; Raleigh Studios, Hollywood, Los Angeles, California; The Georgian Hotel, Santa Monica, California	
Overview	Summary: Haunted movie studios, spooky hotels, and creepy cemeteries all make up the Hollywood the backlot tours don't want visitors to see.	
9	Haunted History: Key West	21 October 2000
Locations	La Concha Hotel, Key West, Florida; Fort Zachary Taylor, Key West, Florida; Story of Elena Hoyos and the Mad Doctor, (former) Lopez Funeral Home, Key West, Florida; Key West Cemetery, Key West, Florida; Audubon House, Key West, Florida	
Overview	Summary: In Key West, Florida, one way discover Ernest Hemingway's ghost, Civil War soldiers, restless spirits, and the ghost of a young woman whose lover stole her corpse.	
10	Haunted Edinburgh	11 April 2000
Locations	Holyrood Palace, Edinburgh, Scotland; Edinburgh Castle, Edinburgh, Scotland; Greyfriars Kirk Cemetery, Edinburgh, Scotland; West Bow Street, Edinburgh, Scotland; Rosslyn Chapel, Roslin, Midlothian, Scotland; Mary King's Close, Edinburgh, Scotland; Dalhousie Castle, Cockpen, Midlothian, Scotland	
Overview	Summary: Edinburgh, Scotland is steeped in murder, mystery, and mayhem.	
11	Nevada	25 November 2000
Locations	Flamingo Hotel, Las Vegas, Nevada; Luxor Hotel, Las Vegas, Nevada; Hoover Dam, Clark County, Nevada; Boulder Dam Hotel, Boulder City, Nevada; Pioneer Saloon, Goodsprings, Nevada; Old Washoe Club, Virginia City, Nevada; Needful Things Gift Shop (former funeral parlor), Virginia City, Nevada; Silver Queen Hotel, Virginia City, Nevada; St. Mary's Art Center, Virginia City, Nevada; Virginia City Cemetery, Virginia City, Nevada	
Overview	Summary: Spirits of prospectors, gamblers, entertainers, and ladies of the night all haunt Las Vegas, Virginia City, Goodsprings, and the Hoover Dam in Nevada.	
12	Philadelphia	2 December 2000
Locations	Independence Hall, Philadelphia, Pennsylvania; Franklin Institute, Philadelphia, Pennsylvania; Betsy Ross House, Philadelphia, Pennsylvania; Fort Mifflin, (outskirts) Philadelphia, Pennsylvania; General Wayne Inn, Merion, Pennsylvania; Eastern State Penitentiary, Philadelphia, Pennsylvania; Crier in the Country Restaurant, Glen Mills, Pennsylvania; Baleroy Mansion, Chestnut Hill, Philadelphia, Pennsylvania	
Overview	Summary: A statue walks, Betsy Ross' ghost, Hessian soldiers dwell in the cellar of an inn.	
13	Haunted History: Haunted London	23 December 2000
Locations	TBA	
Overview	Summary: In London, England, a city with a violent past, many ghosts are said to roam the streets and the Tower of London.	
14	Haunted History: New Orleans	2 February 2001
Locations	House on Rue Royale, (a.k.a. LaLaurie house) New Orleans, Louisiana; Marie Laveau Grave, St. Louis Cemetery No. 1, New Orleans, Louisiana; Myrtles Plantation, St. Francisville, Louisiana; The Delta Queen, Mississippi River, New Orleans, Louisiana; Le Petit Theatre, New Orleans, Louisiana	
Overview	Summary: Mardi Gras spirits; a voodoo queen gravesite; ghosts of poisoned children; and a phantom family.	
15	Haunted History: New England	9 February 2001
Locations	Daniel Benton Homestead, Tolland, Connecticut; Joshua Ward House, Salem, Massachusetts; House of the Seven Gables, Salem, Massachusetts; Nathaniel Hawthorne Birthplace (a.k.a. Hawthorne House), Salem, Massachusetts; John Stone's Inn, (a.k.a. Stone's Public House) Ashland, Massachusetts	
Overview	Summary: Salem witch trials; a heartbroken ghost; a murderous breakup; and a tortured witch.	

=== Season 2 (2001) ===
Ep. #	Episode Title	Original Airdate
1	Haunted History: Hawaii	16 February 2001
Locations	Volcanoes National Park, Big Island, Hawaii; Old Hawaiian Church, Hilo, Hawaii; "Night Marchers" – Waipio Tree House and Cottages, Waipio Valley, Big Island, Hawaii; Waimea Valley Park, (waterfall and lagoon) North Shore, Oahu, Hawaii; "Choking Ghosts" – Maikiki Fire Station, Honolulu, Hawaii; Pali Lookout and Pali Highway, Nu'uannu, Honolulu, Hawaii	
Overview	Summary: Hawaii is home to a volcano goddess Madame Pele, ghosts of violent native warriors, exorcism, and spirits that attack victims in the dead of night.	
2	Ghosts of Gettysburg II	24 February 2001
Locations	(private farmhouse), Gettysburg, Pennsylvania; Spangler's Spring, Gettysburg, Pennsylvania; Triangular Field, Gettysburg, Pennsylvania; Codori House and Farm at Gettysburg National Park, Gettysburg, Pennsylvania; Eisenhower House, Adams County, Pennsylvania; Hood House (private residence), Gettysburg, Pennsylvania; George-George House, Gettysburg, Pennsylvania; Lutheran Seminary at Gettysburg, Gettysburg, Pennsylvania	
Overview	Summary: "The Pickup Truck Ghosts": A woman using her pickup truck to shuttle extras to and from the battlefield sets from Gettysburg; "Buried Alive": an old barn on Seminary Ridge during the Battle of Gettysburg, becomes a burial place for a wounded Union soldier wrongly mistaken for dead.	
3	Haunted History: Northwest	2 March 2001
Locations	White Eagle Saloon, Albina, Portland, Oregon; Manresa Castle, Port Townsend, Washington; The Underground, Seattle, Washington; Vancouver Barracks, Vancouver, Washington; Heceta Head Lighthouse, Heceta House Bed & Breakfast, Yachats, Oregon	
Overview	Summary: A gold miners ghost is sealed under Seattle's streets; haunted hotel; restless Jesuit priest; young murder victim.	
4	Haunted History: Haunted Baltimore	9 March 2001
Locations	U.S.S. Constellation, Baltimore harbor, Maryland; Whistling Oyster Tavern, Fells Point, Baltimore, Maryland; Club Charles and Zodiac Restaurant, Baltimore, Maryland; Fort McHenry, Baltimore, Maryland; Edgar Allan Poe House Museum, Baltimore, Maryland; Westminster Hall and Burying Ground, Baltimore, Maryland; Fort Garrison, Stevenson, Maryland	
Overview	Summary: Haunted naval ship; Edgar Allan Poe's home; spirits of the roaring '20s mingle with modern revelers at Club Charles.	
5	Haunted History: Haunted Chicago	6 April 2001
Locations	Bachelor's Grove Cemetery, Midlothian, Illinois; 2122 North Clark Street (St. Valentine's Day Massacre Site), Lincoln Park, Chicago, Illinois; Museum of Science and Industry, Chicago, Illinois; Rosehill Cemetery, Chicago, Illinois; The Country House Restaurant, Clarendon Hills, Illinois; St. James at Sag Bridge, Lemont, Illinois	
Overview	Summary: Creepy cemetery; haunted restaurant; gangster ghosts; spirits from the St. Valentine's Day Massacre; Clarence Darrow's ghost.	
4	Haunted History: Atlanta	20 April 2001
Locations	1848 House Restaurant, Marietta, Georgia; Kennesaw House, Marietta, Georgia; Andersonville Prison, Andersonville, Georgia; Barnsley Gardens Resort, Adairsville, Georgia; Lockerly Arboretum Plantation (Rose Hill), Milledgeville, Georgia	
Overview	Summary: Civil War hospital; former plantations; old prison for Union soldiers.	
7	Haunted History: Haunted Maine	8 June 2001
Locations	Jonathan Buck Curse, Bucksport, Maine; Bangor Historical Society (a.k.a. Thomas A. Hill House), Bangor, Maine; Sarah Ware Murder, Bucksport, Maine; Seguin Lighthouse, Seguin Island, Kennebec River, Maine; Central Street and Mount Hope Cemetery, Bangor, Maine	
Overview	Summary: A witch on her lover's grave; the spirit of a murdered maid reaches out to a woman in dreams; a mad lighthouse keeper takes an ax to his wife and her piano.	
8	Haunted History: Haunted Houses	22 June 2001
Locations	Surratt Tavern, Clinton, Maryland; Old Washington Arsenal, Washington, D.C.; Winchester Mystery House, San Jose, California	
Overview	Summary:	
9	Haunted History: The Rockies	29 June 2001
Locations	Buckskin Joe (ghost town), Buckskin Joe, Colorado; Emma Crawford House, Manitou Springs, Colorado; Palace Hotel & Casino, Cripple Creek, Colorado; Molly Brown House Museum, Denver, Colorado; The Stanley Hotel, Estes Park, Colorado	
Overview	Summary: For some, the American west's only offerings were tragic death. The Rockies; haunted hotel; former town, Molly Brown's Denver mansion; Estes Park big haunt.	
10	Haunted History: The Caribbean	11 August 2001
Locations	Fort San Cristobal, San Juan, Puerto Rico; "Blue Harbour" (Noël Coward House) – Cabrita Island, Jamaica; Edinburgh Castle ruins, (Dr. Lewis Hutchinson castle), Jamaica; White Witch of Rose Hall, Montego Bay, Jamaica; Cholera plague of 1853 (beach), St. Thomas; 19th century private house, St. Thomas; Private home, Charlotte Amalie Harbor, St. Thomas; "One North" (Street House), St. Croix	
Overview	Summary: The Caribbean is known for its ghosts, zombies, pirate ships, and the Bermuda Triangle.	

== See also ==
- List of ghost films
