= Tolland Green Historic District =

Historic district in Connecticut, United States

- U.S. National Register of Historic Places
- U.S. Historic district
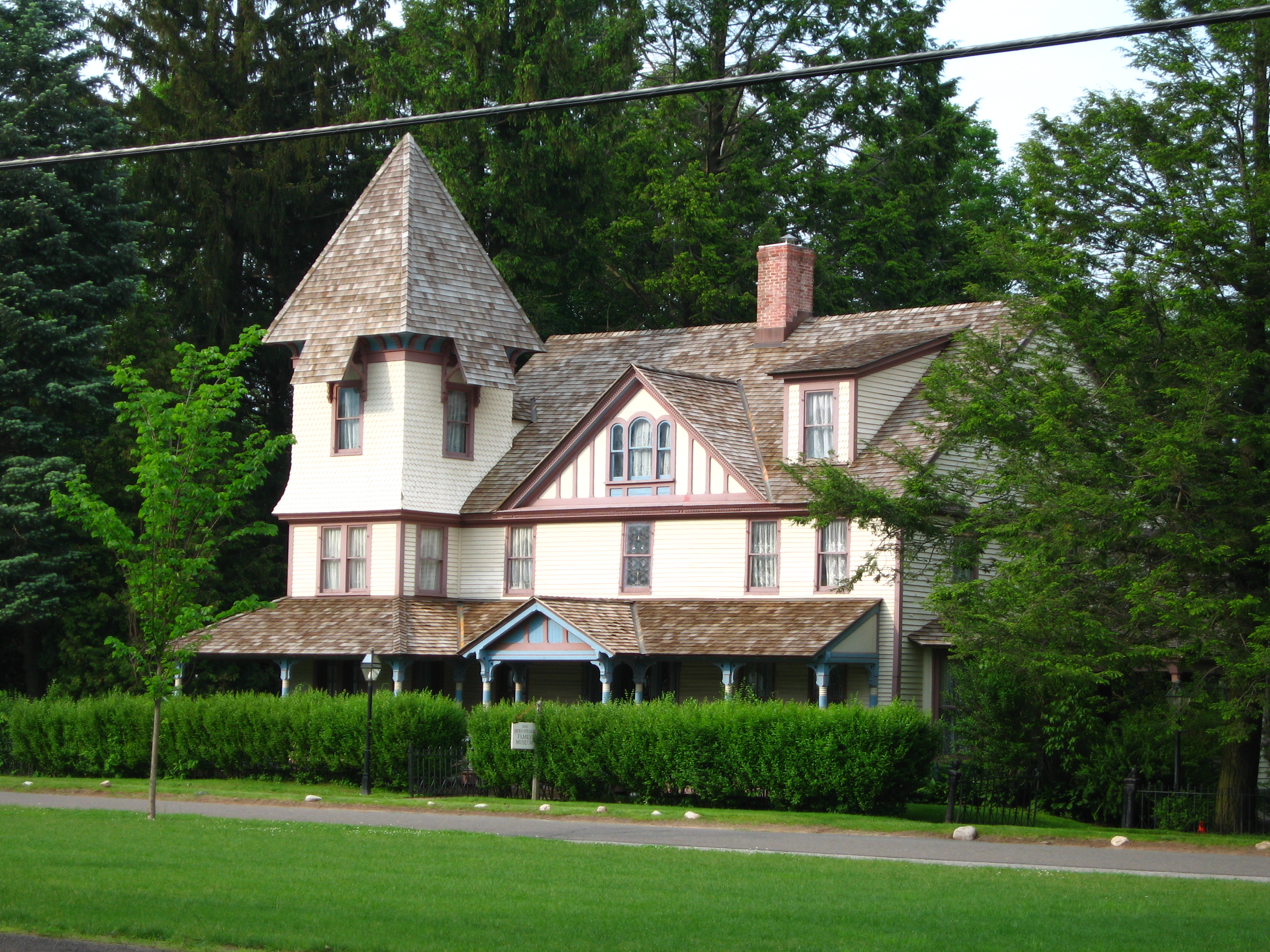
- The Hicks-Stearns Family Museum

- Location within Connecticut
- Location: Roughly along Old Post, Tolland Stage, and Cider Mill Roads, Tolland, Connecticut
- Coordinates: 41°52′11″N 72°22′36″W
- Architectural style: Late Victorian, Federal, Colonial
- NRHP reference No.: 97000832
- Added to NRHP: August 1, 1997

The Tolland Green Historic District is a historic district that includes the town green, Tolland Green, of Tolland, Connecticut.

The Tolland Green is a long and narrow strip of land oriented in a north-south direction. The district includes the green and the surrounding properties. The historic district contains 55 contributing buildings and one other site, and is located primarily along Merrow Road (Route 195) from just south of Cider Mill Road in the south, past the Tolland Green, then widening in the north to encompass both Tolland Stage Road (Route 74) and the street known as Tolland Green to roughly Dunn Hill Road. Route 195 serves as the Tolland Green's western boundary, while the street known as Tolland Green serves as the eastern boundary. Route 74 cuts through the Green from east to west.

On either side of the Green at the south end are two town halls, the Old Town Hall (1879) and the present Town Hall (1909). The historic Congregational Church, the Old Tolland County Courthouse (built in 1822; site of the Tolland Public Library from 1899 to 1985), the Board of Education building (in a converted residence built in 1830), the Ratcliffe Hicks Memorial School (built in 1908; now the Hicks Memorial Municipal Center and Library), and the Old Tolland County Jail and Museum are located near the intersection where the Route 74 cuts through the Green. Most buildings in the historic district are residential and most date from the 18th and 19th centuries. Historic residences include the Hicks-Stearns Family Museum, former home of Ratcliffe Hicks.

The district is significant for its landscape qualities, its historical associations, and its Federal and Victorian architecture.

== See also ==
- National Register of Historic Places listings in Tolland County, Connecticut
