= Daniel Benton Homestead =

Daniel Benton Homestead Museum
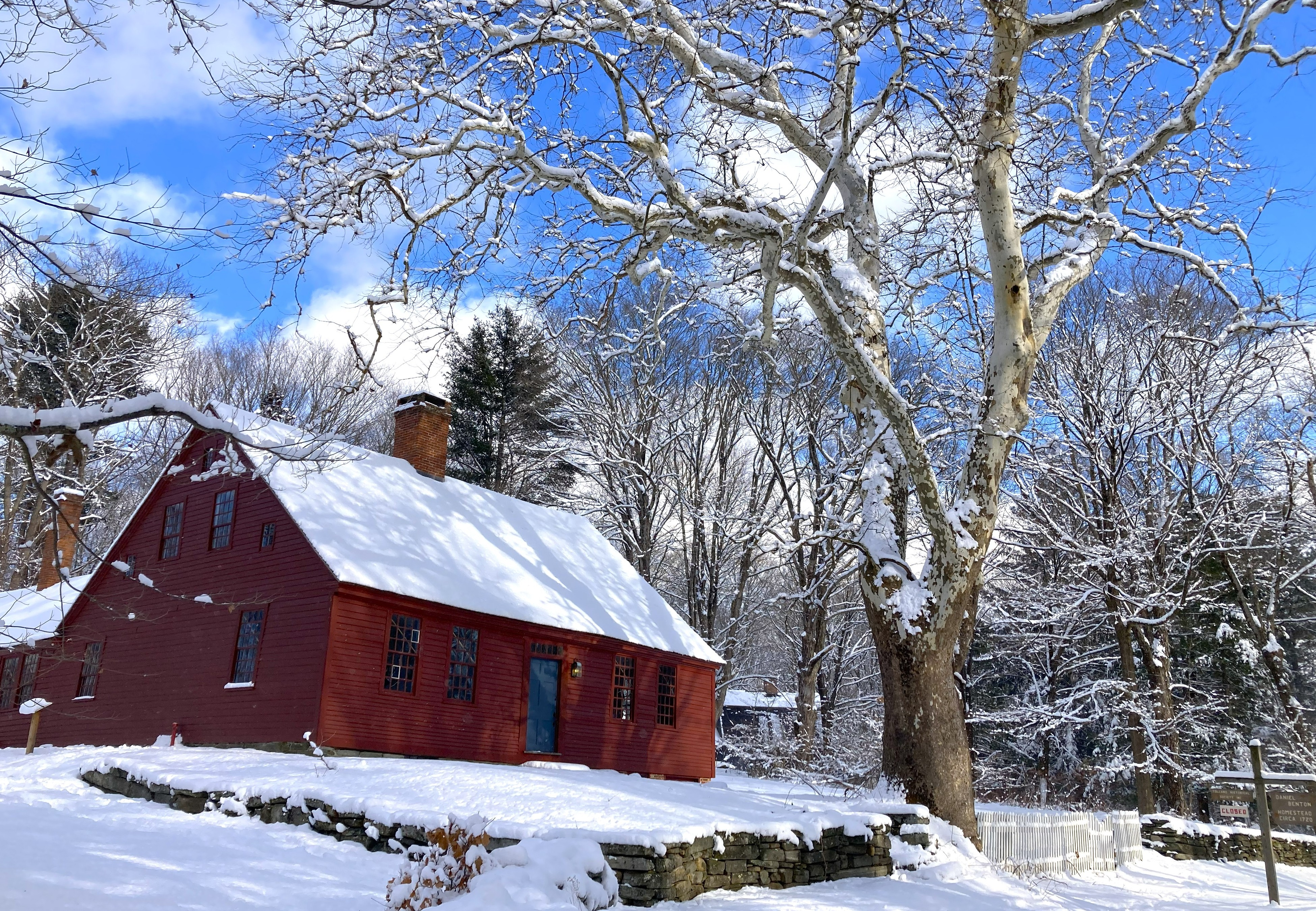
- Daniel Benton Homestead
- Established: 1970 (house built in 1720)
- Location: 154 Metcalf Road; Tolland, Connecticut 06084; United States
- Coordinates: 41.851863°N 72.377076°W
- Type: Historic house museum
- Director: Gail Usher
- Website: tollandhistorical.org/daniel-benton-homestead/

The Daniel Benton Homestead is a historic house museum and the oldest house in Tolland, Connecticut. It was built in 1720 and has been operated by the Tolland Historical Society as a museum since 1970.

Along with the Old Tolland County Jail and Museum, the Tolland County Courthouse, and the Hicks-Stearns Family Museum, the Benton Homestead is one of Tolland's four major historic landmarks.

== House ==
The house is a colonial Cape Cod with an ell, featuring ten rooms, five fireplaces, and a spacious cellar. The building has been restored and repainted in its original colors. The original paneling in the parlor was painted with simulated walnut wood grain in a style typical of early Georgian architecture.

== History ==
Daniel Benton, son of Samuel Benton, one of the first settlers in Tolland, built the family homestead on 40 acres of farmland in 1720. The house stayed in the Benton family for six generations. It was the ancestral home of U.S. Senator William Benton.

=== American Revolution ===
During the American Revolutionary War, twenty Hessian soldiers were imprisoned in the Benton Homestead's cellar, whose rafters featured intricate scrolls, now undecipherable, carved by Hessians to pass the time during captivity. The prisoners were well-treated and several chose to remain in Tolland after their release.

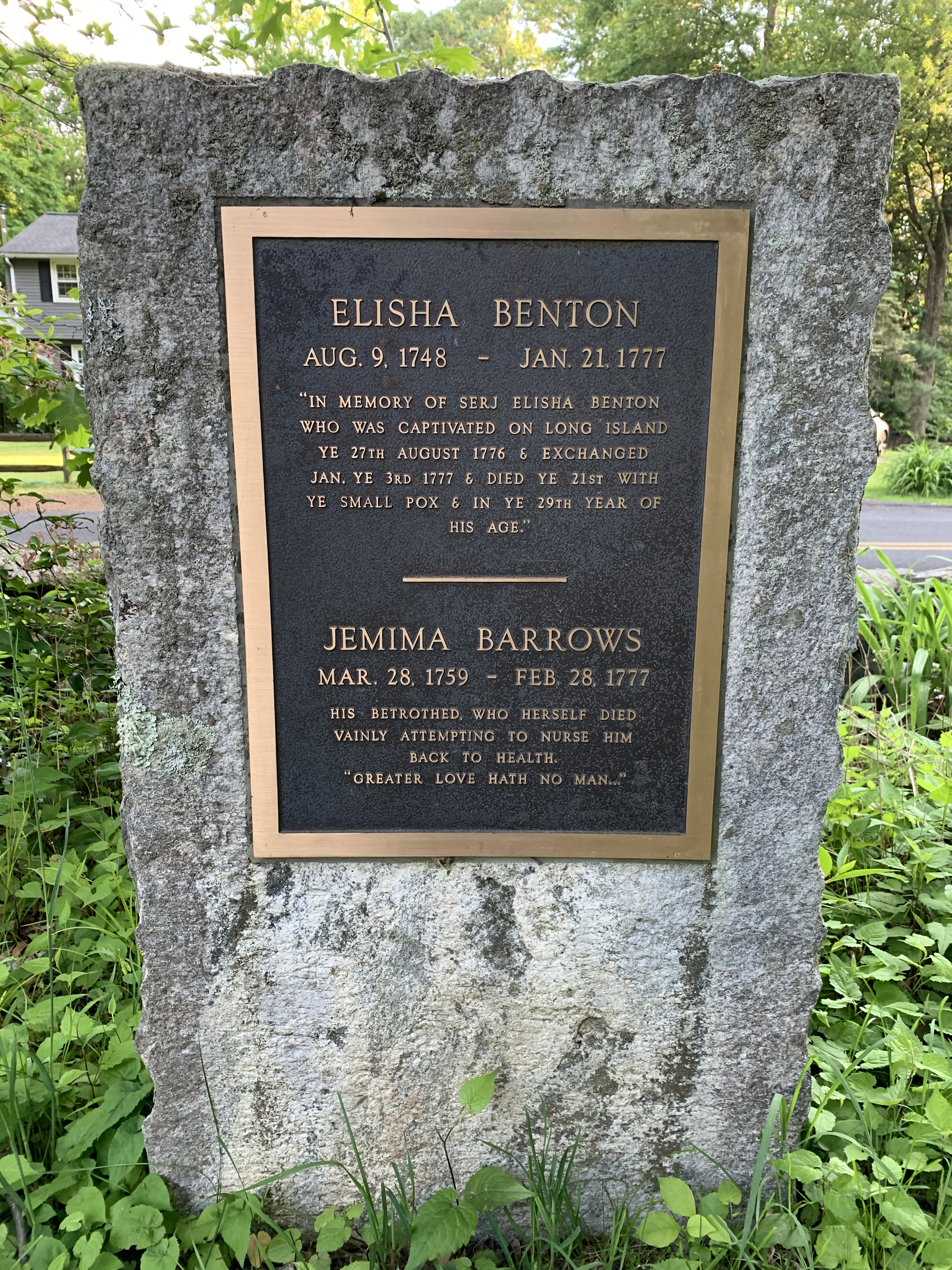
Historic marker for Elisha Benton and Jemima Barrows at the Benton Homestead

The homestead was also the scene of a tragic romance. Daniel Benton's grandson, Elisha Benton (b. 1748), fell in love with Jemima Barrows (b. 1759), 11 years his junior and the daughter of a local cabinetmaker. Both families frowned on the romance because of age and social class differences. Elisha and two of his brothers enlisted in the Continental Army and were captured in the Battle of Long Island and held for months on squalorous British prison ships. Elisha's brothers died in captivity.

Released in a prisoner exchange, Elisha Benton returned home suffering from smallpox in January 1777. Jemima attempted to nurse Elisha back to health, but he died on January 21. Jemima, too, died of smallpox on February 28. As custom prohibited the burying of an unmarried couple side by side, the lovers were buried a discreet distance apart on Benton land.

=== Twentieth century ===
In 1934, the Chapin family, which was descended from the Bentons, sold the house to WTIC radio host and University of Connecticut dietetics instructor Florrie Bishop Bowering. Bowering restored the house and lived there until she sold it in 1968 to William Shocket and Charles Goodstein. The new owners donated the property, house, and furnishings to the Tolland Historical Society on December 13, 1969. The house opened as a museum the following year. It is open for tours on Sundays from June through September.

The house is reputedly haunted by the ghosts of Hessian soldiers, and of the lovers Elisha and Jemima. Bowering's maid reportedly saw the specter of a young woman in a bridal dress wandering through the house and weeping. Other visitors reported unexplained lights, sounds, and apparitions.

== Popular culture ==
The Benton Homestead was featured on Episode 20 of the popular history podcast Lore.
