= Country House =

Country House or The Country House may refer to:

- English country house, a large house or mansion in the English countryside
- Anglo-Irish big house, similar house in Ireland
- Country house (Spain), a type of a tourist accommodation
- Country House (horse), an American racehorse
- "Country House" (Blur song), 1995
- Country House (Sam Hunt song), 2025
- The Country House (play), 2014 play by Donald Margulies
- The Country House, a 1907 novel by John Galsworthy
- The Country House (restaurant), a restaurant in Clarendon Hills, Illinois
- Country house poem, a type of poem popular in 17th-century England

== See also ==
- Country Home (disambiguation)
