= Ratcliffe Hicks =

American businessman and philanthropist (1843–1906)

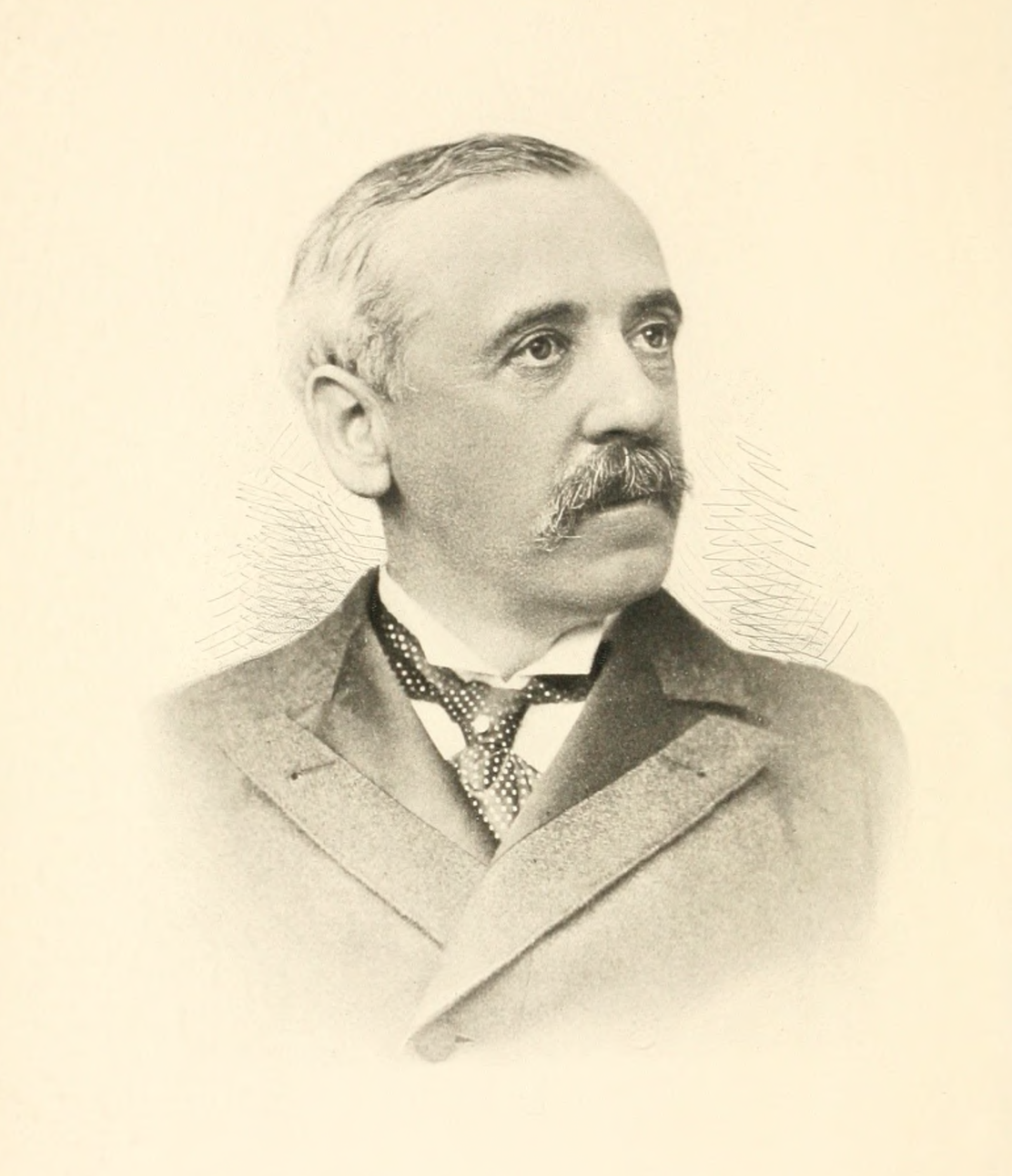
- Portrait drawing (c.1896)
- Born: October 3, 1843; Tolland, Connecticut, US
- Died: September 19, 1906 (aged 62); Interlaken, Switzerland
- Education: Brown University
- Occupations: Industrialist, State Legislator
- Known for: Public service in the Connecticut General Assembly Benefactor of the University of Connecticut and Tolland
- Political party: Democratic Party

Ratcliffe Hicks (1843–1906) was an American lawyer, industrialist, state legislator, and philanthropist from Tolland, Connecticut. The family home is now the Hicks-Stearns Family Museum. The Ratcliffe Hicks School of Agriculture at the University of Connecticut and the Hicks Memorial Municipal Center and Library in Tolland are named after him.

== Life ==
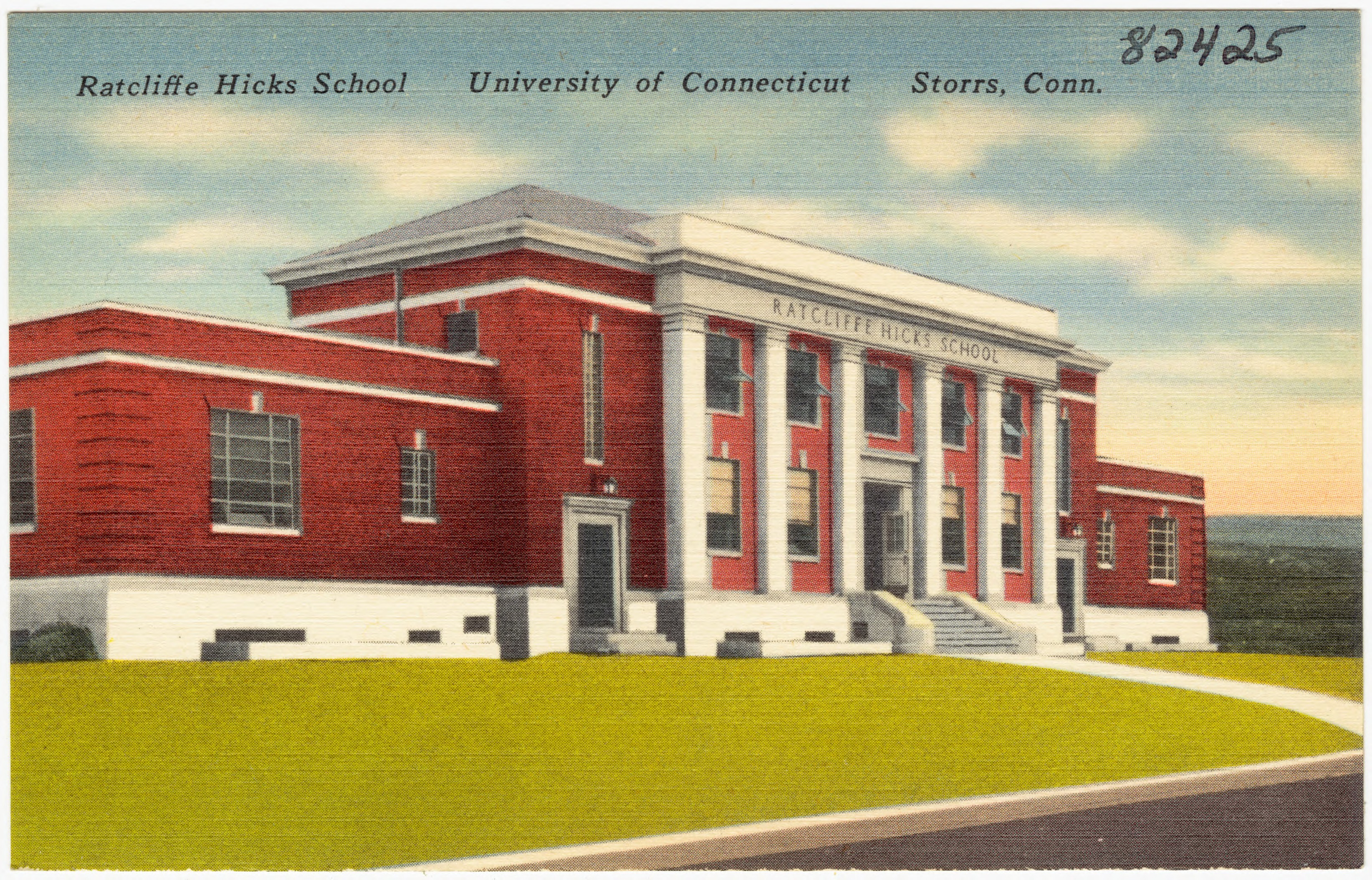
Postcard showing Ratcliffe Hicks School of Agriculture, University of Connecticut, Storrs, c.1945

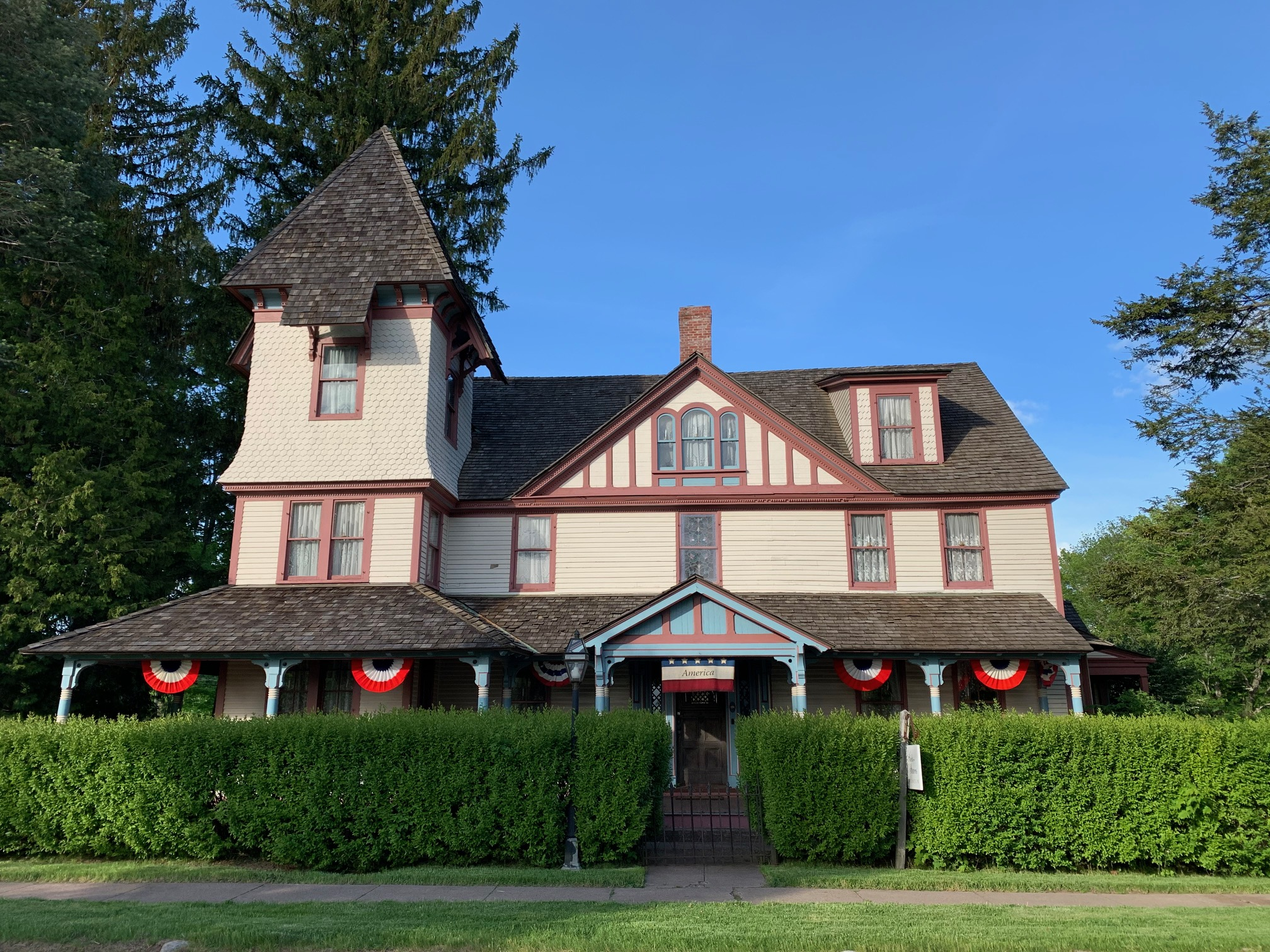
Hicks-Stearns Family Museum in Tolland, Connecticut

Born in Tolland on October 3, 1843, Ratcliffe was the eldest son of Charles R. Hicks (1812–1878), a prominent merchant from Providence, Rhode Island, and later New York City, and Maria A. Stearns (1815–1905). His grandfather on his mother's side was a judge and state legislator from Tolland. His grandfather on his father's side was a successful sea captain.

Ratcliffe attended the Monson Academy and the Williston Seminary preparatory schools and graduated with honors from Brown University in 1864. He was a founding member of the Delta Upsilon chapter at Brown. Returning to Tolland, he became a schoolteacher while studying law under local judge and politician Loren P. Waldo. After passing the bar, Hicks practiced law in Meriden and Hartford, including three years in the law offices of U.S. Senator Orville H. Platt. Hicks became a prominent attorney, litigating important cases and earning over $10,000 annually in legal fees, equivalent to $280,000 in 2020 dollars.

Hicks served in various public offices throughout his life. He served as City Attorney of Meriden (1869–1874) and Attorney for New Haven County (1873–1876). In 1866 he was elected to the Connecticut General Assembly, the youngest legislator at that time, and remained in office for twenty-nine years. He was a member of the Democratic Party. In 1891, Hicks chaired the House Committee on Women's suffrage and supported a bill granting women the right to vote in local school board elections. When passed, it became the first such law enacted in New England. He also spoke against capital punishment.

Hicks' father-in-law died in 1881, and Hicks became the executor of the Stearns estate. In 1882, Hicks withdrew from his law practice to become president of the Canfield Rubber Company of Bridgeport. By 1896 he had built the company into a manufacturing enterprise with $250,000 in capital (versus a mere $10,000 in 1882) and $1 million in annual sales. During this commercial period, Hicks made twenty voyages to Europe, chiefly to sell his rubber to overseas concerns.

Hicks married Elizabeth "Lizzie" Canfield Parker (1844–1889) on December 17, 1879. She was the widow of Wilbur Parker and daughter of Jared and Mary Canfield of Middletown, Connecticut. The Hickses had one daughter, Elizabeth, born February 19, 1884. Mrs. Hicks died in Paris on June 7, 1889. Ratcliffe remarried on October 19, 1895, to Isabella Wormer of Chicago. Isabella sued for divorce in September 1896 on the grounds of "intolerable cruelty." The divorce was granted along with alimony of $50,000 in cash in early 1897. Ratcliffe Hicks died of pleuropneumonia in Interlaken, Switzerland, in 1906.

== Philanthropy ==
During his lifetime, Hicks established annual prizes for public speaking at Brown University, Storrs Agricultural College (later the University of Connecticut), and Meriden High School. On his death in 1906, he left major bequests to area institutions. He was reportedly so incensed at Brown's misspelling of his given name on his diploma that he cut the university out of his will, with the exception of a student scholarship. He did bequeath $10,000 to Yale University to fund student scholarships.

Hicks' largest gift was in the form of a charitable trust (worth a quarter of his estate) to start a school of agriculture and forestry in Tolland County. Administered by the Meriden Trust & Safe Deposit Company, trust monies were to be invested for twenty-five years before building the school. In 1936 the estate established scholarships, grants, and loans for assistance to boys and young men pursuing education in agricultural subjects. The long-awaited school opened in 1941 as part of the University of Connecticut. The Ratcliffe Hicks School of Agriculture and the Ratcliffe Hicks Building & Arena are named after him.

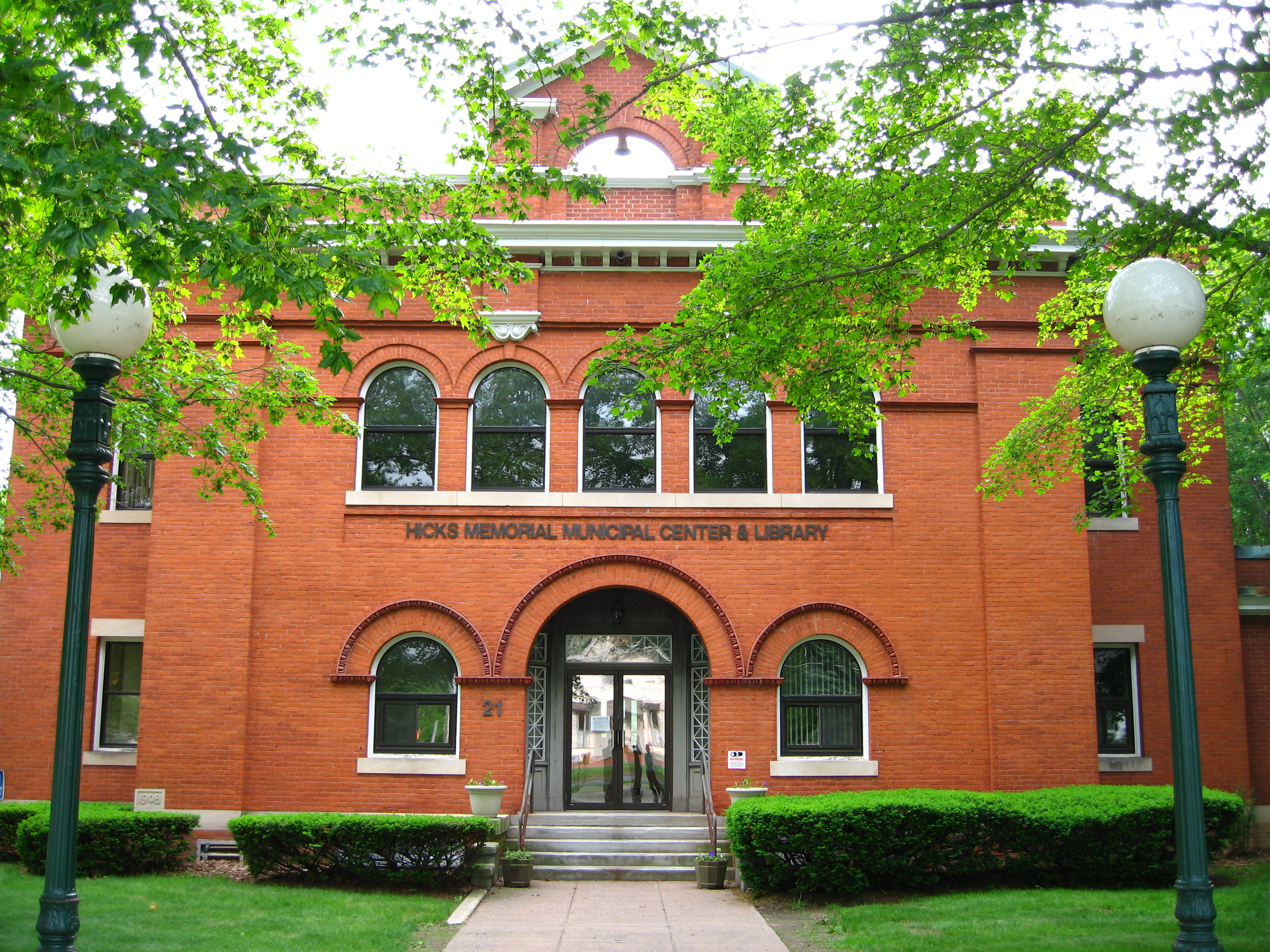
Hicks Memorial Municipal Center and Library in Tolland, CT

Hicks also left substantial bequests to the Town of Tolland. He left $10,000 to the Tolland Public Library and a similar sum to build the Ratcliffe Hicks Memorial School (now the Hicks Memorial Municipal Center and Library) in the Tolland Green Historic District. The school was built on the site of a former school where Hicks had studied until the age of 13. Built in 1908 for a cost of $13,000, the school comprises a two-story brick building with stone trimmings. Ratcliffe's sister, Minnie Helen Hicks, contributed additional monies. The opening ceremony was marked by speeches from the presidents of Brown University and Trinity College.

== Elizabeth Hicks ==
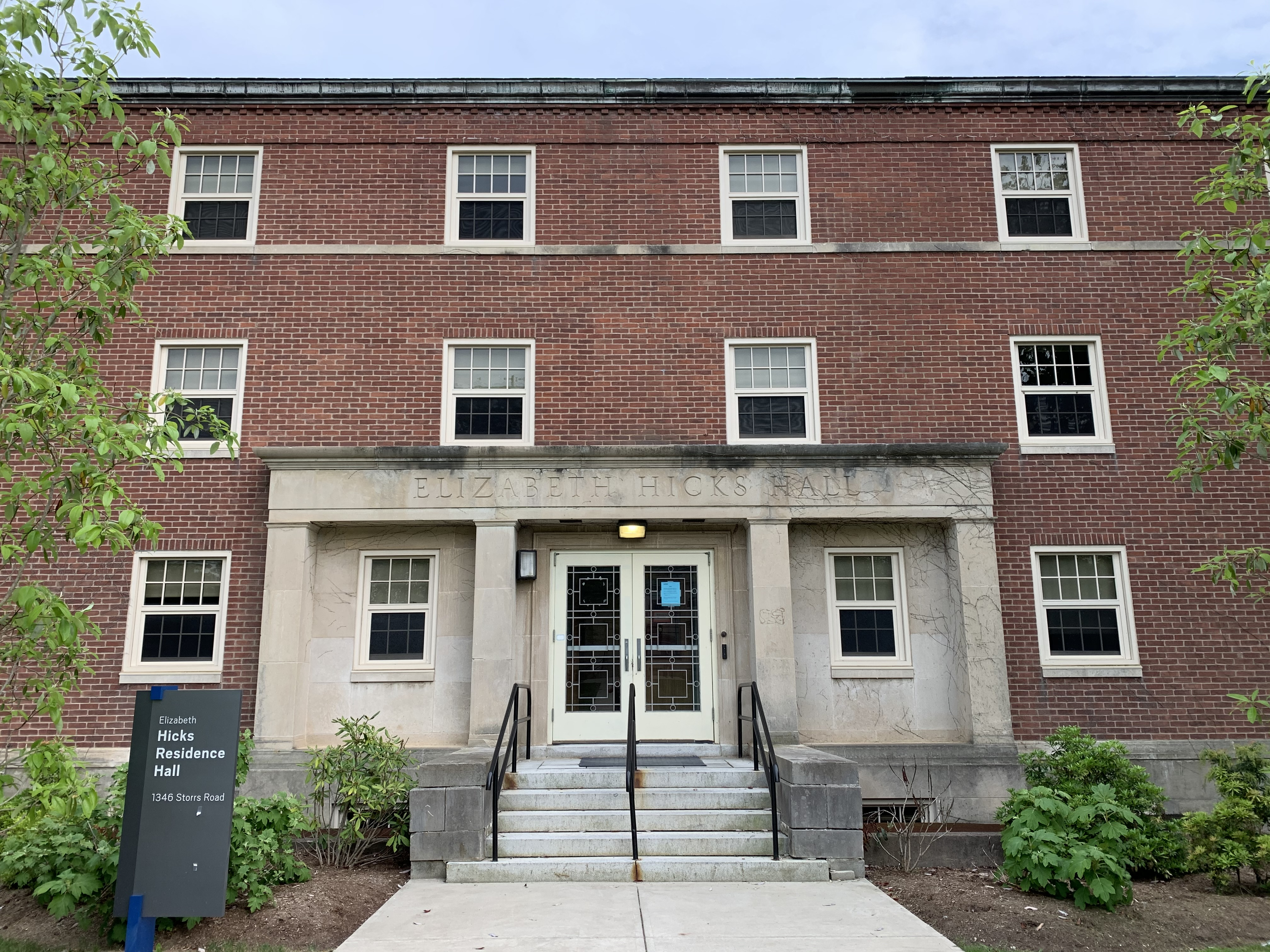
Elizabeth Hicks Residence Hall, University of Connecticut

The only child of Ratcliffe and Elizabeth "Lizzie" Canfield Hicks, Elizabeth Hicks (1884–1974) became a philanthropist in her own right. She continued to dwell in the family home on Tolland Green after her father's death in 1906. She worked very closely with the University of Connecticut to develop the Ratcliffe Hicks School of Agriculture. She spoke at the dedication ceremony for the school in 1950 and was known for hosting formal teas each spring with the students and campus leaders. Dedicated in 1951 and built with state funding support, the Elizabeth Hicks Residence Hall, a women's dormitory on the UConn campus, is named after her. She also served on many local boards and committees, including the school's and library's, but never ran for political office. She died in 1974 and is buried in Tolland's North Cemetery. Elizabeth bequeathed the Tolland family home to a charitable trust to convert into a museum, now the Hicks-Stearns Family Museum. The museum features Victorian-era family heirlooms and furnishings.
