= Tolland Public Library (Connecticut) =

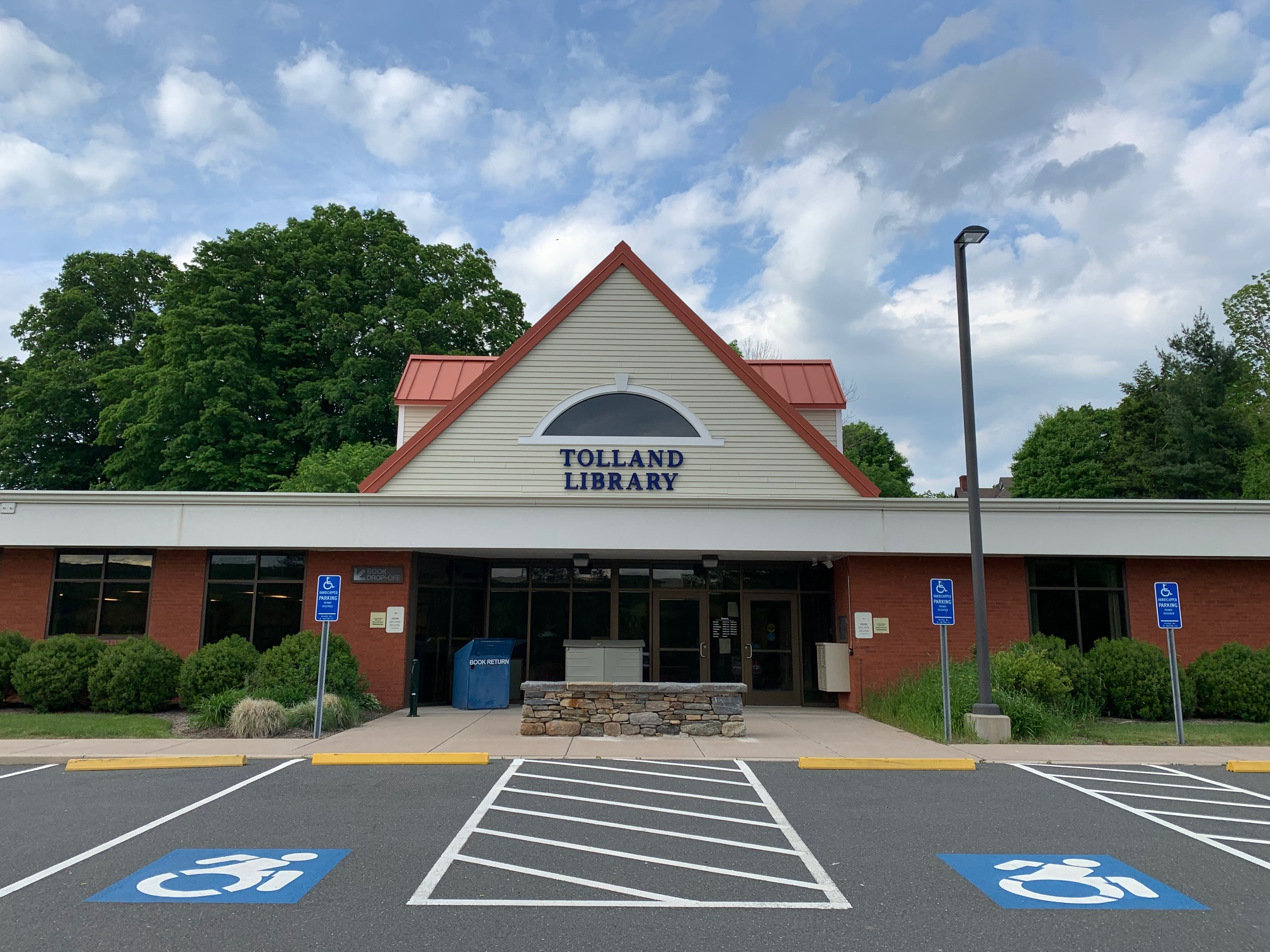
- 41°52′11.90″N 72°22′05.80″W
- Location: 21 Tolland Green; Tolland, Connecticut, United States
- Type: Public
- Established: 1899

Collection
- Size: 71,604 (2018)

Access and use
- Circulation: 99,179 (2018)
- Population served: 14,838 (2018)

Other information
- Director: Barbara Pettijohn
- Website: www.tolland.org/library

Tolland Public Library is a public library that serves the town of Tolland, Connecticut. The library was founded in 1899 under the auspices of the Tolland Public Library Association. It serves a population of 14,838 (as of 2017) by "providing library materials and services to support the leisure time, general information, and educational needs of its citizens."

== Services ==
Like most public libraries, the Tolland Public Library provides reading and audiovisual materials for borrowing, adult and children's programming, public computers with internet access, interlibrary loan, and reference services. Additionally, the library offers more specialized services such as a makerspace, a small business resource center, Oculus Rift virtual reality stations, and various electronic databases, including Ancestry.com. In 2019, the library reported 4905 individuals registered as cardholders, 99,179 items borrowed, 7207 reference questions asked, and 97,098 visits made to the building.

== Foundation ==
The Tolland Public Library Foundation provides funding to support library programming and collections. The largest portion of its funding consists of income from the Phoebe Dimock King and Elizabeth C. King Eaton Endowment, established in 2009 by the daughter of a former Tolland library employee. Funds support author talks and other educational programming, as well as digital access to Ancestry.com, Newsweek magazine, and other digital resources for library cardholders. Similarly, the Friends of the Tolland Public Library raise donations, host programs, and run a small booksale room inside the library.

== History ==
In 1898, the Tolland Public Library Association was formed for the purpose of starting a free library for residents of Tolland. Mrs. Hamilton R. Downing led the effort. In 1901, the Tolland Public Library Association was incorporated by a charter from the Connecticut General Assembly. Twenty-five local women were charter members. Two or three rooms in the Tolland County Courthouse were designated to house the library, furnishings were donated, and funds to purchase books were raised by subscription. The library opened to the public on January 1, 1899 with a collection of 400 books. The number of volumes in the library's collection rose to 5584 in 1948, 12,046 by 1970, 25,000 in 1985, and 71,604 in 2018. Early collections were developed largely through funding from a yearly state grant of $100. From 1898 until her retirement in 1948, Miss Lucille Agard, a lifelong resident of Tolland, served as town librarian.

In 1906, Tolland Library received a $10,000 bequest from prominent industrialist and state legislator Ratcliffe Hicks, who had died earlier that year in Interlaken, Switzerland. His daughter, Elizabeth Hicks, later served as an honorary vice president on the Tolland Public Library Association's board of directors. In 1974, Elizabeth willed the Hicks' family home in Tolland to a nonprofit trust, which converted the house into the Hicks-Stearns Family Museum.

In 1930, Mr. and Mrs. Samuel Simpson purchased the County Courthouse from Tolland County, as authorized under a special act of the state legislature. For one dollar, the Simpsons deeded the building to the library association. The building continued to house the probate courts for Tolland and neighboring Ellington until 1960.

In 1977, a town committee recommended construction of a new and modernized library. In 1983, the town voted to appropriate $1.3 million to renovate and expand the vacated Hicks Memorial School (built in 1908), just down the street from the Courthouse, for mixed use as the Hicks Municipal Center and Library. A state grant of $115,000 supported construction. The Town of Tolland Charter was revised in 1984 and established a library with a six-member advisory board appointed by the town council. Library staff were to report up to the town manager. On October 24, 1985, the library moved to its new and substantially larger location.

In November 2013, a referendum authorized the Town to appropriate $2.6 million for a library expansion, converting the small municipal gymnasium next door into a library space. Of the $2.6 million, $1 million came from a Connecticut State Library grant and another $500,000 came from a Connecticut Small Town Economic Assistance Program (STEAP) grant. The rest of the money was raised through bonding. The expanded library reopened on March 30, 2017. The library grew its footprint from 11,162 square feet to 16,062 square feet. The expanded facilities featured more seating and study spaces, a makerspace with a 3D printer, and an 84-seat program room.
