= Country Home =

Country Home may refer to:

- Country Home (magazine), American lifestyle magazine
- The Country Home, formerly Farm & Fireside, American lifestyle magazine
- Country house, house or mansion in the countryside

== See also ==
- Country House (disambiguation)
