= Hicks-Stearns Family Museum =

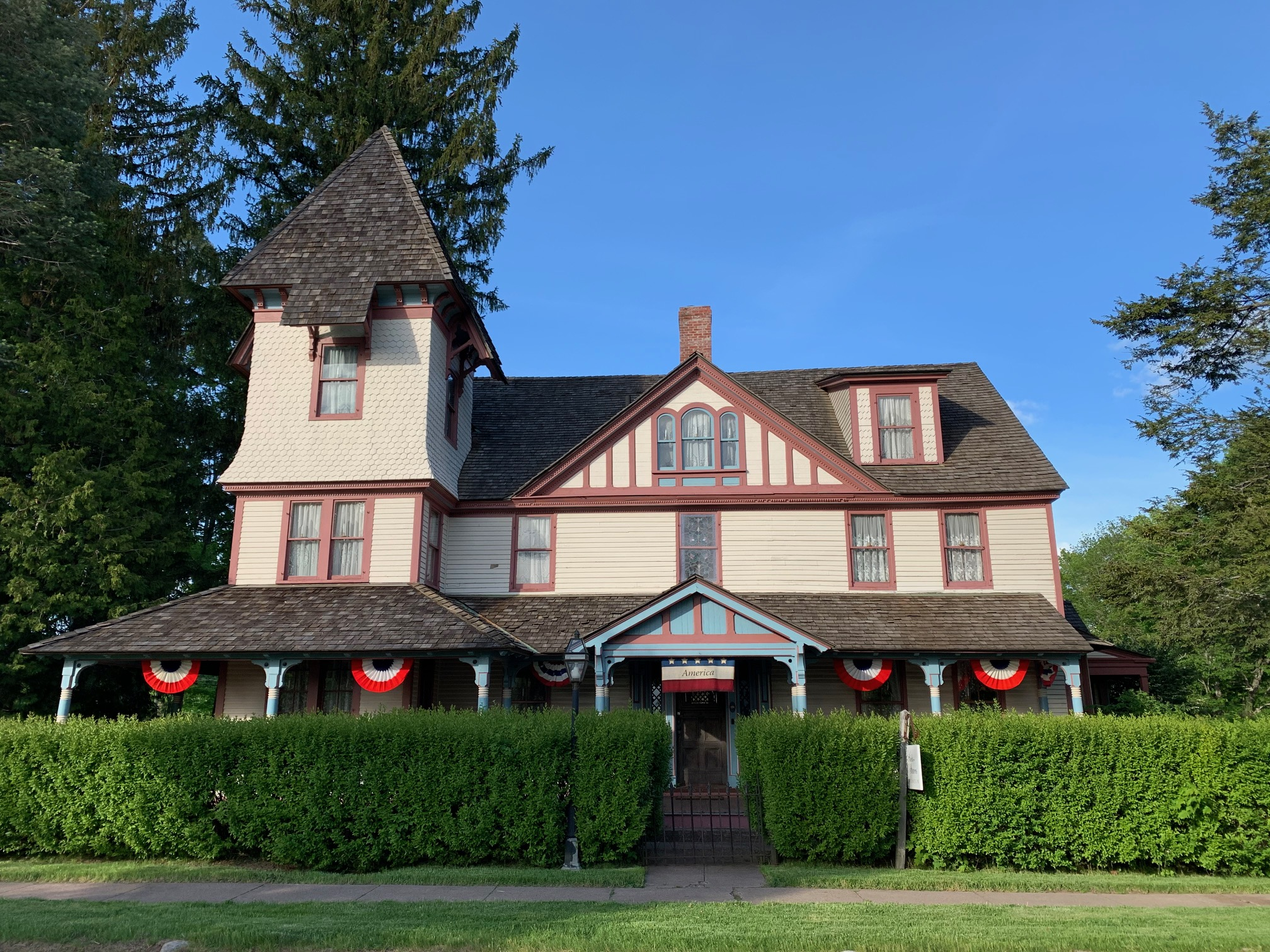

- Location within Connecticut
- Established: 1978 (house built in 1788)
- Location: 42 Tolland Green; Tolland, Connecticut 06084; USA
- Coordinates: 41.871419°N 72.368123°W
- Type: Historic house museum
- Collections: Family heirlooms
- Website: www.facebook.com/hicksstearns/

The Hicks-Stearns Family Museum is a Victorian historic house museum located on the town green in Tolland, Connecticut. The house was built in 1788, when it served as a tavern. It was occupied by the Hicks family from 1845 until 1970. Along with the Old Tolland County Jail and Museum, the Tolland County Courthouse, and the Daniel Benton Homestead, the Hicks-Stearns Family Museum is one of Tolland's four major landmarks.

== House ==
The Hicks-Stearns family house is a transition home, featuring a colonial-era kitchen and a Victorian-era parlor and furnishings. Collections include family heirlooms, cloth tea balls, Victrola, and faux bamboo furniture.

The house's original owner was Benoni Shepard, a Congregationalist deacon and Tolland's first postmaster.

The museum hosts tours, concerts, and holiday programs from May through December.

== Hicks family ==
The house's most prominent resident was Ratcliffe Hicks (1843-1906), eldest son of Charles Hicks, a successful merchant from Providence, Rhode Island, and Maria Stearns. Ratcliffe was a Brown University graduate (1864), successful lawyer and industrialist (president of the Canfield Rubber Works in Bridgeport), and Connecticut state legislator. Ratcliffe renovated and expanded the family house with many Victorian elements, adding a front porch and a distinctive three-story tower.

When Ratcliffe Hicks died in 1906, his will established a trust (worth a quarter of his estate) to start a school of agriculture and forestry in Connecticut. The school opened in 1941 as part of the University of Connecticut. UConn's Ratcliffe Hicks School of Agriculture and the Ratcliffe Hicks Building & Arena are named after him.

Dedicated in 1951, UConn's Elizabeth Hicks Residence Hall is a women's dormitory named after Ratcliffe's daughter, painter and philanthropist Elizabeth Hicks (1884-1974). Elizabeth willed the Tolland family home to a nonprofit trust to convert into a museum.
