= Tolland High School =

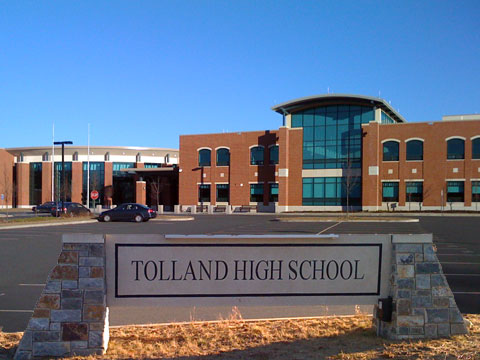

Location
- 1 Eagle Hill; Tolland, Tolland County, Connecticut 06084; United States
- Coordinates: 41°52′18″N 72°20′23″W

Information
- Type: Public School
- Motto: Strive for Excellence
- Established: 1969 (57 years ago)
- Locale: Rural, Fringe
- School district: Tolland School District
- CEEB code: 070792
- Principal: Thomas Poland
- Teaching staff: 56.50 (FTE)
- Grades: 9-12
- Enrollment: 700 (2023–2024)
- Student to teacher ratio: 12.39
- Campus type: Suburban
- Colors: Blue, white, red
- Team name: Eagles
- Rival: RHAM, Ellington Knights, E.O. Smith Panthers, Rockville Rams, East Catholic Eagles
- Newspaper: The Eagle's Eye
- Yearbook: Eyrie
- Website: www.ths.tolland.k12.ct.us

Tolland High School is a public high school in Tolland, Connecticut.

== Overview ==
In 1969, Tolland High School (THS) opened as the first all electric high school in Connecticut. In its first year, there were only three grades: 9th, 10th, and 11th.

In 2002, the Tolland Board of Education recommended the construction of a new building for THS. Voters approved the $56.6 million construction in June 2003 with a vote of 2,302 to 2,083. In 2006, THS moved to a new building on the same road. Improvements over the old building included a larger auditorium, new furniture, new sports fields, and a technology wing.

According to U.S. News & World Report, there are 828 enrolled as of April 2017, resulting in a student-teacher ratio of 14:1. Tolland High School has a graduation rate of 98%

== Tolland Alternative Learning Center (TALC) ==
The Tolland Alternative Learning Center (TALC) is an alternative education program at the Tolland High School that helps struggling students graduate high school, initiated in January 2004. The students take classes from 3pm-7pm.

== Athletics ==
=== CIAC State Championships ===
Team	Year
Boys Cross Country	1974, 1989, 1991, 1992, 2003, 2008, 2009, 2010, 2011, 2016, 2017, 2018, 2019
Girls Cross Country	2011, 2012, 2013, 2014, 2015, 2016, 2019
Girls Track and Field (Outdoor)	2007, 2009, 2012, 2013, 2015, 2016, 2017
Boys Track and Field (Outdoor)	1997, 2012, 2019, 2023
Girls Track and Field (Indoor)	2014, 2015, 2016, 2017
Girls Soccer	1983, 1984, 1985, 2018
Boys Golf	1977, 2006, 2007, 2024
Boys Track and Field (Indoor)	1997, 2020
Boys Soccer	2009, 2015, 2024
Baseball	1992
Girls Gymnastics Coop	2023
Boys Ice hockey Coop	2015

== Notable alumni ==
- Daniel C. Burbank, astronaut
- David Passaro, contractor for the Central Intelligence Agency
- Scott Roberson, CIA Officer and police detective killed in Camp Chapman attack
- Jennifer K. Sweeney, poet
- Barry Wood, architect, model, and star of TLC's Trading Spaces
