= Thomas A. Hill House =

Historic house in Maine, United States

- Grand Army Memorial Home
- U.S. National Register of Historic Places
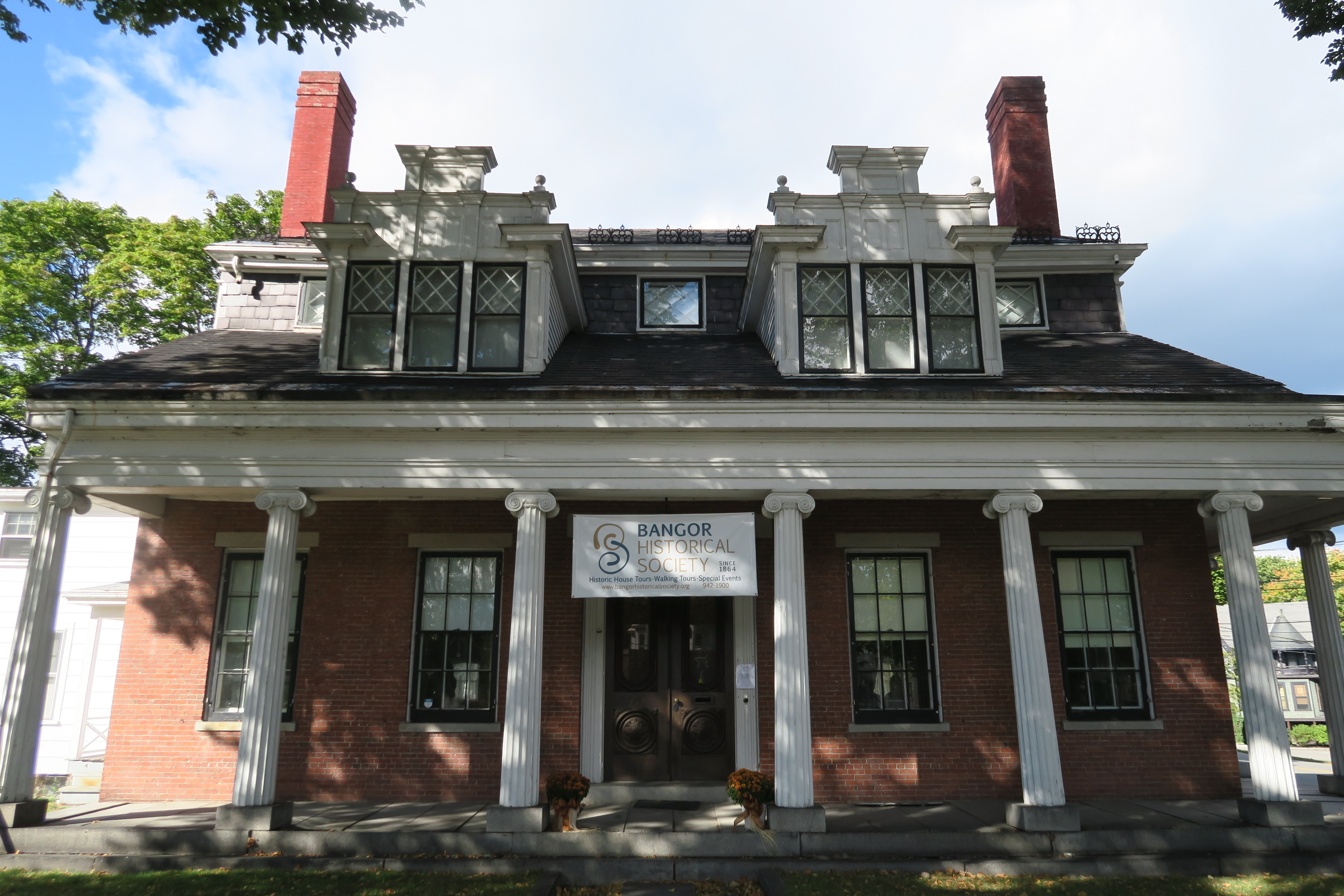
- Thomas A. Hill House

- Location within Maine Location within the United States
- Location: 159 Union St., Bangor, Maine
- Coordinates: 44°47′59″N 68°46′30″W
- Area: 0.5 acres (0.20 ha)
- Built: 1840
- Architect: Richard Upjohn
- Architectural style: Greek Revival
- NRHP reference No.: 72000105
- Added to NRHP: October 31, 1972

The Thomas A. Hill House, also formerly known as the Grand Army Memorial Home, is a historic house at 159 Union Street in Bangor, Maine. Now housing the collections of the Bangor Historical Society and an American Civil War collection, the house was built in 1836 to a design by Richard Upjohn. The house has been home to two of Bangor's mayors, and became a museum in 1944. It was listed on the National Register of Historic Places in 1972.

== Description and history ==
The Hill House is located just southwest of downtown Bangor, at the northwest corner of Union and High Streets. Standing across Union Street is the Isaac Farrar Mansion, like the Hill House a brick Greek Revival house designed by Richard Upjohn. The Hill House is a 2 1/2-story structure, with a side gable roof, four end chimneys, and a granite foundation. A single-story shed-roof porch extends across the two street-facing facades, supported by fluted Ionic columns on short granite bases. The second story is set in a monitor, with small square diamond-pane windows, and elaborate three-window dormers projecting from the roof below the monitor section. The interior's historic integrity has been partially compromised by the conversion of the property for use as a museum.

The house was commissioned from Richard Upjohn by Thomas A. Hill, a prominent local businessman, and was completed in 1836. Hill suffered financial reverses in the Panic of 1837, and was compelled to sell the property to Samuel and Matilda Dale. Dale, also a prominent businessman, served several terms as mayor of Bangor, entertaining President Ulysses S. Grant here in 1871. Other prominent residents include Bangor's first mayor, Allan Gilman, and Dr. James F. Cox, who held his medical practice here. The house was acquired in 1944 by the local chapter of the Sons of Union Veterans of the Civil War, who established it as the Grand Army of the Republic Home. In 1952 the Sons allowed the Bangor Historical Society to store its collection on the second floor, resulting in alterations that included removal of a circular staircase and changes in the decor. The historical society took ownership of the property in 1974.

== See also ==
- National Register of Historic Places listings in Penobscot County, Maine
