= Alamo Methodist Church =

Historic church in Texas, United States

- U.S. National Register of Historic Places
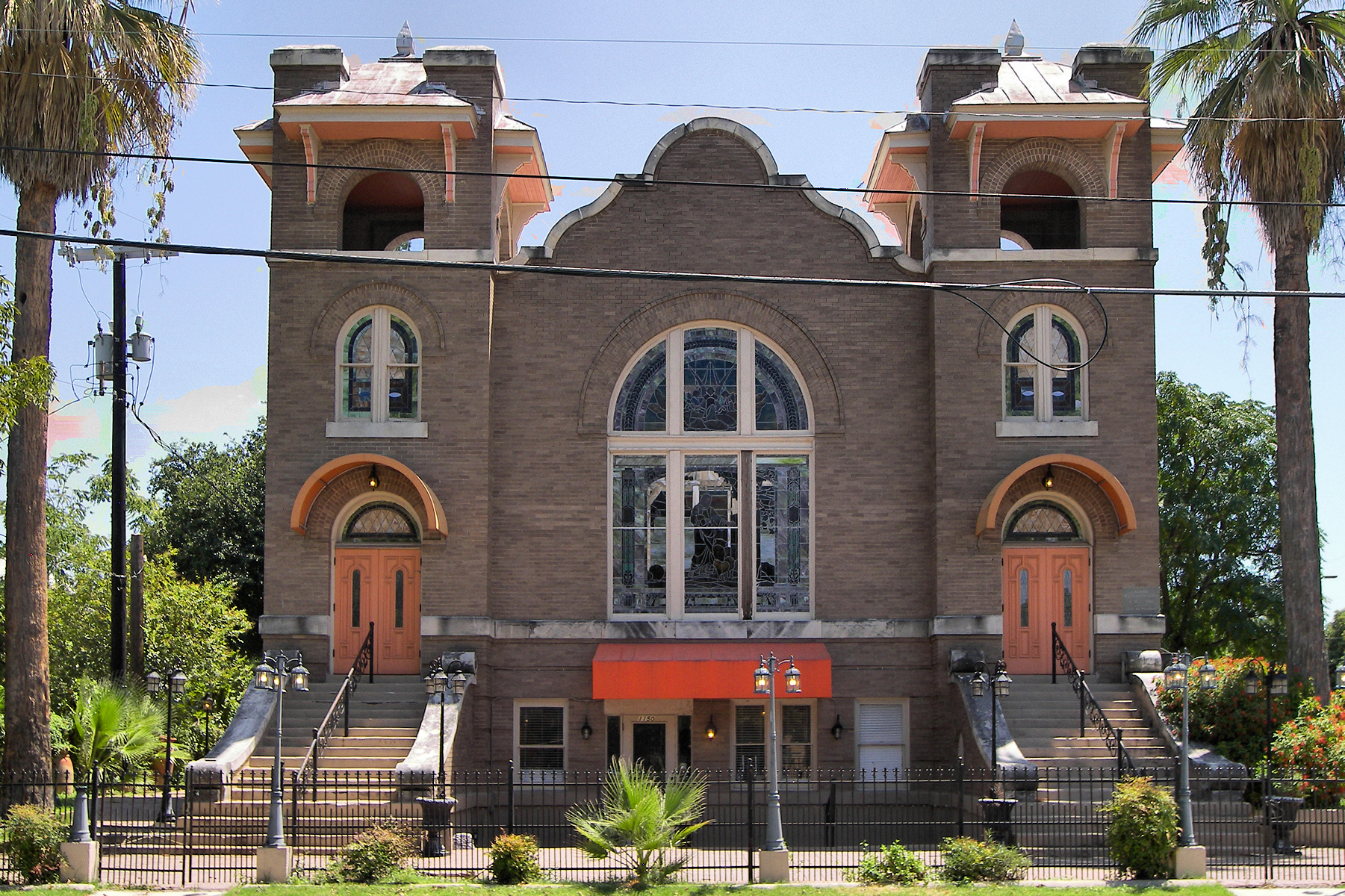

- Location within Texas Location within the United States
- Location: 1150 S. Alamo St., San Antonio, Texas
- Coordinates: 29°24′40″N 98°29′34″W
- Area: less than one acre
- Built: 1912
- Architect: Spillman, Beverly
- Architectural style: Mission/Spanish Revival
- NRHP reference No.: 79003446
- Added to NRHP: June 11, 1979

Alamo Methodist Church is a historic Methodist church building at 1150 S. Alamo Street in San Antonio, Texas.

It was built in 1912 in a Mission/Spanish Revival style. The building was added to the National Register of Historic Places in 1979.
