= Silver Queen Hotel =

Historic hotel in Virginia City, Nevada

General information
- Address: 28 North C Street, Virginia City, NV 89440
- Coordinates: 39°18′40″N 119°38′58″W
- Opened: 1876; 149 years ago
- Owner: Connie Carlson

Website
- www.silverqueenhotel.net

Silver Queen Hotel is a hotel located in the center of Virginia city in Nevada. It has 28 restored rooms that dates back from the 19th century. Silver Queen Hotel was built in 1876 and it is the oldest hotel in Virginia city.

Silver Queen Hotel is also known for the painting Silver Queen. It is a 15 feet tall full-body portrait of a woman that was embedded with 3,261 morgan silver dollars, as attributed to the depth of the deepest mine in Virginia city. The Silver Queen's belt was made of 28 $20 gold coins while her bracelet and necklace were made of silver quarters. The painting depicts Jerry Eaton, whose husband, Carroll Eaton, owned the Silver Queen and commissioned the painting in 1958. Jerry's stepdaughter, Sharon, placed all of the coins in the painting while pregnant with her own daughter. Thus, the painting is at the intersection of three generations of women.

== Amenities ==
The Silver Queen Hotel does not offer modern amenities — such as elevators, air conditioners, televisions, and Wi-Fi — in order to maintain a historical ambience.

=== Saloon ===
A spacious saloon dating back from the 1870s is found at the main floor. It has very large single-piece wooden back bars and bar counters. The Silver Queen is also displayed at the saloon.

=== Chapel ===
The historic chapel is a popular wedding spot. Captain and Tennille unceremoniously married at the chapel.

The chapel was once used as a makeshift morgue during the time when the land was too cold to bury the dead.

== In popular culture ==
Several paranormal TV shows and surveys have been conducted at the Silver Queen Hotel. Owner Connie Carlson said that the hotel keeps a book where guests can write down their experience. The hotel is also believed to house a ghost named Rosie, a prostitute who supposedly killed herself.

The Silver Queen Hotel was featured five times at Travel Channel’s Ghost Adventures. In an episode, Zak Bagans returned to Silver Queen Hotel to apologize to a spirit he mocked during a previous investigation. The experience inspired Bagans to tattoo his arm with the number 11, referring to the room number where the incident occurred.

The management, however, affirms the stories, deeming the hotel a ghost hunter's delight.
