= Tolland, Connecticut =

- Town
- Town of Tolland
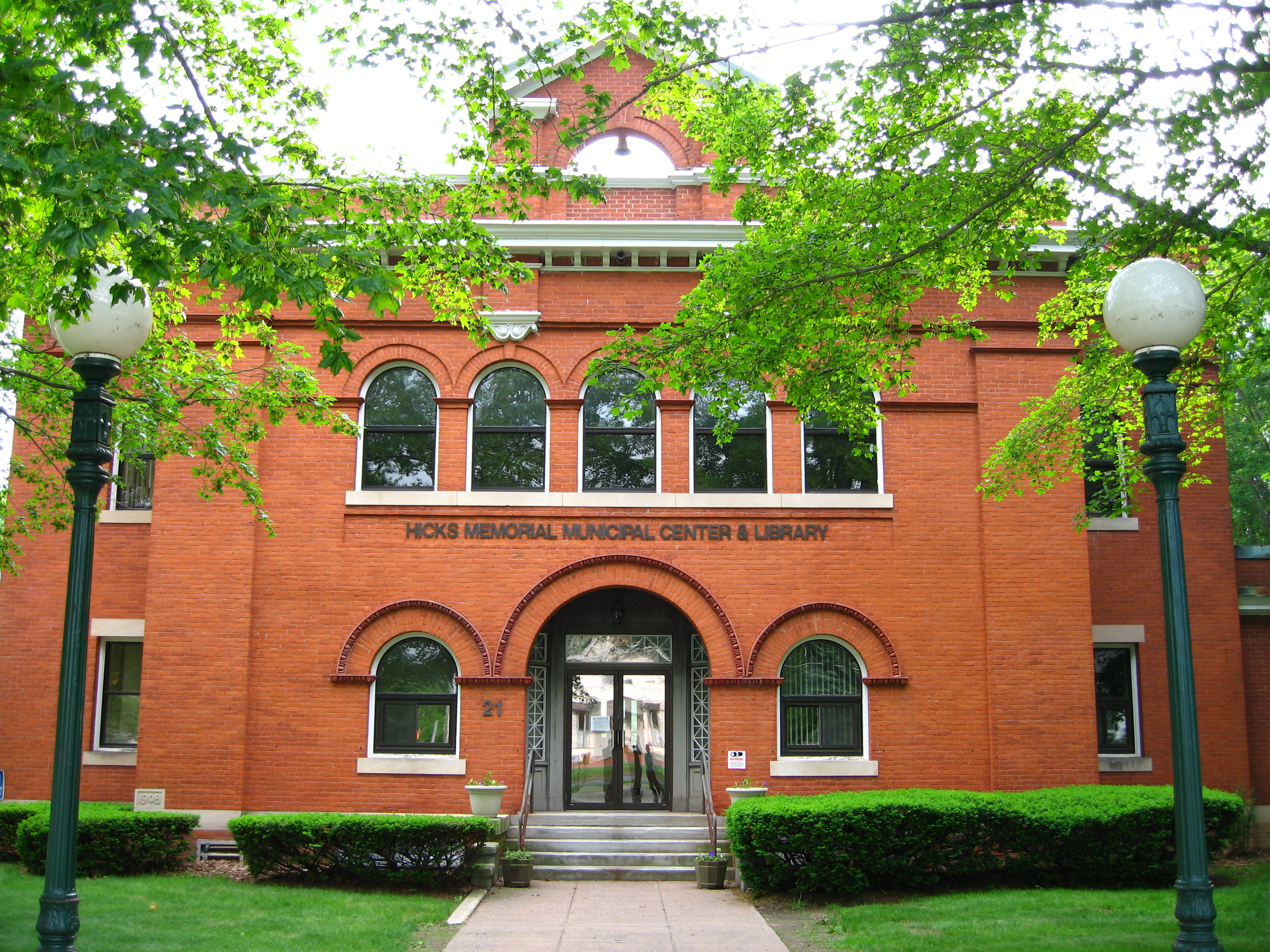
- Hicks Memorial Municipal Center and Library

- Seal

- Coordinates: 41°52′19.85″N 72°22′10.06″W
- Country: United States
- U.S. state: Connecticut
- County: Tolland
- Region: Capitol Region
- Incorporated: 1715

Government
  - Type: Council-manager
  - Town manager: Brian Foley
  - Town council: Jacob Marie (R), Chm. Christopher Moran (D), Vice Chm. Katie Stargarter (D); Colleen Yudichak (U); Joseph Sce (R); Alexander Noonan (R); Jennifer Buckler (D)

Area
  - Total: 40.3 sq mi (104.4 km^{2})
  - Land: 39.7 sq mi (102.9 km^{2})
  - Water: 0.58 sq mi (1.5 km^{2})
- Elevation: 660 ft (200 m)

Population (2020)
  - Total: 14,563
  - Density: 366/sq mi (141.5/km^{2})
- Time zone: UTC-5 (Eastern)
  - Summer (DST): UTC-4 (Eastern)
- ZIP Code: 06084
- Area codes: 860/959
- FIPS code: 09-76290
- GNIS feature ID: 0212667
- Website: www.tollandct.gov

Tolland (/ˈtɑːlənd/ TAH-lənd) is a suburban town in Tolland County, Connecticut, United States. The town is part of the Capitol Planning Region. The population was 14,563 at the 2020 census.

== History ==
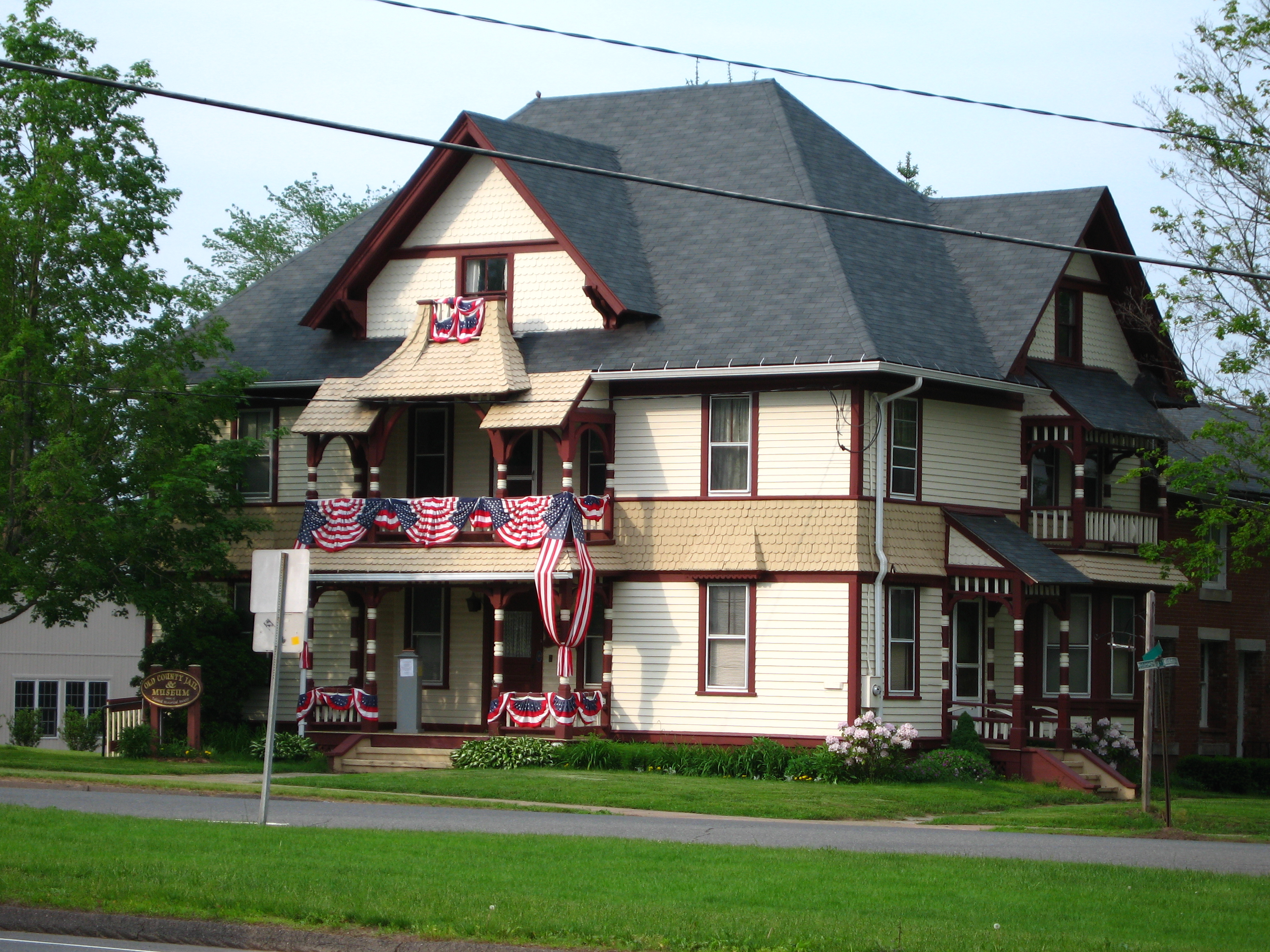
Old County Jail Museum

Tolland was named in May 1715, and incorporated in May 1722 from Windsor. The town was over 20 miles away from Tolland and was incorporated to grow the population out in the hill areas. According to some, the town derives its name from being a toll station on the old road between Boston and New York. Alternatively, its name could have been taken after Tolland in Somerset, England. Today Interstate 84, the main highway connecting New York City, Hartford, Connecticut and Boston, bisects Tolland, but the town retains a charming village feel. Tolland Green is the informal center of the community, and a national historic district. The Green's features include an old-fashioned penny candy and antiques store known to locals as the 'Red and White'; the town's original 19th-century town hall, now an arts center; the Old Tolland County Jail and Museum; the Tolland County Courthouse and former public library; the 'Tolland Inn' bed and breakfast; and the Hicks-Stearns Family Museum, a restored Victorian house. The architectural styles on display, including the white steeples of several churches, are reminiscent of a picture-postcard New England scene. The town is also home to the supposedly haunted Daniel Benton Homestead, built in 1720 and the oldest house in Tolland.

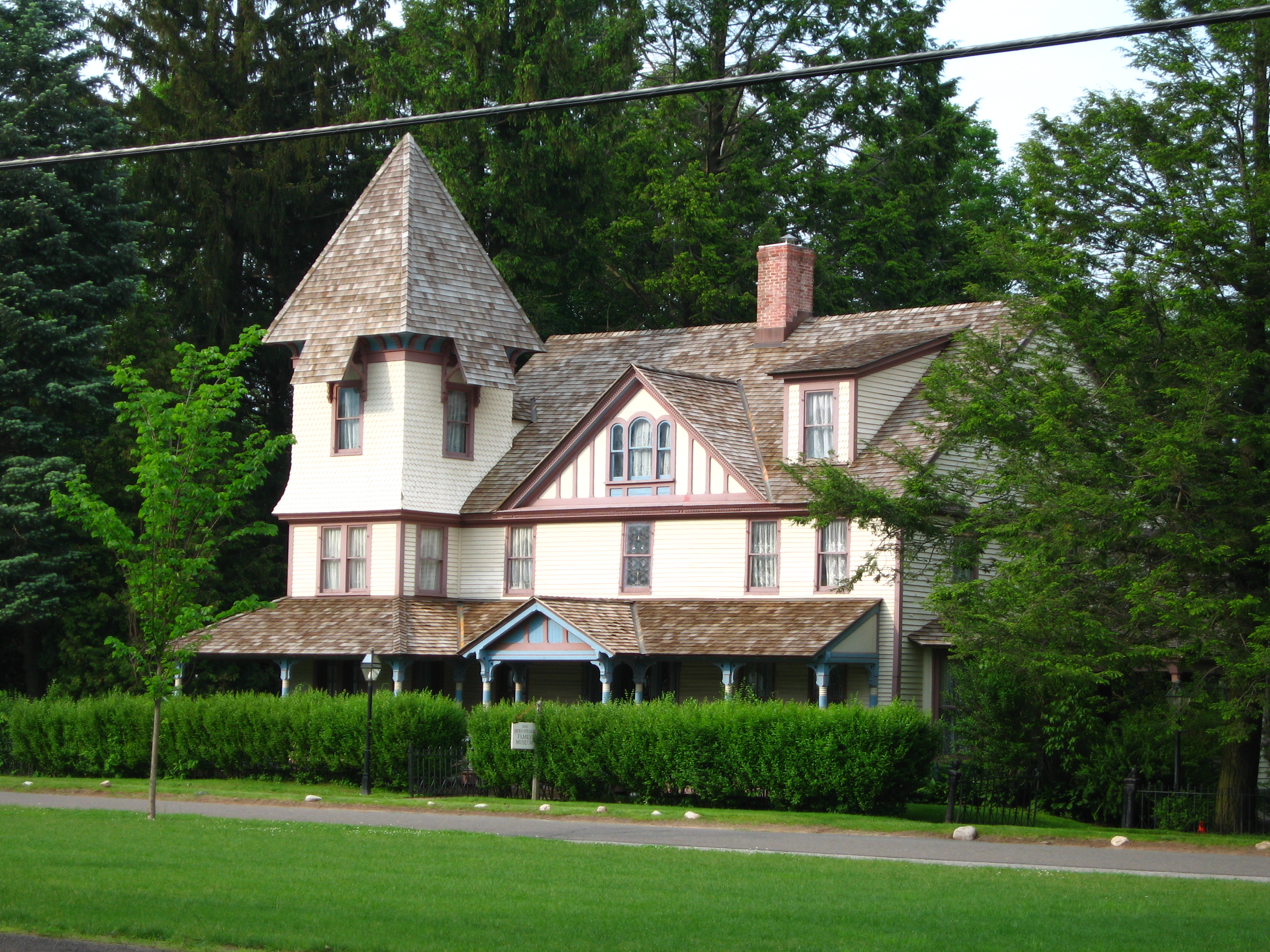
Hicks-Stearns Family Museum

Many of the town's adults work in Hartford, located about 30 minutes away, often at one of the city's many insurance companies, or for the University of Connecticut in Storrs, to the south. A family-oriented town, the landscape of Tolland is primarily composed of houses on plots of land around two acres. Undeveloped, forested land covers the area between the town's many residential developments. Containing two state forests and several municipal parks, the town retains a relatively rural character.

The Tolland Public Library opened in 1899. Located in the old county courthouse until 1985, the library was moved to the former Hicks Memorial School in 1985. It was significantly expanded in 2017.

In 2006, Tolland opened the new Tolland High School to support the growing number of students. The town is also expanding with new commercial and residential developments.

In April 2008, Wes Craven began filming scenes for his 2009 movie My Soul to Take inside the former Tolland High School.

In September 2019, it was announced that Birch Grove Elementary School would undergo renovation after the foundation started to crack due to the presence of pyrrhotite in the cement. Construction is expected to complete in August 2021.

== Geography ==
According to the United States Census Bureau, the town has a total area of 40.3 sq mi (104.4 km^{2}), of which 39.7 sq mi (102.8 km^{2}) is land and 0.58 sq mi (1.5 km^{2}) (1.46%) is water.

Nearby towns include Coventry, Ellington, Mansfield, Stafford, Vernon, and Willington, Connecticut.

== Climate ==
Tolland's climate is classified as warm summer continental (Dfb), as is typical of the eastern hills of Connecticut. The area enjoys some characteristics hot-summer continental climate (Dfa) due to a relatively high July mean temperature of 70.7 °F (21.5 °C), which is very close to the threshold of 71.6 °F (22 °C) mean temperature required for a hot-summer climate. The area experiences four distinct seasons, with cold, snowy winters and warm to hot summers. The climate of Tolland is distinguished from the warmer climate of nearby Hartford due to its elevation. The area is prone to blizzards and ice storms in the winter, and during the summer it occasionally experiences tropical activity (though less severe than in lower elevations of the state). Precipitation is distributed fairly evenly throughout the year, with the wettest month being November and the driest being February.

Climate data for Tolland, Connecticut
Month	Jan	Feb	Mar	Apr	May	Jun	Jul	Aug	Sep	Oct	Nov	Dec	Year
Record high °F (°C)	67 (19)	69 (21)	83 (28)	93 (34)	91 (33)	96 (36)	98 (37)	96 (36)	96 (36)	86 (30)	78 (26)	71 (22)	98 (37)
Mean daily maximum °F (°C)	34.3 (1.3)	37.7 (3.2)	45.9 (7.7)	57.9 (14.4)	68.6 (20.3)	76.4 (24.7)	80.9 (27.2)	79.6 (26.4)	72.5 (22.5)	61.3 (16.3)	50.9 (10.5)	39.3 (4.1)	58.8 (14.9)
Daily mean °F (°C)	25 (−4)	28.1 (−2.2)	35.8 (2.1)	47 (8)	57 (14)	65.8 (18.8)	70.7 (21.5)	69.4 (20.8)	61.8 (16.6)	50.4 (10.2)	41.3 (5.2)	30.7 (−0.7)	48.6 (9.2)
Mean daily minimum °F (°C)	15.7 (−9.1)	18.5 (−7.5)	25.6 (−3.6)	36 (2)	45.4 (7.4)	55.1 (12.8)	60.4 (15.8)	59.1 (15.1)	51 (11)	39.5 (4.2)	31.7 (−0.2)	22 (−6)	38.3 (3.5)
Record low °F (°C)	−32 (−36)	−27 (−33)	−24 (−31)	4 (−16)	20 (−7)	27 (−3)	34 (1)	28 (−2)	20 (−7)	13 (−11)	−5 (−21)	−19 (−28)	−32 (−36)
Average precipitation inches (mm)	4.38 (111)	3.11 (79)	4.32 (110)	4.54 (115)	3.96 (101)	4.46 (113)	4.08 (104)	4.07 (103)	4.54 (115)	4.56 (116)	4.64 (118)	4.02 (102)	50.68 (1,287)

== Demographics ==
Historical population
Census	Pop.	Note	%±
1820	1,597		—
1850	1,406		—
1860	1,310		−6.8%
1870	1,216		−7.2%
1880	1,169		−3.9%
1890	1,037		−11.3%
1900	1,036		−0.1%
1910	1,126		8.7%
1920	1,040		−7.6%
1930	1,064		2.3%
1940	1,192		12.0%
1950	1,659		39.2%
1960	2,950		77.8%
1970	7,857		166.3%
1980	9,694		23.4%
1990	11,001		13.5%
2000	13,146		19.5%
2010	15,052		14.5%
2020	14,563		−3.2%
U.S. Decennial Census

As of the census of 2010, there were 15,052 people, divided into 5,092 households living in the town. The average household size was 2.9 people. The population density was 373.0 inhabitants per square mile (144.0/km^{2}). The racial makeup of the town was 94.1% White (93.2% non-Hispanic White), 0.8% African American, 2.0% Asian, and 1.7% from two or more races. Hispanic or Latino of any race were 1.6% of the population. In terms of language, 94% of Tolland's residents spoke English at home, and 4.1% of residents were foreign-born. The median age was 41 years. The median income for a household in the town was $110,781, and the median income for a family was $122,299. The per capita income for the town was $47,611, and around 1.7% of the population was below the poverty line. 122 families received Supplemental Security Income or some other form of cash assistance, and 945 residents (0.6%) were on social security.

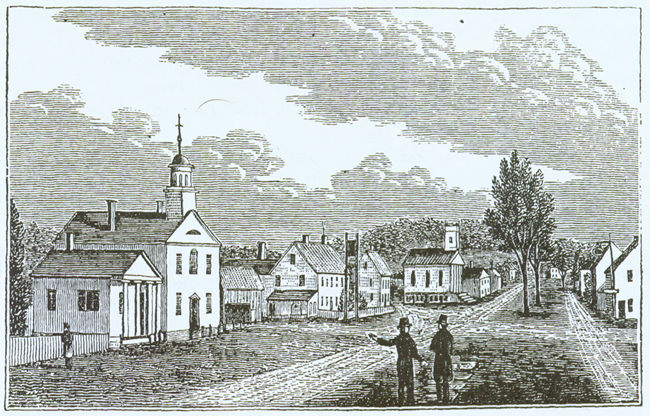
South View of the Central Part of Tolland, wood block engraving from a sketch by John Warner Barber for his Historical Collections of Connecticut (New Haven, 1836)

As of the census of 2000, there were 13,146 people, 4,586 households, and 3,788 families residing in the town. The population density was 331.0 inhabitants per square mile (127.8/km^{2}). There were 4,665 housing units at an average density of 117.5 per square mile (45.4/km^{2}). The racial makeup of the town was 97.36% White, 0.57% African American, 0.08% Native American, 1.19% Asian, 0.02% Pacific Islander, 0.39% from other races, and 0.81% from two or more races. Hispanic or Latino of any race were .75% of the population.

There were 4,586 households, out of which 42.3% had children under the age of 18 living with them, 74.4% were married couples living together, 1.9% had a female householder, and 17.4% were non-families. 13.0% of all households were made up of individuals, and 4.1% had someone living alone who was 65 years of age or older. The average household size was 2.83 and the average family size was 3.12.

== Government ==
Tolland was governed by town meeting until November 1973, when it adopted a new charter. The principal governing body of Tolland is the elected Town Council, which is responsible for making policy and major decisions about the town's future. The day-to-day operations of the town are handled by a Town Manager, a paid professional appointed by the Council and charged with implementing and executing Council policy and decisions.

The Council consists of seven unpaid members elected in a general election in the town every two years. Currently, the Council consists of three Republicans and four Democrats, and was elected in November 2023. The council selects its own chairman and vice-chairman, with the chairman traditionally being the highest vote-getter among the four majority-party members and the vice-chairman the highest among the minority party members, though the council is not under obligation to follow this pattern. Except for Executive Sessions (which are held to renegotiate contracts with Town employees, among other reasons) meetings are open to the public and contain a time for citizens to address the Council from the floor. As of November 2025, meetings are held on the second and fourth Tuesdays of the month at 7:00pm in the 6th floor Council Chambers of the Hicks Municipal Building at 21 Tolland Green.

== Education ==
- Birch Grove Primary School, Pre-kindergarten, Grade 2
- Tolland Intermediate School, Grades 3–5
- Tolland Middle School, Grades 6–8
- Tolland High School, Grades 9–12
  - Tolland Alternative Learning Center (TALC)

== Notable locations ==
- The Daniel Benton Homestead was built in 1720 and is the oldest home in Tolland. It is now a museum.
- The Hicks-Stearns Family Museum is a restored Victorian-era house museum built in 1788 and once inhabited by Ratcliffe Hicks.
- The Old Tolland County Jail and Museum is a property including the 1856 jail which operated until 1968 and attached Jailer's home.

=== On the National Register of Historic Places ===
- Tolland County Courthouse – listed on the National Register of Historic Places (NRHP) in 1977.
- Tolland Green Historic District – founded in 1706 and added to the National Register of Historic Places in 1997.

== Notable people ==
- Edward K. Beale (born 1970), Author, USCG helicopter pilot during Hurricane Katrina; raised in Tolland and graduated from Tolland High School
- Daniel C. Burbank (born 1961), NASA astronaut; raised in Tolland and graduated from Tolland High School in 1979
- Henry D. Cogswell (1820–1900), dentist and a crusader in the temperance movement; born in Tolland
- William W. Eaton (1816–1898), US Congressman and US Senator; born in Tolland and a resident of Tolland
- Ratcliffe Hicks (1843–1906), state legislator, lawyer, industrialist, and benefactor of the University of Connecticut
- Jonathan Hatch Hubbard (1768–1849), US Congressman for Vermont; born in Tolland
- Charles R. Ladd (1822–1903), lawyer, politician and Massachusetts Auditor; born in Tolland
- David Passaro (born 1966), CIA contractor and former US Army Ranger; graduated from Tolland High School
- Shubal Stearns (1706–1771), evangelist, preacher of the Separate Baptists; resident of Tolland
- James Stevenson (born 1981), actor; raised in Tolland
- Loren P. Waldo (1802–1881), lawyer and US Congressman; resident of Tolland
- Calvin Willey (1776–1858), American lawyer, politician, and US Senator (1825–1831); resident of Tolland
- Nancy Wyman (1946–2026), Lieutenant Governor of Connecticut and State Comptroller; resident of Tolland
- Tammy Nuccio, Connecticut State Representative 53rd General Assembly District; resident of Tolland
