= Tolland County Courthouse =

- U.S. National Register of Historic Places
- U.S. Historic district – Contributing property
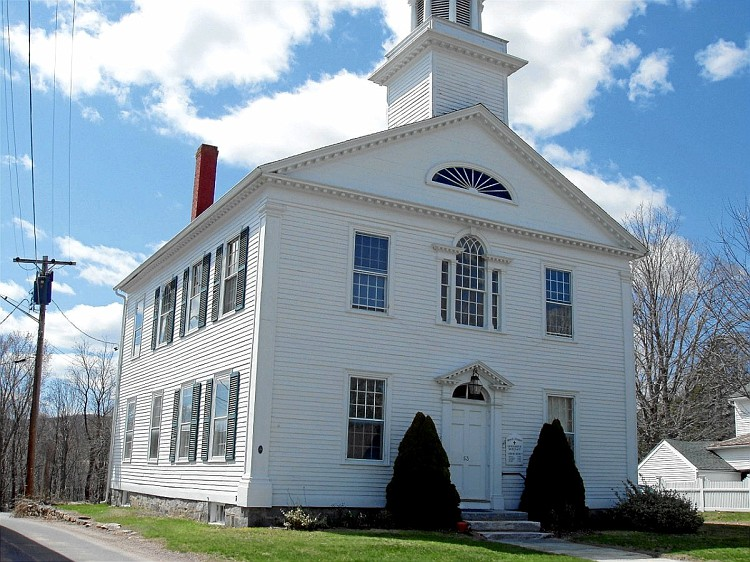

- Location within Connecticut Location within the United States
- Interactive map showing the location of Tolland County Courthouse
- Location: 53 Tolland Green, Tolland, Connecticut
- Coordinates: 41°52′18″N 72°22′11″W
- Architectural style: Federal
- Part of: Tolland Green Historic District (ID09000084)
- NRHP reference No.: 09000084

Significant dates
- Added to NRHP: September 17, 1977
- Designated CP: August 1, 1997

The Old Tolland County Courthouse is a historic former courthouse at 53 Tolland Green in Tolland, Connecticut. Built in 1822 it was used as a county courthouse until the 1890s. It housed the Tolland Public Library from 1899 to 1985. Now a history museum operated by the Tolland Historical Society, the building was listed on the National Register of Historic Places in 1977.

== Description and history ==
The Old Tolland County Courthouse is located on the west side of the Tolland Green, roughly at the junction of Connecticut Routes 195 and 74. Build in the neoclassical Federal style, the courthouse a 2 1/2-story wood-frame structure, with a gabled roof and clapboarded exterior with a Palladian window. The roof is topped by a two-story tower, with a square base and an octagonal louvered belfry capped by a round cupola. The main building facade is three bays wide, with corner pilasters rising to an entablature and gabled pediment. The main entrance is flanked by pilasters and topped by a half-round transom window and gabled pediment. The interior has been restored, with the second floor resembling its original appearance as a courtroom.

The courthouse was built in 1822, when Tolland was the county seat of Tolland County. The courthouse remained in service as such until 1890, when county courts mostly moved to Rockville. Starting in 1899, the courthouse housed the town's public library. In 1930, the courthouse was sold for $1 to Samuel Simpson, who promptly donated the building to the Tolland Public Library Association. The building continued to house the probate courts for Tolland and neighboring Ellington until 1960.

The courthouse served as the Tolland Public Library until 1985, when the library moved to the renovated and expanded Hicks Municipal Building and Library Complex, formerly the Hicks Memorial School. In 2001, the Tolland Public Library Association donated the courthouse to the Tolland Historical Society, which oversaw its restoration and conversion to a museum. The first floor of the courthouse also houses the library and offices of the French-Canadian Genealogical Society of Connecticut.

== See also ==
- National Register of Historic Places listings in Tolland County, Connecticut
