= Old Tolland County Jail and Museum =

- U.S. Historic district – Contributing property
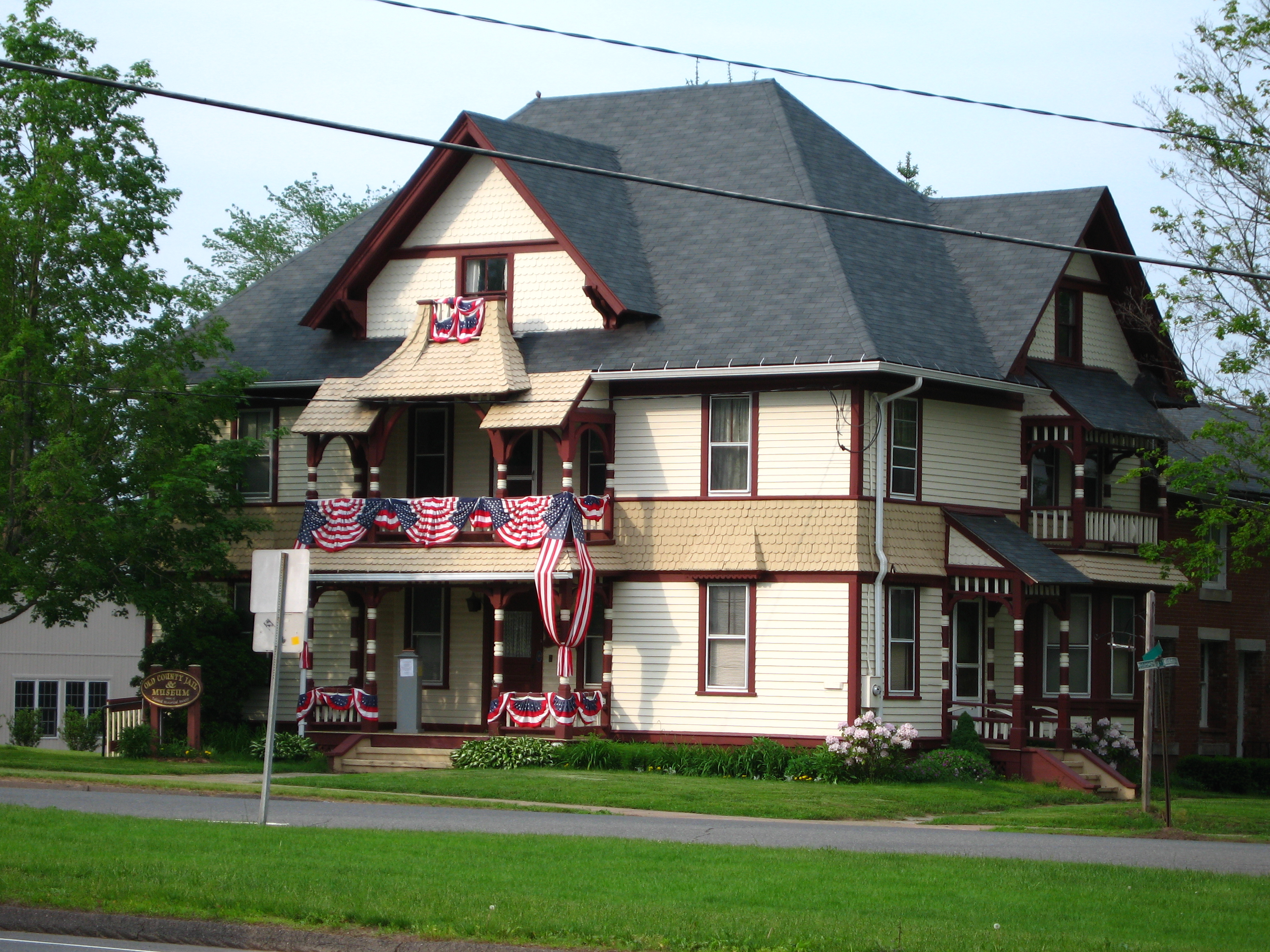
- The front side of the jail.
- Location: 52 Tolland Green, Tolland, Connecticut
- Architect: James H. Clough
- Part of: Tolland Green Historic District (ID97000832)
- Added to NRHP: August 1, 1997

The Old Tolland County Jail and Museum is a historic jail in Tolland, Connecticut. It is located at 52 Tolland Green. The present jail was in use from 1856 to 1968. The Jail served as the county jail in the 19th and 20th century for criminals who were convicted of a crime or were awaiting a trial at the courthouse across the street. The jail also had a hotel in front until a fire burned it down in 1893. The hotel, known as the County House, was used to provide hospitality to visitors who had jail or court related business.

== History ==
The jail was built over several times. Its earliest section, made of stone and built in 1856, was in fact the fourth jail built on that site. In 1893, a brick section was added, doubling the number of cells from 16 to 32.

Management of the jail remained in the hands of the county administration until 1960, when it was transferred to the state government. The state managed it from 1960 to 1968.

== Museum ==
The building is now operated as a museum by the Tolland Historical Society.

Many of its former inmates have visited the 32-cell site of their incarceration. They are found telling tales to visitors about their days in the "Hollyhock Hotel", affectionately named for the flowers that once adorned the side of the jail.

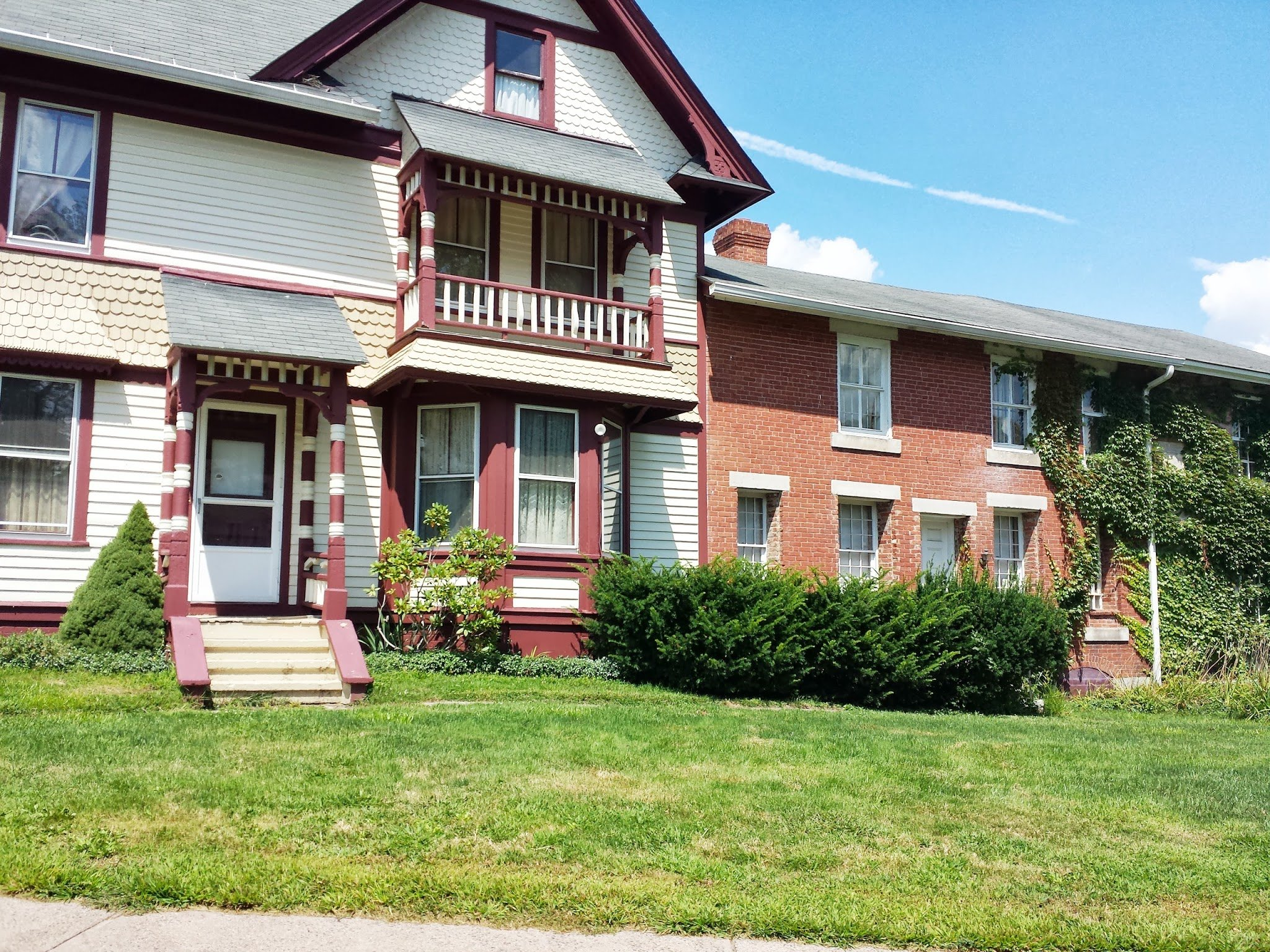
A front side view of the jail that shows more of the side and some of the first jail section.
