= The Country House (restaurant) =

Restaurant in Illinois

Coordinates: 41.7884°N 87.9554°W

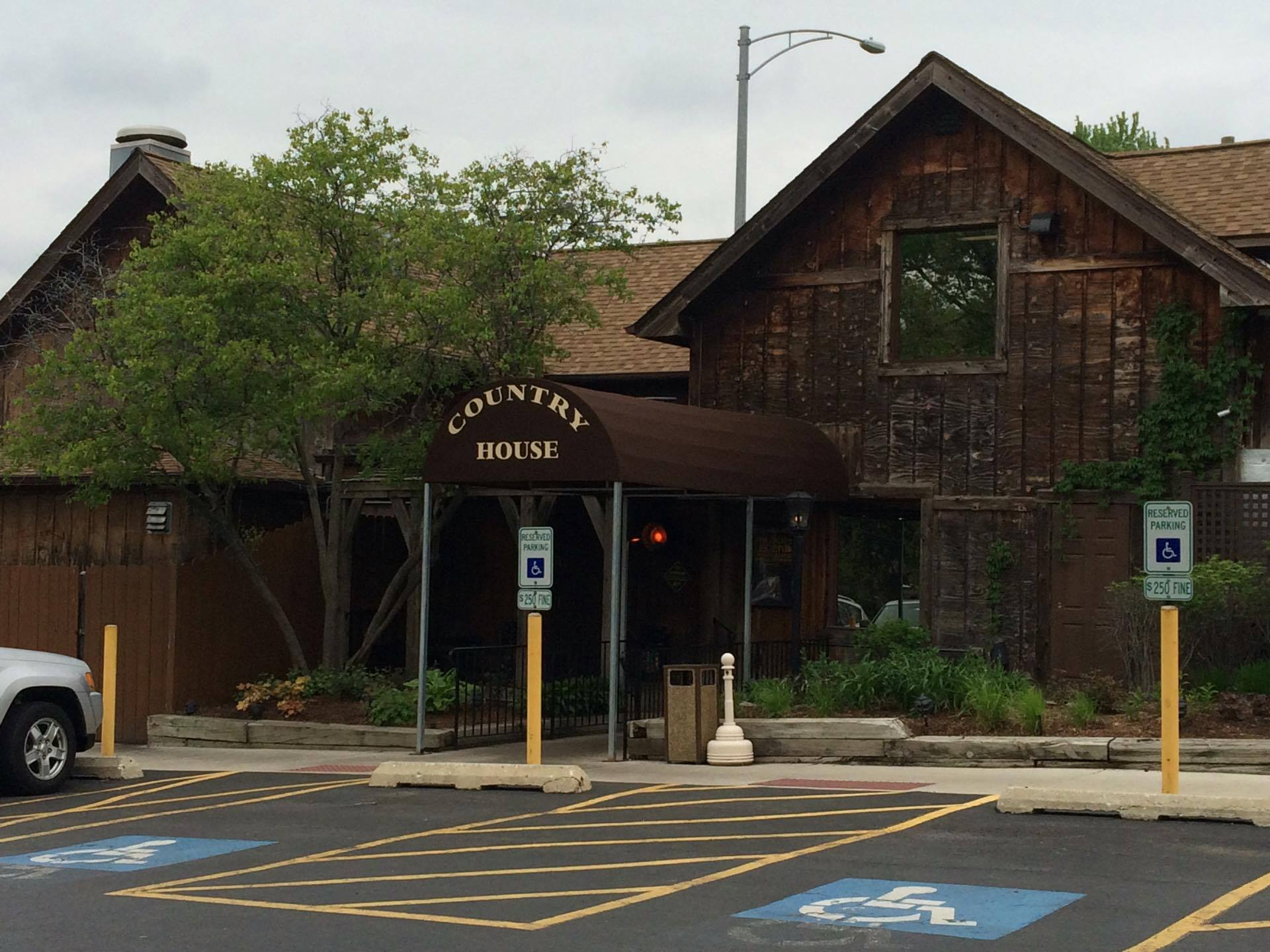
The Country House

The Country House is a restaurant located at 241 W. 55th St. in Clarendon Hills, Illinois. It is known for casual dining, long-standing history, and paranormal activity.

== History ==
The restaurant was opened in 1922 by Emil Kobal. The two-story building served two purposes. The bottom floor was opened as a tavern and small grocery store, whereas the top floor served as his family's home.

The Country House has changed hands twice since its opening. In 1957, Richard Montanelli bought the business for his mother, but it suffered under her declining health. Four area residents purchased The Country House from Montanelli in 1974, and it underwent extensive renovations under their ownership, including the introduction of a new menu. Its "famous" burger was featured on this menu. Three of the original owners later sold their shares to the remaining partner. By 1989, David Regnery retained sole ownership.

In 1985, a second Country House was opened in Lisle, Illinois and closed in 2020 due to the COVID-19 pandemic. In 1996, a third Country House was opened in Geneva, Illinois and closed in 2025.

David Regnery died in 2009 and ownership was transferred to his siblings and longtime General Manager. The Clarendon Hills restaurant continues to operate.
