= Wesoły =

Wesoły is a surname. Notable people with the surname include:

- Marek Wesoły (cyclist) (born 1978), Polish former professional road cyclist
- Marek Wesoły (born 1972), Polish politician, member of the Polish Government
- Szczepan Wesoły (1926–2018), Polish Catholic titular archbishop and auxiliary bishop

== See also ==
- Sloper-Wesoly House, a historic house in New Britain, Connecticut, United States
