= Tunxis (disambiguation) =

The Tunxis were a Native American tribe.

Tunxis may also refer to:

- Tunxis Community College, Farmington, Connecticut
- Tunxis Trail, a hiking trail in the central Connecticut valley
- Tunxis Hose Firehouse, an 1893 historic firehouse in Unionville, Connecticut
- Tunxis Management, a real estate investment company in Connecticut
- Tunxis Country Club, a public golf course in Farmington, Connecticut
- USS Tunxis (1864), an American Civil War monitor
- USS Tunxis (AN-90), a World War II net laying ship
