= Copper Ledges and Chimney Crest =

- U.S. National Register of Historic Places
- U.S. Historic district
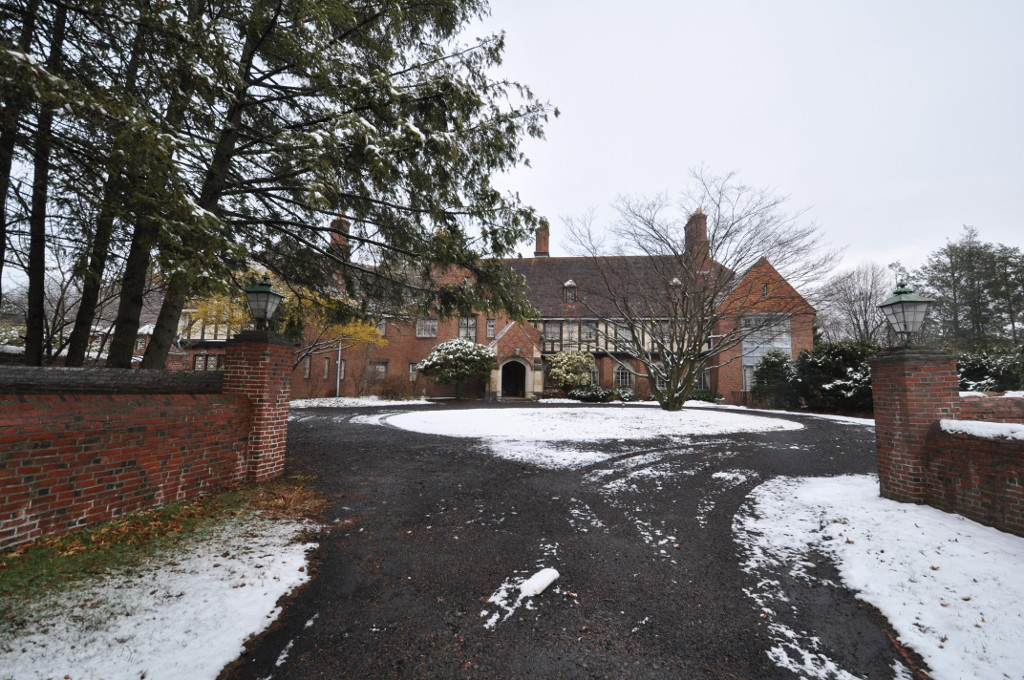
- Chimney Crest

- Location within Connecticut Location within the United States
- Location: Along Founders Drive between Bradley and Woodland Streets, Bristol, Connecticut
- Coordinates: 41°40′45″N 72°56′3″W
- Area: 5.5 acres (2.2 ha)
- Built: 1924
- Architectural style: Colonial Revival, Tudor Revival, Georgian Revival
- NRHP reference No.: 92001010
- Added to NRHP: August 21, 1992

Copper Ledges and Chimney Crest are a pair of luxurious mansion estates on Founders Drive in Bristol, Connecticut. They were built in 1924 and 1930 for brothers Fuller and Harry Barnes, owners of the locally prominent Wallace Barnes Company, later American Spring. Both are major works by regionally prominent architects, and the pair were listed on the National Register of Historic Places in 1992. Chimney Crest is in private ownership; Copper Ledges is in private ownership.

== Description and history ==
The Barnes family compound is located on the northeast side of Bristol's Federal Hill area, its most fashionable residential area of the early 20th century. Chimney Crest, a large Tudor mansion house stands at the southeast corner of Founders Drive and Woodland Street. Copper Ledges, a large Colonial Revival mansion, stands at the bend in Founders Drive just east of Bradley Street. The estate property, originally 14 acres (5.7 ha), has been subdivided for development, and now only 5.5 acres (2.2 ha) remain associated with these two houses. Outbuildings of the compound include a guest house and log cabin, both on the east side of Founders Drive, and a loggia at the southern end of Copper Ledges's formal gardens.

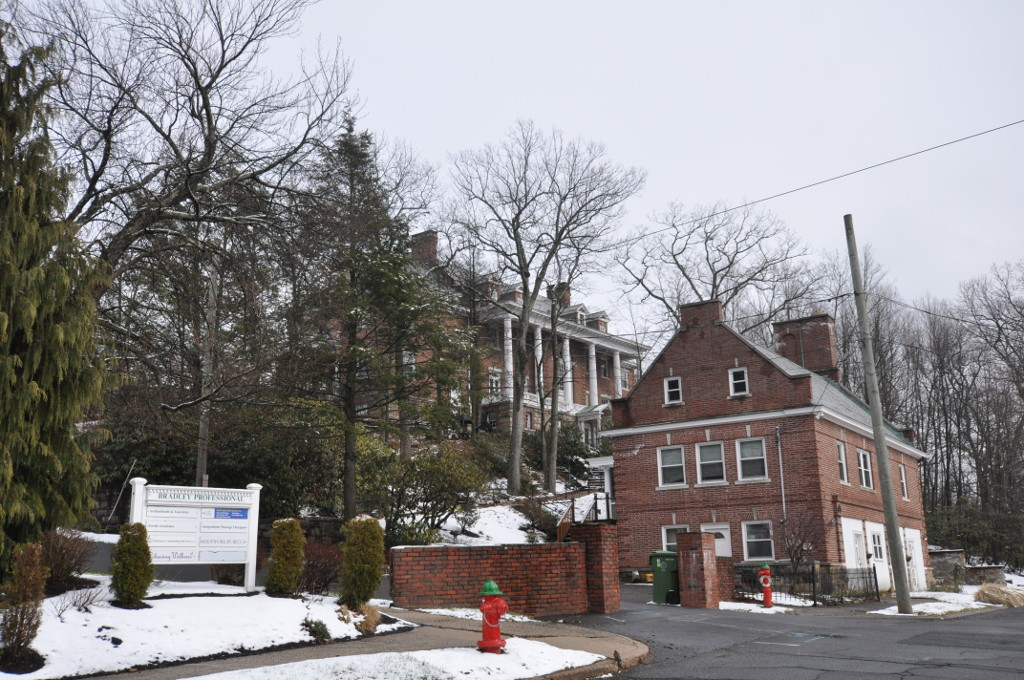
Copper Crest, up on top of the hill

Fuller Barnes and Henry Barnes were the grandsons of Wallace Barnes, who began manufacturing springs for clocks in the 1860s. The brothers greatly expanded the business, transforming it into the Associated Spring Company. Fuller Barnes acquired this estate property in 1920, and Copper Ledges was built for him in 1924. It was designed by Harold Hayden, a local architect, and is judged his most significant residential commission. Late in his life he donated it to Bristol Hospital, with the idea that it be used as a convalescent home. This idea proved unworkable, and the estate was from 1960 to 1970 home to the Laurel Crest Academy, which built ancillary buildings on Bradley Street, and also rented Chimney Crest. Chimney Crest was built for Henry Barnes in 1930; it was designed by Perry & Bishop, based in New Britain.

As of 2025, the estates remain privately owned.

== See also ==
- National Register of Historic Places listings in Hartford County, Connecticut
