= First Lutheran Church of the Reformation =

Historic church in Connecticut, United States

- U.S. National Register of Historic Places
- U.S. Historic district – Contributing property
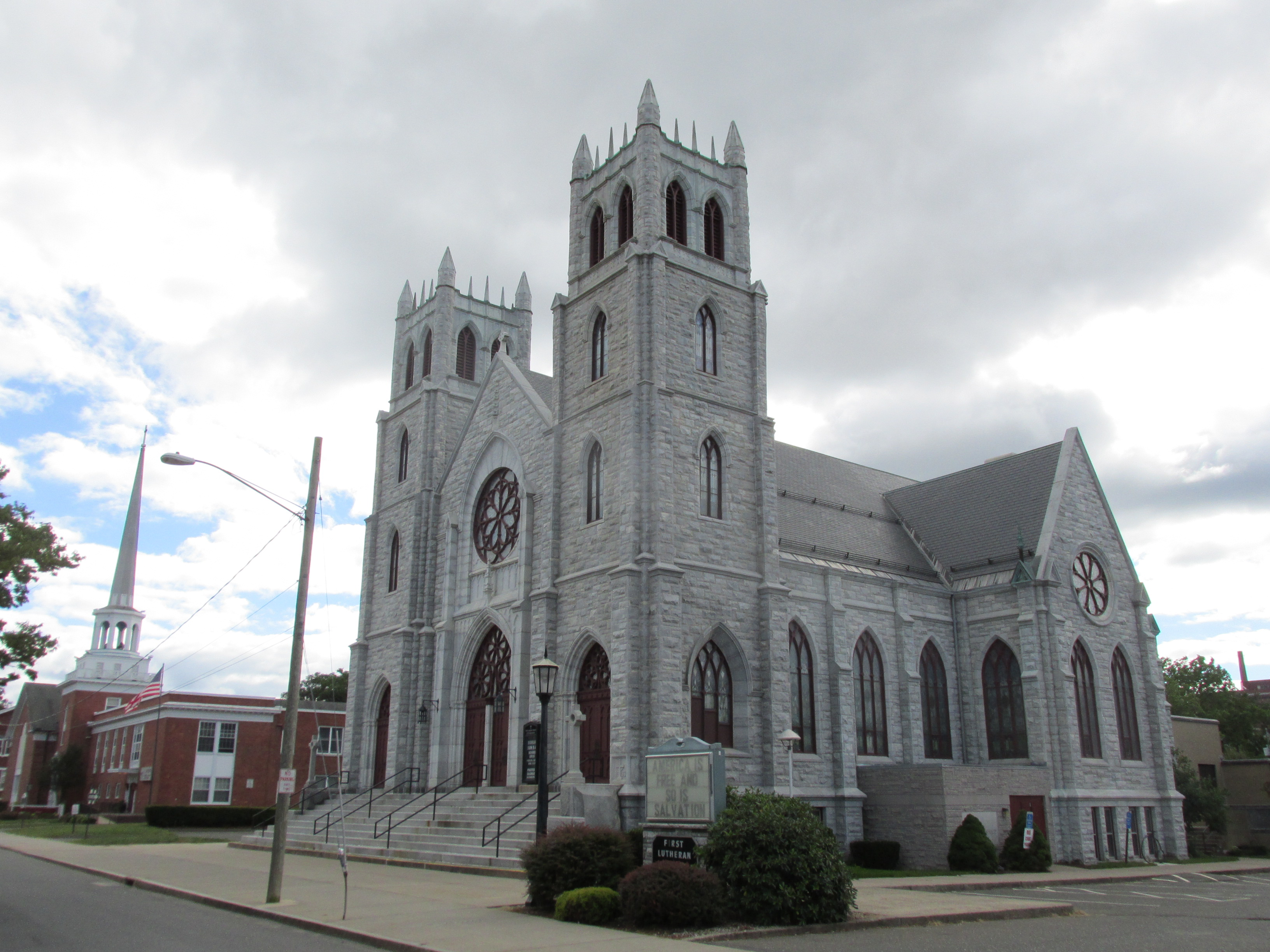

- Location within Connecticut Location within the United States
- Location: 77 Franklin Square, New Britain, Connecticut
- Coordinates: 41°39′46″N 72°46′50″W
- Built: 1903
- Architect: Caldwell, William
- Architectural style: Late Gothic Revival
- Part of: Downtown New Britain (ID16000210)
- NRHP reference No.: 10000825

Significant dates
- Added to NRHP: August 30, 2010
- Designated CP: May 3, 2016

The First Lutheran Church of the Reformation is a historic church at 77 Franklin Square in New Britain, Connecticut. The congregation was founded in 1885 and the current church building was constructed 1903-07. The building, a fine local example of Late Gothic Revival architecture, was added to the National Register of Historic Places in 2010.

== Architecture and history ==
The First Lutheran Church of the Reformation stands in downtown New Britain, on the west side of Franklin Square near its northern end. It is a large stone structure, built out of granite and adorned with Gothic features. It is symmetrical, with a pair of square four-stage towers rising to pinnacles on either side of the front facade; the original steeples were removed after one was struck by lightning. The tower corners are buttressed, and the side window bays are articulated by buttresses. Windows are generally lancet-arched in the Gothic style. At the center of the main facade is a large rose window set in a recessed lancet-arched panel.

New Britain saw a large influx of immigrants from northern Europe in the second half of the 19th century. Both Germans and Swedes settled in the city in large numbers, bringing their Lutheran faith with them. The First Lutheran Church of the Reformation was formally organized in the 1880s, when its first building was erected. The present building was constructed in 1903-07 to provide space for its rapidly growing congregation. It was designed by William Caldwell, with later additions in the 20th century by Walter Crabtree.

== See also ==
- National Register of Historic Places listings in Hartford County, Connecticut
