= Clark Farm Tenant House site =

Archaeological site in Connecticut, United States

- U.S. National Register of Historic Places
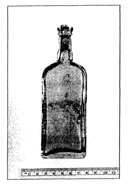
- A glass bottle found at the site
- Nearest city: East Granby, Connecticut
- Area: 0.3 acres (0.12 ha)
- Built: 1860
- NRHP reference No.: 01001554
- Added to NRHP: January 31, 2002

The Clark Farm Tenant House site is a historical archaeological site in East Granby, Connecticut. It consists of the remnants of a farm outbuilding that was occupied in the late 19th and early 20th centuries by farm laborers, providing a rare window into the material culture associated with that population. The site was listed on the National Register of Historic Places in 2002.

== Description ==
The Clark Farm Tenant House is located near one of the town's major roads, on land that once belonged to the Clark family, who were major landowners in the area in the 19th and early 20th centuries. Its only surface features are the protruding remains of a fieldstone foundation, measuring about 18 by 29.5 feet (5.5 m × 9.0 m). Based on aerial photographs of the area taken in the 1930s, augmented by interviews with longtime local residents, the structure that stood on the foundation was a roughly framed gable-roofed house. Other features of the site, not visible from the surface, include a shallow dug well and a privy.

The house is believed to have been occupied by tenant farmers of the surrounding farmland, from about 1860 to about 1940; the house burned down in the 1940s. The land was owned by Charles P. Clark, who owned hundreds of acres of land in the town, and was one of its major tobacco growers. Tax records show that Clark owned four houses in the town, presumably living in one and renting the others to tenant farmers.

The site was identified during a state highway works project in 1996, and underwent an intensive excavation in 1998. That work identified the extent of the site, and recovered more than 3,000 artifacts, including many domestic items such as pottery sherds, glass, buttons, nails, trolley tokens, and a pocket watch.

== See also ==
- National Register of Historic Places listings in Hartford County, Connecticut
