= Edward L. Burnham Farm =

Historic house in Connecticut, United States

- U.S. National Register of Historic Places
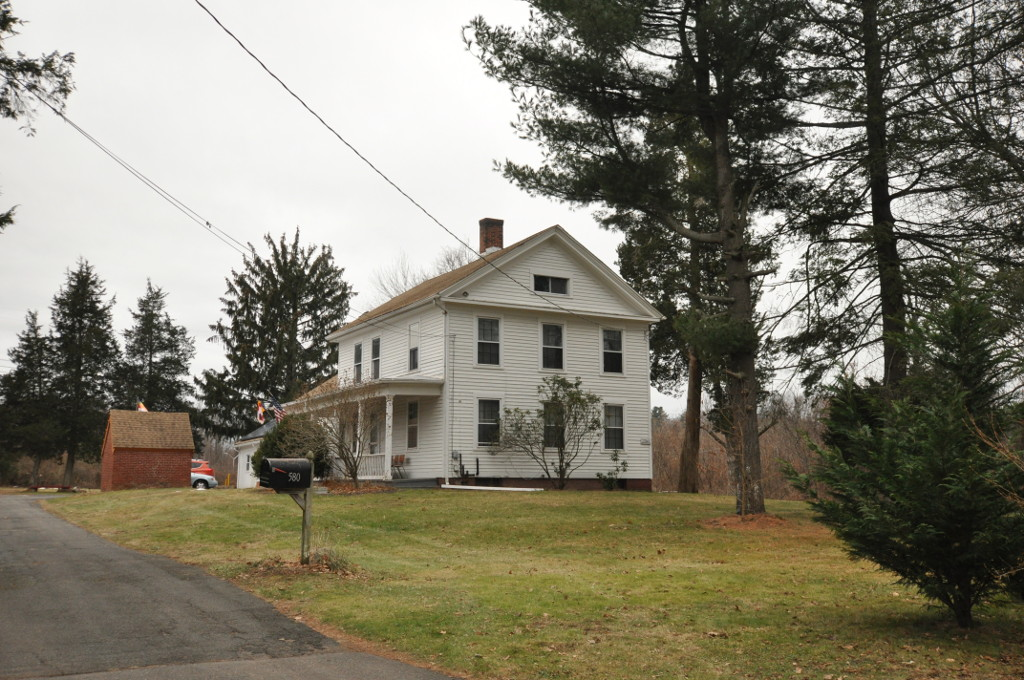

- Location within Connecticut Location within the United States
- Location: 580 Burnham Street West, Manchester, Connecticut
- Coordinates: 41°48′3″N 72°34′50″W
- Area: 21 acres (8.5 ha)
- Built: 1861
- Architectural style: Greek Revival
- NRHP reference No.: 82004436
- Added to NRHP: April 12, 1982

The Edward L. Burnham Farm is a historic farmstead at 580 Burnham Street West in Manchester, Connecticut. Built in 1861, the house is a well preserved example of a vernacular Greek Revival farmhouse. It was built for a locally prominent family that had farmed the surrounding land for generations. The house was listed on the National Register of Historic Places in 1982.

== Description and history ==
The Edward L. Burnham Farm house stands in the northwestern corner of Manchester, in a formerly rural-residential setting. The farm's 100 acres (40 ha) have been reduced by the construction of Interstate 291 and industrial development, and the farmstead now stands on about 1.5 acres (0.61 ha). It is located on the south side of Burnham Road West, just west of its junction with Chapel Road. It is a 2 1/2-story wood-frame structure, with a gabled roof and clapboarded exterior. It is oriented facing east, presenting a side elevation to the street. The front facade is three bays wide, with the entrance placed slightly off-center. A single-story hip-roof porch extends across that facade, supported by square posts with simple molded capitals. A kitchen ell extends the building to the south. The interior retains modest 19th-century vernacular Greek Revival finishes. The property also includes rare surviving dairy and ice houses from the 19th century.

The farmstead began with the purchase of 100 acres by Edward Burnham in 1860, by which time Hartford County was already one of the nation's leading producers of broadleaf tobacco. He began cultivating that crop, building this house for his family. The house is from a construction perspective of its period, using balloon framing, but is stylistically conservative in its Greek Revival elements. The farm was economically successful, with the Burnham family adding tobacco drying barns in 1903 and the late 1910s (now demolished).

== See also ==
- National Register of Historic Places listings in Hartford County, Connecticut
