= National Register of Historic Places listings in Hartford County, Connecticut =

Location of Hartford County in Connecticut

Hartford County, Connecticut, United States, has 440 properties and districts listed on the National Register of Historic Places, including 21 National Historic Landmarks. More than half of these listings are in the city of Hartford (145) and the towns of Windsor (41), Southington (41) and West Hartford (32). They are listed separately, while the 190 properties and districts in the remaining parts of the county are listed below. Four properties and districts extend into Hartford, Southington and/or New Haven County and appear in more than one list. The locations of National Register properties and districts for which the latitude and longitude coordinates are included below, may be seen in various online maps.

Contents: Counties and municipalities in Connecticut

Fairfield (city of Bridgeport | town of Greenwich | city of Stamford) | Hartford (city of Hartford | town of Southington | town of West Hartford | town of Windsor) | Litchfield | Middlesex (city of Middletown) | New Haven (city of New Haven) | New London | Tolland | Windham

This National Park Service list is complete through NPS recent listings posted October 16, 2026.

== Current listings ==
=== Other cities and towns ===
| | Name on the Register | Image | Date listed | Location | City or town | Description |
|---|---|---|---|---|---|---|
| 1 | Academy Hall | Academy Hall | October 7, 1977 (#77001419) | 785 Old Main Street; 41°39′58″N 72°38′20″W | Rocky Hill | Built in 1803, a Federal style building which served as a school from 1803 to 1941. It was believed to be one of few original Federal style buildings in Connecticut that had been little altered in its exterior. |
| 2 | Allen's Cider Mill | Allen's Cider Mill | April 28, 1992 (#92000389) | 7 Mountain Road; 41°59′44″N 72°49′56″W | Granby | Built in 1783; it was one of few surviving wooden cider mills in Connecticut at the time of its collapse in August 2019. |
| 3 | Avon Congregational Church | Avon Congregational Church | November 7, 1972 (#72001342) | Junction of U.S. Route 44 and U.S. Route 202; 41°48′36″N 72°49′52″W | Avon | |
| 4 | Babb's Beach | Babb's Beach | July 12, 2006 (#06000591) | 435 Babbs Road; 42°01′48″N 72°45′04″W | Suffield | |
| 5 | Horace Belden School and Central Grammar School | Horace Belden School and Central Grammar School | March 25, 1993 (#93000211) | 933 Hopmeadow Street and 29 Massaco Street; 41°52′52″N 72°48′12″W | Simsbury | |
| 6 | Beleden House | Beleden House | March 15, 1982 (#82004392) | 50 Bellevue Avenue; 41°40′31″N 72°56′25″W | Bristol | |
| 7 | Makens Bemont House | Makens Bemont House | March 25, 1982 (#82004397) | 307 Burnside Avenue; 41°46′33″N 72°37′31″W | East Hartford | |
| 8 | Bigelow-Hartford Carpet Mills Historic District | Bigelow-Hartford Carpet Mills Historic District | November 25, 1994 (#94001382) | Roughly bounded by Lafayette Street, Hartford Avenue, Alden Avenue, and Pleasant, High, Spring, South, and Prospect Streets; 41°59′59″N 72°36′06″W | Enfield | |
| 9 | Bigelow-Hartford Carpet Mills | Bigelow-Hartford Carpet Mills | March 10, 1983 (#83001256) | Main and Pleasant Streets; 42°00′01″N 72°36′11″W | Enfield | |
| 10 | Clarence A. Bingham School | Clarence A. Bingham School | May 8, 2017 (#100000953) | 3 North Street; 41°40′54″N 72°56′57″W | Bristol | |
| 11 | Selden Brewer House | Selden Brewer House | June 4, 1979 (#79002631) | Naubuc Avenue and Main Street; 41°44′06″N 72°37′41″W | East Hartford | |
| 12 | Bridge No. 455 | Bridge No. 455 | September 29, 2004 (#04001094) | CT 159 at Stony Brook; 41°57′30″N 72°37′40″W | Suffield | |
| 13 | Bristol Girls' Club | Bristol Girls' Club | June 3, 1987 (#87000347) | 47 Upson Street; 41°40′07″N 72°56′51″W | Bristol | |
| 14 | Bristol High School | Bristol High School | June 4, 2018 (#100002506) | 70 Memorial Boulevard; 41°40′11″N 72°56′19″W | Bristol | Most recently a middle school. |
| 15 | Broad Brook Company | Broad Brook Company | May 2, 1985 (#85000950) | Scott Road and Main Street; 41°54′58″N 72°32′53″W | East Windsor | |
| 16 | Brown Tavern | Brown Tavern | May 5, 1972 (#72001339) | George Washington Turnpike; 41°46′07″N 72°57′57″W | Burlington | |
| 17 | Bulkeley Bridge | Bulkeley Bridge | December 10, 1993 (#93001347) | Interstate 84 over the Connecticut River; 41°46′09″N 72°39′58″W | East Hartford | Extends into Hartford |
| 18 | Edward L. Burnham Farm | Edward L. Burnham Farm | April 12, 1982 (#82004436) | 580 Burnham Street West; 41°48′03″N 72°34′50″W | Manchester | |
| 19 | Burritt Hotel | Burritt Hotel | July 28, 1983 (#83001257) | 67 West Main Street; 41°40′04″N 72°47′01″W | New Britain | |
| 20 | Ernest R. Burwell House | Ernest R. Burwell House | August 18, 1992 (#92001009) | 161 Grove Street; 41°40′54″N 72°56′11″W | Bristol | |
| 21 | Roger Butler House | Roger Butler House | August 15, 1996 (#96000847) | 146 Jordan Lane; 41°43′24″N 72°40′17″W | Wethersfield | |
| 22 | Buttolph-Williams House | Buttolph-Williams House | November 24, 1968 (#68000048) | 249 Broad Street; 41°42′39″N 72°39′04″W | Wethersfield | Exemplifies traditional early New England design. |
| 23 | Canton Center Historic District | Canton Center Historic District | October 7, 1997 (#97000831) | Roughly along Barbourtown, East Mountain, Humphrey, West, and West Mountain Roads; 41°51′28″N 72°54′58″W | Canton | |
| 24 | Case Brothers Historic District | Case Brothers Historic District | June 30, 2009 (#09000468) | 680-728 Spring Street, 40 Glen Road, and rough boundaries of Case Mountain Recreation Area and Manchester Land; 41°45′46″N 72°29′20″W | Manchester | |
| 25 | Cedar Hill Cemetery | Cedar Hill Cemetery | April 28, 1997 (#97000333) | 453 Fairfield Avenue; 41°43′20″N 72°42′12″W | Newington and Wethersfield | Extends into Hartford |
| 26 | Central Avenue-Center Cemetery Historic District | Central Avenue-Center Cemetery Historic District | April 19, 1993 (#93000289) | Center Avenue from Main Street to Elm Street and Center Cemetery to the North; 41°46′09″N 72°38′29″W | East Hartford | |
| 27 | Cheney Brothers Historic District | Cheney Brothers Historic District | June 2, 1978 (#78002885) | Bounded by Hartford Road and Laurel, Spruce, and Lampfield Streets; 41°46′00″N 72°31′43″W | Manchester | A nineteenth century silk mill and traditional company town. |
| 28 | City Hall-Monument District | City Hall-Monument District | February 28, 1973 (#73001957) | West Main Street and Central Park; 41°40′05″N 72°46′59″W | New Britain | |
| 29 | Clark Farm Tenant House site | Clark Farm Tenant House site | January 31, 2002 (#01001554) | Address Restricted | East Granby | |
| 30 | Collinsville Historic District | Collinsville Historic District | June 23, 1976 (#76001994) | CT 179; 41°48′44″N 72°55′22″W | Canton | |
| 31 | Commercial Trust Company Building | Commercial Trust Company Building | March 17, 2009 (#09000141) | 55 West Main Street; 41°40′04″N 72°46′59″W | New Britain | |
| 32 | Congregational Church of Plainville | Congregational Church of Plainville | June 27, 2012 (#12000358) | 130 West Main Street; 41°40′12″N 72°52′27″W | Plainville | |
| 33 | Connecticut General Life Insurance Company Headquarters | Connecticut General Life Insurance Company Headquarters | January 27, 2010 (#09000324) | 900 Cottage Grove Road; 41°48′49″N 72°44′42″W | Bloomfield | |
| 34 | Copper Ledges and Chimney Crest | Copper Ledges and Chimney Crest | August 21, 1992 (#92001010) | Along Founders Drive between Bradley and Woodland Streets; 41°40′45″N 72°56′03″W | Bristol | |
| 35 | Frederick H. Cossitt Library | Frederick H. Cossitt Library | June 22, 1988 (#88000708) | 388 North Granby Road; 41°59′45″N 72°49′51″W | Granby | |
| 36 | Abraham Coult House | | August 11, 2000 (#00000834) | 1695 Hebron Avenue; 41°43′08″N 72°32′39″W | Glastonbury | |
| 37 | Gen. George Cowles House | Gen. George Cowles House | May 11, 1982 (#82004400) | 130 Main Street; 41°43′03″N 72°50′09″W | Farmington | |
| 38 | Whitfield Cowles House | Whitfield Cowles House | April 8, 2014 (#13000528) | 118 Spoonville Road; 41°54′05″N 72°44′45″W | East Granby | |
| 39 | Curtisville Historic District | Curtisville Historic District | December 14, 1992 (#92001638) | Roughly Pratt Street from Naubuc Avenue to the west of Main Street, also Parker Terrace; Parker Terrace and adjacent parts of Naubuc; 41°43′03″N 72°37′03″W | Glastonbury | |
| 40 | Robert and Julia Darling House | Robert and Julia Darling House | January 3, 1991 (#90002117) | 720 Hopmeadow Street; 41°52′20″N 72°48′10″W | Simsbury | |
| 41 | Silas Deane House | Silas Deane House | October 6, 1970 (#70000835) | 203 Main Street; 41°41′42″N 72°39′13″W | Wethersfield | Home of America's first foreign diplomat |
| 42 | Downtown Main Street Historic District | Downtown Main Street Historic District | December 20, 1996 (#96001464) | Roughly bounded by Main Street, Governor Street, Chapman Place, and Burnside Avenue; 41°46′20″N 72°38′31″W | East Hartford | |
| 43 | Downtown New Britain | Downtown New Britain | May 3, 2016 (#16000210) | Roughly bounded by CT 72, Main Street, Franklin Square, Whiting Street, Arch Street, and High Street; 41°39′41″N 72°46′47″W | New Britain | |
| 44 | Drake Hill Road Bridge | Drake Hill Road Bridge | July 19, 1984 (#84000999) | Old Bridge Road at the Farmington River; 41°52′06″N 72°48′01″W | Simsbury | |
| 45 | East Granby Historic District | East Granby Historic District | August 25, 1988 (#88001318) | Church and East Streets, Nicholson and Rainbow Roads, North Main, School and South Main Streets; 41°56′32″N 72°43′28″W | East Granby | |
| 46 | East Weatogue Historic District | East Weatogue Historic District | July 19, 1990 (#90001107) | Roughly properties on East Weatogue Street from just north of Riverside Drive to Hartford Road, and Folly Farm property to the south 41°50′51″N 72°47′58″W | Simsbury | |
| 47 | East Windsor Academy | East Windsor Academy | December 3, 1998 (#98000359) | 115 Scantic Road; 41°54′02″N 72°34′49″W | East Windsor | |
| 48 | East Windsor Hill Historic District | East Windsor Hill Historic District | May 30, 1986 (#86001208) | Roughly bounded by the Scantic River, John Fitch Boulevard, Sullivan Avenue, and the Connecticut River; 41°51′23″N 72°36′45″W | South Windsor | |
| 49 | Elm Street Historic District | Elm Street Historic District | April 13, 1998 (#98000358) | 18-191 Elm Street; 41°39′53″N 72°38′40″W | Rocky Hill | |
| 50 | Elmore Houses | Elmore Houses | August 23, 1985 (#85001832) | 78 and 87 Long Hill Road; 41°48′10″N 72°35′42″W | South Windsor | |
| 51 | Endee Manor Historic District | Endee Manor Historic District | February 29, 1996 (#96000027) | Roughly along Sherman, Mills and Putnam Streets; 41°40′44″N 72°57′28″W | Bristol | |
| 52 | Enfield Canal | Enfield Canal | April 22, 1976 (#76001998) | Along the Connecticut River from Windsor Locks north to Thompsonville; 41°57′00″N 72°37′10″W | Windsor Locks | |
| 53 | Enfield Carnegie Library | Enfield Carnegie Library | February 12, 2025 (#100011475) | 159 Pearl Street; 41°59′29″N 72°35′52″W | Enfield | |
| 54 | Enfield Historic District | Enfield Historic District | August 10, 1979 (#79002664) | 1106-1492 Enfield Street; 41°58′34″N 72°35′37″W | Enfield | |
| 55 | Enfield Shakers Historic District | Enfield Shakers Historic District | May 21, 1979 (#79002663) | Shaker, Taylor, and Cybulski Roads; 42°00′42″N 72°30′57″W | Enfield | |
| 56 | Enfield Town Meetinghouse | Enfield Town Meetinghouse | September 10, 1974 (#74002050) | Enfield Street at South Road; 41°58′37″N 72°35′33″W | Enfield | |
| 57 | Eno Memorial Hall | Eno Memorial Hall | April 2, 1993 (#93000210) | 754 Hopmeadow Street; 41°52′28″N 72°48′06″W | Simsbury | |
| 58 | Amos Eno House | Amos Eno House | April 3, 1975 (#75001935) | 731 Hopmeadow Street; 41°52′21″N 72°48′14″W | Simsbury | |
| 59 | Erwin Home for Worthy and Indigent Women | Erwin Home for Worthy and Indigent Women | April 12, 2002 (#02000332) | 140 Bassett Street; 41°39′26″N 72°46′48″W | New Britain | |
| 60 | Farmington Canal-New Haven and Northampton Canal | Farmington Canal-New Haven and Northampton Canal | September 12, 1985 (#85002664) | Roughly from Suffield in Hartford County to New Haven in New Haven County; 41°37′14″N 72°51′54″W | Avon, East Granby, Farmington, Granby, Plainville, Simsbury, Suffield | Extends into Southington and New Haven County. First a canal, later a railroad, and now a multi-use trail. |
| 61 | Farmington Historic District | Farmington Historic District | March 17, 1972 (#72001331) | Porter and Mountain Roads, Main and Garden Streets, Hatter's and Hillstead Lanes, and Farmington Avenue; 41°43′11″N 72°49′45″W | Farmington | |
| 62 | Federal Hill Historic District | Federal Hill Historic District | August 28, 1986 (#86001989) | Roughly bounded by Summer, Maple, Woodland, Goodwin, and High Streets; 41°40′35″N 72°56′27″W | Bristol | |
| 63 | Capt. Oliver Filley House | Capt. Oliver Filley House | May 15, 2007 (#07000420) | 130 Mountain Avenue; 41°50′05″N 72°45′44″W | Bloomfield | |
| 64 | First Church of Christ | First Church of Christ | May 15, 1975 (#75002056) | 75 Main Street; 41°43′14″N 72°49′47″W | Farmington | Church of the Amistad freed slaves. |
| 65 | First Congregational Church of East Hartford and Parsonage | First Congregational Church of East Hartford and Parsonage | March 25, 1982 (#82004398) | 829-837 Main Street; 41°46′08″N 72°38′41″W | East Hartford | |
| 66 | First Lutheran Church of the Reformation | First Lutheran Church of the Reformation | August 30, 2010 (#10000825) | 77 Franklin Square; 41°39′46″N 72°46′50″W | New Britain | |
| 67 | Forestville Passenger Station | Forestville Passenger Station | April 19, 1978 (#78002862) | 171 Central Street; 41°40′24″N 72°53′54″W | Forestville | |
| 68 | John Fuller House | John Fuller House | March 15, 1982 (#82004439) | 463 Halliday Avenue; 42°01′03″N 72°39′27″W | Suffield | |
| 69 | Garvan-Carroll Historic District | Garvan-Carroll Historic District | August 26, 1991 (#91001049) | Roughly bounded by South Prospect, Chapel and Main Streets, and Interstate 84; 41°46′01″N 72°38′52″W | East Hartford | |
| 70 | Francis Gillette House | Francis Gillette House | March 25, 1982 (#82004391) | 545 Bloomfield Avenue; 41°48′51″N 72°44′15″W | Bloomfield | |
| 71 | Gilman-Hayden House | Gilman-Hayden House | August 16, 1984 (#84001007) | 1871 Main Street; 41°47′30″N 72°38′01″W | East Hartford | |
| 72 | Glastonbury Historic District | Glastonbury Historic District | August 2, 1984 (#84001011) | Roughly Main Street from Hebron Avenue to Talcott Road; 41°42′09″N 72°36′34″W | Glastonbury | |
| 73 | Glastonbury-Rocky Hill Ferry Historic District | Glastonbury-Rocky Hill Ferry Historic District | September 21, 2005 (#05001046) | Roughly along Tryon Street, Ferry Lane and Glastonbury Avenue, Meadow and Riverview Roads; 41°39′46″N 72°37′19″W | Glastonbury | |
| 74 | Gothic Cottage | Gothic Cottage | February 25, 1982 (#82004441) | 1425 Mapleton Avenue; 42°01′04″N 72°37′17″W | Suffield | |
| 75 | Granby Center Historic District | Granby Center Historic District | October 17, 1985 (#85003149) | 3-8 East Granby Road, 2 Park Place, and 207-265 Salmon Brook Street South; 41°57′00″N 72°47′33″W | Granby | |
| 76 | Ebenezer Grant House | Ebenezer Grant House | September 19, 1977 (#77001408) | 1653 Main Street; 41°51′05″N 72°36′31″W | South Windsor | |
| 77 | Gridley-Parsons-Staples Homestead | Gridley-Parsons-Staples Homestead | July 30, 1981 (#81000537) | 1554 Farmington Avenue; 41°44′56″N 72°52′08″W | Farmington | |
| 78 | Dr. Elizur Hale House | Dr. Elizur Hale House | November 13, 1989 (#89001088) | 3181 Hebron Avenue; 41°42′29″N 72°28′44″W | Glastonbury | |
| 79 | Hart's Corner Historic District | Hart's Corner Historic District | July 8, 1987 (#87000351) | 247 Monce Road and 102 and 105 Stafford Road; 41°43′41″N 72°54′50″W | Burlington | |
| 80 | Hastings Hill Historic District | Hastings Hill Historic District | September 14, 1979 (#79002669) | 987-1308 Hill Street, 1242 Spruce Street, and 1085-1162 Russell Avenue; 42°00′35″N 72°40′38″W | Suffield | |
| 81 | Hatheway House | Hatheway House | August 6, 1975 (#75001934) | 55 South Main Street; 41°58′48″N 72°39′10″W | Suffield | |
| 82 | Samuel Hayes II House | Samuel Hayes II House | April 27, 1992 (#92000390) | 67 Barndoor Hills Road; 41°56′42″N 72°49′06″W | Granby | |
| 83 | Hazardville Historic District | Hazardville Historic District | February 19, 1980 (#80004061) | CT 190 and CT 192, Hazardville, Connecticut and Vicinity; 41°58′33″N 72°31′54″W | Enfield | |
| 84 | Heublein Tower | Heublein Tower | June 30, 1983 (#83001260) | Talcott Mountain State Park; 41°49′25″N 72°47′51″W | Simsbury | |
| 85 | Hill-Stead | Hill-Stead | July 17, 1991 (#91002056) | 35 Mountain Road; 41°43′13″N 72°49′09″W | Farmington | Colonial Revival house and art museum located in the Farmington Historic District |
| 86 | Hilltop Farm | Hilltop Farm | January 12, 2005 (#04001463) | 1550-1760 Mapleton Avenue; 42°01′30″N 72°36′50″W | Suffield | |
| 87 | Hitchcock-Schwarzmann Mill | Hitchcock-Schwarzmann Mill | September 13, 1977 (#77001409) | North of Burlington at Foote and Vineyard Roads; 41°46′54″N 72°57′42″W | Burlington | Main mill building demolished. |
| 88 | Judah Holcomb House | Judah Holcomb House | June 16, 1988 (#88000755) | 257 North Granby Road; 41°58′50″N 72°49′08″W | Granby | The house experienced a significant fire and was subsequently demolished. The doorway survived the fire and is now at Historic Deerfield. |
| 89 | Nathaniel Holcomb III House | Nathaniel Holcomb III House | April 29, 1982 (#82004486) | 45 Bushy Hill Road; 41°57′00″N 72°48′40″W | Granby | |
| 90 | John Hollister House | John Hollister House | November 7, 1972 (#72001329) | 14 Tryon Street; 41°40′01″N 72°36′32″W | Glastonbury | |
| 91 | Francis H. Holmes House | Francis H. Holmes House | June 28, 1984 (#84001014) | 349 Rocky Hill Avenue; 41°39′14″N 72°45′34″W | New Britain | |
| 92 | Henry Hooker House | Henry Hooker House | November 29, 1978 (#78002867) | 111 High Road; 41°38′41″N 72°47′22″W | Berlin | |
| 93 | Hubbard Park | Hubbard Park | December 15, 1997 (#97001466) | Roughly bounded by West Main Street, Interstate 691, CT 66, Reservoir Avenue, Edgewood Drive; 41°33′45″N 72°50′05″W | Berlin | A park partly in Berlin, Southington, and Meriden. |
| 94 | John Humphrey House | John Humphrey House | November 15, 1990 (#90001755) | 115 East Weatogue Street; 41°51′48″N 72°47′43″W | Simsbury | |
| 95 | William Jerome I House | William Jerome I House | June 2, 1987 (#87000792) | 367 Jerome Avenue; 41°41′59″N 72°55′46″W | Bristol | |
| 96 | Gen. Martin Kellogg House | Gen. Martin Kellogg House | October 1, 1987 (#87001770) | 679 Willard Avenue; 41°41′53″N 72°44′04″W | Newington | The home of General Martin Kellog III, also known as the Kellogg-Eddy House |
| 97 | Enoch Kelsey House | Enoch Kelsey House | June 28, 1982 (#82004437) | 1702 Main Street; 41°41′07″N 72°43′17″W | Newington | |
| 98 | Ezekiel Kelsey House | Ezekiel Kelsey House | September 16, 1977 (#77001410) | 429 Beckley Road; 41°37′43″N 72°43′24″W | Berlin | |
| 99 | Kensington Grammar School-Jean E. Hooker High School | Kensington Grammar School-Jean E. Hooker High School | June 27, 2012 (#12000360) | 462 Alling Street; 41°38′02″N 72°46′15″W | Berlin | Demolished. |
| 100 | Kensington Soldier's Monument | Kensington Soldier's Monument | July 3, 2013 (#13000456) | 312 Percival Avenue; 41°37′22″N 72°46′59″W | Berlin | |
| 101 | Kimberly Mansion | Kimberly Mansion | September 17, 1974 (#74002178) | 1625 Main Street; 41°41′22″N 72°36′26″W | Glastonbury | Home of Abby and Julia Evelina Smith, suffragists who fought the town of Glastonbury and won. |
| 102 | King's Field House | King's Field House | March 11, 1982 (#82004440) | 827 North Street; 42°00′26″N 72°38′42″W | Suffield | |
| 103 | Alexander King House | Alexander King House | April 26, 1976 (#76001993) | 232 South Main Street; 41°58′31″N 72°39′12″W | Suffield | |
| 104 | Landers, Frary and Clark Ellis Street Plant Historic District | | August 1, 2022 (#100007948) | 321 and 322 Ellis Street; 41°39′29″N 72°46′10″W | New Britain | |
| 105 | Lewis-Zukowski House | Lewis-Zukowski House | February 21, 1990 (#90000147) | 1095 South Grand Street; 41°57′41″N 72°42′41″W | Suffield | |
| 106 | Main Street Historic District | Main Street Historic District | August 15, 1995 (#95001006) | Roughly Main Street from School Street to Summer Street and adjacent areas of Prospect Street; 41°40′19″N 72°56′35″W | Bristol | |
| 107 | Main Street Historic District | Main Street Historic District | April 18, 1996 (#96000428) | Roughly Main Street from Center Street to Eldridge Street; 41°46′16″N 72°31′18″W | Manchester | |
| 108 | Manchester Historic District | Manchester Historic District | August 2, 2000 (#00000857) | Roughly bounded by Center Spring Park, Main Street, Interstate 384, and Campfield Road; 41°46′12″N 72°31′42″W | Manchester | |
| 109 | Marlborough Congregational Church | Marlborough Congregational Church | December 10, 1993 (#93001346) | 35 South Main Street; 41°37′44″N 72°27′19″W | Marlborough | |
| 110 | Marlborough House | Marlborough House | September 2, 1993 (#93000906) | 226 Grove Street; 41°40′52″N 72°56′02″W | Bristol | |
| 111 | Marlborough Tavern | Marlborough Tavern | December 6, 1978 (#78002866) | East Hampton Road and South Main Street; 41°37′52″N 72°27′35″W | Marlborough | |
| 112 | Masonic Temple | Masonic Temple | July 21, 1995 (#95000864) | 265 West Main Street; 41°39′57″N 72°47′27″W | New Britain | |
| 113 | Massacoe Forest Pavilion | Massacoe Forest Pavilion | September 4, 1986 (#86001731) | Stratton Brook State Park; 41°51′49″N 72°50′10″W | Simsbury | |
| 114 | Melrose | Melrose | August 26, 2010 (#10000577) | Broad Brook and Melrose Road; 41°56′15″N 72°31′38″W | East Windsor | |
| 115 | Melrose Road Bridge | Melrose Road Bridge | August 5, 1999 (#99000922) | Melrose Road over the Scantic River; 41°56′18″N 72°32′51″W | East Windsor | |
| 116 | Memorial Hall | Memorial Hall | June 2, 1987 (#87000802) | Junction of South Main and Elm Streets; 41°55′29″N 72°37′38″W | Windsor Locks | |
| 117 | J. R. Montgomery Company Industrial Complex | J. R. Montgomery Company Industrial Complex | December 29, 2017 (#100001915) | 25 Canal Bank Road; 41°55′46″N 72°37′36″W | Windsor Locks | |
| 118 | Naubuc Avenue-Broad Street Historic District | Naubuc Avenue-Broad Street Historic District | December 4, 1998 (#98001439) | Roughly along Broad Street and Naubuc Avenue; 41°43′48″N 72°37′38″W | East Hartford | |
| 119 | New Britain Opera House | New Britain Opera House | October 7, 1977 (#77001421) | 466-468 Main Street; 41°40′14″N 72°46′55″W | New Britain | Demolished. |
| 120 | New Britain Public High School Campus | New Britain Public High School Campus | March 23, 2015 (#15000101) | 50 Bassett Street & 161 South Main Street; 41°39′38″N 72°46′48″W | New Britain | Converted to residences. |
| 121 | New Haven District Campground | New Haven District Campground | May 19, 1980 (#80004065) | Camp Street and Gladding Avenue; 41°41′10″N 72°53′23″W | Plainville | |
| 122 | Newington Junction North Historic District | Newington Junction North Historic District | June 2, 1987 (#86003465) | 268-319 Willard Avenue; 41°43′05″N 72°44′15″W | Newington | |
| 123 | Newington Junction Railroad Depot | Newington Junction Railroad Depot | December 22, 1986 (#86003478) | Willard Avenue and West Hill Road; 41°42′55″N 72°44′13″W | Newington | |
| 124 | Newington Junction South Historic District | Newington Junction South Historic District | June 2, 1987 (#86003462) | 268-319 Willard Avenue; 41°42′41″N 72°44′15″W | Newington | |
| 125 | Newington Junction West Historic District | Newington Junction West Historic District | June 2, 1987 (#86003464) | 268-319 Willard Avenue; 41°42′54″N 72°44′21″W | Newington | |
| 126 | Newington VA Hospital Historic District | | July 5, 2022 (#100007860) | 555 Willard Avenue; 41°42′08″N 72°44′07″W | Newington | |
| 127 | Charles H. Norton House | Charles H. Norton House | May 11, 1976 (#76002139) | 132 Redstone Hill; 41°39′32″N 72°53′06″W | Plainville | Home of the inventor of precision grinding equipment. |
| 128 | Old Farm Schoolhouse | Old Farm Schoolhouse | October 18, 1972 (#72001340) | Junction of Park Avenue and School Street; 41°49′25″N 72°42′32″W | Bloomfield | |
| 129 | Old Newgate Prison | Old Newgate Prison | October 15, 1970 (#70000839) | Newgate Road; 41°57′43″N 72°44′44″W | East Granby | Colonial prison; loyalists were held here during the American Revolutionary War |
| 130 | Old Wethersfield Historic District | Old Wethersfield Historic District | December 29, 1970 (#70000719) | Bounded by Hartford, Railroad Tracks, Interstate 91, and Rocky Hill; 41°42′32″N 72°39′23″W | Wethersfield | |
| 131 | Clara T. O'Connell School | Clara T. O'Connell School | May 8, 2017 (#100000954) | 122 Park Street; 41°40′20″N 72°57′16″W | Bristol | |
| 132 | Pequabuck Bridge | Pequabuck Bridge | July 19, 1984 (#84001049) | Meadow Road at the Pequabuck River; 41°42′59″N 72°50′25″W | Farmington | |
| 133 | Capt. Elisha Phelps House | Capt. Elisha Phelps House | September 22, 1972 (#72001345) | 800 Hopmeadow Street; 41°52′34″N 72°48′05″W | Simsbury | |
| 134 | Ezekiel Phelps House | Ezekiel Phelps House | February 25, 1982 (#82004396) | 38 Holcomb Street; 41°56′36″N 72°44′47″W | East Granby | |
| 135 | Pine Grove Historic District | Pine Grove Historic District | February 11, 1980 (#80004066) | West Avon and Harris Roads; 41°46′09″N 72°51′25″W | Avon | |
| 136 | David Pinney House and Barn | David Pinney House and Barn | July 25, 1977 (#77001415) | 58 West Street; 41°55′57″N 72°38′24″W | Windsor Locks | Now the Noden-Reed Museum. |
| 137 | Pitkin Glassworks Ruin | Pitkin Glassworks Ruin | April 9, 1979 (#79002628) | Putnam and Parker Streets; 41°46′36″N 72°30′15″W | Manchester | |
| 138 | John Robbins House | John Robbins House | September 20, 1988 (#88001526) | 262 Old Main Street; 41°40′42″N 72°38′43″W | Rocky Hill | |
| 139 | Unni Robbins II House | Unni Robbins II House | September 21, 2005 (#05001049) | 1692 Main Street; 41°41′09″N 72°43′17″W | Newington | |
| 140 | Rockwell Park | Rockwell Park | May 21, 1987 (#87000788) | Dutton Avenue and Jacobs Street; 41°40′26″N 72°57′43″W | Bristol | |
| 141 | Rocky Hill Center Historic District | Rocky Hill Center Historic District | March 9, 2007 (#07000111) | Roughly bounded by Old Main, Pratt, and Washington Streets, Glastonbury Avenue, and Riverview Road; 41°39′54″N 72°38′06″W | Rocky Hill | |
| 142 | Rocky Hill Congregational Church | Rocky Hill Congregational Church | May 7, 1982 (#82004438) | 805-817 Old Main Street; 41°39′56″N 72°38′21″W | Rocky Hill | |
| 143 | Rowe and Weed Houses | Rowe and Weed Houses | January 18, 1978 (#78002860) | 208 Salmon Brook Street; 41°56′45″N 72°47′27″W | Granby | |
| 144 | St. John's Episcopal Church | St. John's Episcopal Church | November 28, 1983 (#83003567) | 1160 Main Street; 41°46′25″N 72°38′27″W | East Hartford | |
| 145 | St. John's Episcopal Church | St. John's Episcopal Church | April 27, 1982 (#82004442) | 92 Main Street; 41°55′43″N 72°37′06″W | East Windsor | |
| 146 | St. Mary's Parochial School | St. Mary's Parochial School | April 3, 1991 (#91000364) | Beaver Street South of Broad Street; 41°40′18″N 72°46′58″W | New Britain | |
| 147 | Shade Swamp Shelter | Shade Swamp Shelter | September 4, 1986 (#86001746) | U.S. Route 6 East of New Britain Avenue; 41°42′15″N 72°51′35″W | Farmington | |
| 148 | Simeon North Factory Site | Simeon North Factory Site | August 18, 1990 (#90001158) | Address Restricted | Berlin | |
| 149 | Simsbury Bank and Trust Company Building | Simsbury Bank and Trust Company Building | November 20, 1986 (#86003323) | 760 Hopmeadow Street; 41°52′31″N 72°48′06″W | Simsbury | |
| 150 | Simsbury Center Historic District | Simsbury Center Historic District | April 12, 1996 (#96000356) | Roughly Hopmeadow Street from West Street to Massaco Street; 41°52′31″N 72°48′11″W | Simsbury | |
| 151 | Simsbury Railroad Depot | Simsbury Railroad Depot | March 26, 1976 (#76001997) | Railroad Avenue at Station Street; 41°52′27″N 72°48′02″W | Simsbury | |
| 152 | Simsbury Townhouse | Simsbury Townhouse | April 2, 1993 (#93000209) | 695 Hopmeadow Street; 41°52′18″N 72°48′17″W | Simsbury | |
| 153 | Sloper-Wesoly House | Sloper-Wesoly House | January 7, 1999 (#98001577) | 27 Grove Hill Street; 41°40′00″N 72°47′30″W | New Britain | |
| 154 | South Congregational Church | South Congregational Church | April 6, 1990 (#89000930) | 90 Main Street; 41°39′54″N 72°46′56″W | New Britain | |
| 155 | South End Historic District | South End Historic District | January 19, 2001 (#00001625) | Roughly bounded by East Road, Willis Street, George Street, and South Street; 41°39′55″N 72°56′33″W | Bristol | |
| 156 | South Glastonbury Historic District | South Glastonbury Historic District | November 23, 1984 (#84000250) | High, Hopewell, Main, and Water Streets; also 999-1417 and 1032-1420 Main Street, 6 and 7 Chestnut Hill Road; 41°39′59″N 72°36′15″W | Glastonbury | Second set of boundaries represent a boundary increase of September 24, 2009 |
| 157 | Southwest District School | Southwest District School | July 24, 1992 (#92000904) | 430 Simsbury Road; 41°49′04″N 72°46′02″W | Bloomfield | |
| 158 | Stanley-Whitman House | Stanley-Whitman House | October 15, 1966 (#66000882) | 37 High Street; 41°43′16″N 72°49′32″W | Farmington | Classic seventeenth-century New England saltbox. |
| 159 | Suffield Historic District | Suffield Historic District | September 25, 1979 (#79003750) | Runs along North and South Main Street; 41°58′51″N 72°39′06″W | Suffield | |
| 160 | Tariffville Historic District | Tariffville Historic District | April 2, 1993 (#93000173) | Roughly bounded by Winthrop Street, Main Street, Mountain Road, Laurel Hill Road, and Elm Street; 41°54′36″N 72°45′53″W | Simsbury | |
| 161 | Tephereth Israel Synagogue | Tephereth Israel Synagogue | May 11, 1995 (#95000576) | 76 Winter Street; 41°40′19″N 72°46′44″W | New Britain | |
| 162 | Terry's Plain Historic District | Terry's Plain Historic District | December 10, 1993 (#93001417) | Roughly bounded by Pharos, Quarry, and Terry's Plain Roads, and the Farmington River; 41°53′01″N 72°47′05″W | Simsbury | |
| 163 | Terry-Hayden House | Terry-Hayden House | March 25, 1982 (#82004393) | 125-135 Middle Street; 41°39′57″N 72°55′17″W | Bristol | |
| 164 | William H. Thompson Farmstead | William H. Thompson Farmstead | April 18, 2003 (#03000234) | 215 and 219 Melrose Road; 41°56′16″N 72°31′22″W | East Windsor | |
| 165 | Town Bridge | Town Bridge | August 5, 1999 (#99000923) | Town Bridge Road over the Farmington River; 41°49′28″N 72°55′43″W | Canton | |
| 166 | Townsend G. Treadway House | Townsend G. Treadway House | December 19, 1991 (#91001871) | 100 Oakland Street; 41°40′51″N 72°56′10″W | Bristol | |
| 167 | Treadwell House | Treadwell House | April 27, 1982 (#82004395) | 253 Spielman Highway; 41°46′08″N 72°57′52″W | Burlington | |
| 168 | Trinity Methodist Episcopal Church | Trinity Methodist Episcopal Church | July 21, 2007 (#07000697) | 69 Main Street; 41°39′56″N 72°46′51″W | New Britain | |
| 169 | Tunxis Forest Headquarters House | | September 4, 1986 (#86001759) | North Hollow Road CT 20; 42°00′51″N 72°54′58″W | Hartland | |
| 170 | Tunxis Forest Ski Cabin | Tunxis Forest Ski Cabin | September 5, 1986 (#86001761) | Western End of Balance Rock Road; 42°00′32″N 72°55′47″W | Hartland | |
| 171 | Tunxis Hose Firehouse | Tunxis Hose Firehouse | July 28, 1983 (#83001266) | Lovely Street and Farmington Avenue; 41°45′31″N 72°53′14″W | Farmington | |
| 172 | Union Village Historic District | Union Village Historic District | August 6, 2002 (#02000831) | Roughly bounded by Union Pond, Oakland Street, railroad right-of-way, Marble Street, and the Hockanum River; 41°47′47″N 72°31′43″W | Manchester | |
| 173 | US Post Office-Manchester Main | US Post Office-Manchester Main | January 21, 1986 (#86000127) | 491 Main Street; 41°46′35″N 72°31′21″W | Manchester | Now the Weiss Center, housing municipal offices |
| 174 | Viets' Tavern | Viets' Tavern | February 23, 1972 (#72001338) | Newgate Road; 41°57′43″N 72°44′42″W | East Granby | |
| 175 | Walnut Hill District | Walnut Hill District | September 2, 1975 (#75001936) | Irregular pattern roughly bounded by Winthrup, Arch, and Lake Streets, and Walnut Hill Park; 41°39′51″N 72°47′02″W | New Britain | |
| 176 | Walnut Hill Park | Walnut Hill Park | November 30, 1982 (#82001000) | West Main Street; 41°39′43″N 72°47′31″W | New Britain | |
| 177 | Washington School | Washington School | July 19, 1984 (#84001053) | 370 High Street; 41°40′40″N 72°47′18″W | New Britain | Now used as apartments |
| 178 | Joseph Webb House | Joseph Webb House | October 15, 1966 (#66000885) | 211 Main Street; 41°42′42″N 72°39′13″W | Wethersfield | Site of the American Revolutionary War conference between General George Washington and Rochambeau planning for the Siege of Yorktown |
| 179 | Gideon Welles House | Gideon Welles House | October 6, 1970 (#70000697) | 17 Hebron Avenue; 41°42′45″N 72°36′29″W | Glastonbury | |
| 180 | Welles-Shipman-Ward House | Welles-Shipman-Ward House | September 19, 1977 (#77001418) | 972 Main Street; 41°40′08″N 72°36′07″W | Glastonbury | |
| 181 | West End Historic District | West End Historic District | December 24, 1998 (#98001542) | Roughly along Park Place, Vine, Forest, Lincoln, Liberty, Sunnyledge, Hart, Lexington, Murray, and Woodbine Streets; 41°39′40″N 72°47′42″W | New Britain | |
| 182 | West End Library | West End Library | April 25, 2000 (#00000369) | 15 School Street; 41°45′29″N 72°53′19″W | Farmington | |
| 183 | West Granby Historic District | West Granby Historic District | May 1, 1992 (#92000385) | Broad Hill, Hartland, West Granby and Simsbury Roads, and Day Street South; 41°56′48″N 72°50′19″W | Granby | |
| 184 | John Wiard House | John Wiard House | March 25, 1982 (#82004394) | Spielman Highway; 41°46′33″N 72°58′50″W | Burlington | |
| 185 | Willard Homestead | Willard Homestead | December 22, 1986 (#86003461) | 372 Willard Avenue; 41°42′30″N 72°44′10″W | Newington | |
| 186 | Austin F. Williams Carriagehouse and House | Austin F. Williams Carriagehouse and House | August 5, 1998 (#98001190) | 127 Main Street; 41°43′21″N 72°49′41″W | Farmington | Temporary quarters for the Amistad Africans, and a "station" on the Underground Railroad |
| 187 | J. B. Williams Co. Historic District | J. B. Williams Co. Historic District | April 7, 1983 (#83001268) | Hubbard, Williams, and Willieb Streets; 41°42′08″N 72°35′49″W | Glastonbury | |
| 188 | Windsor Farms Historic District | Windsor Farms Historic District | April 11, 1986 (#86000723) | Roughly bounded by Strong Road, U.S. Route 5, Interstate 291, and the Connecticut River; 41°49′22″N 72°37′35″W | South Windsor | Encompasses the historic center of South Windsor. |
| 189 | Windsor Locks Passenger Station | Windsor Locks Passenger Station | September 2, 1975 (#75001937) | South Main Street at Stanton Road; 41°56′01″N 72°37′39″W | Windsor Locks | |
| 190 | Woodbridge Farmstead | Woodbridge Farmstead | August 5, 1999 (#99000925) | 495 Middle Turnpike East; 41°47′05″N 72°30′01″W | Manchester | |
| 191 | Worthington Ridge Historic District | Worthington Ridge Historic District | July 13, 1989 (#89000925) | Roughly Worthington Ridge from Mill Street to Sunset Lane; 41°37′06″N 72°44′49″W | Berlin | |

== Former listings ==
| | Name on the Register | Image | Date listed | Date removed | Location | City or town | Description |
|---|---|---|---|---|---|---|---|
| 1 | Hanna's Block | | September 14, 1972 (#72001568) | January 17, 1973 | 432 Main Street; 41°17′00″N 73°13′03″W | New Britain | Demolished |

== See also ==
- List of National Historic Landmarks in Connecticut
- National Register of Historic Places listings in Connecticut
