= Garvan-Carroll Historic District =

Historic district in Connecticut, United States

- U.S. National Register of Historic Places
- U.S. Historic district
- Location within Connecticut Location within the United States
- Location: Roughly bounded by South Prospect, Chapel and Main Streets and Interstate 84, East Hartford, Connecticut
- Coordinates: 41°46′1″N 72°38′52″W
- Area: 25 acres (10 ha)
- Architectural style: Colonial Revival, Italianate, Queen Anne
- MPS: East Hartford MPS
- NRHP reference No.: 91001049
- Added to NRHP: August 26, 1991

The Garvan-Carroll Historic District encompasses a primarily residential area near the center of East Hartford, Connecticut. Located just southwest of its Main Street Downtown on South Prospect and Garvan Streets, and Carroll and Tower Roads, this area retains a high concentration of residential architecture built mainly between 1890 and the 1920s. It was listed on the National Register of Historic Places in 1991.

== Description and history ==
East Hartford was for much of the 19th century a largely agricultural community, with some industry powered by the Hockanum River. Improving transportation networks led to its development as a residential suburb of Hartford, located just across the Connecticut River to the west. In 1892 trolley service was inaugurated between to the two communities. Businessman Patrick Garvan sensed a development opportunity, and bought a parcel of farmland, which he subdivided to build housing for local businesspeople and commuters to Hartford. He laid out Garvan Street, which was the first street in the district to be developed. Chapel Street, South Prospect, and Carroll and Tower Roads followed in the early decades of the 20th century, developed in part by Garvan and in part by the Carrolls, builders who were related to his wife.

The historic district is broadly bounded on the east by Main Street, the south by Interstate 84, the west by the highway's Governor Street exit ramps, and the north by Connecticut Boulevard. It includes no buildings on these streets, including only the densely built one and two-family houses contained on the streets within those bounds. The houses are mainly of wood-frame construction, and are in a diversity of styles, ranging from the Queen Anne to the Craftsman and American Foursquare. Houses are generally placed at uniform setbacks on each street, although lot widths and depths sometimes vary. Many houses have early garages or carriage houses, a nod to the increasing importance of the automobile in the years after they were built.

== See also ==
- National Register of Historic Places listings in Hartford County, Connecticut
