= Marlborough House (Bristol, Connecticut) =

Historic house in Connecticut, United States

- U.S. National Register of Historic Places
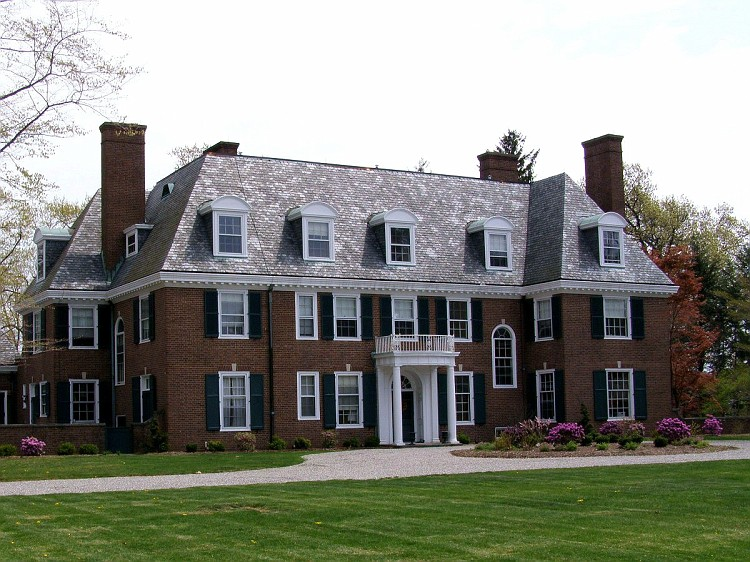

- Location within Connecticut Location within the United States
- Location: 226 Grove Street, Bristol, Connecticut
- Coordinates: 41.68149°N 72.93336°W
- Area: 2.7 acres (1.1 ha)
- Built: 1929
- Built by: Torrington Building Co.
- Architect: Dana, Richard Henry
- Architectural style: Late 19th And 20th Century Revivals
- NRHP reference No.: 93000906
- Added to NRHP: September 2, 1993

Marlborough House is a historic private residence at 226 Grove Street in Bristol, Connecticut. Built in 1929 for a local businessman, it is a prominent local example of Georgian Revival architecture. It was listed on the National Register of Historic Places in 1993.

== Description and history ==
Marlborough House stands in a residential area on the eastern side of Bristol's Federal Hill neighborhood, on the south side of Grove Street east of its junction with Bradley Street. It is a 2 1/2-story brick building with irregular shape, and is covered by a steeply pitched truncated hip roof. It has a basically rectangular main block, from which there are projections at the southern end of the (main) west facade, and at the eastern end of the north facade. The latter is attached to a three-bay period garage with similar styling. The west facade has the main entrance near its center, sheltered by an elliptical portico supported by Doric columns and flanked by Doric pilasters. The interior is richly decorated, with marble flooring in the entry hall, and fine woodwork in its public spaces.

The house was designed by Richard Henry Dana and built in 1929 for Edward Ingraham, whose family were leaders in the locally significant clockmaking industry. Ingraham was president of the E. Ingraham Company, founded by his great-grandfather in 1835, and under his leadership it became one of the largest makers of clocks and watches. His house is one of Bristol's largest and most elaborate examples of Georgian Revival architecture.

== See also ==
- National Register of Historic Places listings in Hartford County, Connecticut
