= Washington School (New Britain, Connecticut) =

- U.S. National Register of Historic Places
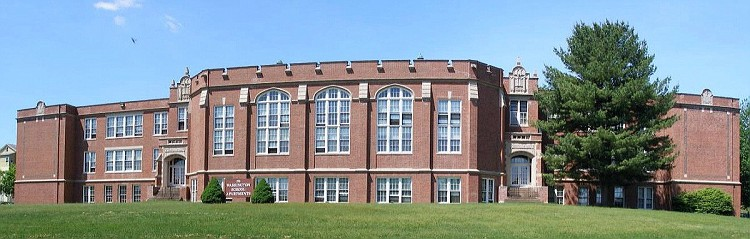

- Location within Connecticut Location within the United States
- Location: 370 High Street, New Britain, Connecticut
- Coordinates: 41°40′40″N 72°47′18″W
- Area: 3.3 acres (1.3 ha)
- Built: 1922
- Architect: Perry, Delbert K.
- Architectural style: Late Gothic Revival
- NRHP reference No.: 84001053
- Added to NRHP: July 19, 1984

The Washington School is a historic former school building at 370 High Street in New Britain, Connecticut. Now the Washington School Apartments, it was built in 1922, and is one of the city's most architecturally prominent schools of the period. It was listed on the National Register of Historic Places in 1984.

== Description and history ==
The former Washington School is located north of downtown New Britain, near the city's geographic center between High Street and Washington Park in a densely built residential neighborhood. The school is a broad two-story brick structure with Gothic Revival styling. It is divided into three sections, with a central projection flanked by wings. The central portion has five bays articulated by buttresses, with the center three filled with two-story segmented-arch windows three double-sashes wide and two high. The outer two bays have rectangular window bays that are smaller, with keystones at the top. The sides of the projection are angled and without windows, and it is topped by a crenellated parapet. The main entrances are in the wings immediately adjacent, recessed under segmented arches. The wings each extend to pavilions with no windows on the front facade.

The school was built in 1922, a time when the city was experiencing a significant population boom. The building was designed by Delbert K. Perry, a prominent local architect, its design following the then-current standards for schools, including generous natural light for classrooms, and it was laid out to take advantage of the "platoon system" of class organization, in which classrooms are dedicated to specific subjects, and students move around between them. The school's elaborate exterior was criticized, leading to local legislation limiting such ornamentation on future school buildings.

== See also ==
- National Register of Historic Places listings in Hartford County, Connecticut
