= Curtisville Historic District =

Historic district in Connecticut, United States

- U.S. National Register of Historic Places
- U.S. Historic district
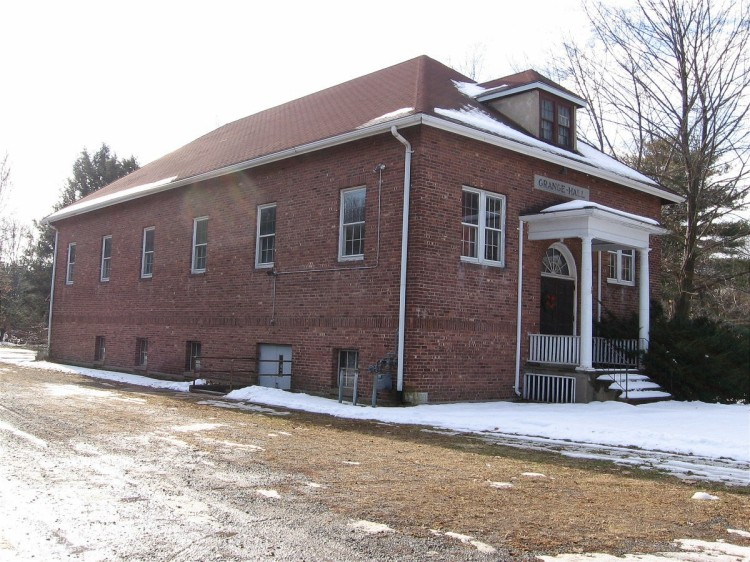
- Grange Hall, Curtisville

- Location within Connecticut Location within the United States
- Location: Roughly, Pratt Street from Naubuc Avenue to West of Main Street, also Parker Terrace, Parker Terrace adjacent parts of Naubuc, Glastonbury, Connecticut
- Coordinates: 41°43′3″N 72°37′3″W
- Area: 90 acres (36 ha)
- Architectural style: Colonial Revival, Mid 19th Century Revival, Late Victorian
- NRHP reference No.: 92001638
- Added to NRHP: December 14, 1992

The Curtisville Historic District encompasses a predominantly residential area along Naubuc Avenue and Pratt Streets in northwestern Glastonbury, Connecticut. Developed mainly in the 19th century, it illustrates the coexistence of agricultural and industrial pursuits in a single village area, mixing worker housing, former farm properties, and a small mill complex. The district was listed on the National Register of Historic Places in 1992.

== Description and history ==
Curtisville is located in Glastonbury's northwest corner, between Main Street to the east and the Connecticut River to the west. It is divided by Salmon Brook, a tributary of the river, and has two nearly discontiguous segments along Pratt Street and Naubuc Avenue north of the brook, and Naubuc Avenue and Parker Terrace to its south. Most of the buildings in the district are residences, dating from the late 18th to early 20th centuries. The largest number were built as worker housing in the 19th century, and are in vernacular forms with Federal and Greek Revival styling. There are some late examples of houses built for area tobacco farmers as well, including an early 20th-century Foursquare house on Pratt Street. Other distinctive houses are an Italianate villa built by a member of the Welles family who operated the mill, and a Gothic Revival cottage built for a mill supervisor. Off Parker Terrace is a small complex with several brick mill buildings, the major ones built around 1870.

The Curtisville area was one of the first parts of Glastonbury to be settled by English colonists, who had been using its riverfront meadows since the 17th century. Early land use in the area divided the area into narrow strips fronting on the river, with houses located on the terrace facing what is now Main Street. Salmon Brook was recognized as a source of water power in the colonial period, but its industrial development did not begin until the 1840s, when Oswin Welles began the manufacture of wooden wares and cigars. Brothers Frederick and Joseph Curtis established a major silver plating factory on the south bank of the brook around that time. Their endeavour was underfinanced and failed around 1860. The property was taken over by Thomas Vail, who manufactured rifles and single-shot pistols during the American Civil War. The property returned to silver plating when his business failed after the war ended. Tobacco continued to be a mainstay of agriculture in the area, and there was regular ferry and barge service at a wharf at the end of Pratt Street.

== See also ==
- National Register of Historic Places listings in Hartford County, Connecticut
