= Erwin Home for Worthy and Indigent Women =

- U.S. National Register of Historic Places
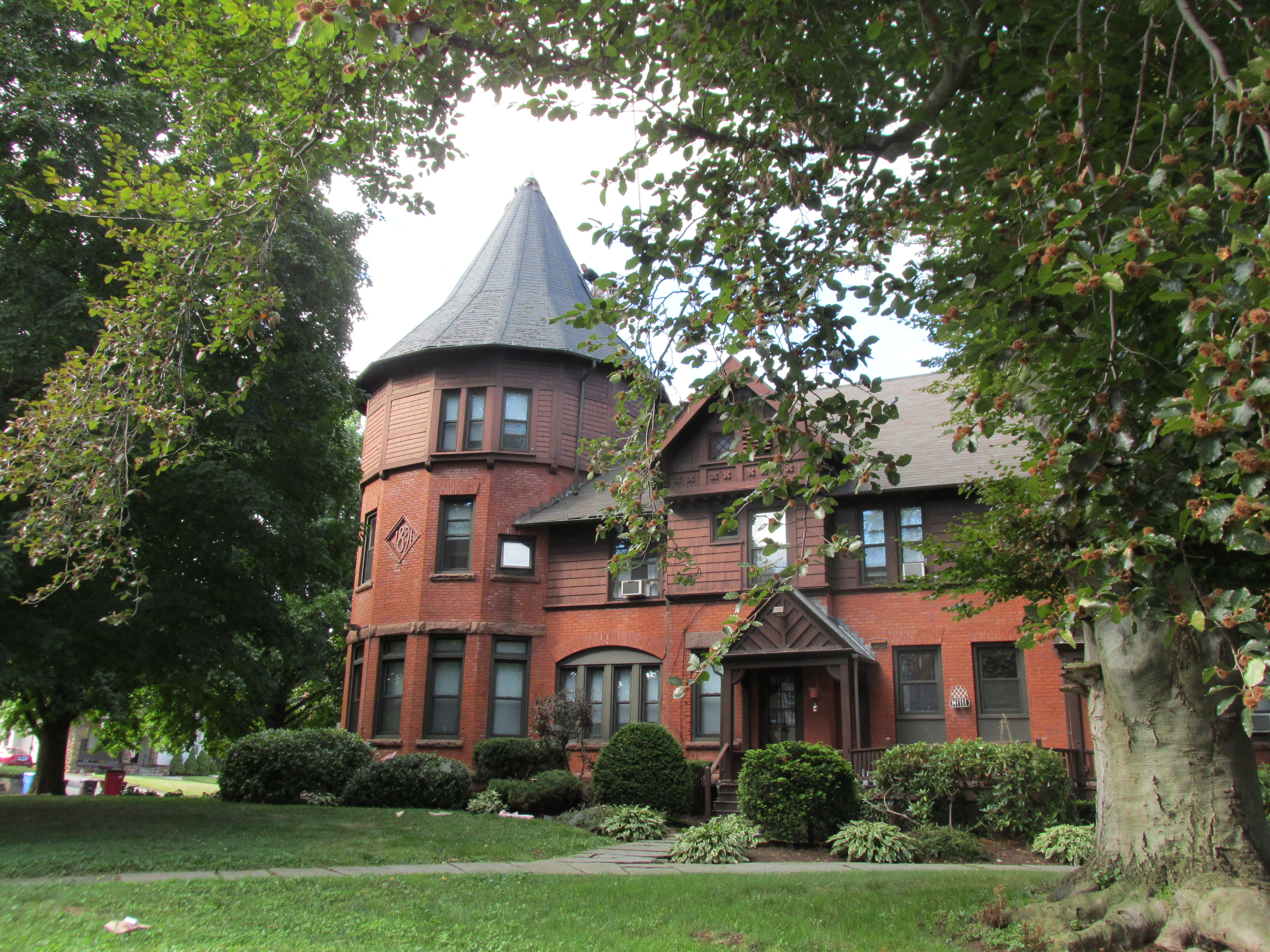
- 140 Bassett Street

- Location within Connecticut Location within the United States
- Location: 140 Bassett Street, New Britain, Connecticut
- Coordinates: 41°39′26″N 72°46′48″W
- Area: 2.5 acres (1.0 ha)
- Built: 1891
- Architect: Cook, Hapgood, & Co.; Hapgood & Hapgood, et al.
- Architectural style: Queen Anne
- NRHP reference No.: 02000332
- Added to NRHP: April 12, 2002

The Erwin Home, originally the Erwin Home for Worthy and Indigent Women, is a charitable organization providing housing for women of limited means in New Britain, Connecticut. Managed by the South Church of New Britain, it operates a number of apartment houses between Bassett Street and Cornelius Way. It was founded in 1885 with a bequest from local businessman and philanthropist Cornelius Erwin. Its original main building is listed on the National Register of Historic Places for its distinctive Queen Anne architecture.

== Description and history ==
The Erwin Home is located south of downtown New Britain, on an entire city block bounded by Edson, Bassett, and Ellis Streets, and Cornelius Way. The complex includes the original main building, which has been repeatedly enlarged and now houses 66 units for single women, and a series of additional buildings which are designed for single women with children.

The organization's articles of incorporation are dated July 6, 1893. It was funded by a bequest from Cornelius Erwin, who died in 1885, which provided for the establishment of homes for "worthy women of limited means". Erwin was a prominent local businessman and a member of the South Church, to whose administration he left the bequest. The first portion of the main building, with its distinctive Gothic Queen Anne turret, opened its doors in 1892. It underwent enlargements in a stylistically similar manner in 1894 and 1914, and was enlarged to its present U shape by further additions in the 1970s. In the 21st century it acquired further properties for supporting women with children.

When the home opened its doors, rents were fixed at $2/month.

== See also ==
- National Register of Historic Places listings in Hartford County, Connecticut
