= Townsend G. Treadway House =

Historic house in Connecticut, United States

- U.S. National Register of Historic Places
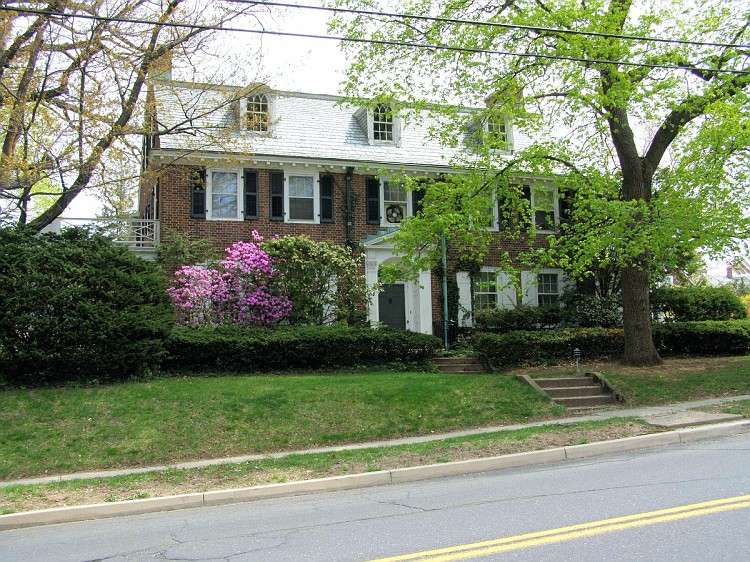

- Location within Connecticut Location within the United States
- Location: 100 Oakland Street, Bristol, Connecticut
- Coordinates: 41°40′52.7″N 72°56′9″W
- Area: 1.1 acres (0.45 ha)
- Built by: Miner, Edward F.
- Architect: Murphy & Dana
- Architectural style: Colonial Revival, Georgian Revival
- NRHP reference No.: 91001871
- Added to NRHP: December 19, 1991

The Townsend G. Treadway House is a historic house at 100 Oakland Street in Bristol, Connecticut. Built in 1915, it is one of the city's largest and finest examples of Colonial Revival architecture, designed by a major New York architectural firm. It was listed on the National Register of Historic Places in 1991.

== Description and history ==
The Townsend G. Treadway House is located in Bristol's Federal Hill neighborhood, long one of its most affluent residential areas. It stands at the southeast corner of Oakland Street and Grove Street, just south of the Federal Hill Historic District. It is a 2 1/2-story brick building, with a gambrel roof and a roughly L-shaped plan. The formal main facade faces west to Oakland Street, and is five bays wide, with a recessed center entrance. The entry recess is arched, and is framed by fluted wooden Corinthian pilasters and a fully pedimented gable. The interior of the recess is finished in wooden paneling, and there is a semi-oval transom above the door. A two-story service ell extends to the rear, its northern facade sheltered by a two-story porch with four Tuscan columns and a modillioned cornice. Both street-facing facades have gabled dormers with round-arch windows. The interior is finished with lavish carved woodwork and other original period features.

The house was built in 1915 for Townsend G. Treadway, a descendant of clockmaker Eli Terry and a member of one of the city's most influential industrial families. The house was designed by the New York firm Murphy & Dana, whose commissions include a number of other high-profile designs in northwestern Connecticut. Treadway remained in the house until his death in 1972, after which it was sold out of the family. It was enlarged in 1936, to a design by Dana, in which the original single-story kitchen wing was raised to two stories, and the portico added.

== See also ==
- National Register of Historic Places listings in Hartford County, Connecticut
