= New Britain Opera House =

- U.S. National Register of Historic Places
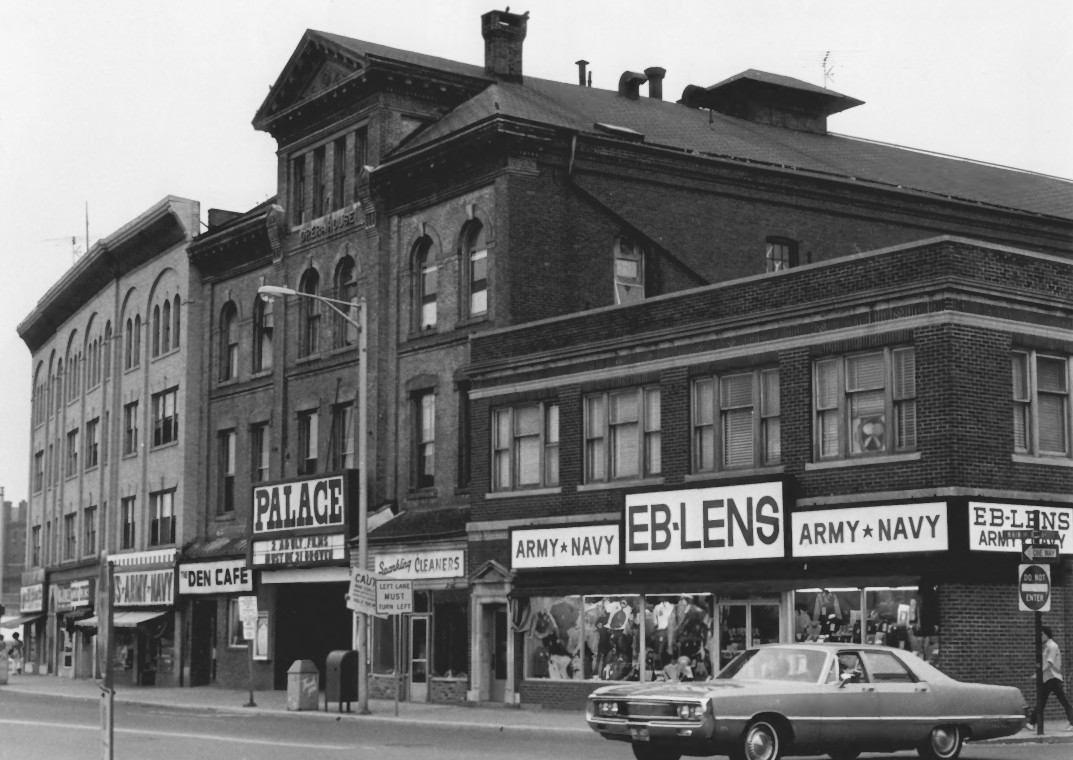
- The building in 1976

- Location within Connecticut Location within the United States
- Location: 466-468 Main Street, New Britain, Connecticut
- Coordinates: 41°40′14″N 72°46′55″W
- Area: less than one acre
- Built: 1880
- Architect: Hill, Robert W.
- Architectural style: Italian Renaissance Revival
- NRHP reference No.: 77001421
- Added to NRHP: October 7, 1977

The New Britain Opera House, also known as the Palace Theater, was a performance venue and movie house on Main Street in downtown New Britain, Connecticut. Built in 1880, it was a prominent local example of Renaissance Revival architecture, serving as an entertainment venue for about a century. It was listed on the National Register of Historic Places in 1977. It has since been demolished as part of local urban renewal.

== Description and history ==
The New Britain Opera House stood on the north side of New Britain's downtown, on the west side Main Street between Myrtle and Lafayette Streets. This area was separated from the 19th-century downtown in the mid-20th century by the construction of the Connecticut Route 72, a depressed limited-access highway. It was a three-story brick building with Renaissance Revival style, sharing party walls on either side with other buildings. Its front facade was divided into three sections, with the theater entrance flanked by commercial spaces on the ground floor, and two windows in each section on the upper floors. The second-floor windows were set in rectangular openings, and those on the third floor were in round-arch openings. The center section extended upward to a wall dormer with four closely set windows topped by a fully pedimented gable.

The theater was built in 1880 to a design by Robert Hill, a prominent local architect. Unusual for similar buildings in other cities, it was not built for local businessmen, but for what was termed at the time "comparatively speaking, working men" of Irish descent. It houses theatrical and vaudeville productions for many years and was eventually adapted for the showing of movies. By the time of its listing on the National Register in 1977, it had been reduced to showing X-rated films and had become isolated from the rest of the downtown by the highway construction. It was later demolished (sometime before 1994) as part of local urban renewal activities.

== See also ==
- National Register of Historic Places listings in Hartford County, Connecticut
