= Old Bristol High School =

School in Connecticut, US

- Bristol High School
- U.S. National Register of Historic Places
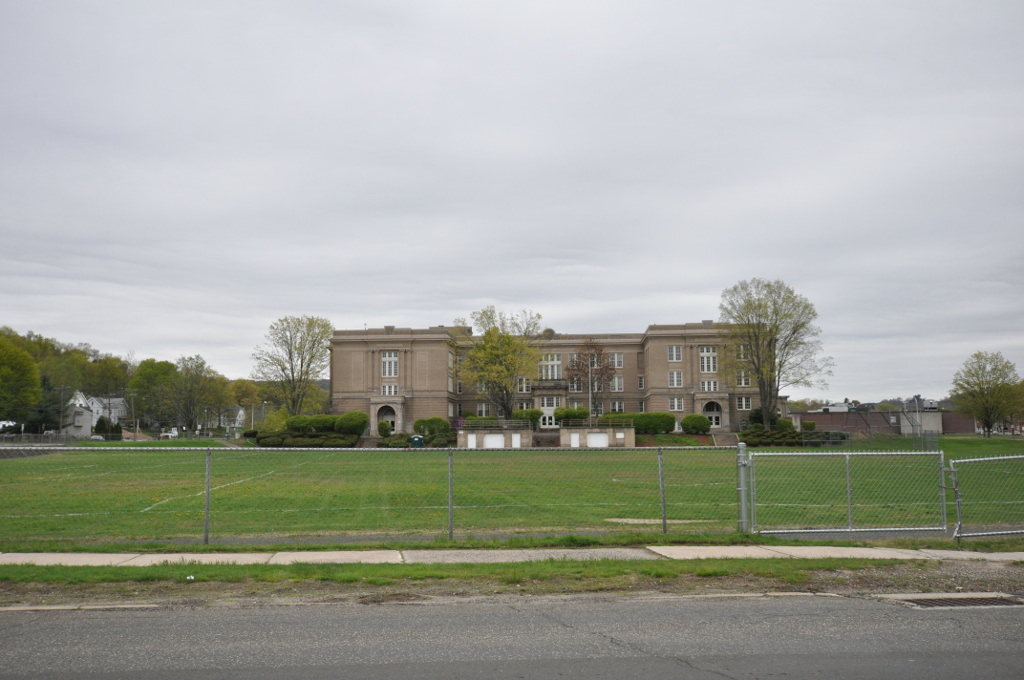

- Location within Connecticut Location within the United States
- Location: 70 Memorial Boulevard, Bristol, Connecticut
- Coordinates: 41°40′11″N 72°56′19″W
- Area: 7.4 acres (3.0 ha)
- Built: 1923
- Architect: Potter, George
- Architectural style: Classical Revival
- NRHP reference No.: 100002506
- Added to NRHP: May 8, 2017

The Old Bristol High School, most recently the Memorial Boulevard Middle School, is a historic school building at 70 Memorial Boulevard in Bristol, Connecticut. A state of the art facility when completed in 1923, the school served the city as a high school until 1967, and is a good example of Classical Revival architecture designed by noted school architect George W. Potter. The building served as a middle school until 2012, closed down, and reopened in 2022 as Bristol Arts and Innovation Magnet School after considerable interior renovations. The property was listed on the National Register of Historic Places in 2018.

== Description and history ==
Bristol's old high school building is located just south of its downtown, on 7.4 acres (3.0 ha) bounded by Memorial Boulevard on the north, and Mellen, South, and Willis Streets on the other three sides. It is a large three-story structure, built with load-bearing brick walls trimmed in cast stone. It has an H-shaped plan, with a north-south central section joining wings oriented east-west. The main entrance is in the eastern face of the center section, with secondary entrances at the faces of the wings. The roof is ringed by a low parapet, with has stepped elements above each of the entrances.

The city of Bristol first began offering high school level education in 1883. Classes were at first held in several district schoolhouses, and its first high school (now home to the local historical society) was built in 1891. Increasing population over the next two decades made the need for a new high school apparent, and this building was erected in 1921-23. The school was designed by New York City architect George Potter, who had already designed schools for the city and other locations in Connecticut, and was built on land donated by local industrialist and philanthropist Albert F. Rockwell.

== See also ==
- National Register of Historic Places listings in Hartford County, Connecticut
