= Gilman-Hayden House =

Historic house in Connecticut, United States

- U.S. National Register of Historic Places
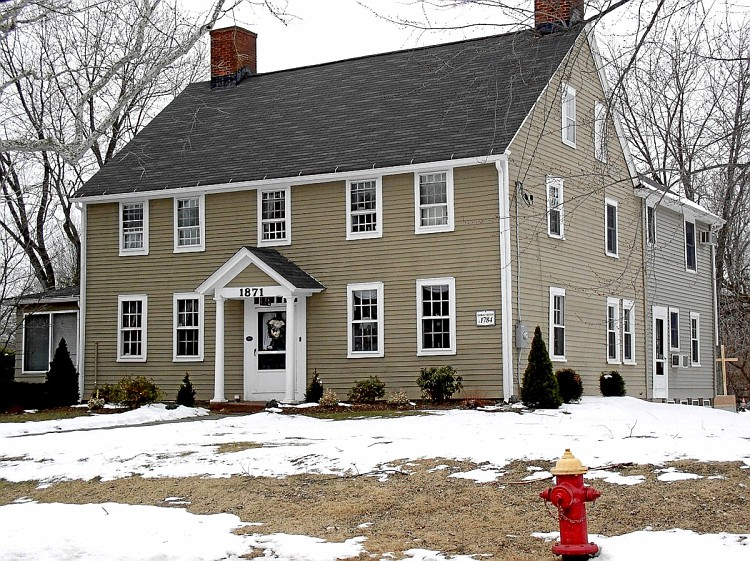

- Location within Connecticut Location within the United States
- Location: 1871 Main Street, East Hartford, Connecticut
- Coordinates: 41°47′30″N 72°38′1″W
- Area: 0.8 acres (0.32 ha)
- Built: 1784
- Built by: Gilman, George
- Architectural style: Georgian
- NRHP reference No.: 84001007
- Added to NRHP: August 16, 1984

The Gilman-Hayden House is a historic house at 1871 Main Street in East Hartford, Connecticut. Built in 1784, it is a good local example of Georgian architecture, and is also notable as the home of Edward Hayden, a diarist of the American Civil War. It was listed on the National Register of Historic Places in 1984.

== Description and history ==
The Gilman-Hayden House is located on a rural-residential stretch of East Hartford's Main Street, between Gilman and King Streets. It is a 2 1/2-story wood-frame structure, with a side-gable roof and clapboarded exterior. Its main facade faces east and is five bays wide, with a center entrance sheltered by a gabled portico. A two-story ell extends to the rear, and an enclosed porch projects to the south. The interior of the house follows a typical center-hall plan, with two rooms on either side of the hall on both floors. The interior retains many original period features, including bead-board paneling, built-in cupboards, and wrought iron hardware. The two front parlor spaces feature fine fireplace surrounds.

The house was built in 1784 by George Gilman, a descendant of some of the area's earliest settlers. The Gilmans originally owned land all the way to the Connecticut River, and operated a ferry. In the second quarter of the 19th century the property came into the hands of the Williams family, whose most famous member was William Williams, a signatory of the United States Declaration of Independence. In 1867, the house was purchased by Edward Hayden, whose mother was a Williams. Hayden is most notable for the unique diary he kept of his experiences during and after the American Civil War. One portion of the diary was written on a similar diary Hayden recovered from a Confederate Army soldier, and provides a unique window into the affairs of the war.

== See also ==
- National Register of Historic Places listings in Hartford County, Connecticut
