= William Jerome I House =

Historic house in Connecticut, United States

- U.S. National Register of Historic Places
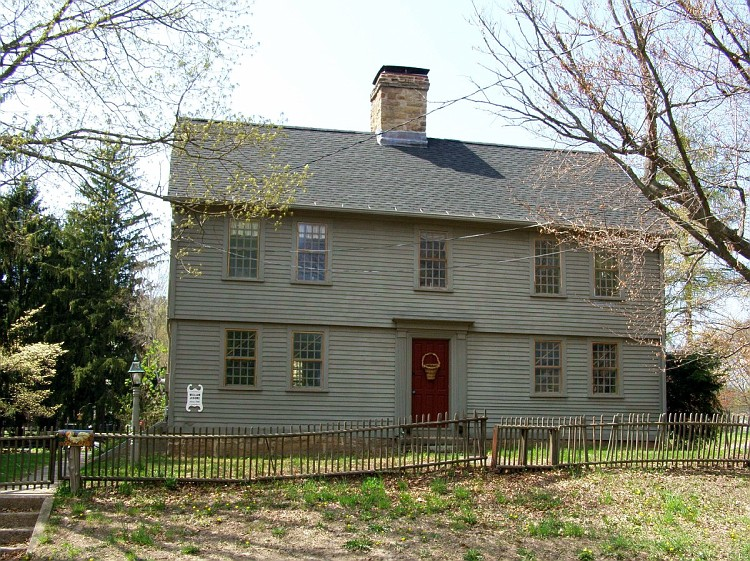

- Location within Connecticut Location within the United States
- Location: 367 Jerome Avenue, Bristol, Connecticut
- Coordinates: 41°41′59″N 72°55′46″W
- Area: 2.7 acres (1.1 ha)
- Built: 1742
- NRHP reference No.: 87000792
- Added to NRHP: June 2, 1987

The William Jerome I House is a historic house at 367 Jerome Avenue in Bristol, Connecticut. Probably built in 1742 by one of Bristol's early colonial settlers, it is one of the city's oldest surviving buildings. It was listed on the National Register of Historic Places in 1987.

== Description and history ==
The William Jerome I House stands in what is now a suburban residential setting in northeastern Bristol, at the southwest corner of Warner Street and Jerome Avenue. It is a 2 1/2-story wood-frame structure with a side-gable roof, central chimney, and clapboarded exterior. Its main facade is five bays wide, with a center entrance framed by fluted pilasters, a corniced entablature, and a slightly overhanging second floor. A lean-to section extends to the rear, giving the house a classic colonial saltbox profile. The interior has a typical Georgian central chimney plan, with parlors on either side of the chimney and the former kitchen behind. The front entry vestibule, which originally had a narrow winding stair, has been modernized. The main building timbers have been cased in a beaded board, and there are still original doors and a corner cabinet in one of the parlors.

William Jerome was one of the early settlers of Bristol, arriving in 1740 when it was part of Farmington. Jerome was one of the town's wealthiest residents and the only one to be listed as an enslaver in the 1790 census. Jerome's son William II built a house that survives north of this one. Only a small number of 18th-century houses survive in Bristol.

== See also ==
- National Register of Historic Places listings in Hartford County, Connecticut
