= New Haven District Campground =

- U.S. National Register of Historic Places
- U.S. Historic district
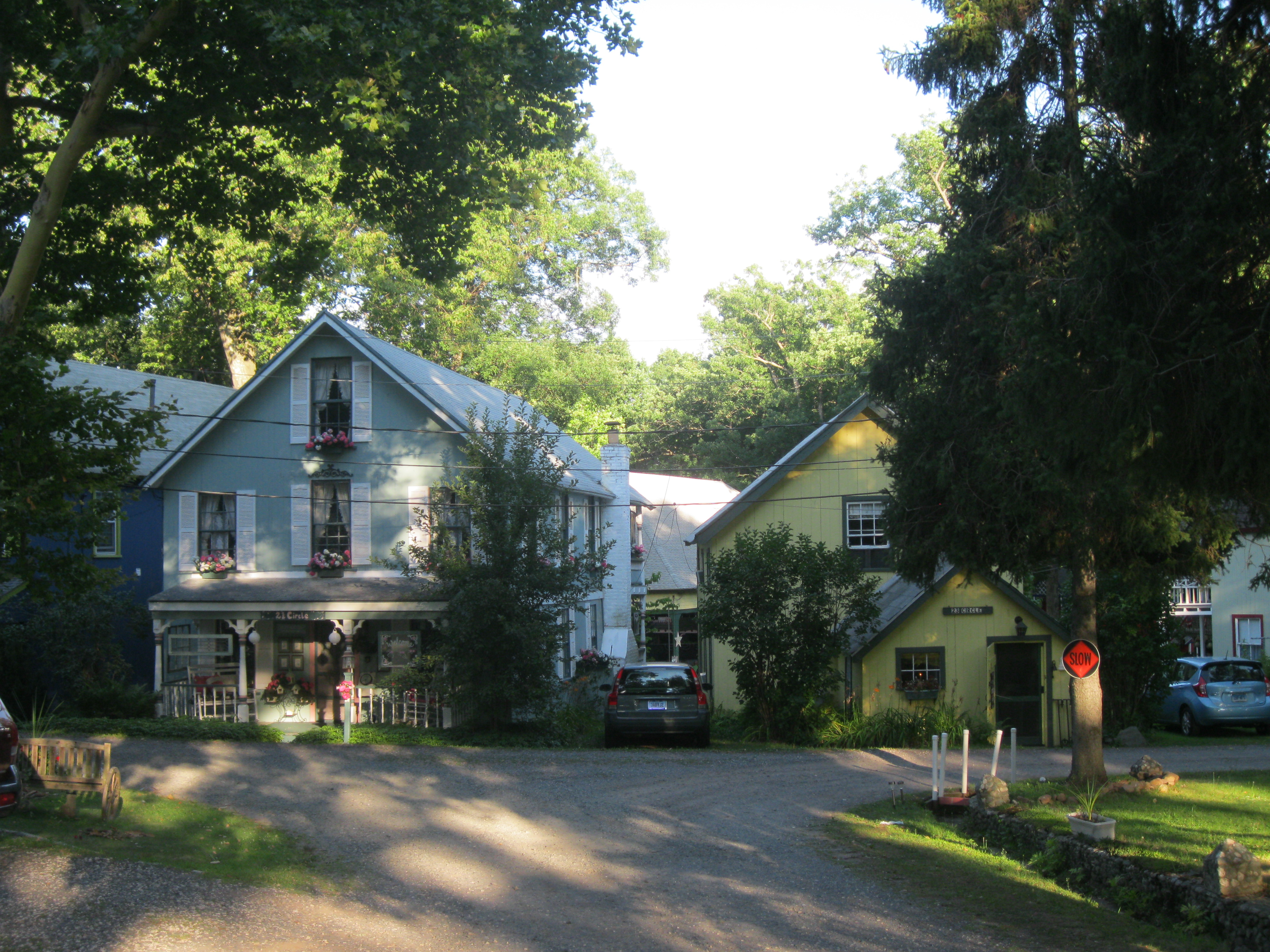

- Location within Connecticut Location within the United States
- Location: Camp Street and Gladding Avenue, Plainville, Connecticut
- Coordinates: 41°41′10″N 72°53′23″W
- Area: 17.1 acres (6.9 ha)
- Built: 1865
- NRHP reference No.: 80004065
- Added to NRHP: May 19, 1980

The New Haven District Campground, also known as the Plainville Campground, is a historic Methodist camp meeting site on Gladding Avenue in Plainville, Connecticut. Opened in 1865, the campground was used by Connecticut Methodists to partake in the 19th-century trend of religious and recreational camp meetings, and is now a secular community of summer homes. The campground was added to the National Register of Historic Places on May 19, 1980.

== Description and history ==
The New Haven District Campground is located on northwestern Plainville, on about 17 acres (6.9 ha) of land northeast of the junction of Camp Street and Northwest Drive. It consists of a network of roads, entered via Gladding Avenue, that radiate to the north from Circle Avenue, at whose center is the main pavilion. The roads are otherwise densely built with small wood-frame cottages. All are one to two stories in height, and many feature gingerbread decoration typical of other camp meeting architecture.

Despite their original purpose as revivalist gatherings, camp meetings became a popular leisure destination for the middle class in the 19th century due to their moral nature and affordability. The campground consists of 89 cottages, built as permanent replacements for the site's original tents, which surround a central preaching area in the camp meeting's traditional circular pattern. At the height of its popularity, the campsite had its own railroad station and spurred the local economy in what was at the time a rural area. The campground lost its religious affiliation in 1957, though the cottages are still used as summer homes.

== See also ==
- National Register of Historic Places listings in Hartford County, Connecticut
