= Selden Brewer House =

Historic house in Connecticut, United States

- U.S. National Register of Historic Places
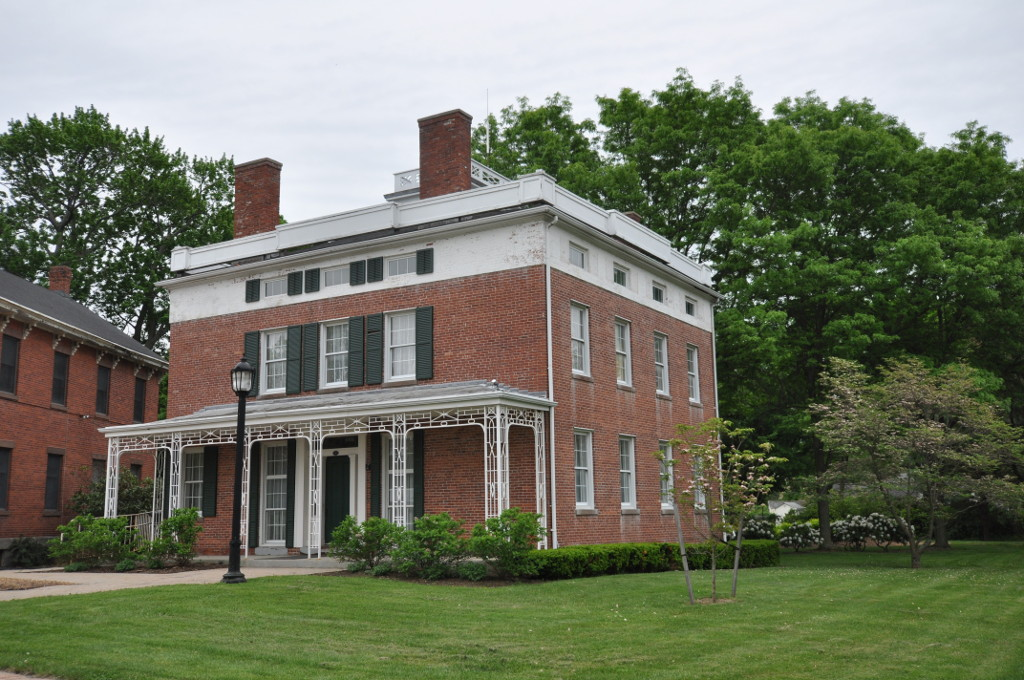

- Location within Connecticut Location within the United States
- Location: Naubuc Avenue and Main Street, East Hartford, Connecticut
- Coordinates: 41°44′6″N 72°37′41″W
- Built: 1827
- Architectural style: Greek Revival, Federal
- NRHP reference No.: 79002631
- Added to NRHP: June 4, 1979

The Selden Brewer House is a historic house at Naubuc Avenue and Main Street in East Hartford, Connecticut. Built about 1827, it is a good local example of late Federal/early Greek Revival architecture. It was built and owned for many years by a prominent local tobacco-growing family. Originally located on High Street, it was moved to its present location in the 1980s, and now houses offices of the local historical society. It was listed on the National Register of Historic Places in 1979.

== Description and history ==
The Selden Brewer House is located in a mixed commercial-residential area of southern East Hartford, and the southern corner of Main Street and Naubuc Avenue. It is a three-story brick structure with a low-pitch hip roof surrounded by a wooden paneled balustrade. The building is roughly cube-shaped in appearance, with its facade facing north toward Main Street. Only three bays wide, the bays are set closely together near the center of the facade. A single-story porch extends across the entire width of the facade. The third floor of the house functions as a raised attic, with narrow windows below the eave. The interior includes a mix of stylistic elements, ranging from the Federal to the Late Victorian.

The house was built c. 1827–30, probably by Samuel Brewer, although the property was then listed as belonging to his sixteen-year-old son Selden. The Brewers were a prominent local landowner since the 1750s, and were engaged in the growing of tobacco, for which this portion of the Connecticut River valley was well suited. It is the oldest home associated with the family to survive. It was originally located on High Street, which at the time was lined with similar high-quality homes. At the time of its listing on the National Register in 1979, the property was completely surrounded by modern development and access ramps to Connecticut Route 2. It was moved to its present location in the 1980s, and now houses offices of the local historical society.

== See also ==
- National Register of Historic Places listings in Hartford County, Connecticut
