= Whitfield Cowles House =

Historic house in Connecticut, United States

- U.S. National Register of Historic Places
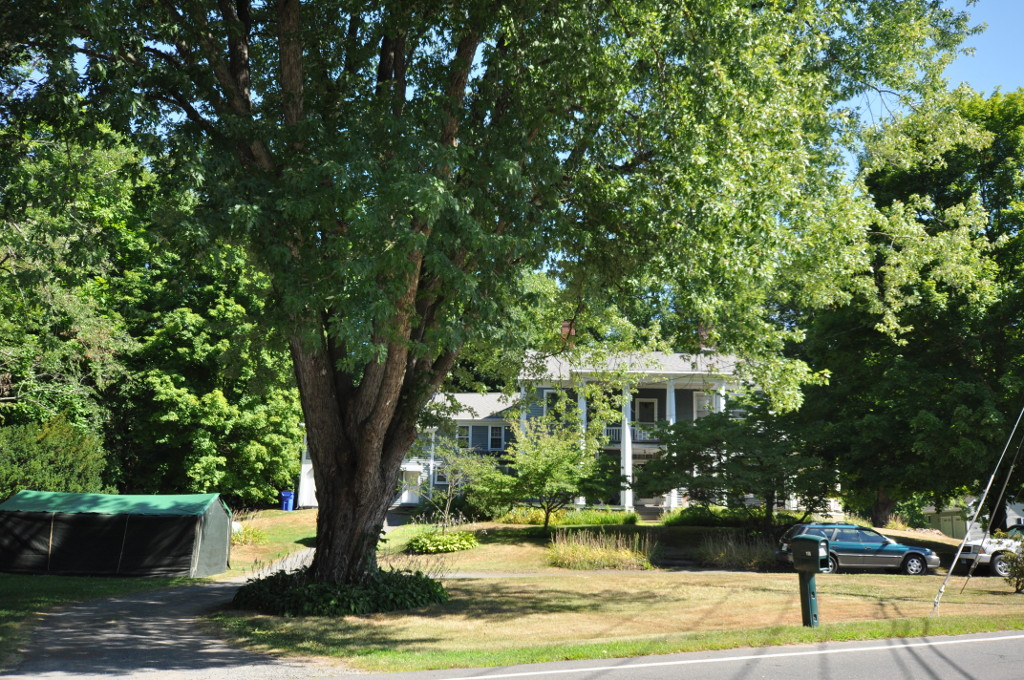

- Location within Connecticut Location within the United States
- Location: 118 Spoonville Road, East Granby, Connecticut
- Coordinates: 41°54′53″N 72°44′45″W
- Area: 3.75 acres (1.52 ha)
- Built: 1785
- Architectural style: Colonial, Colonial Revival
- NRHP reference No.: 13000528
- Added to NRHP: April 8, 2014

The Whitfield Cowles House is a historic house at 118 Spoonville Road in East Granby, Connecticut. Built about 1785, it was home to one of the early innovators in the development of silver plating, and was (as of 2026) still owned by the Cowles. It was listed on the National Register of Historic Places in 2014.

== Description and history ==
The Whitfield Cowles House is located in a rural-residential area of southern East Granby, on the north side of Spoonville Road just east of its junction with South Main Street (Connecticut Route 187). It is set facing south on a short stub of an abandoned colonial-era roadway, near the southern edge of a mainly wooded 3.75-acre (1.52 ha) parcel. It is a 2 1/2-story wood-frame structure, with a side-gable roof, end chimneys, and a clapboarded exterior. Its most prominent feature is a two-story Colonial Revival portico, which extends across the center three bays. It has four fluted Doric columns, which rise to a narrow frieze and dentillated cornice. A balcony, partially supported by the central two columns is set under the portico and over the main entrance. The entry is like the portico an early 20th-century alteration, with flanking sidelight windows. The interior follows a central hall plan, with a single-run staircase. The interior decoration is a mix of Colonial Revival and Georgian-Federal late 18th century elements.

The house was built about 1785, probably by Joseph Griswold Jr., who sold the house and 75 acres (30 ha) to Reverend Whitfield Cowles in 1802. Cowles did not receive adequate financial support from his congregation, and eventually turned to other business endeavours to supplement his ministerial pay. He was dismissed from his position over political differences in 1808, and devoted himself entirely to business. With partners, he established a nearly complete textile operation, and also produced carding equipment and other tools. A major initiative of his was the establishment of a wire factory not far from his home. He soon began experimenting with electroplating silver, a pursuit his son William developed after he died. He partnered with silversmiths based in Hartford for the manufacture of silver-plated spoons, eventually expanding to a wide array of domestic silverware. By the mid-1840s Cowles was shipping his products as far off as South Carolina. However, the business was laden with debt, and eventually failed. Some of Cowles' partners and employees went on to more successful development of the technology, leading Connecticut to become a center of silver-plate manufacturing by the late 19th century.

== See also ==
- National Register of Historic Places listings in Hartford County, Connecticut
