= Woodbridge Farmstead =

Historic house in Connecticut, United States

- U.S. National Register of Historic Places
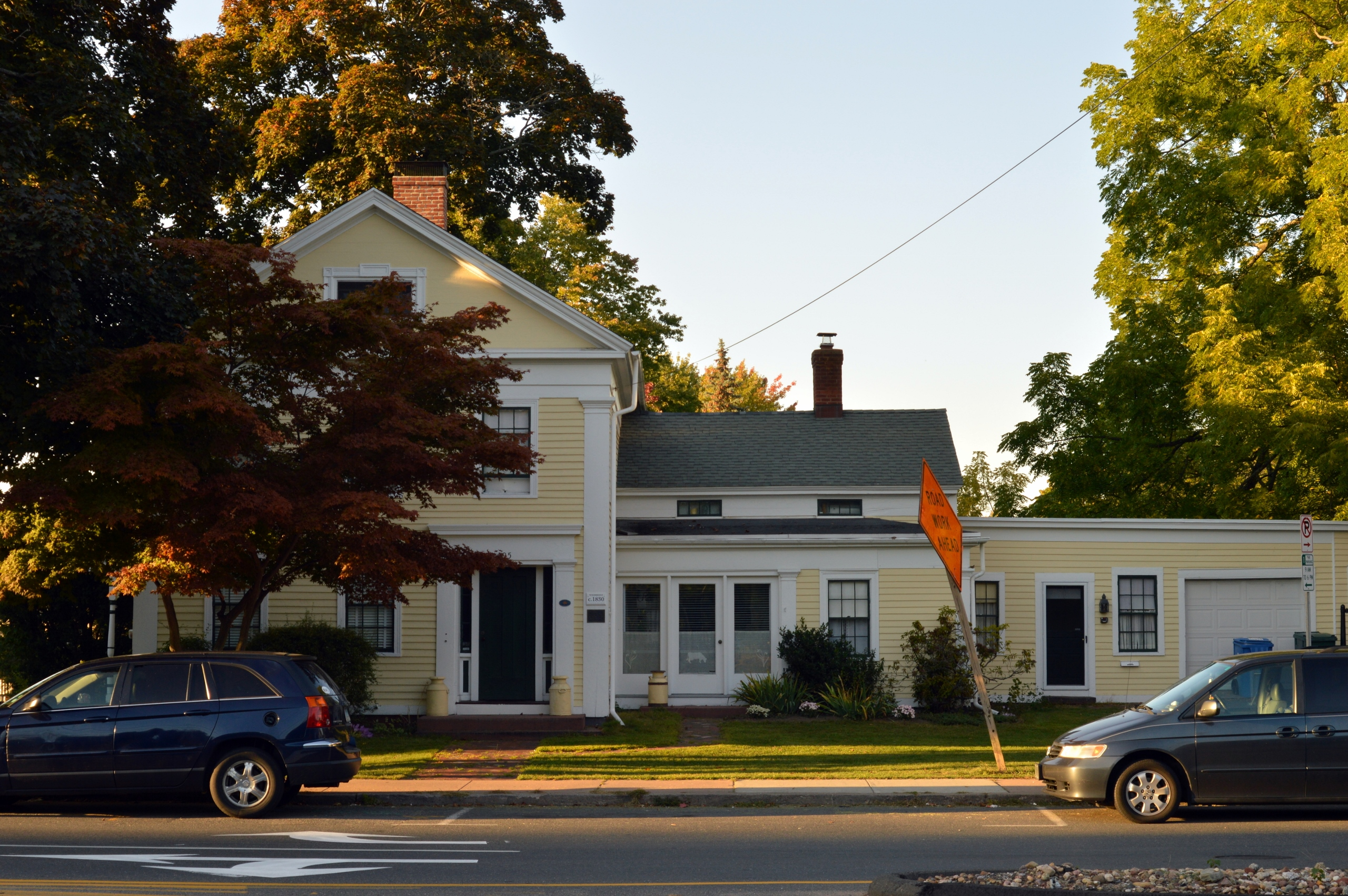

- Location within Connecticut Location within the United States
- Location: 495 Middle Turnpike East, Manchester, Connecticut
- Coordinates: 41°47′5″N 72°30′1″W
- Area: 2.1 acres (0.85 ha)
- Built: 1835
- Architectural style: Greek Revival
- NRHP reference No.: 99000925
- Added to NRHP: August 5, 1999

The Woodbridge Farmstead is a historic house at 495 Middle Turnpike East in Manchester, Connecticut. Built about 1835, it is a well-preserved example of a Greek Revival farmhouse, with a history of ownership by a single family extending over more than 150 years. It was listed on the National Register of Historic Places in 1999.

== Description and history ==
The Woodbridge Farmstead is now hemmed into a mixed residential-commercial area at the eastern end of Middle Turnpike East, near its junction with East Center Street (United States Route 44). It is a 2 1/2-story wood-frame structure, with a gabled roof and clapboarded exterior. A single-story ell and garage extend to the right side. The main block is three bays wide, with broad corner pilasters rising to an entablature and fully pedimented gable. The main entrance is in the right bay, flanked by sidelight windows and pilasters, and topped by a corniced entablature. The interior follows a typical Greek Revival side hall plan, and retains many original features, including carved woodwork and fireplace surrounds. Two period barns stand near the rear of the property.

The farmhouse was the centerpiece of Meadow Brook Farm, about 149 acres (60 ha) in size. Land for this farm belonged to Deodat Woodbridge, owner of a nearby tavern, in the early 19th century. His son Deodatus inherited this land in 1835, and probably built the house soon afterward. The farm remained in active agricultural use until about 1951, when the family sold off for development all but the 2.1 acres (0.85 ha) with the house on it. At the time of the property's 1999 National Register listing, it was owned by the fifth direct descendant of Deodatus Woodbridge.

== See also ==
- National Register of Historic Places listings in Hartford County, Connecticut
