= St. Mary's Parochial School =

- U.S. National Register of Historic Places
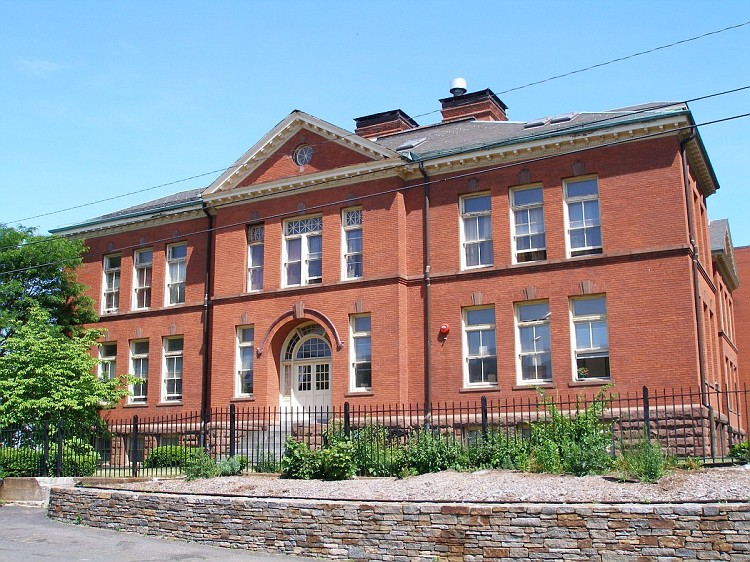

- Location within Connecticut Location within the United States
- Location: Beaver Street South of Broad Street, New Britain, Connecticut
- Coordinates: 41°40′18″N 72°46′58″W
- Area: less than one acre
- Built: 1904
- Architect: Cadwell, William H.
- Architectural style: Colonial Revival, Classical Revival
- NRHP reference No.: 91000364
- Added to NRHP: April 03, 1991

St. Mary's Parochial School is a historic former parochial school on Beaver Street South of Broad Street in New Britain, Connecticut. Built in 1904, it was the first brick school building in the city, and a fine example of Classical Revival architecture. It served as a school until 1972, and was converted into elderly housing in the 1990s. The building was listed on the National Register of Historic Places in 1991.

== Description and history ==
The former St. Mary's Parochial School is located on the north side of New Britain's Downtown Area, behind St. Mary's Church on the east side of Beaver Street. It is a three-story brick structure on a brownstone foundation, with a hip roof and a slightly projecting gabled entry section. The main entrance stands under a large round-arch recess, which is flanked by narrow sash windows with transom. A brownstone beltcourse separates the floors, and there are a pair of sash windows above the entrance arch, with flanking narrow sash windows; these windows are all topped by transoms with diamond grillwork.

St. Mary's parish was established in 1850 to serve the city's growing Irish immigrant population. Its first parochial school was established in 1862, in a frame building at High and Myrtle Streets. This building was constructed in 1904 as a replacement for that one, and was the city's first brick school building. It continued to serve New Britain's increasingly diverse Catholic population as its only parochial school until 1938, when a second school was built by St. Ann's. This school was closed in 1972, and used by the parish for other purposes until 1974, when it was permanently shuttered.

== See also ==
- National Register of Historic Places listings in Hartford County, Connecticut
