= Roger Butler House =

Historic house in Connecticut, United States

- U.S. National Register of Historic Places
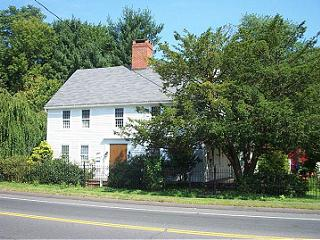

- Location within Connecticut Location within the United States
- Location: 146 Jordan Lane, Wethersfield, Connecticut
- Coordinates: 41°43′24″N 72°40′17″W
- Area: less than one acre
- Built: c. 1769
- Architectural style: Colonial
- NRHP reference No.: 96000847
- Added to NRHP: August 15, 1996

The Roger Butler House is a historic house located in Wethersfield, Connecticut. Built about 1769, it is a well-preserved example of Georgian architecture, its only principal alteration the Italianate entrance surround. The house was listed on the National Register of Historic Places on August 15, 1996.

== Description and history ==
The house stands on the north side of Jordan Lane, just east of its junction with Wolcott Hill Road. The Wilbur Cross Parkway passes on an embankment at the rear of the house, giving it a triangular lot. It is a 2 1/2-story wood-frame structure, five bays wide, with a large central chimney and a centered entrance. Porches, probably added in the mid-19th century, are on the east and back sides. The front entrance was at one time sheltered by an Italianate hood, but that has been removed; it now has a simpler Georgian surround with corniced entablature. The interior retains a nearly complete set of original flooring, woodwork, and door hardware.

The house was built c. 1769, and remained in the hands of his descendants until 1954. The Butler family was long prominent in the area, its progenitor, Deacon Richard Butler, arriving in 1633. William Butler purchase the land this house stands on in 1767, and probably built this house two years later as a wedding gift for his son Roger. Local lore claims that the house was a stop on the Underground Railroad in the 19th century.

== See also ==
- National Register of Historic Places listings in Hartford County, Connecticut
