= Union Village Historic District (Manchester, Connecticut) =

Historic district in Connecticut, United States

- U.S. National Register of Historic Places
- U.S. Historic district
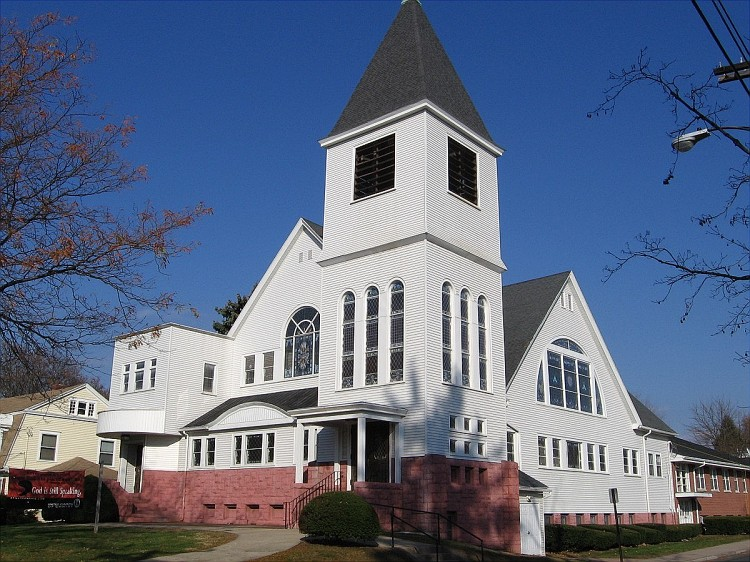
- Second Congregational Church

- Location within Connecticut Location within the United States
- Location: Roughly bounded by Union Pond, Oakland Street, Railroad Right of Way, Marble Street, Hockanum River, Manchester, Connecticut
- Coordinates: 41°47′47″N 72°31′43″W
- Area: 100 acres (40 ha)
- Architectural style: Federal, Greek Revival
- NRHP reference No.: 02000831
- Added to NRHP: August 6, 2002

The Union Village Historic District encompasses the core of a historic 19th-century residential mill village in Manchester, Connecticut. Radiating north and west from the junction of Union Street and North Main Street, the area was developed in the first half of the 19th century as a company town, but evolved into a mixed working-class community in the 20th century. It was listed on the National Register of Historic Places in 2002.

== Description and history ==
The area that is now Union Village first saw industrial activity around 1794, when one of Connecticut's first cotton mills was erected on the banks of the Hockanum River in what was then part of East Hartford. The mills grew rapidly after the Union Manufacturing Company was established in 1819, and Manchester was incorporated in 1823. By 1850 the company had built a series of worker residences along Union, Kerry, and North Streets, mainly duplexes for its laborers, but also higher-quality Greek Revival houses for its managers. The arrival of the railroad in 1849 spurred further growth, and made Union Village the economic center of the town. Further groups of worker housing were built by paper manufacturers whose mills were located nearby. The cotton mills declined due to cotton shortages in the American Civil War, and by increased efficiencies of competing larger operations elsewhere, but the paper mills continued the village's economic success, as did the Cheney Brothers silk works to the south, which were made accessible to workers living here by trolley service introduced in the 1880s.

The historic district is roughly T-shaped and about 100 acres (40 ha) in size. Its central portion consists of Union and North Streets, running north from North Main Street to Union Pond, with an extension east along Golway Street to include Robertson Park and a cluster of housing in the Edwards Street area. It also extends west along North Main Street just beyond Marble Street. There are more than 170 historic buildings, most of which are residences built between the late 18th and early 20th centuries. There are four churches, a library, and the 1914 Colonial Revival North District School.

== See also ==
- National Register of Historic Places listings in Hartford County, Connecticut
