= Makens Bemont House =

Historic house in Connecticut, United States

- U.S. National Register of Historic Places
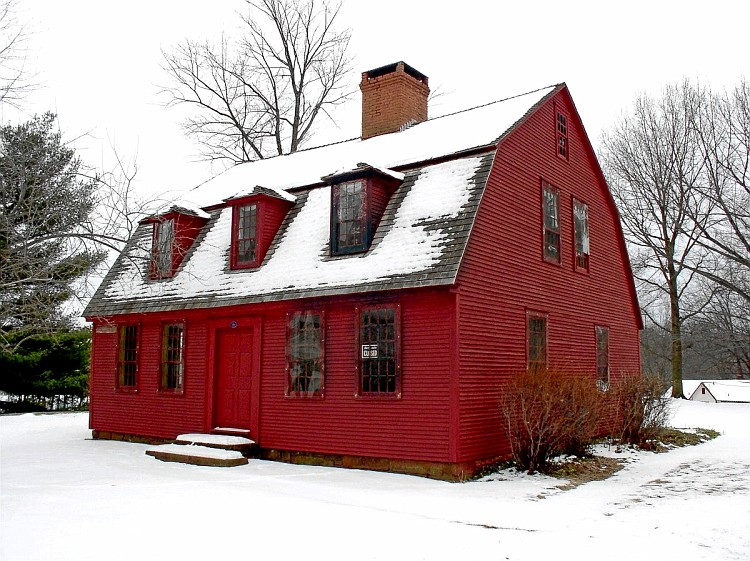

- Location within Connecticut Location within the United States
- Location: 307 Burnside Avenue, East Hartford, Connecticut
- Coordinates: 41°46′33″N 72°37′31″W
- Area: less than 1 acre (0.40 ha)
- Built: 1761, 1971
- NRHP reference No.: 82004397
- Added to NRHP: March 25, 1982

The Makens Bemont House, commonly called the Huguenot House, is a historic house museum at 307 Burnside Avenue in East Hartford, Connecticut. Built in 1761, it is one of the town's few surviving 18th-century buildings, and is one of several buildings located in Martin Park that are operated by the Historical Society of East Hartford as the Historical Houses at Martin Park. It was listed on the National Register of Historic Places in 1982.

== Description and history ==
The Makens Bemont House stands near the entrance of Martin Park, which is located just east of East Hartford's Burnside Avenue commercial district. The house is a 1 1/2-story gambrel-roofed wood-frame structure, five bays wide, with a clapboarded exterior. It rest on a foundation that has a concrete base, but is topped by brownstones used in its original foundation. It has a brick central chimney, and the roof is pierced by three gabled dormers. Its interior retains wide pine floorboards and other 18th and 19th-century stylistic features, including a Federal style fireplace mantel, and Greek Revival elements in the northwest chamber.

The house was built in 1761 by Edmond Bemont, and purchased four years later by his son Makens. Makens Bemont was a prominent local businessman who made saddles and owned shares in the local bridge. He served as the town tax collector, and accumulated sufficient wealth that he was one of the few townspeople of his period to own a carriage. The house was originally located on the other side of Burnside Avenue and about 2,500 feet (760 m) west of its present location. It was moved in 1971 after it was threatened with demolition, and now serves as a local house museum. It is furnished to appear as if owned by a late 18th/early 19th century workingman, and is open seasonally.

== See also ==
- National Register of Historic Places listings in Hartford County, Connecticut
