= Naubuc Avenue-Broad Street Historic District =

Historic district in Connecticut, United States

- U.S. National Register of Historic Places
- U.S. Historic district
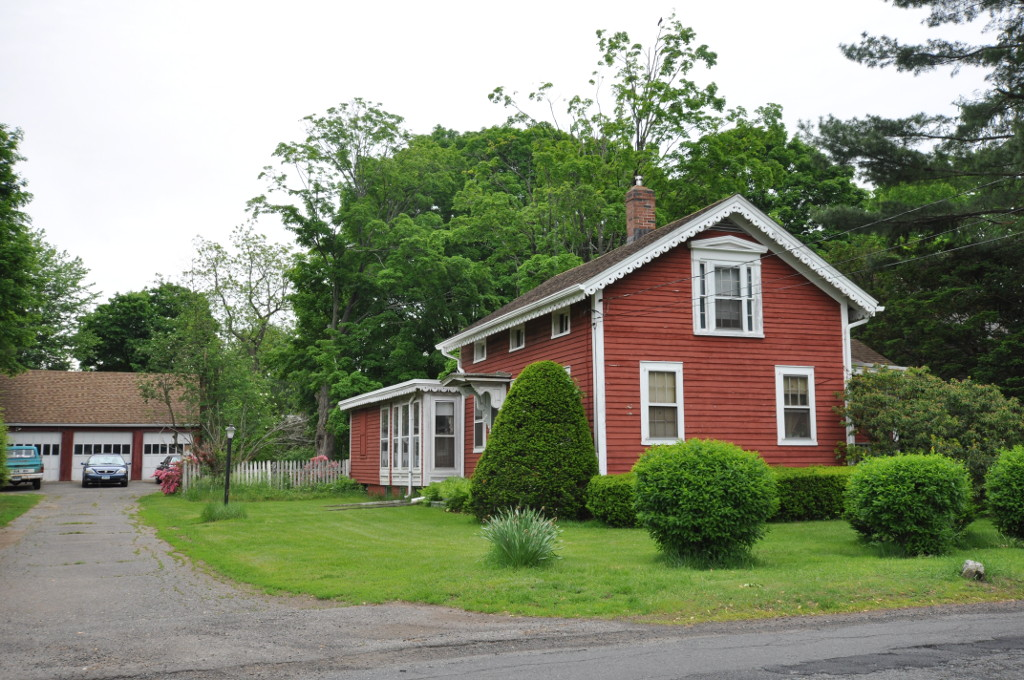

- Location within Connecticut Location within the United States
- Location: Roughly along Broad Street and Naubuc Avenue, East Hartford, Connecticut
- Coordinates: 41°43′48″N 72°37′38″W
- Area: 32 acres (13 ha)
- Built: 1941
- Architectural style: Colonial, Mid 19th Century Revival, Late Victorian
- NRHP reference No.: 98001439
- Added to NRHP: December 4, 1998

The Naubuc Avenue-Broad Street Historic District encompasses a largely agrarian village area of southwestern East Hartford, Connecticut. Extending along Naubuc Avenue from the Glastonbury line to Broad Street, and along Broad to Main Street, its architecture encapsulates the area's history between the 18th and early 20th centuries. It was listed on the National Register of Historic Places in 1998.

== Description and history ==
East Hartford consisted of largely uninhabitated agricultural lands during much of the colonial period, owned and managed by landowners who lived across the Connecticut River in Hartford. Permanent settlement began in the mid-18th-century, but did not increase substantially until after the American Revolutionary War. Naubuc Avenue was laid out around that time, running north from a ferry in Glastonbury to provide access to Keeley Cove, formed out of a meander in the river, where a shipbuilding operation was begun. Beginning in the 1830s, the area's agriculture shifted to the lucrative production of tobacco for cigars, which would remain a dominant feature of the area into the 20th century. A small silverware factory established around the same time also provided industrial employment.

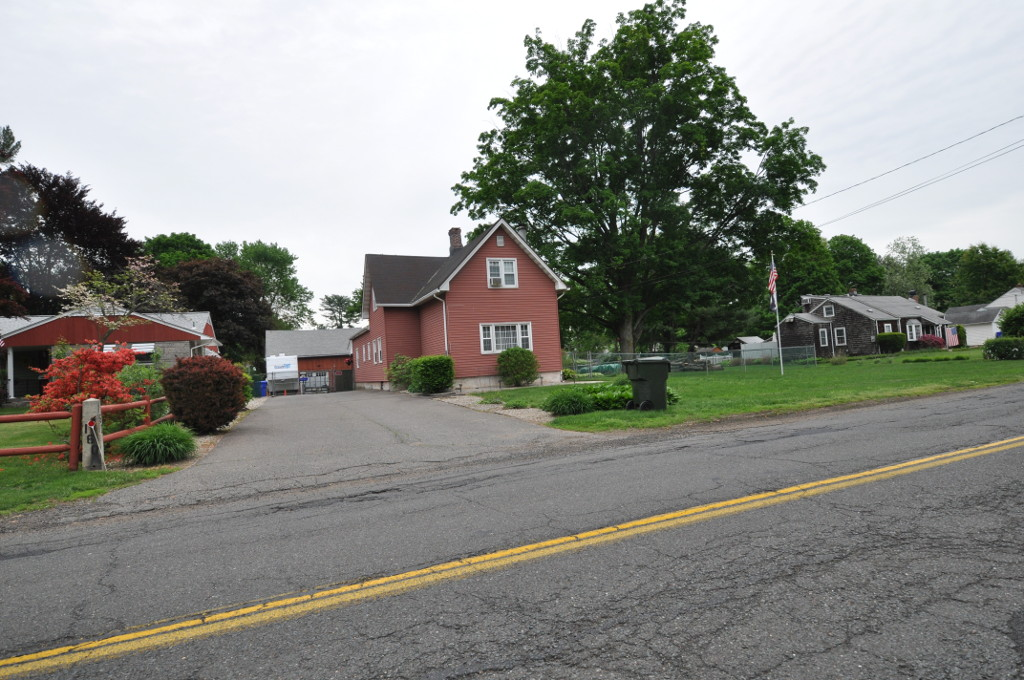
Houses on Naubuc Avenue

The historic district is essentially linear in an L shape. Naubuc Avenue runs north from the Glastonbury line, roughly paralleling Keeley Cove to the west up to Broad Street. From that junction it runs east along Broad Street to Main Street. These streets are now surrounded by suburban development on the formerly agricultural fields, but retain a distinctively 18th and 19th-century spacing and layout. The oldest house in the district is the first to be built by John Kentfield, one of the area's first permanent residents, about 1780; a second house of his, built just a few years later, stands further up Naubuc Avenue to the north. There are several other 18th-century houses in the district, but most of its architecture dates from the mid-19th to early 20th centuries. There are several examples of the Greek Revival, and a few stylish Queen Anne Victorians. The only significant non-residential building is the 1855 Dudley Fox Silver Factory, which was built on a residential scale and has been converted into residential use.

== See also ==
- National Register of Historic Places listings in Hartford County, Connecticut
