= Jean E. Hooker School-Berlin High School =

- U.S. National Register of Historic Places
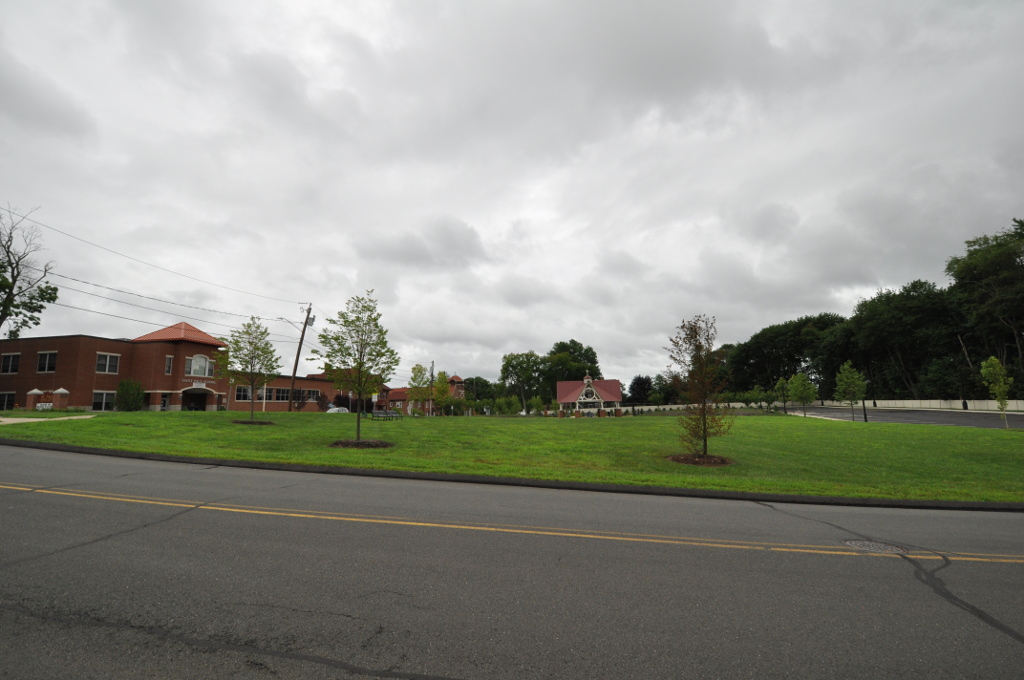
- Site where the school stood

- Location within Connecticut Location within the United States
- Location: 462 Alling Street, Berlin, Connecticut
- Coordinates: 41°38′02″N 72°46′15″W
- Built: 1910
- NRHP reference No.: 12000360
- Added to NRHP: June 27, 2012

The Jean E. Hooker School-Berlin High School, most recently the Kensington Grammar School, was a historic school complex at 462 Alling Street in Berlin, Connecticut. Built in 1910, the building served as both the town's first high school, and as a private school before being converted to an elementary school and finally closing in 1975. The building was listed on the National Register of Historic Places in 2012; it was demolished in 2014.

== Description and history ==
The site of the former Jean E. Hooker School-Berlin High School was at the southeast corner of Alling and Grove Hill Streets, about 1/2 mile from the commercial center of Kensington. The building had two sections: the original 1910 block, and the 1931 addition. The 1910 block was a two-story brick structure, nine bays wide and seven deep, with brownstone trim. The bricks were sourced from local brickyards (a major 19th-century industry in Berlin), and its brickwork was of unusually high quality. It had terra cotta frieze panels depicting a variety of subjects, including St. George slaying the dragon. The 1931 addition was built with similar styling, but also included some Art Deco motifs.

The 1910 school was Berlin's first centralized elementary school. It was designed by Unkelbach and Perry of New Britain, and was built by Thomas Crowe, also of New Britain. By 1919 the school was already over capacity due to the town's growth. That growth also prompted the town to consider building a high school for its older students, who were being educated in the high schools of neighboring communities. In 1931, the Jean E. Hooker School was built as an addition to the grammar school, designed by Hartford architect Frederic Teich.

The school close in 1975, and the building was sold to a developer in 1999. After several failed redevelopment proposals, it was sold to St. Paul Roman Catholic Church in 2013.

== See also ==
- National Register of Historic Places listings in Hartford County, Connecticut
