= Endee Manor Historic District =

Historic district in Connecticut, United States

- U.S. National Register of Historic Places
- U.S. Historic district
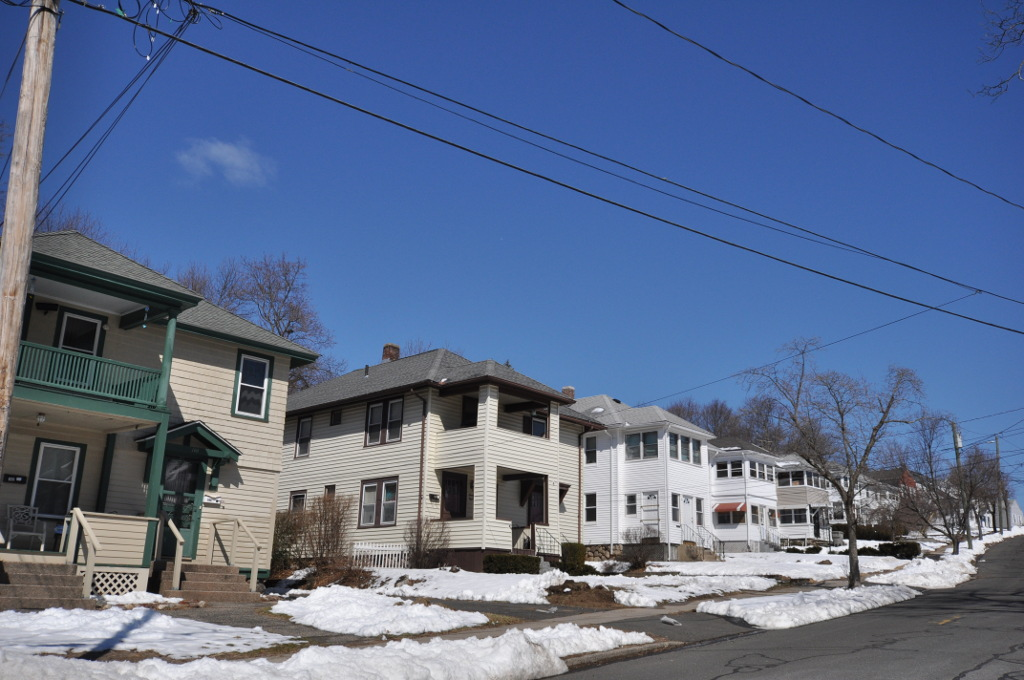

- Location within Connecticut Location within the United States
- Location: Roughly along Sherman, Mills and Putnam Streets, Bristol, Connecticut
- Coordinates: 41°40′44″N 72°57′28″W
- Area: 12 acres (4.9 ha)
- Built: 1916
- Built by: Miner Building Co.
- Architect: Haydon, Harold A.
- Architectural style: Bungalow/craftsman, Foursquare
- NRHP reference No.: 96000027
- Added to NRHP: February 29, 1996

The Endee Manor Historic District encompasses a well-preserved and cohesive early 20th-century worker housing area in Bristol, Connecticut. Located on Sherman, Mills and Putnam Streets, the area was built out in a four-month period in 1916-17, and is the largest such development in the city. It was listed on the National Register of Historic Places in 1996.

== Description and history ==
Endee Manor was the largest of four significant worker housing developments built in Bristol in the 1910s. It was designed by Harold Haydon for the New Departure Manufacturing Company, a subsidiary of General Motors and one of the city's largest employers at the time. The houses in the development were constructed in a four-month period in 1916 and 1917, partly as a response to labor unrest surrounding hiring difficulties by the company (due in part to a housing shortage) that suggested it might leave the community. In contrast to many earlier worker housing initiatives, it was designed to have a park-like setting, with all of the modern conveniences. Its construction received favorable notice in the architectural press of the time as a model for this type of development.

The historic district encompasses a densely built subdivision entered from Terryville Avenue at Sherman Street, northwest of downtown Bristol. It is bounded on the east by West Cemetery and the west by railroad tracks. The development, which was completely built out by 1917, has 102 frame one and two-family houses, all in Bungalow style, that are one or two stories in height. Some of the properties also have garages, most of which were built in the following ten-year period. Most of the buildings follow one of eight different plans but are placed to avoid repetition.

== See also ==
- National Register of Historic Places listings in Hartford County, Connecticut
