= Tunxis Hose Firehouse =

- U.S. National Register of Historic Places
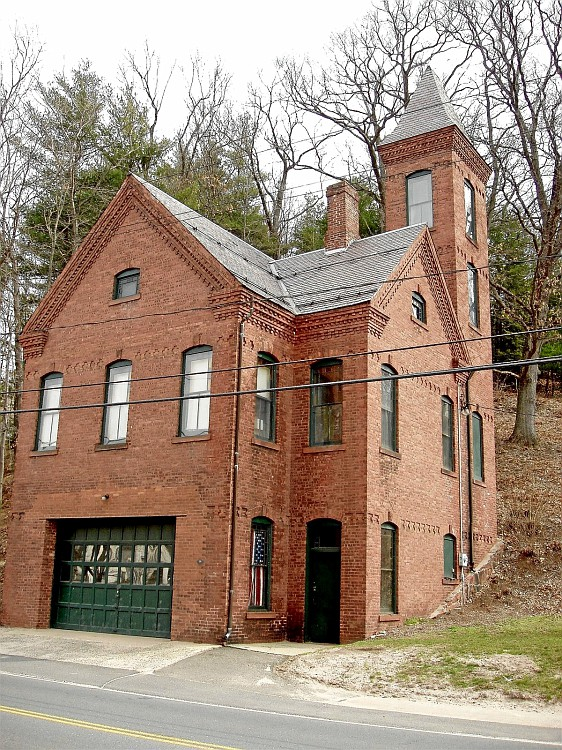

- Location within Connecticut Location within the United States
- Location: Lovely Street and Farmington Avenue, Unionville, Connecticut
- Coordinates: 41°45′31″N 72°53′14″W
- Area: 0.3 acres (0.12 ha)
- Built: 1893
- Built by: Jetner, Joseph
- Architectural style: Queen Anne
- NRHP reference No.: 83001266
- Added to NRHP: July 28, 1983

The Tunxis Hose Firehouse is an historic firehouse at Lovely Street and Farmington Avenue in the center of Unionville, Connecticut. BUilt in 1893, it is a well-preserved example of a late 19th-century rural firehouse with Queen Anne Victorian features. The building was listed on the National Register of Historic Places on July 28, 1983. It presently houses a muster vehicle for Tunxis Hose Company No. 1, a local volunteer fire company.

== Description and history ==
The Tunxis Hose Firehouse is located in the center of the Unionville village of Farmington, on the east side of Lovely Street north of its junction with Main Street and Farmington Avenue. It is a two-story brick building with Queen Anne features. It has a single garage bay, a cross-gable roof with decorative corbelled brickwork below the roofline, and a three-story tower with a pyramidal roof.

The Tunxis Hose Company was founded in 1893, in response to fires at major local employers in 1890 and 1892 that threatened the community's economic vitality. Land for its firehouse was purchased that year, and this building was completed soon afterward. Its architect is unknown; the brickwork was laid by Joseph Jetner, a local mason. The building and the hand-drawn hose reel that first occupied it cost the company $4,000. In addition being used by the fire company, the building has also historically been used for social events. It served as the community's only firehouse until 1960, when a new station was built nearby. The company continues to use the building for storage and as a staging area.

== See also ==
- National Register of Historic Places listings in Hartford County, Connecticut
