= Sloper-Wesoly House =

Historic house in Connecticut, United States

- U.S. National Register of Historic Places
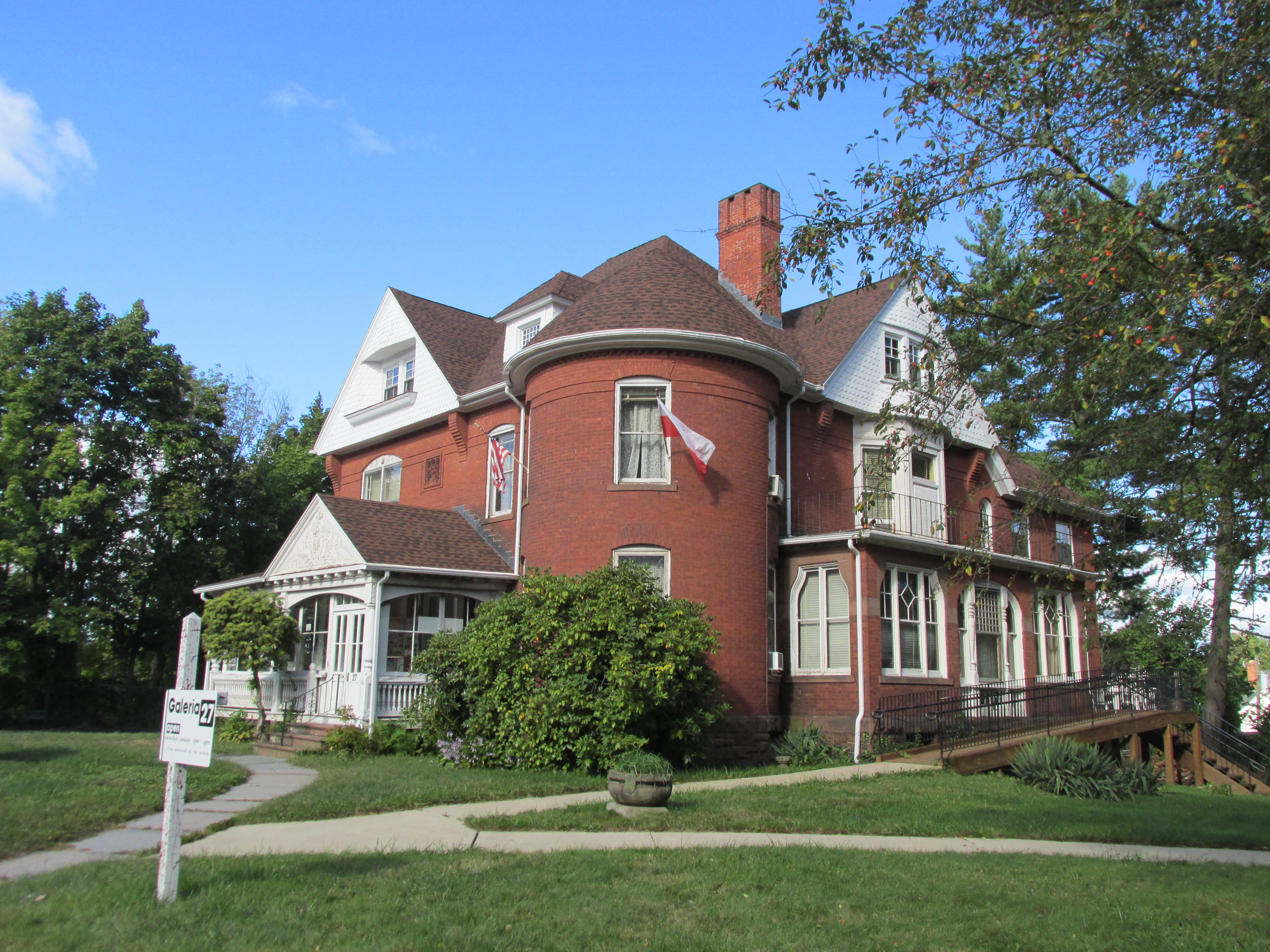

- Location within Connecticut Location within the United States
- Location: 27 Grove Hill Street, New Britain, Connecticut
- Coordinates: 41°40′0″N 72°47′30″W
- Area: less than one acre
- Built: 1887
- Architect: Rand, George Dutton
- Architectural style: Late Victorian, Queen Anne
- NRHP reference No.: 98001577
- Added to NRHP: January 7, 1999

The Sloper-Wesoly House is a historic house at 27 Grove Hill Street in New Britain, Connecticut. Built in 1887, it is a prominent local example of Queen Anne architecture in brick, and a long-standing site of importance to the city's Polish community. It was listed on the National Register of Historic Places in 1999. It now houses a local Polish cultural center.

== Description and history ==
The Sloper-Wesoly House is located in what is now a mixed commercial area west of downtown New Britain, on the east side Grove Hill Street just south of its overpass of Connecticut Route 72. It is a 2 1/2-story structure, built out of brick with a wood-framed half-story and trim. It is covered by a tall hip roof, from which a number of large gables rise. Prominent features included a round projection at the southwest corner, topped by a conical roof, and a porch extending across the rest of the front facade, with a decorated gable over the main stairs. The interior of the building has seen only modest alterations, primarily to modernize its plumbing and other infrastructure, and features a central hall finished in wood paneling and lincrusta.

The house was built in 1887 for Dr. Andrew Jackson Sloper, a prominent local businessman. It was designed by George Dutton Rand, a regionally prominent architect known for his eclectic revival-style designs. Sloper was a leading figure in promoting the recruitment of European immigrants as a source of labor for the city's growing industries, and sat on the boards of a number of its businesses. Sloper's widow sold the house to Dr. Andrew Wesoly and his wife Cecilia Kremsky Wesoly, leaders of the local Polish community. Dr. Wesoly operated his medical practice out of the first floor of the house, and the couple were instrumental in retaining the house's interior features.

== See also ==
- National Register of Historic Places listings in Hartford County, Connecticut
