= National Register of Historic Places architectural style categories =

Classifications of architecture

In the United States, the National Register of Historic Places classifies its listings by various types of architecture. Listed properties often are given one or more of 40 standard architectural style classifications that appear in the National Register Information System (NRIS) database. Other properties are given a custom architectural description with "vernacular" or other qualifiers, and others have no style classification. Many National Register-listed properties do not fit into the several categories listed here, or they fit into more specialized subcategories.

== Complete list of architectural style codes ==
The complete list of the 40 architectural style codes in the National Register Information System—NRIS follows:

Obs	ARSTYLCD	ARSTYL
1	01	NO STYLE LISTED
2	10	COLONIAL
3	11	GEORGIAN
4	20	EARLY REPUBLIC
5	21	FEDERAL
6	30	MID 19TH CENTURY REVIVAL
7	31	GREEK REVIVAL
8	32	GOTHIC REVIVAL
9	33	ITALIAN VILLA
10	34	EXOTIC REVIVAL
11	40	LATE VICTORIAN
12	41	GOTHIC
13	42	ITALIANATE
14	43	SECOND EMPIRE
15	44	STICK/EASTLAKE
16	45	QUEEN ANNE
17	46	SHINGLE STYLE
18	47	ROMANESQUE
19	48	RENAISSANCE
20	49	OCTAGON MODE
21	50	LATE 19TH AND 20TH CENTURY REVIVALS
22	51	COLONIAL REVIVAL
23	52	CLASSICAL REVIVAL
24	53	TUDOR REVIVAL
25	54	LATE GOTHIC REVIVAL
26	55	MISSION/SPANISH REVIVAL
27	56	BEAUX ARTS
28	57	PUEBLO
29	60	LATE 19TH AND EARLY 20TH CENTURY AMERICAN MOVEMENTS
30	61	PRAIRIE SCHOOL
31	62	EARLY COMMERCIAL
32	63	CHICAGO
33	64	SKYSCRAPER
34	65	BUNGALOW/CRAFTSMAN
35	70	MODERN MOVEMENT
36	71	MODERNE
37	72	INTERNATIONAL STYLE
38	73	ART DECO
39	80	OTHER
40	90	MIXED (MORE THAN 2 STYLES FROM DIFFERENT PERIODS)

== Selected NRIS styles ==
Some selected National Register Information System (NRIS) styles, with examples, include:

=== Federal architecture ===
Federal architecture was the classicizing architecture style built in the newly founded United States between c. 1780 and 1830. Examples include: the Old Town Hall in Massachusetts, and Plumb House in Virginia.

==== Greek Revival architecture ====
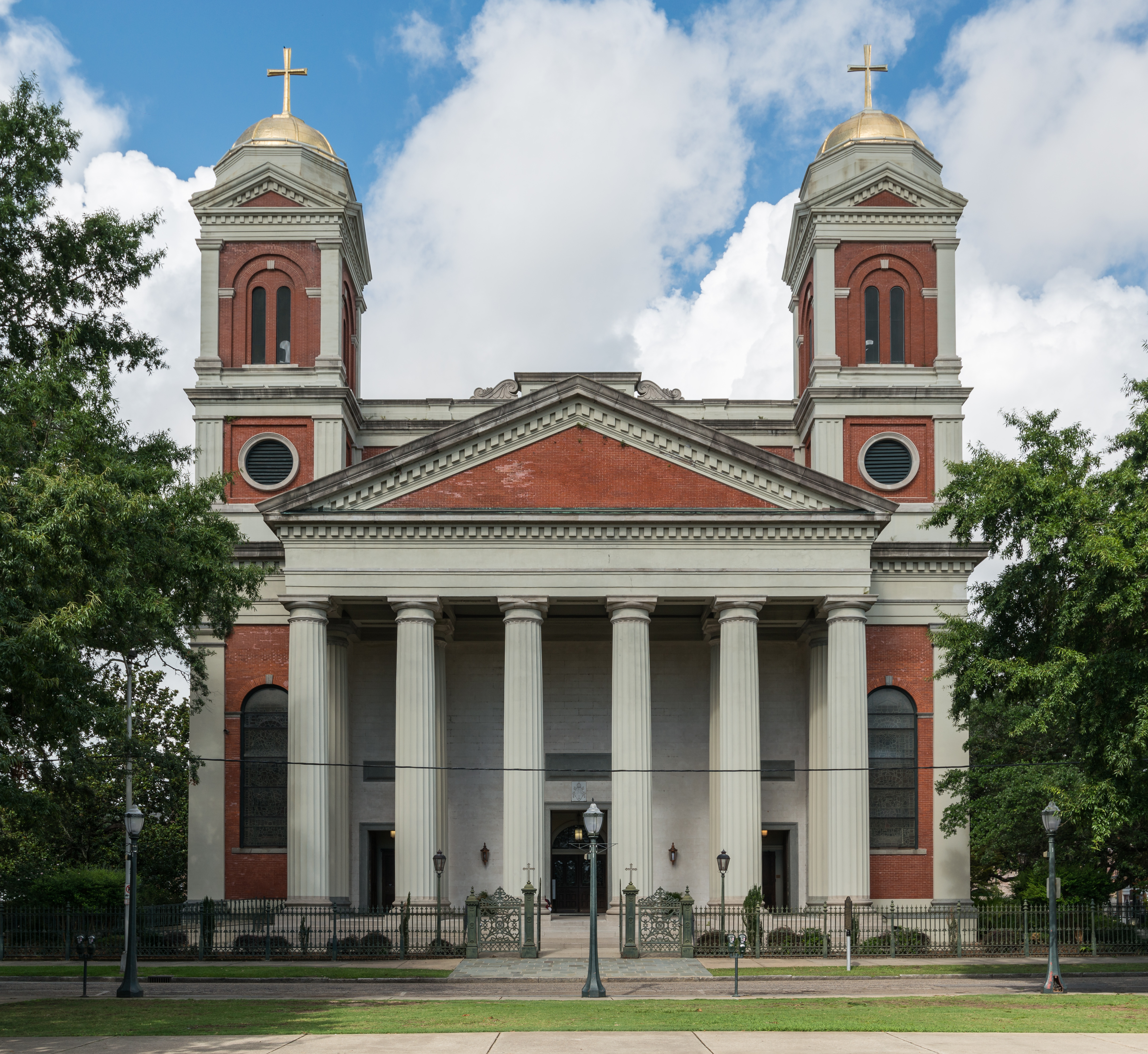
Greek Revival Cathedral Basilica of the Immaculate Conception in Mobile, Alabama

Greek Revival architecture is a Neoclassical movement of the late 18th and early 19th centuries in Europe. It emerged in the U.S. following the War of 1812 and while a revolutionary war in Greece attracted America's interest. Greek Revival architecture was popularized by Minard Lafever's pattern books: The Young Builders' General Instructor in 1829, the Modern Builders' Guide in 1833, The Beauties of Modern Architecture in 1835, and The Architectural Instructor in 1850.

Greek Revival in the U.S. includes vernacular versions such as the 1839 Simsbury Townhouse built by an unknown craftsman and the Dicksonia Plantation, and high-style versions such as the Second Bank of the United States, Philadelphia.

Plantation houses

Many plantation houses in the Southern United States were built in Greek Revival variations, including Millford Plantation, Melrose, Gaineswood, and Annandale Plantation

==== Palladian Revival architecture ====
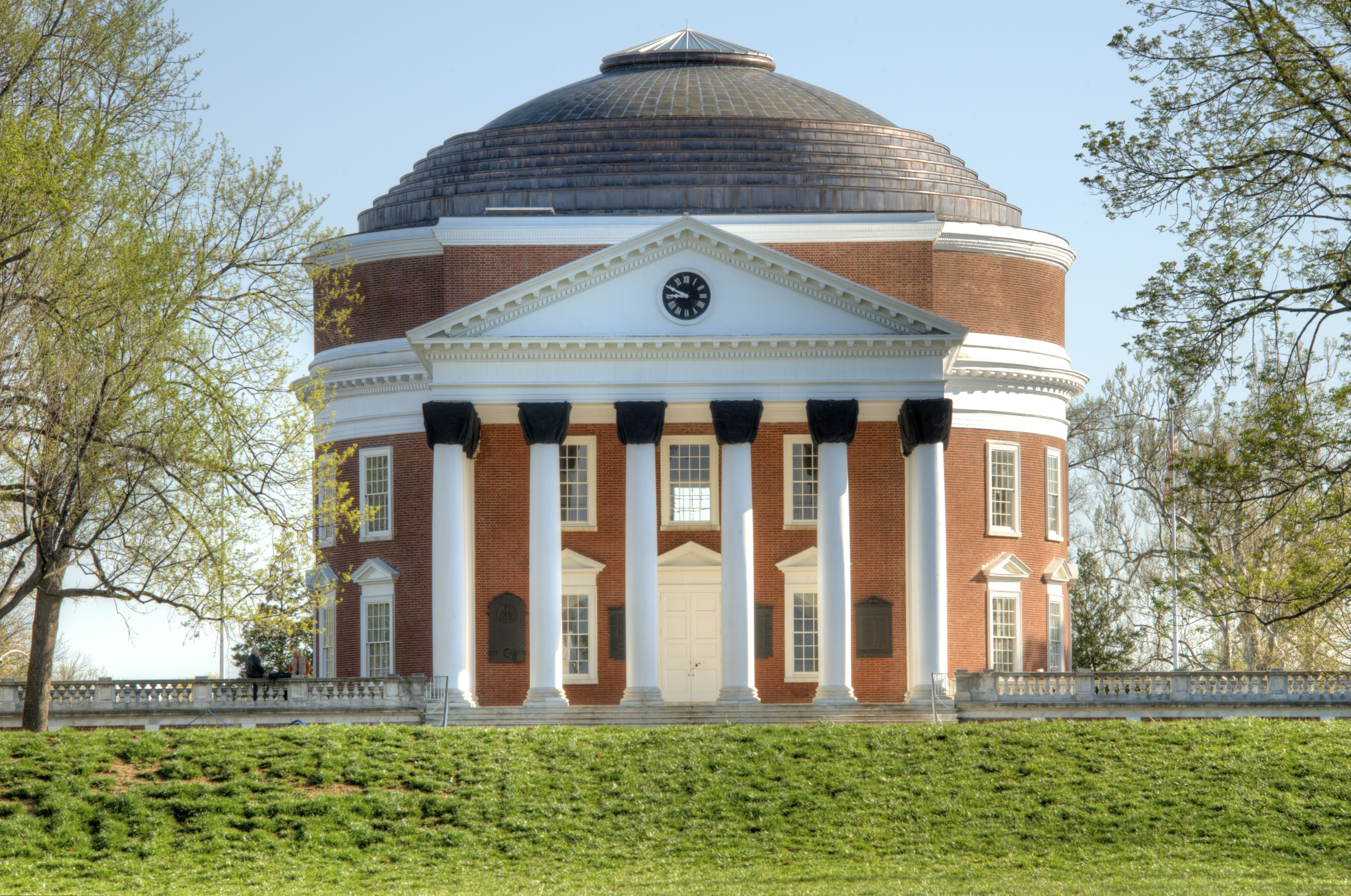
The Palladian Rotunda, Virginia

Examples of the American revival of classical Palladian architecture include: The Rotunda by Thomas Jefferson at the University of Virginia, and the Hammond-Harwood House in Annapolis, Maryland.

=== Late Victorian architecture ===
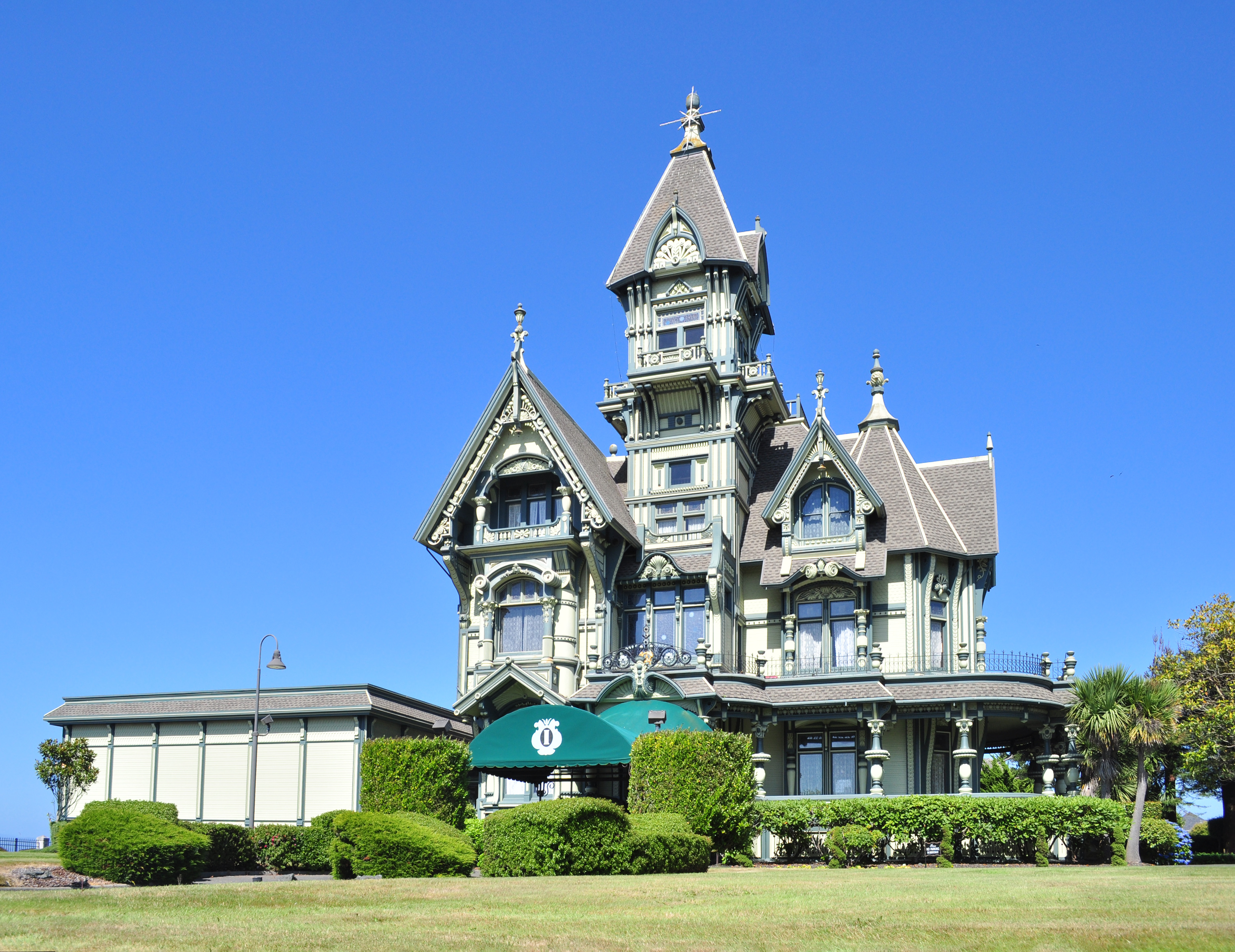
Late Victorian Carson Mansion in Eureka, California.

Late Victorian architecture is widely distributed on the register's listings, for many building types in every state. The Carpenter Gothic style was popular for Late Victorian wooden churches.

==== Queen Anne ====
The Queen Anne style was popular in later American Victorian architecture, after the earlier Italianate style, and is frequent on NRHP residential listings. The Shingle Style is an American variation of Queen Anne.

=== Late 19th and 20th Century Revivals ===
A grouping of historicist architecture Revival styles, with the title Late 19th and 20th Century Revivals, has been applied by the NRHP for many listings. There are numerous listed buildings designed in an amalgam of several to many revival styles that defy a singular or simpler classification title.

=== Mission/Spanish Revival ===
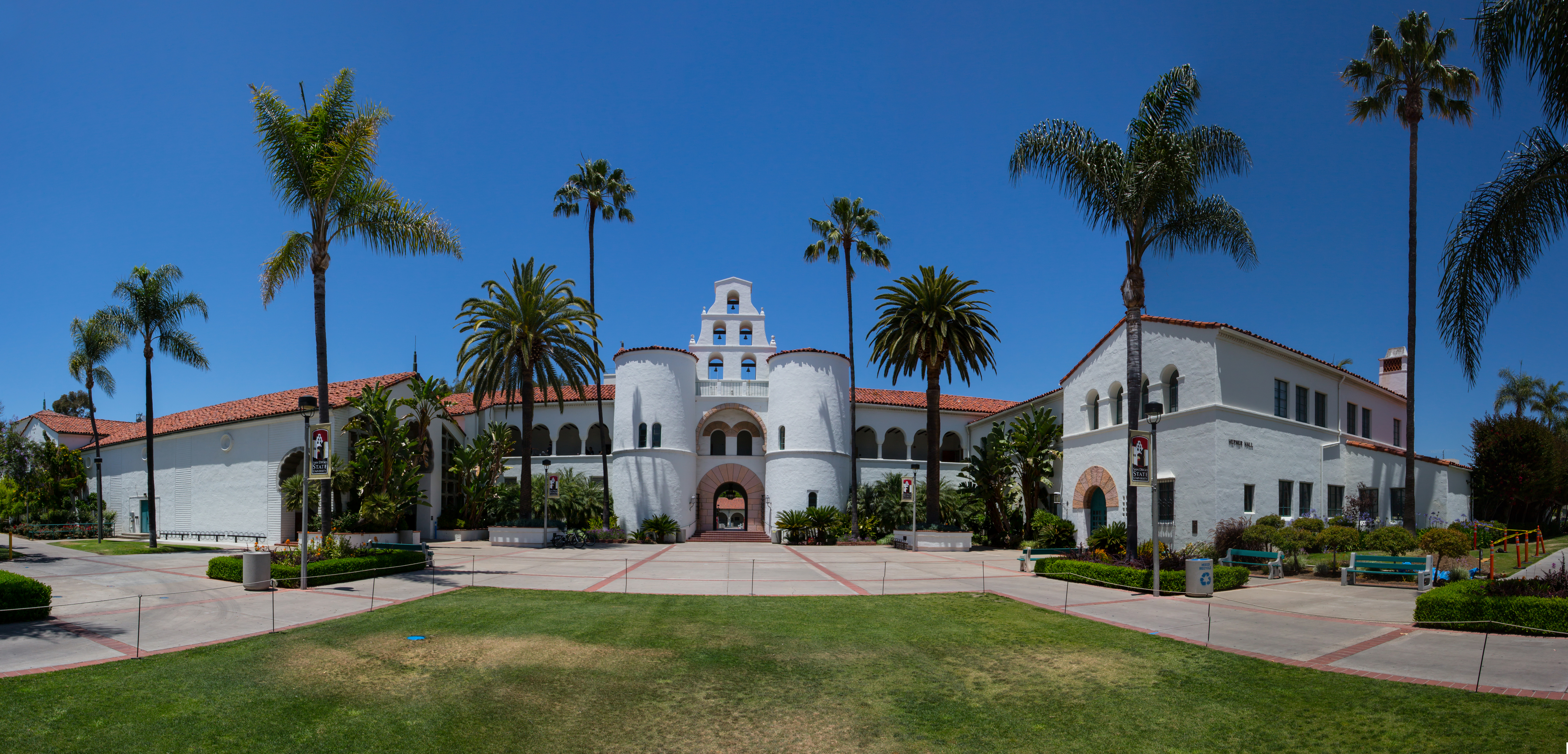
Mission Revival architecture at San Diego State University, California

Mission/Spanish Revival is an amalgam of two distinct styles popular in different but adjacent eras: the primarily late-19th-century Mission Revival Style architecture and early-20th-century (and later) Spanish Colonial Revival architecture. The combined term, or the individual terms, are often used in the style classifications of NRHP listed buildings.

=== Pueblo Revival ===
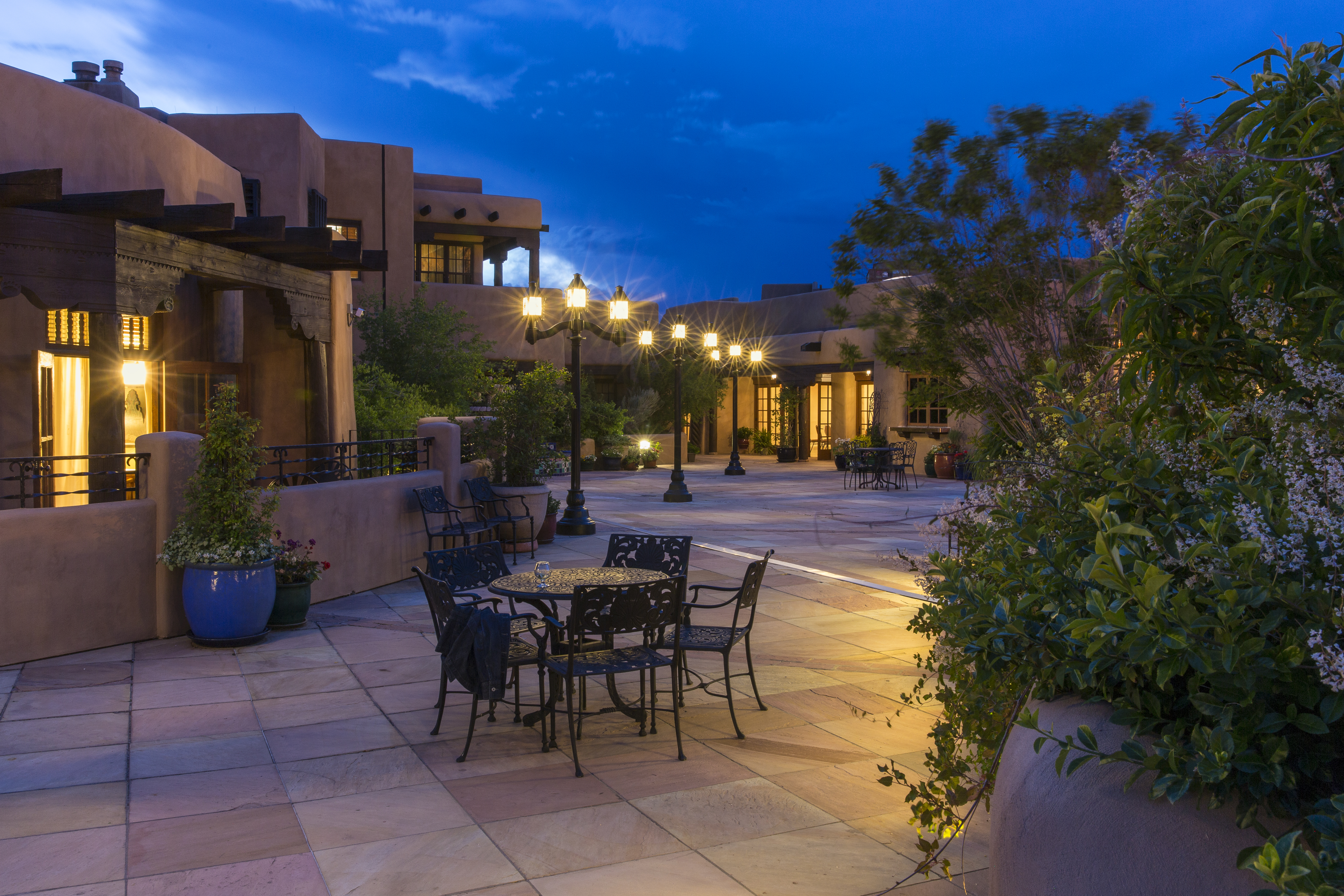
Pueblo Revival La Fonda on the Plaza in Santa Fe, New Mexico

Pueblo Revival Style architecture is a revival style based on traditional Native American Pueblo architecture of adobe dwellings–communities in the Pueblo culture, primarily in present-day New Mexico, northeastern Arizona, and southwestern Colorado.

Examples include the Institute of American Indian Arts, La Fonda on the Plaza, and the Mabel Dodge Luhan House in New Mexico, and the Painted Desert Inn in Arizona.

=== Exotic Revival architecture ===
Exotic Revival architecture is another style that may reflect a mix of Moorish Revival architecture, Egyptian Revival architecture, and other influences. National Register-listed places identified with this style include El Zaribah Shrine Auditorium, Odd Fellows Rest Cemetery, Fort Smith Masonic Temple, and Algeria Shrine Temple.

Examples in California include Hompa Hongwanji Buddhist Temple in downtown Los Angeles, Grauman's Chinese Theatre and Egyptian Theatre in Hollywood, the Citadel Outlets in Commerce, and the Rosicrucian Egyptian Museum in San Jose.

==== Mayan Revival ====
The Mayan Revival architecture style frequently blends Maya architectural and artistic motifs with those of other Mesoamerican cultures, particularly of Aztec architecture.

Examples include the Mayan Theater in downtown Los Angeles, the Hollyhock House by Frank Lloyd Wright in East Hollywood, and the Aztec Hotel on U.S. Route 66 in Southern California.

=== Postmedieval English ===
"Postmedieval English" architecture is a style term used for a number of NRHP listings, including William Ward Jr. House in Middlefield, Connecticut.

=== Late 19th and Early 20th Century American Movements ===
"Late 19th and Early 20th Century American Movements" are revival styles and other American architectural movements, that originated during increasing development in the United States during the Second Industrial Revolution of the late 19th century, and continuing development and urbanization during the early 20th century before World War I.

Arts

'American Movements' is a broader design and art movement phrase used in the visual arts of the United States. It refers to U.S. centric art and design movements that originated during any century of the country's history.

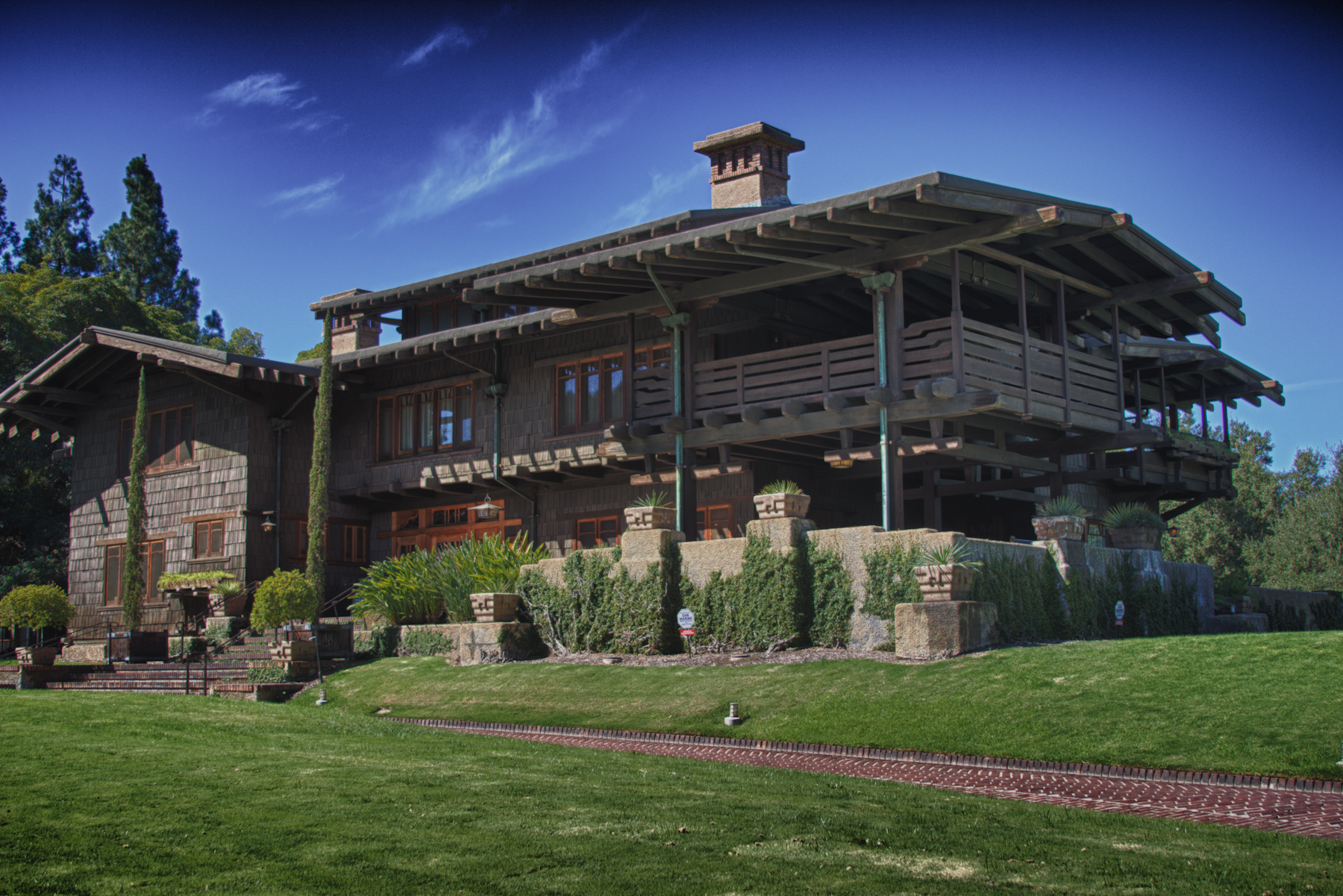
Gamble House, an American Craftsman style bungalow, California.

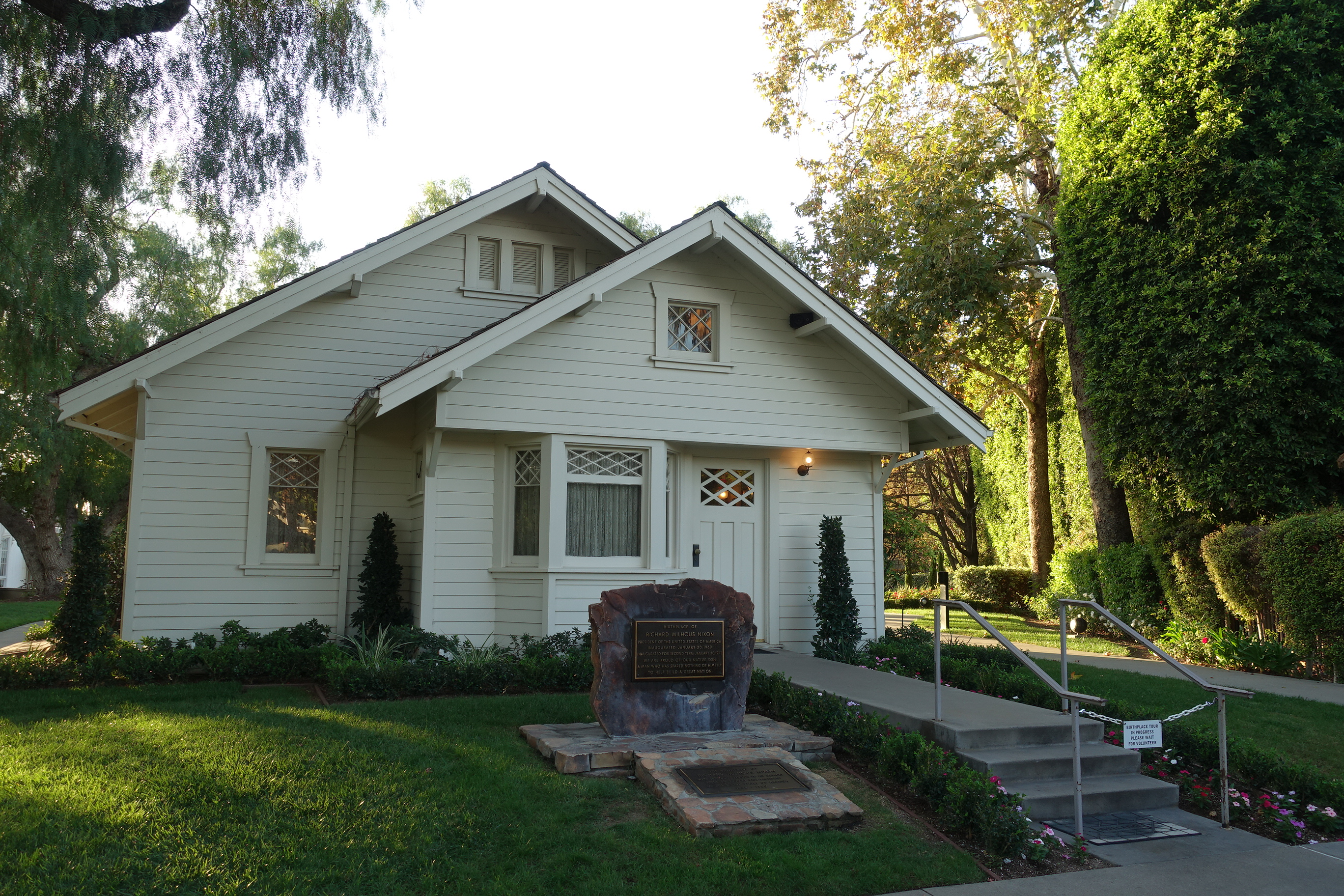
Richard Nixon's birthplace bungalow.

=== Bungalow/Craftsman ===
Bungalow/Craftsman is a term commonly appearing in NRHP listings, which reflects American Craftsman and Bungalow styles.

American Craftsman is often a term used for the Arts and Crafts movement works and philosophy expressed in the United States. It can include domestic architecture, interior design, landscape design, applied arts, decorative arts, and the fine arts. Many Craftsman and other style influenced California bungalow houses were popular and built nationwide into the 1930s.

Very large and well detailed custom residences are described as ultimate bungalows, such as the works by Greene and Greene in California. Examples include: the Gamble House in Pasadena, and the Thorsen House in Berkeley. Smaller American Craftsman homes include: Batchelder House and Holmes-Shannon House. Bungalow examples include the Birthplace of Richard Nixon and the Lanterman House. Bungalow courts include: Palmetto Court and Gartz Court.

=== Early Commercial ===
There are hundreds of National Register-listed buildings of the Early Commercial architecture type.

==== Plains Commercial ====
Plains Commercial architecture and Plains Commercial Style is another variant of the Chicago School style.

== See also ==
- National Register of Historic Places property types
- Index: American architectural styles
