= Simsbury Bank and Trust Company Building =

- U.S. National Register of Historic Places
- U.S. Historic district – Contributing property
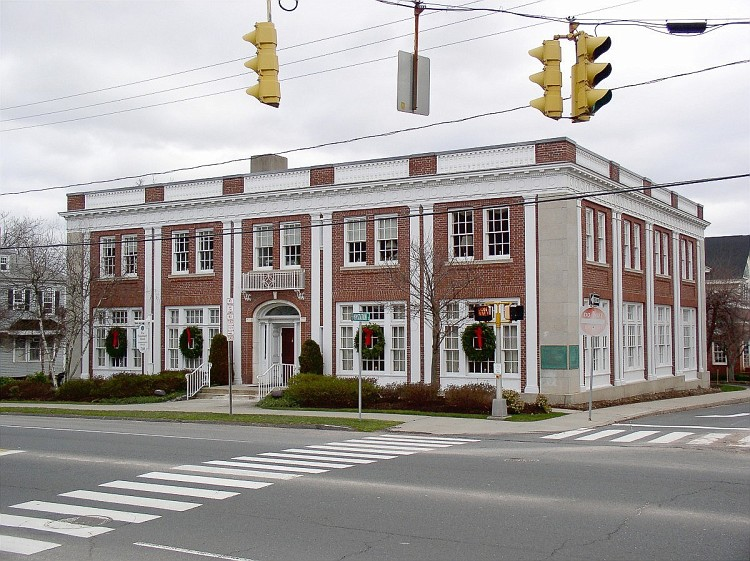

- Location within Connecticut Location within the United States
- Location: 760 Hopmeadow Street, Simsbury, Connecticut
- Coordinates: 41°52′31″N 72°48′6″W
- Area: less than one acre
- Built: 1917
- Architect: Smith & Bassette
- Architectural style: Colonial Revival
- Part of: Simsbury Center Historic District (ID96000356)
- NRHP reference No.: 86003323

Significant dates
- Added to NRHP: November 20, 1986
- Designated CP: April 12, 1996

The Simsbury Bank and Trust Company Building, also known as the former Town Hall Building, is a historic commercial and civic building at 760 Hopmeadow Street in Simsbury, Connecticut. Built in 1917, it is a prominent local example of Colonial Revival architecture with Beaux Arts features. It originally housed the town's first bank, and was its town hall between 1969 and 1984. The building was listed on the National Register of Historic Places in 1986.

== Description and history ==
The Simsbury Bank and Trust Company Building occupies a prominent position in Simsbury's town center, at the northeast corner of Hopmeadow and Station Streets. It is a two-story Colonial Revival brick building. The roughly square building has a 72-foot (22 m) facade, divided into five bays by paired fluted pilasters topped by rosettes. Pilasters at the corners rest on stone piers. The main entrance, centered on the facade, is recessed in a paneled archway, topped by a semi-elliptical fanlight and framed by very thin columns and leaded sidelight windows. The building has a richly decorated entablature, and its roof perimeter has a low balustrade, interrupted by brick piers.

The building was built for Joseph Ensign, a local businessman, in 1917 to a design by the Hartford architectural firm of Smith & Bassette. In addition to housing the Simsbury Bank and Trust Company (founded 1916), it also housed local telephone company offices for many years, as well as a variety of retail tenants. The building was occupied by the bank until 1969, when it was sold to the town. It served as town hall from then until 1984, and is once again used for commercial purposes.

== See also ==
- Eno Memorial Hall, also designed by Bassette, located across Station Street
- National Register of Historic Places listings in Hartford County, Connecticut
