= Simsbury Townhouse =

- U.S. National Register of Historic Places
- U.S. Historic district – Contributing property
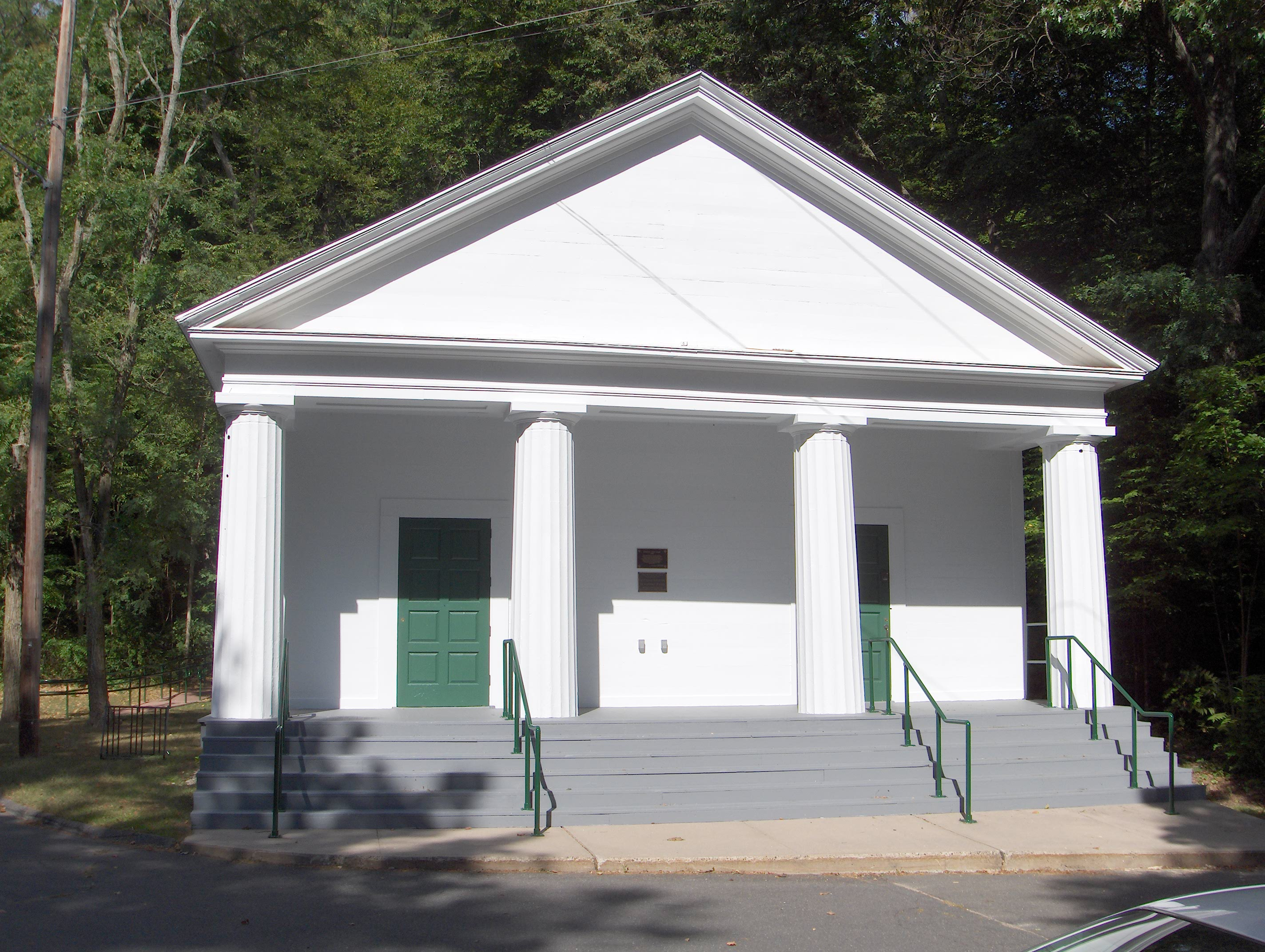

- Location within Connecticut Location within the United States
- Location: 695 Hopmeadow Street, Simsbury, Connecticut
- Coordinates: 41°52′18″N 72°48′17″W
- Area: 0.6 acres (0.24 ha)
- Built: 1839
- Architectural style: Greek Revival
- Part of: Simsbury Center Historic District (ID96000356)
- NRHP reference No.: 93000209

Significant dates
- Added to NRHP: April 2, 1993
- Designated CP: April 12, 1996

The Simsbury Townhouse is a historic municipal building at 695 Hopmeadow Street in Simsbury, Connecticut. Built in 1839, it was Simsbury's town hall until 1931, and is a good local example of Greek Revival architecture. It was listed on the National Register of Historic Places in 1993. It continues to serve as a community resource.

== Description and history ==
The Simsbury Townhouse is located near the southern end of Simsbury's downtown area, just north of the First Church of Christ on the west side of Hopmeadow Street. It is a single-story wood frame structure, with a gabled roof and clapboarded exterior. Its front facade is dominated by a projecting Greek temple portico, with fluted columns supporting an entablature and fully pedimented gable. The front facade sheltered by this portico is finished in flushboarding, and has a pair of symmetrically placed entrances. The interior consists of a large chamber with a stage at the far end. The walls have horizontally laid wainscoting to a height of four feet, and are plastered above. The ceiling is finished in wooden beadboard.

Until the early 19th century, Simsbury's town meetings were held in the local Congregational church. When the congregation built a new church in 1833, it voted to disallow use of the space for town meetings, bringing about the need for a town hall. Town meetings were held in a variety of other spaces until this structure was built in 1839. It was originally located at the top of the hill near its present location, and was moved twice, once in 1843, and finally in 1869 to its present site. Although it was not formally referred to as such until 1882, it served from its construction until 1931 as town hall, when they moved to the new Eno Memorial Hall. It was adapted for other recreational uses by the early 20th century, and was rented to the local Boy Scout organization in 1934. It continues to be owned by the town today, and is available for rent.

== See also ==
- National Register of Historic Places listings in Hartford County, Connecticut
