= Horace Belden School and Central Grammar School =

- U.S. National Register of Historic Places
- U.S. Historic district – Contributing property
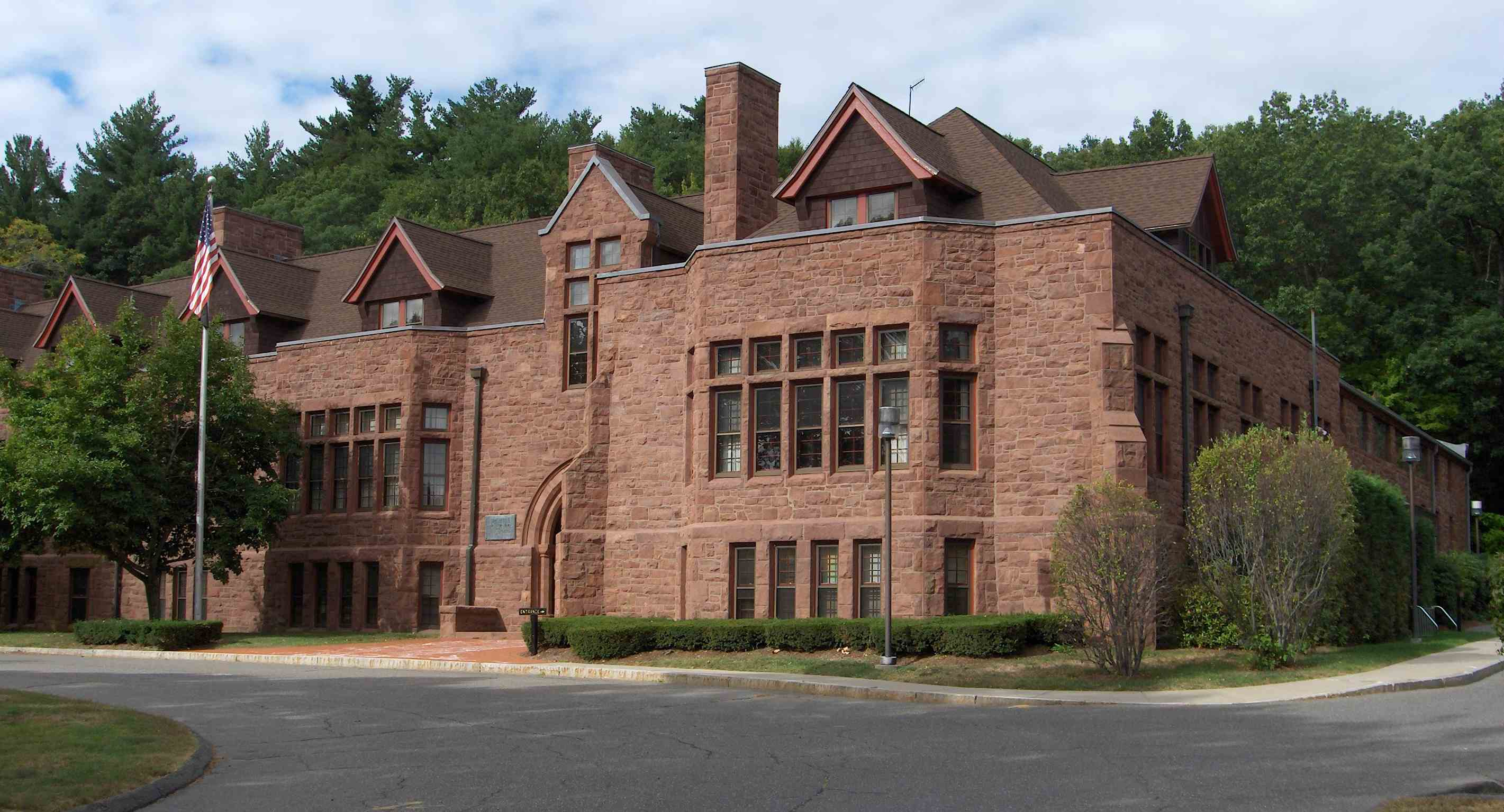

- Location within Connecticut Location within the United States
- Location: 933 Hopmeadow Street and 29 Massaco Street, Simsbury, Connecticut
- Coordinates: 41°52′49″N 72°48′03″W
- Area: 12 acres (4.9 ha)
- Built: 1907
- Architect: Hapgood, Edward T.; Ketchin, William
- Architectural style: Late Gothic Revival architecture
- Part of: Simsbury Center Historic District (ID96000356)
- NRHP reference No.: 93000211

Significant dates
- Added to NRHP: March 25, 1993
- Designated CP: April 12, 1996

The Horace Belden School and Central Grammar School are a pair of architecturally distinguished Late Gothic Revival occupying a single campus at 933 Hopmeadow Street and 29 Massaco Street in Simsbury, Connecticut. The Belden School was built in 1907 as the first Simsbury High School, and now serves as Simsbury Town Hall. The Central Grammar School, built in 1913, is now called the Central School. The buildings were listed as a pair on the National Register of Historic Places in 1993 for their architecture and their role in the town's educational system.

== Description and history ==
The two school buildings are located north of Simsbury's central business district, on a parcel of land bounded on the north by Massaco Street and the east by Hopmeadow Street (United States Route 202), with commercial property occupying the street corner. Both are two-story buildings, with ashlar brownstone walls, and predominantly Gothic Revival styling. The former Belden School, now Town Hall, faces Hopmeadow Street. It has its main entrance in a Gothic-arched recess, and has bands of sash windows topped by transom windows set into separate openings. There are broad projecting sections in several parts of the facade, and large gabled dormers with slightly flared roof lines projecting from the hip roof. The main section of the school was built in 1907, with an additions in 1927 and 1961. It has served as the town hall since 1983. 3 The Central School faces north to Massaco Street. Its original section, built in 1913, is L-shaped, and also has entrances set in Gothic openings. Its roof gables are adorned with parapets. Unlike the Belden School building, whose interior has been extensively altered, its interior retains many original finishes. A Colonial Revival extension was added in 1949-50.

Both schools came about through the financial support of Horace Belden, a Simsbury native whose grandfather had made a fortune in merchant trade with the West Indies. Belden's philanthropy, in addition to funding the schools, also paid for the local water company, and for the improvement of town roads. The schools were built as part of the town's consolidation of district schools into centralized facilities, and were designed at a time when schools were expected to be monuments to education, and to reflect European educational traditions. The Collegiate Gothic style in which these are built was seen to fulfil these expectations.

The Belden School originally served as the town's high school, and also served the students of surrounding towns. Overcrowding in the mid-20th century prompted construction of a high school wing onto the junior high school in 1955, and Belden was converted into a grammar school, a role it served until 1980. Shuttered for a number of years, it was adapted for use as town hall in 1983.

== See also ==
- National Register of Historic Places listings in Hartford County, Connecticut
