= Simsbury Center Historic District =

Historic district in Connecticut, United States

- U.S. National Register of Historic Places
- U.S. Historic district
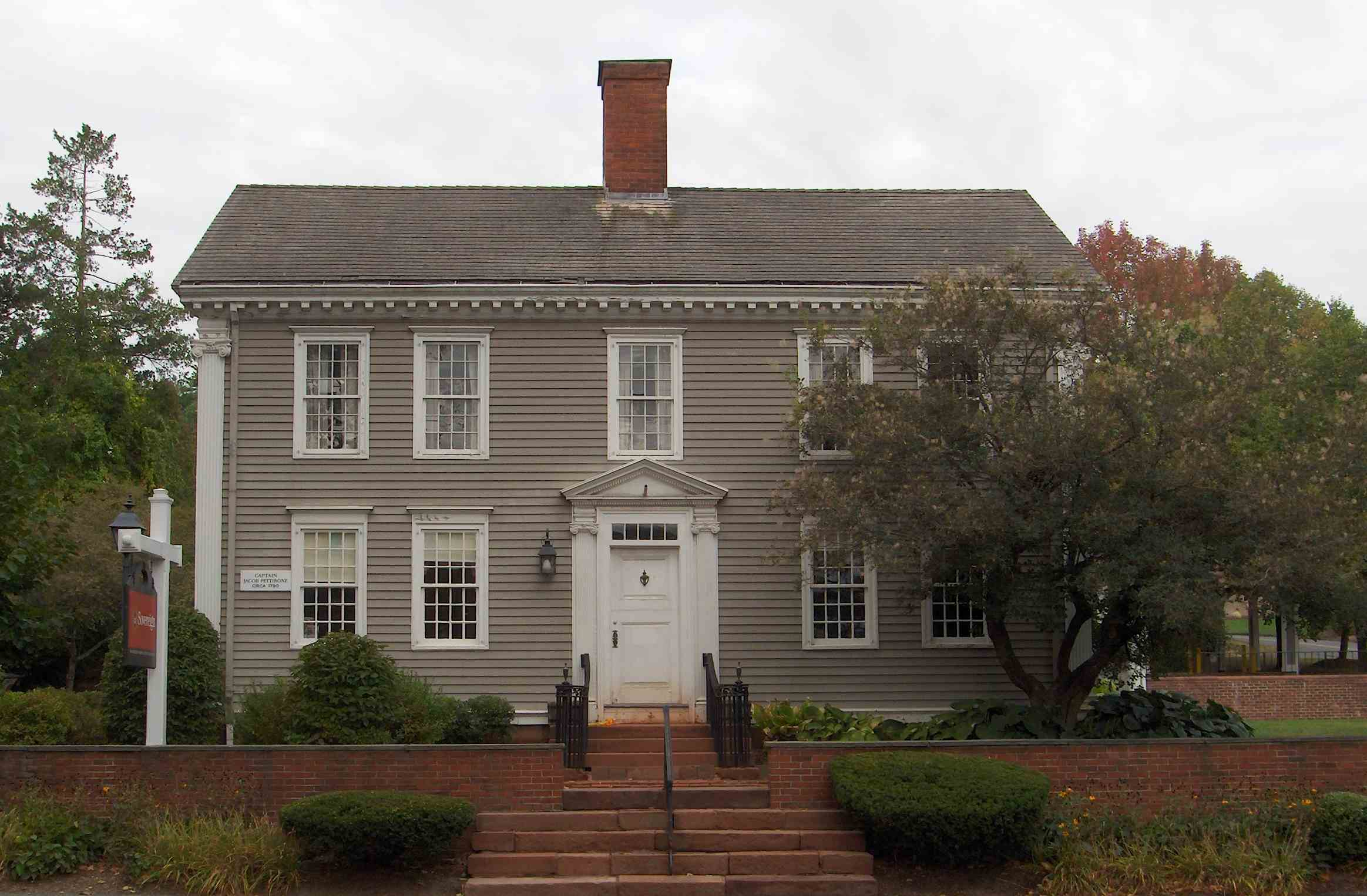
- Captain Jacob Pettibone House, in 2010

- Location within Connecticut Location within the United States
- Location: Roughly, Hopmeadow Street from West Street to Massaco Street, Simsbury, Connecticut
- Coordinates: 41°52′31″N 72°48′11″W
- Area: 75 acres (30 ha)
- Architect: Keller, George, et al.; Hapgood, Melvin P., et al.
- Architectural style: Colonial, Early Republic, Late Victorian
- NRHP reference No.: 96000356
- Added to NRHP: April 12, 1996

The Simsbury Center Historic District is a 75-acre (30 ha) historic district located in the town center area of Simsbury, Connecticut. It encompasses seven blocks of Hopmeadow Street, as well as the cluster of commercial, civic, and residential buildings along Railroad, Station, and Wilcox Streets, and Phelps Lane. Although its oldest element is the cemetery (established 1688), most of its buildings were built in the late 19th and early 20th century. It was listed on the National Register of Historic Places in 1996.

== History ==
Simsbury, originally the location of a Native American settlement called Massaco, was acquired by English colonists in the 1650s, and settled beginning in the 1660s. Originally part of Windsor, it was formally incorporated by the Connecticut Colony in 1670. Hopmeadow Street (now signed United States Route 202) developed as the major north-south route on the west side of the Farmington River, and the town center grew near an early ferry crossing. The majority of the district's surviving 18th and early 19th-century buildings are houses, most of which have been adapted for commercial use. The district derives its character from a larger number of late 19th and 20th-century buildings, general of a civic or commercial nature. Prominent examples include Eno Memorial Hall and the Simsbury Bank and Trust Company Building; the latter, built in 1917, is one of three buildings in the district to serve as town hall. Both were designed by Smith & Bassette, a prominent Hartford architectural firm.

The district is essentially linear in nature, extending along Hopmeadow Street between West Street and Massaco Street. It extends eastward in the central section, to include development between Hopmeadow Street and the railroad, including the c. 1875 Simsbury Railroad Depot. The northern end of the district is anchored by the Horace Belden School and Central Grammar School complex, which now includes the town offices.

== Contributing buildings ==
- Simsbury Free Library, 1887, 749 Hopmeadow Street (see #1 in photos accompanying NRHP nomination)
- Eno Memorial Hall, 1932, 754 Hopmeadow Street, Colonial Revival architecture
- Pettibone House, c. 1790, 741 Hopmeadow Street, a five bay central-chimney house modified later to Colonial Revival style

- First Church of Christ, 689 Hopmeadow Street
- 750-760 Hopmeadow Street (the Simsbury Bank and Trust Company Building)
- Simsbury Center Cemetery, 755 Hopmeadow Street
- 783-835 Hopmeadow Street
- Methodist Episcopal Church, 799 Hopmeadow Street
- Massacoh Plantation, 800 Hopmeadow Street
- Titus Barber House, 920 Hopmeadow Street
- Horace Belden School / Simsbury Town Office Building, 933 Hopmeadow Street
- Bronze plaque at Pent Road
- St. Mary's Church and Rectory, 944 and 940 Hopmeadow Street
- The Simsbury Railroad Depot, Railroad and Station Streets

== Gallery ==
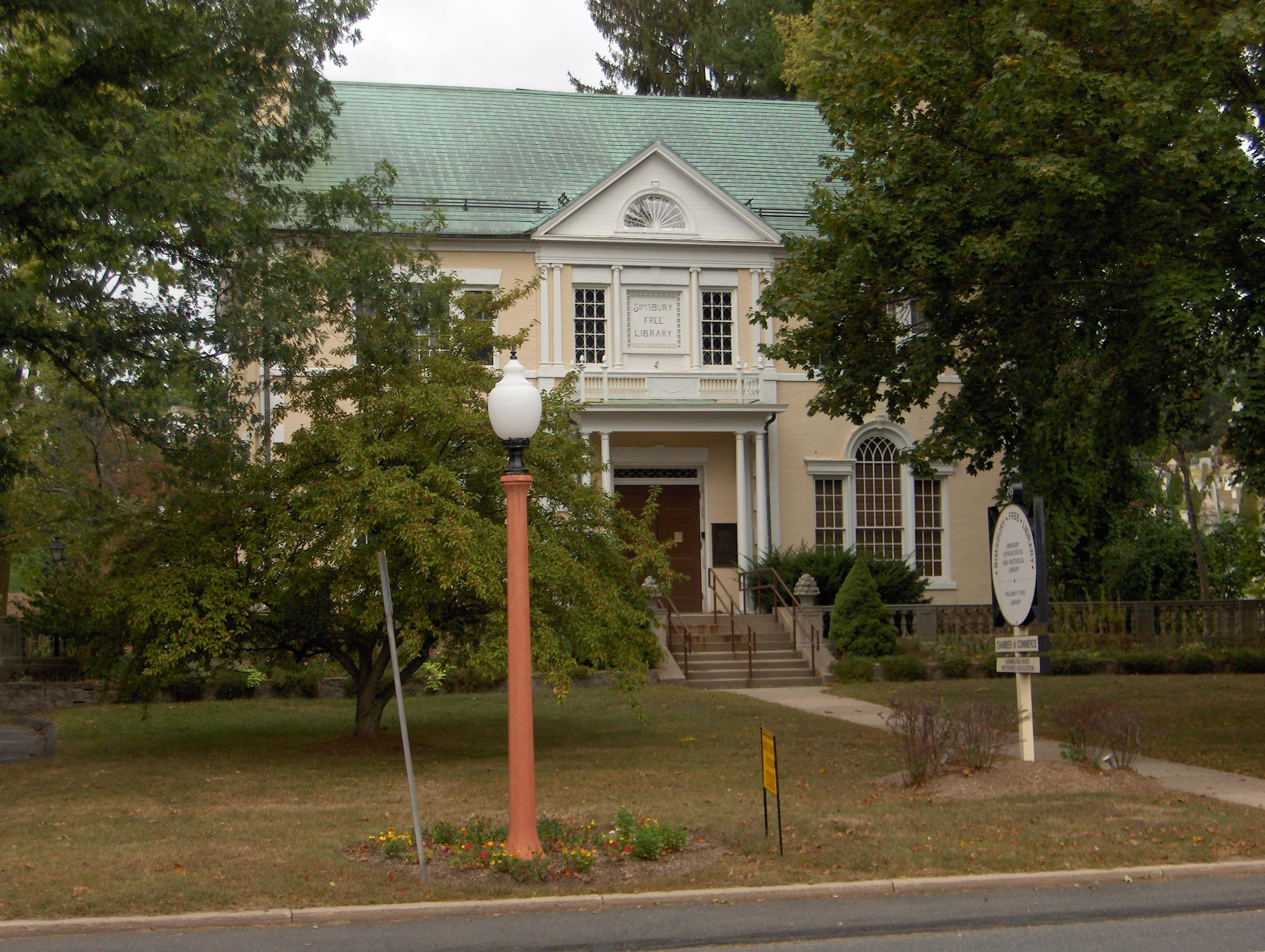
Simsbury Free Library

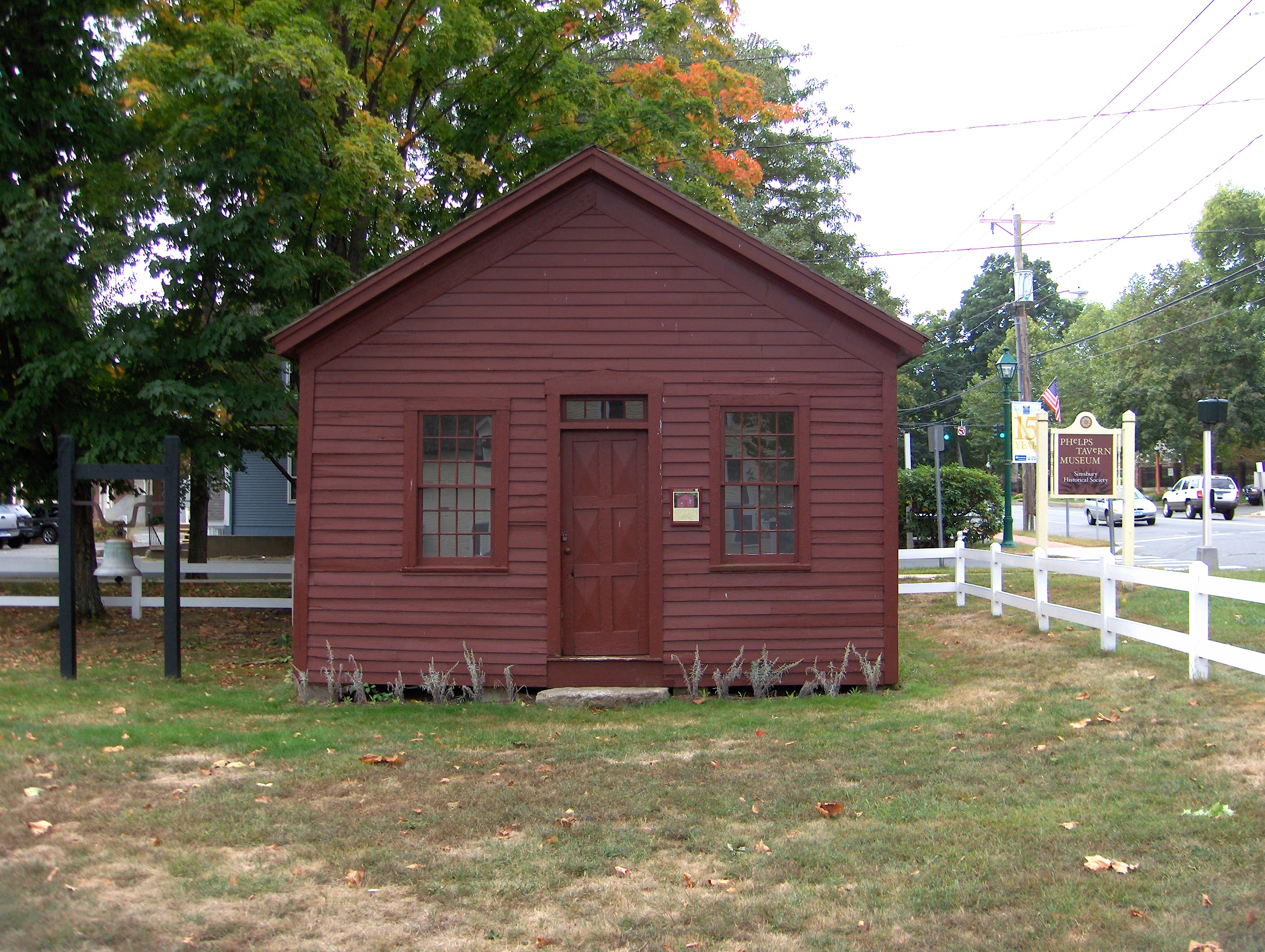
Schoolhouse

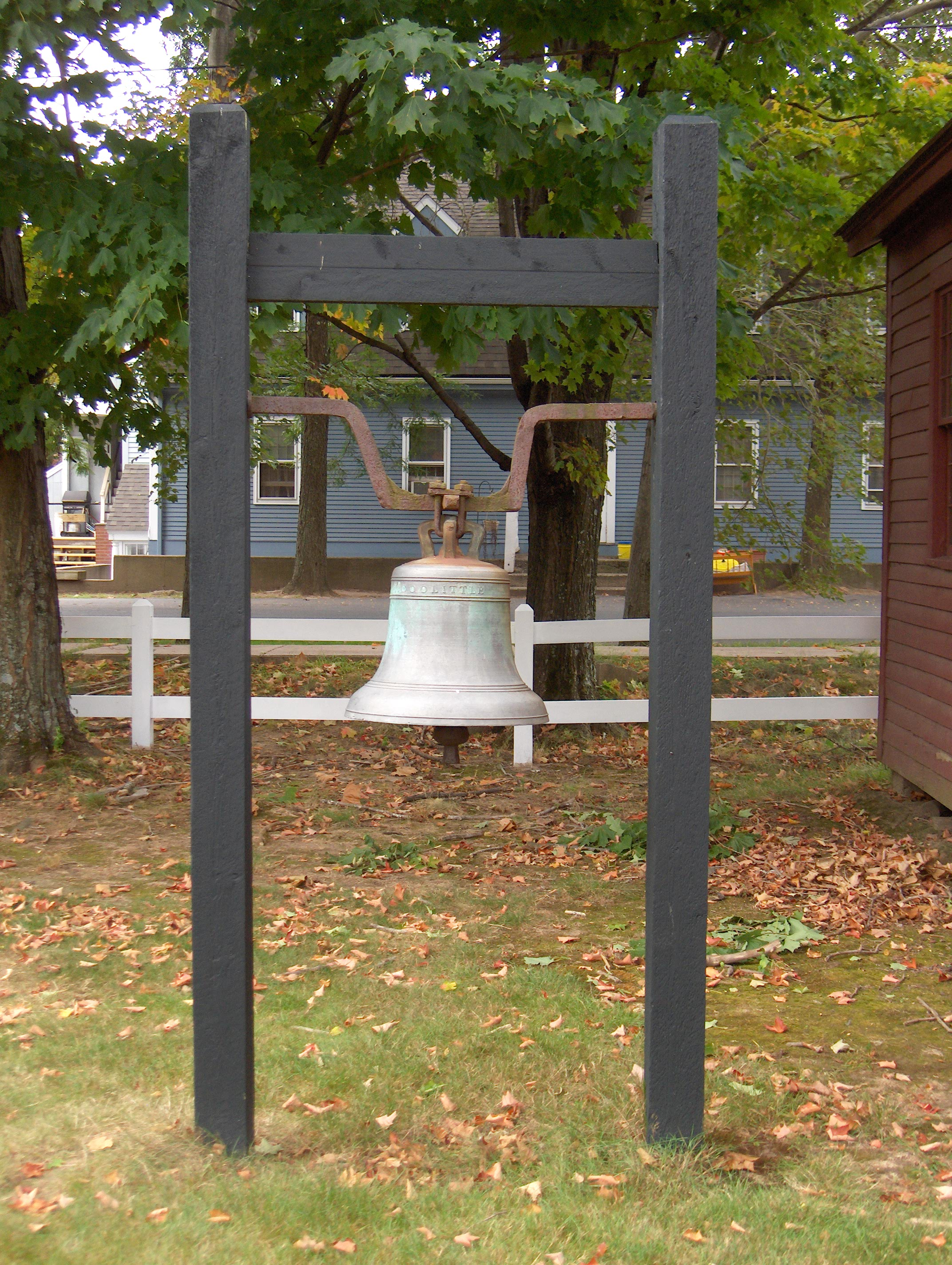
Schoolhouse bell

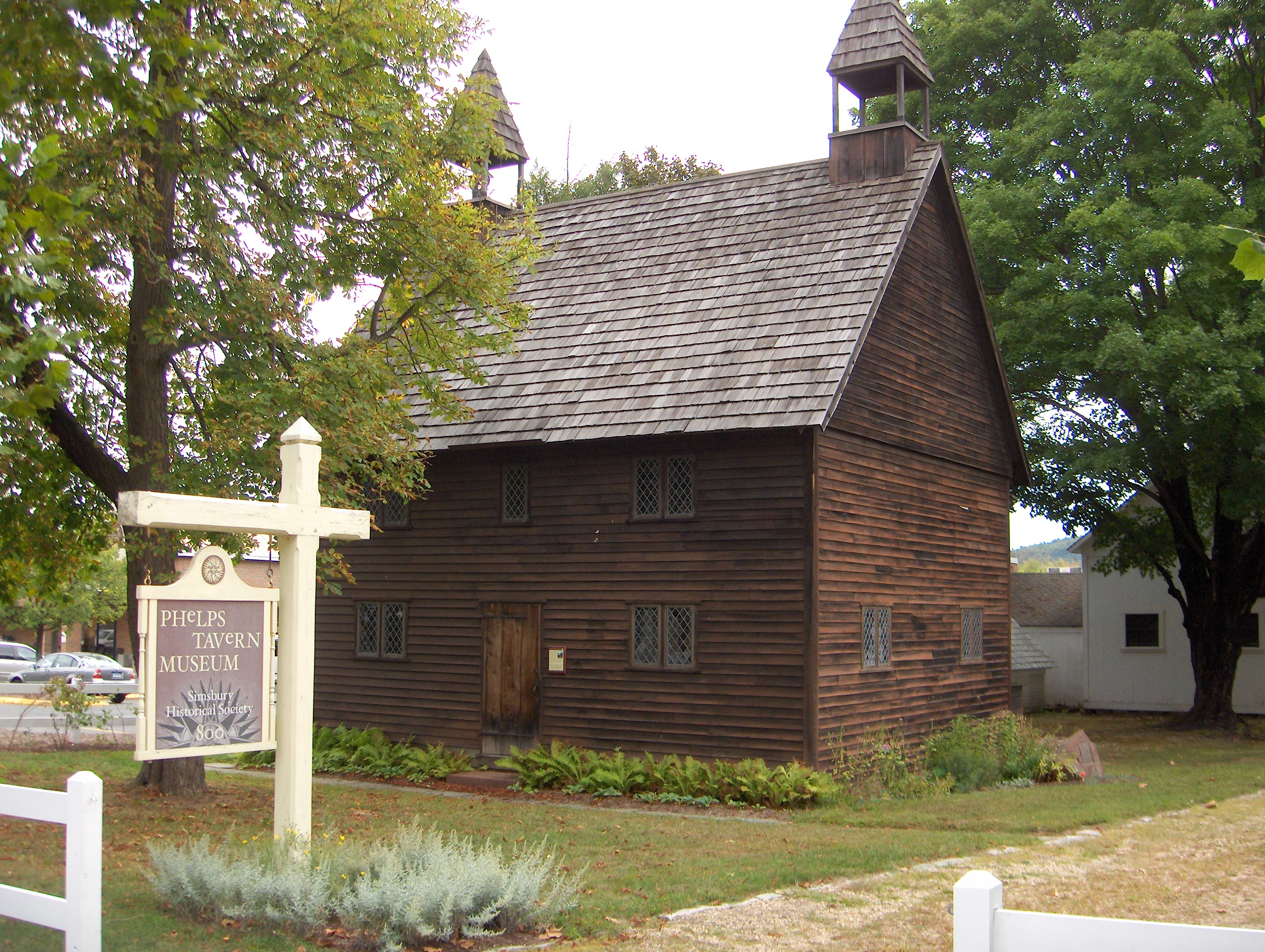
Meetinghouse

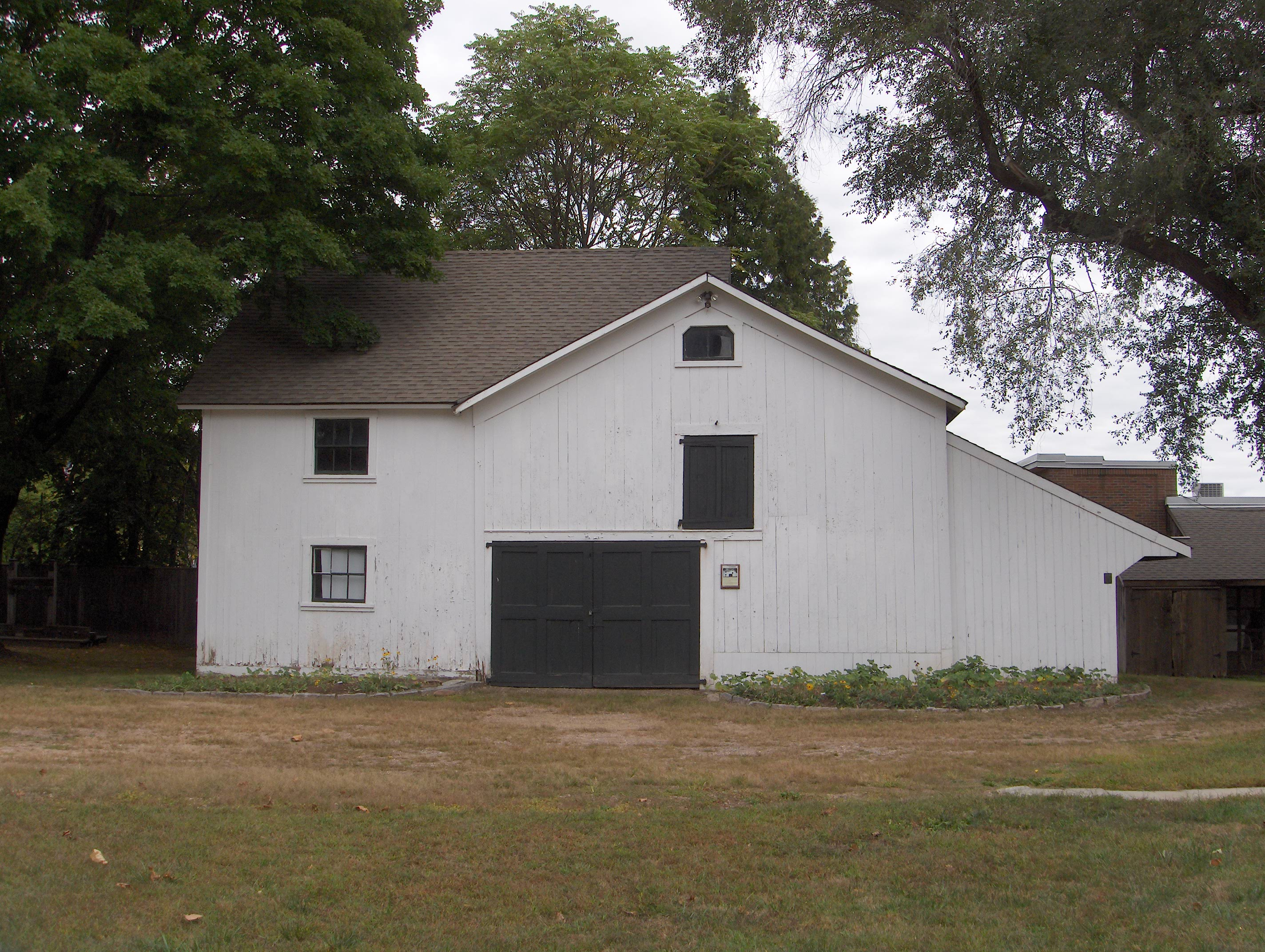
Barn

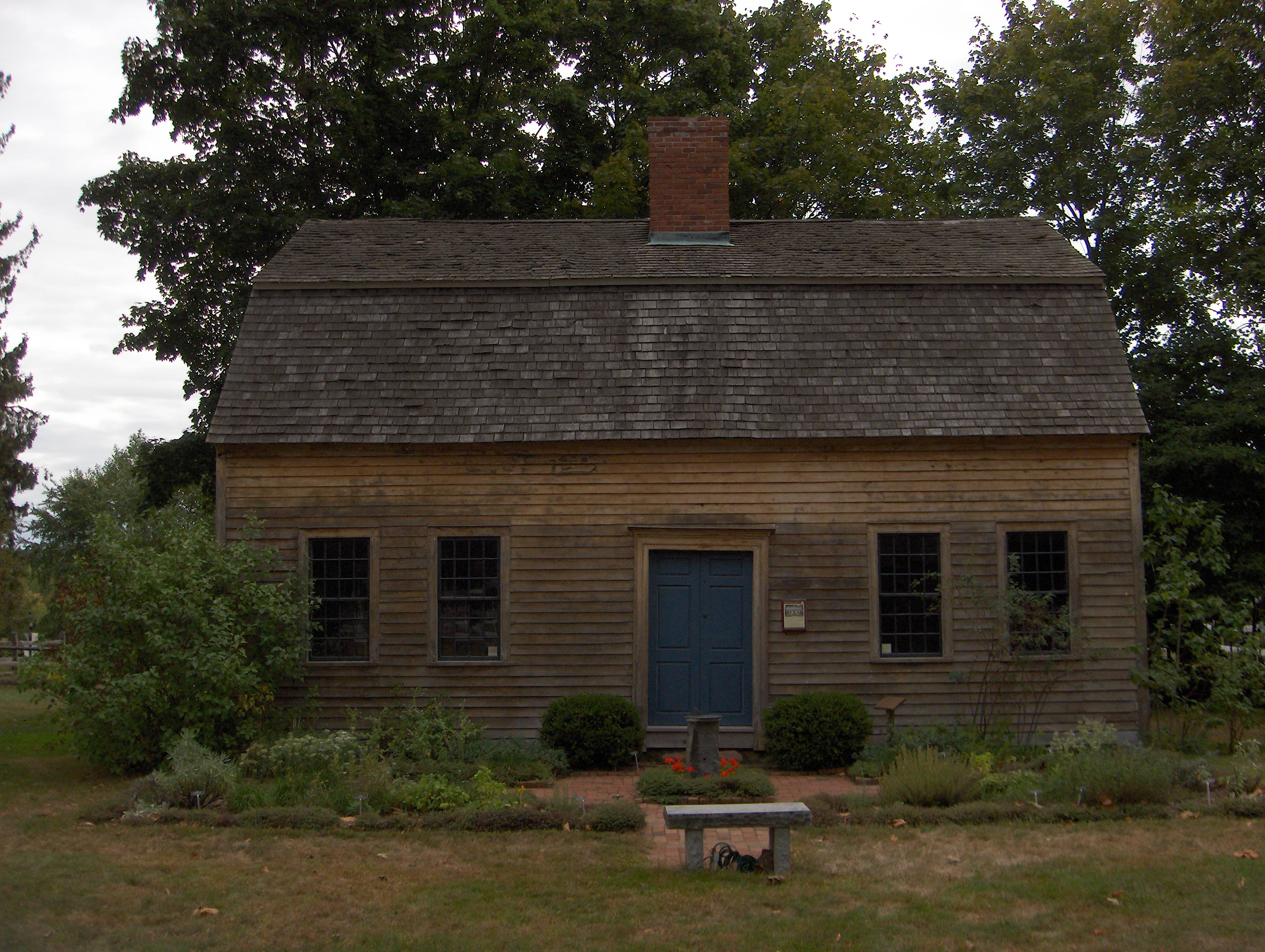
18th Century Cottage

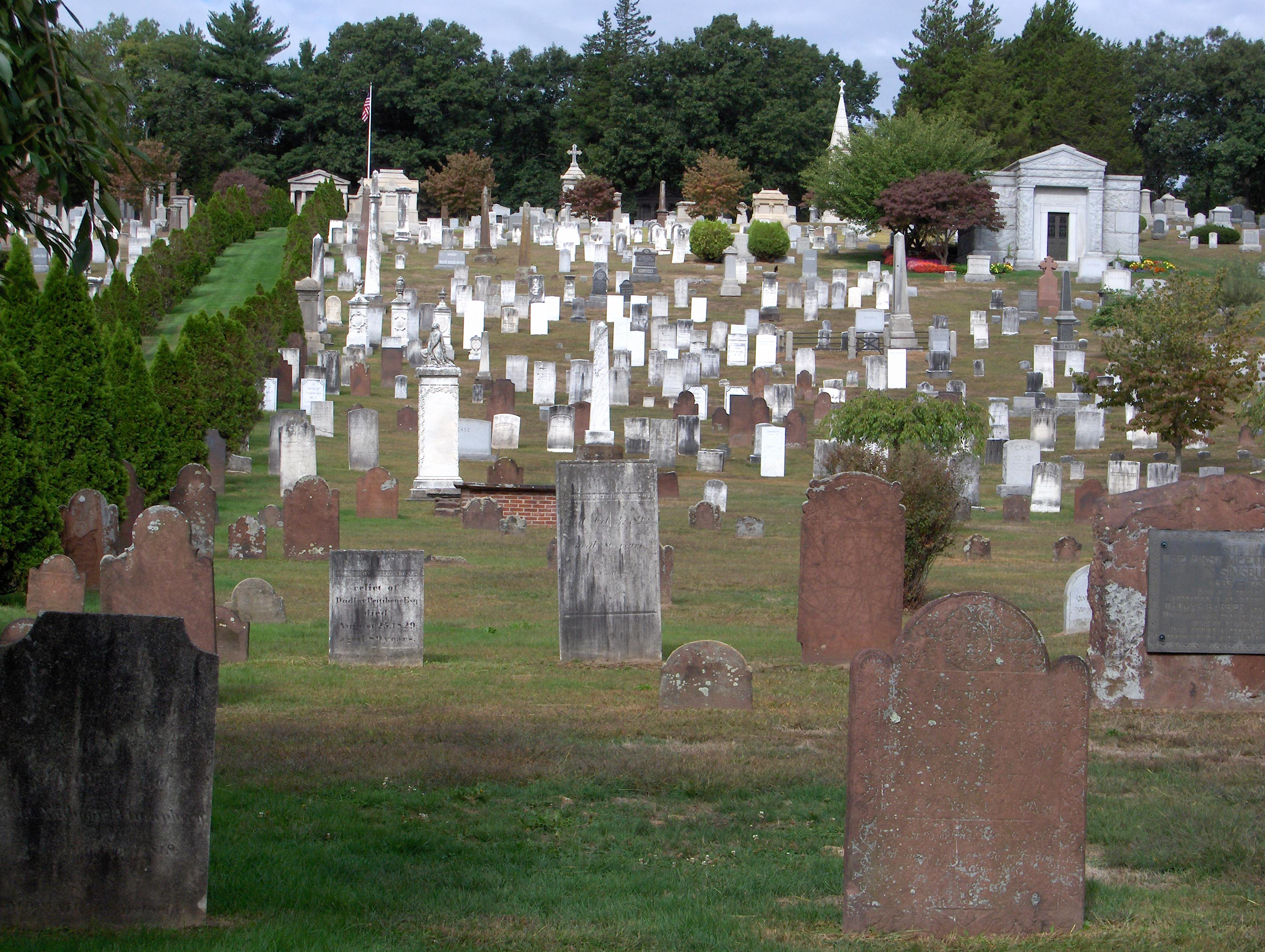
Simsbury Cemetery

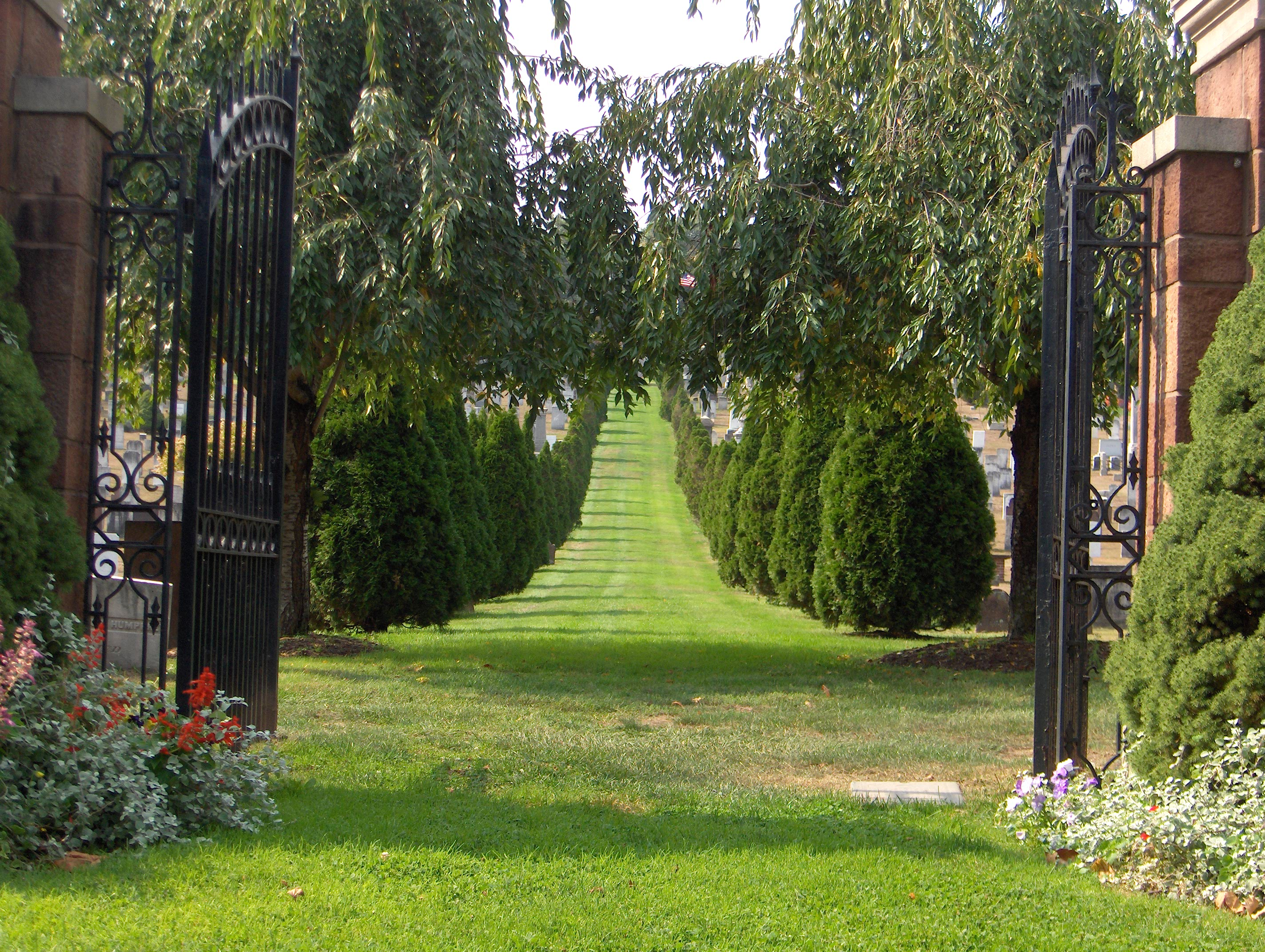
Simsbury Cemetery Main Entrance

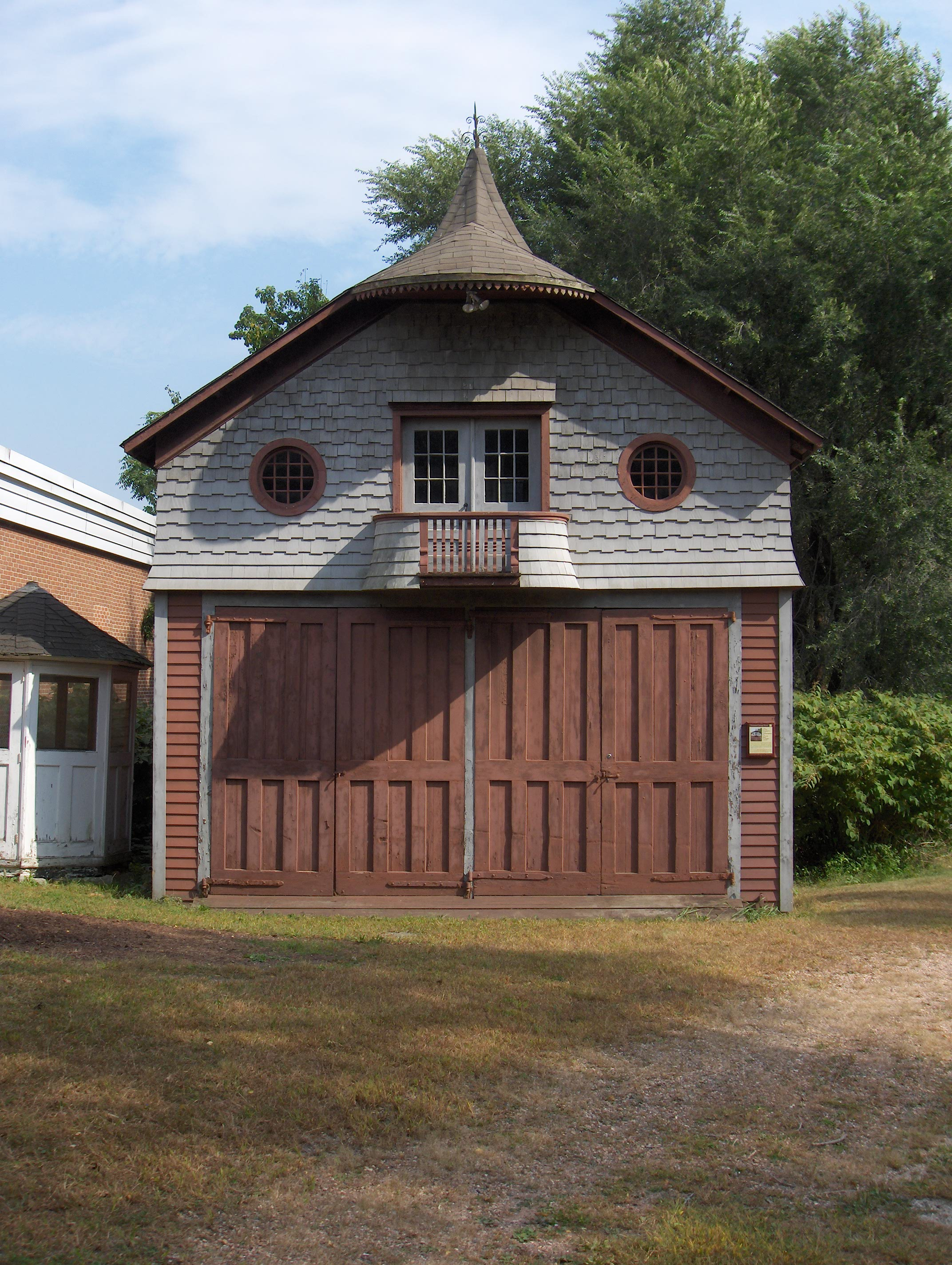
Carriage House

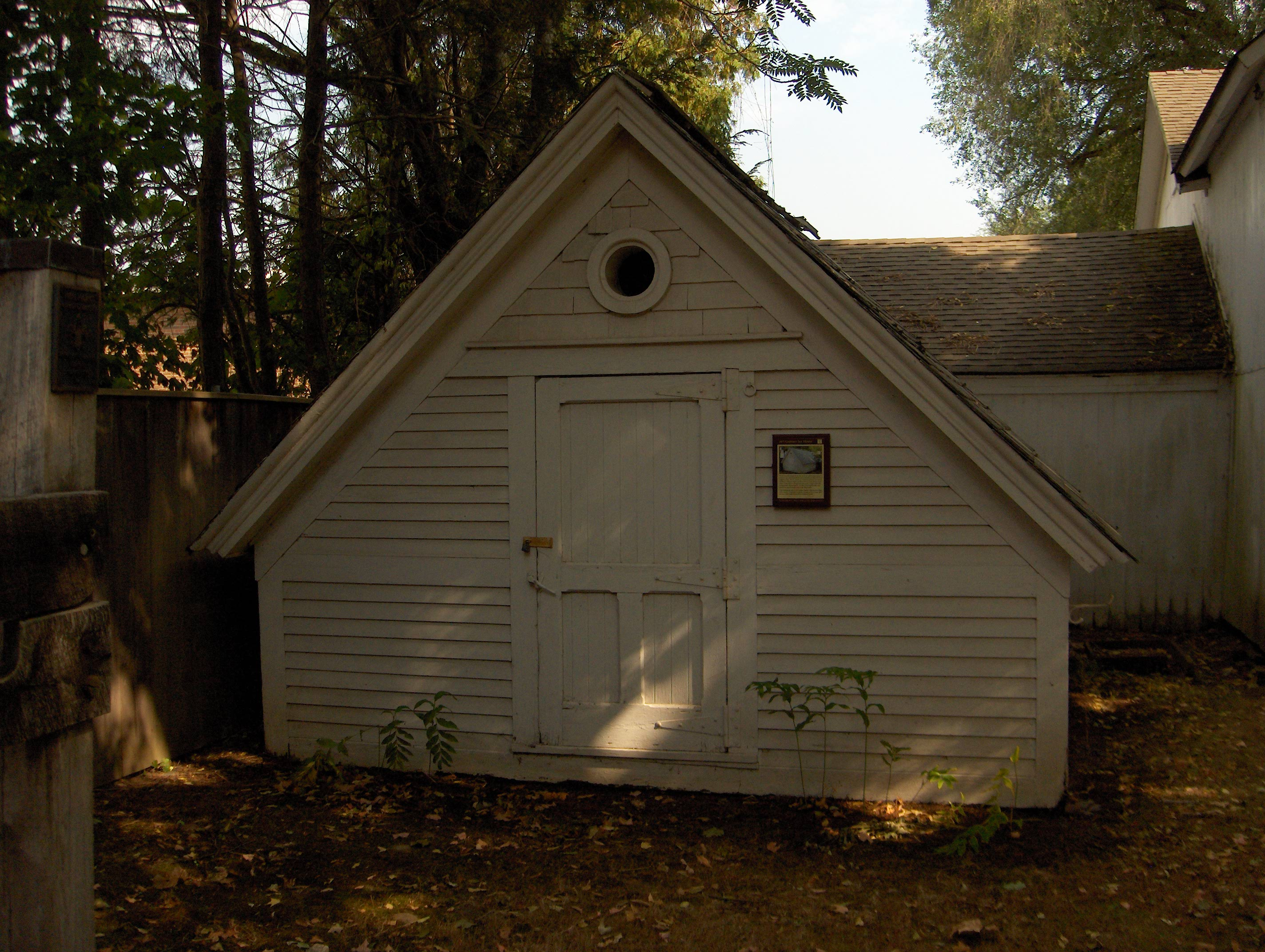
Ice House

== See also ==
- National Register of Historic Places listings in Hartford County, Connecticut
