= Simsbury station =

- Simsbury Railroad Depot
- U.S. National Register of Historic Places
- U.S. Historic district – Contributing property
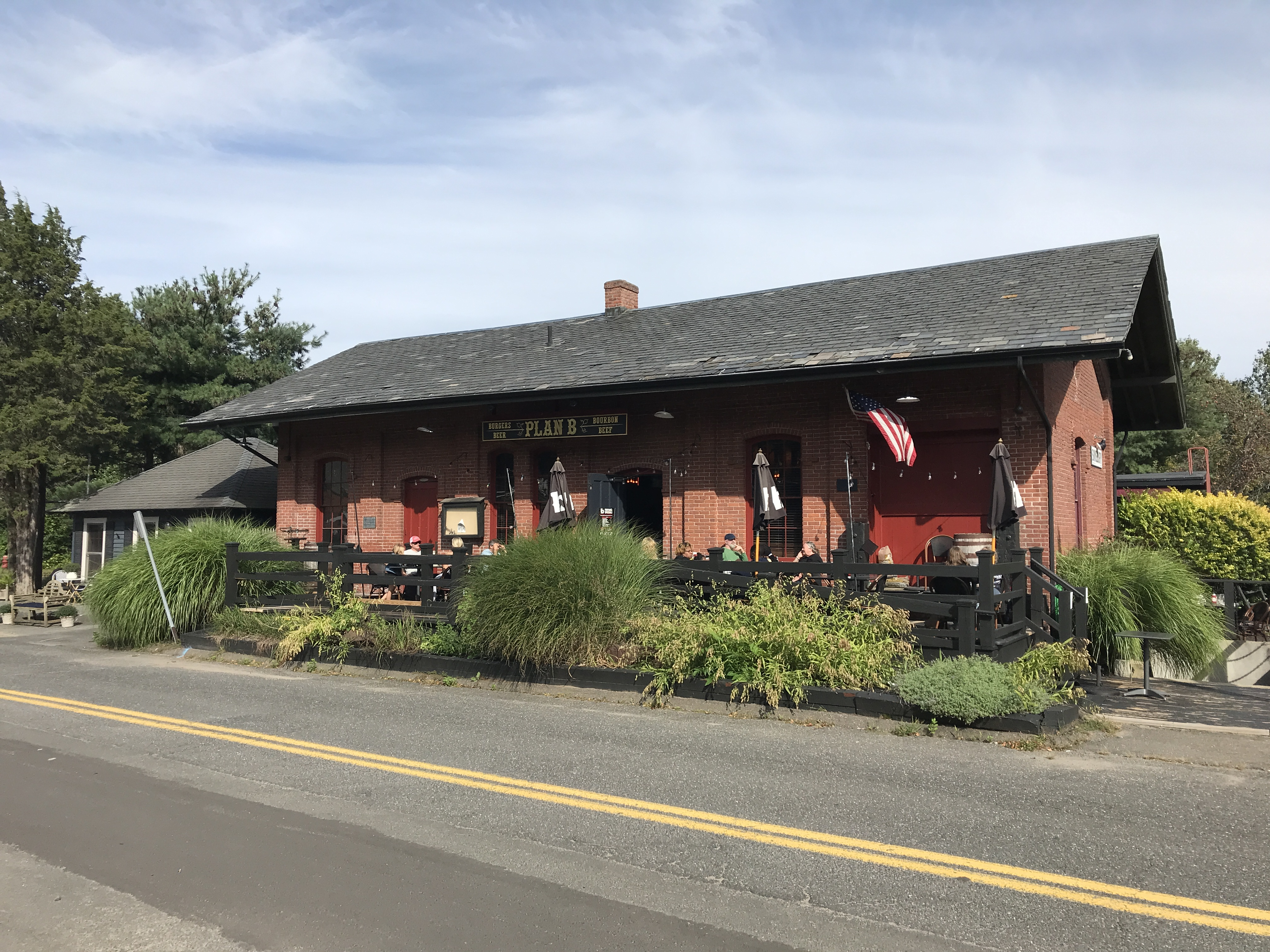
- The former Simsbury station building in 2023
- Interactive map of Simsbury Railroad Depot
- Location: Railroad Avenue at Station Street, Simsbury, Connecticut
- Coordinates: 41°52′27″N 72°48′2″W
- Built: 1875
- Architectural style: Italianate
- Part of: Simsbury Center Historic District (ID96000356)
- NRHP reference No.: 76001997

Significant dates
- Added to NRHP: March 26, 1976
- Designated CP: April 12, 1996

Simsbury station is a former railroad station in the center of Simsbury, Connecticut. Built in 1875, it is a distinctive example of a railroad station with Italianate styling. The building was listed on the National Register of Historic Places on March 26, 1976 as Simsbury Railroad Depot. Presently, it houses a restaurant, called "Plan B".

== Description and history ==
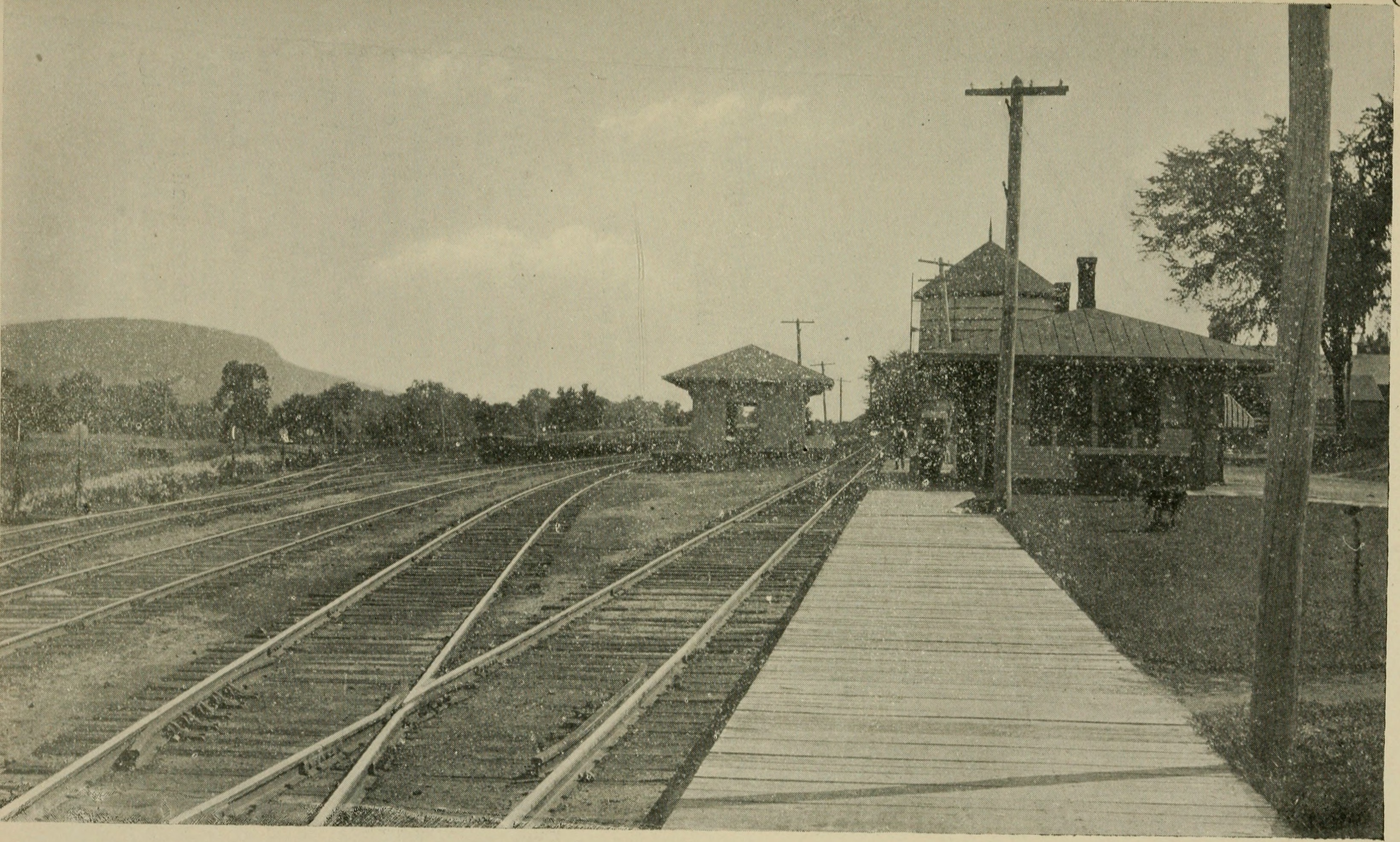
The CNE station at Simsbury around 1900

The former Simsbury Railroad Depot stands on the east side of Simsbury's downtown area, on the east side of Railroad Street between Station Street and Phelps Lane. It is a narrow rectangular single-story brick building, oriented north-south, with the road to the west and the former railroad right-of-way to the east. The street-facing facade is divided into six bays, each slightly recessed with a band of brick corbelling at the top, and brick pilasters between. As built, there were three window bays, two pedestrian entrances, and a freight door in these bays; they have since been altered for use by the restaurant.

Simsbury was first served by the Farmington Canal in 1826. The canal failed in 1846, and its route was overbuilt by the New Haven and Northampton Railroad in 1850. This line provided service between New Haven and points further north on the Connecticut River. A second line was run through the town in 1871, connecting Hartford with Albany, New York. A station is documented as standing on this site in 1873, but the records of the Connecticut Western Railway indicate the present building was constructed in 1875. The styling is particularly unusual for the period, as most stations built at the time were wood frame structures that had more Gothic Revival elements.

== See also ==
- National Register of Historic Places listings in Hartford County, Connecticut
