= Smith & Bassette =

Practice information
- Founders: H. Hillard Smith; Roy D. Bassette
- Founded: 1911
- Dissolved: 1946
- Location: Hartford, Connecticut

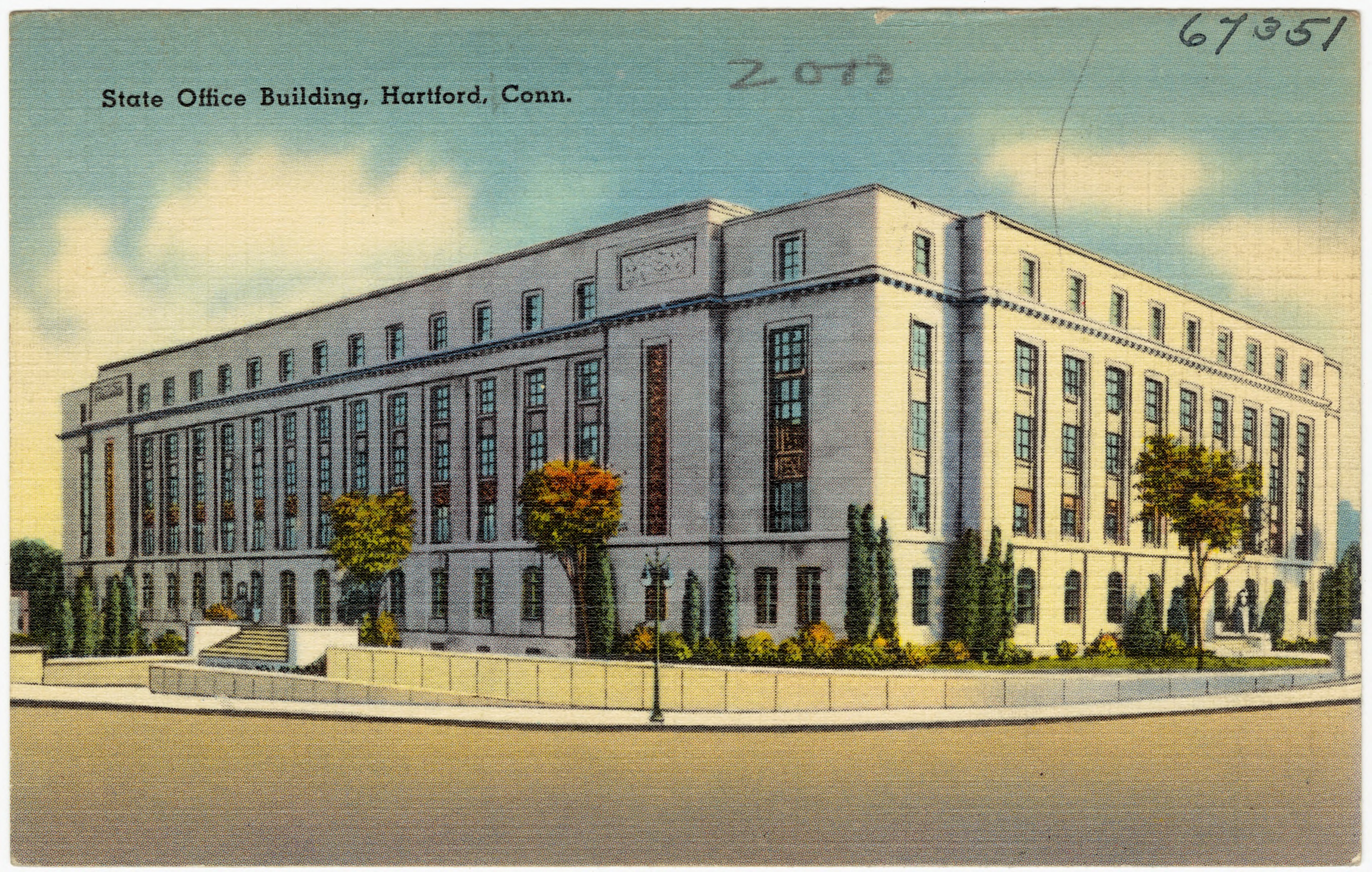
Connecticut State Office Building, Hartford, Connecticut, 1930–31.

Smith & Bassette was an architectural firm based in Hartford, Connecticut. Its partners included H. Hilliard Smith and Roy D. Bassette. It was active from 1911 to 1946.

== Biographies of founders ==
=== H. Hilliard Smith ===
Harry Hilliard Smith was born November 16, 1871, in Middletown, Connecticut, to Henry Hosea and Phillippa G. (Hilliard) Smith. He attended the public schools of Middletown and the Massachusetts Institute of Technology in Boston. After his graduation he returned to Connecticut and entered the office of William C. Brocklesby, a Hartford architect, and formed a partnership with him in 1904. Brocklesby & Smith was active until Brocklesby's death in late 1910. Early the following year, he established his partnership with Roy D. Bassette. He retired from active practice in 1942.

Smith was also a painter and exhibited in Connecticut and New York. He was married in 1902, to Mrs. Grace (Flint) Lephart of Danbury, Connecticut. He died May 24, 1948, in Hartford.

=== Roy D. Bassette ===
Roy Donald Bassette was born January 10, 1883, in New Britain, Connecticut, to Frederick Henry and Margaret (Anderson) Bassette. He attended the New Britain public schools, graduating from the high school in 1901. He then went to Springfield, Massachusetts, where he worked for the F. A. Bassette Company, and publishing company founded and owned by his older brother, Frederick A. Bassette. He then attended the University of Pennsylvania, studying under Paul Philippe Cret, and graduated in 1908. From 1908 to 1910 he taught architecture in the university. Early in 1910 he returned to Springfield, where he established an architectural practice. Early the following year, he established his partnership with H. Hilliard Smith. After Smith's retirement in 1942, Bassette continued to practice under the name of Smith & Bassette. After 1946 he practiced under his own name until his own retirement in 1954.

Bassette was married in 1914 to Elizabeth Fidelia Hubbard of West Hartford, Connecticut. He died May 18, 1965, in Hartford.

== Legacy ==
It has been said of Smith & Bassette that "[they] became known for [their] design of multi-purpose public buildings and their skill in the Classical and Colonial Revival genres. For example, in 1917 (Note: Correct date is 1927.) the firm shared first place with Paul P. Cret for the design of a Classical Revival building in the Hartford County Building Competition." The Hartford historian David F. Ransom has indicated that Smith & Bassette was probably the most prestigious architectural practice in Hartford in the period between the two World Wars.

At least three of the firm's projects have been individually listed on the United States National Register of Historic Places:

== Architectural works ==
- Heublein Tower, Talcott Mountain State Park, Simsbury, Connecticut (1914–15, NRHP-listed 1983)
- Simsbury Bank and Trust Company Building, Simsbury, Connecticut (1917, NRHP-listed 1986)
- Longmeadow Community House, Longmeadow, Massachusetts (1921–22)
- Steiger Building, Hartford, Connecticut (1926–28)
- Hartford County Building, (Note: Designed in association with Paul Philippe Cret of Philadelphia.) Hartford, Connecticut (1927-1929)
- Connecticut State Office Building, Hartford, Connecticut (1930–31)
- Eno Memorial Hall, Simsbury, Connecticut (1931–32, NRHP-listed 1993)
- Storrs Library, Longmeadow, Massachusetts (1932–33)
- William Stanton Andrews Memorial Town Hall, Clinton, Connecticut (1936–38)
- Lucy Robbins Welles Library (former), Newington, Connecticut (1939)
- Wickham Memorial Library, East Hartford, Connecticut (1939-1940)

== Gallery of architectural works ==
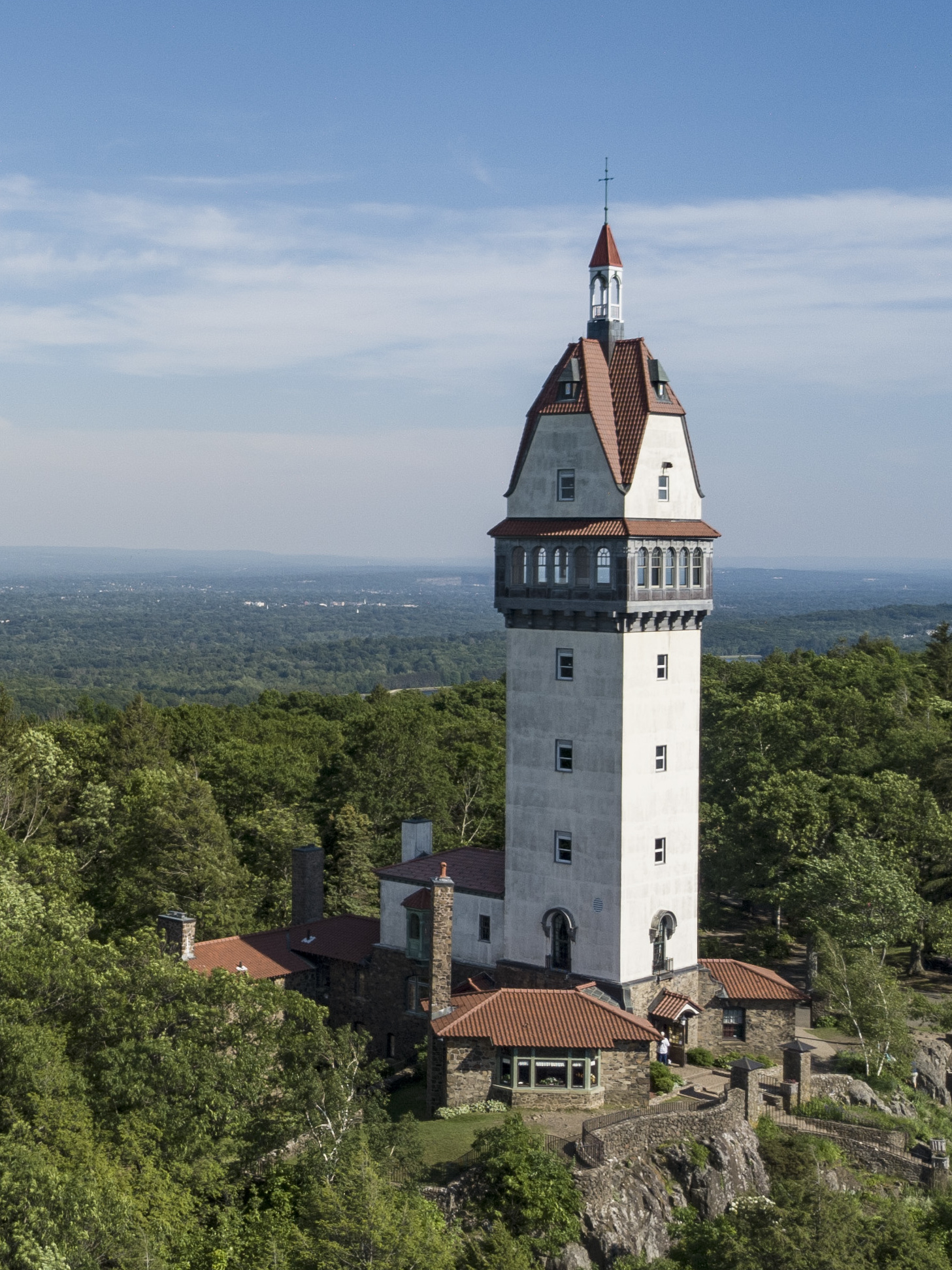
Heublein Tower, Talcott Mountain State Park, Simsbury, CT, 1914–15

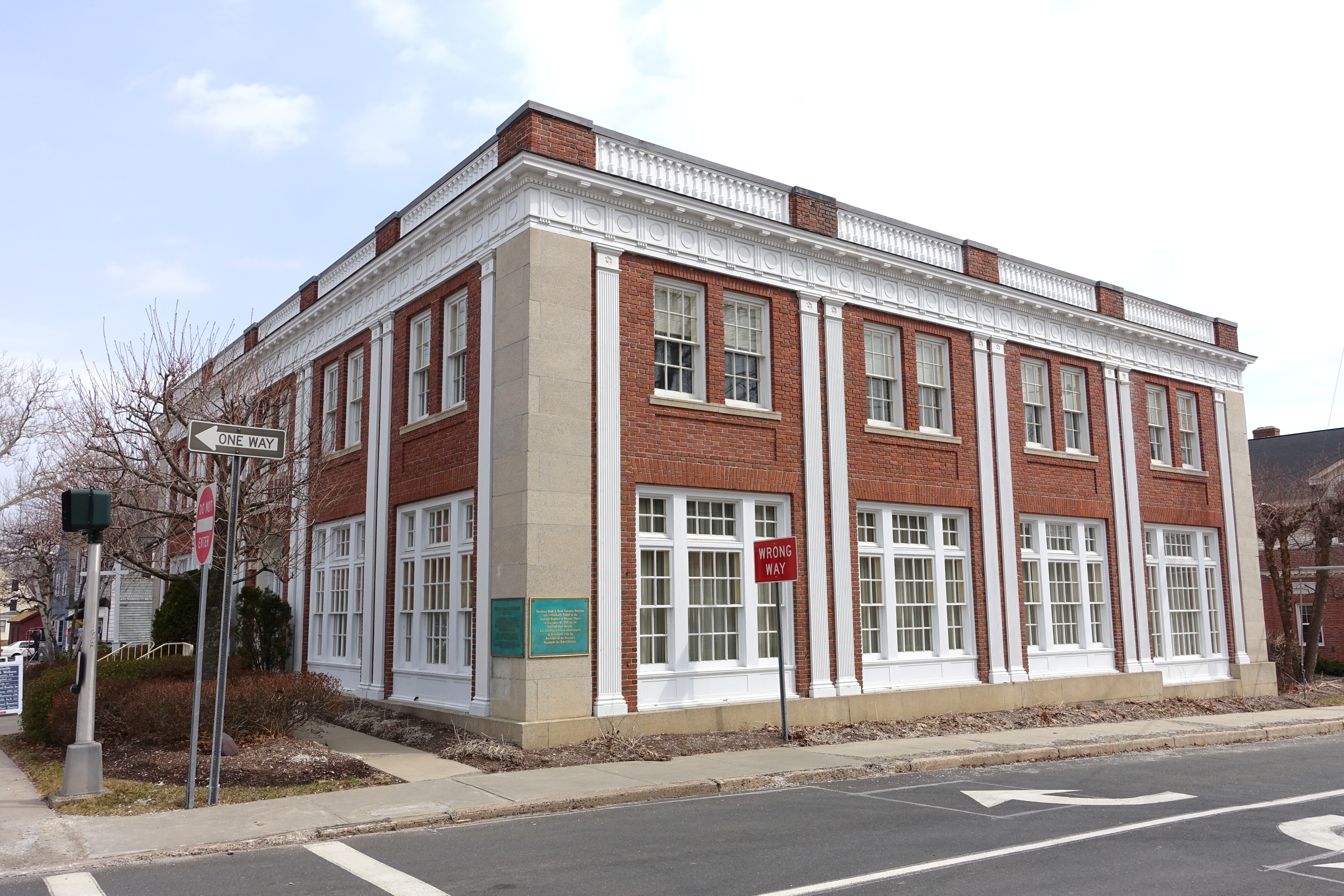
Simsbury Bank and Trust Company Building, Simsbury, CT, 1917

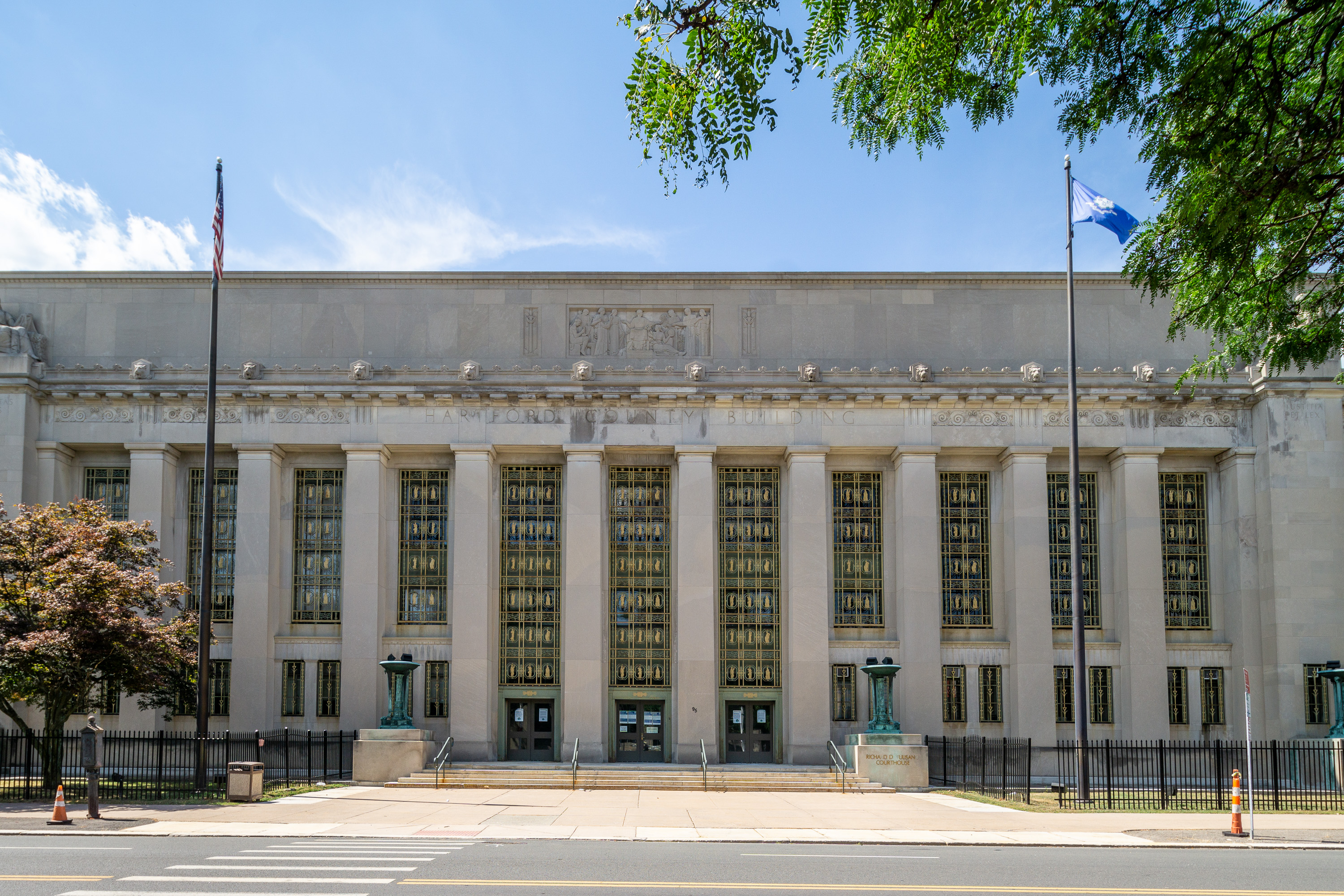
Hartford County Building, Hartford, CT, 1927–29

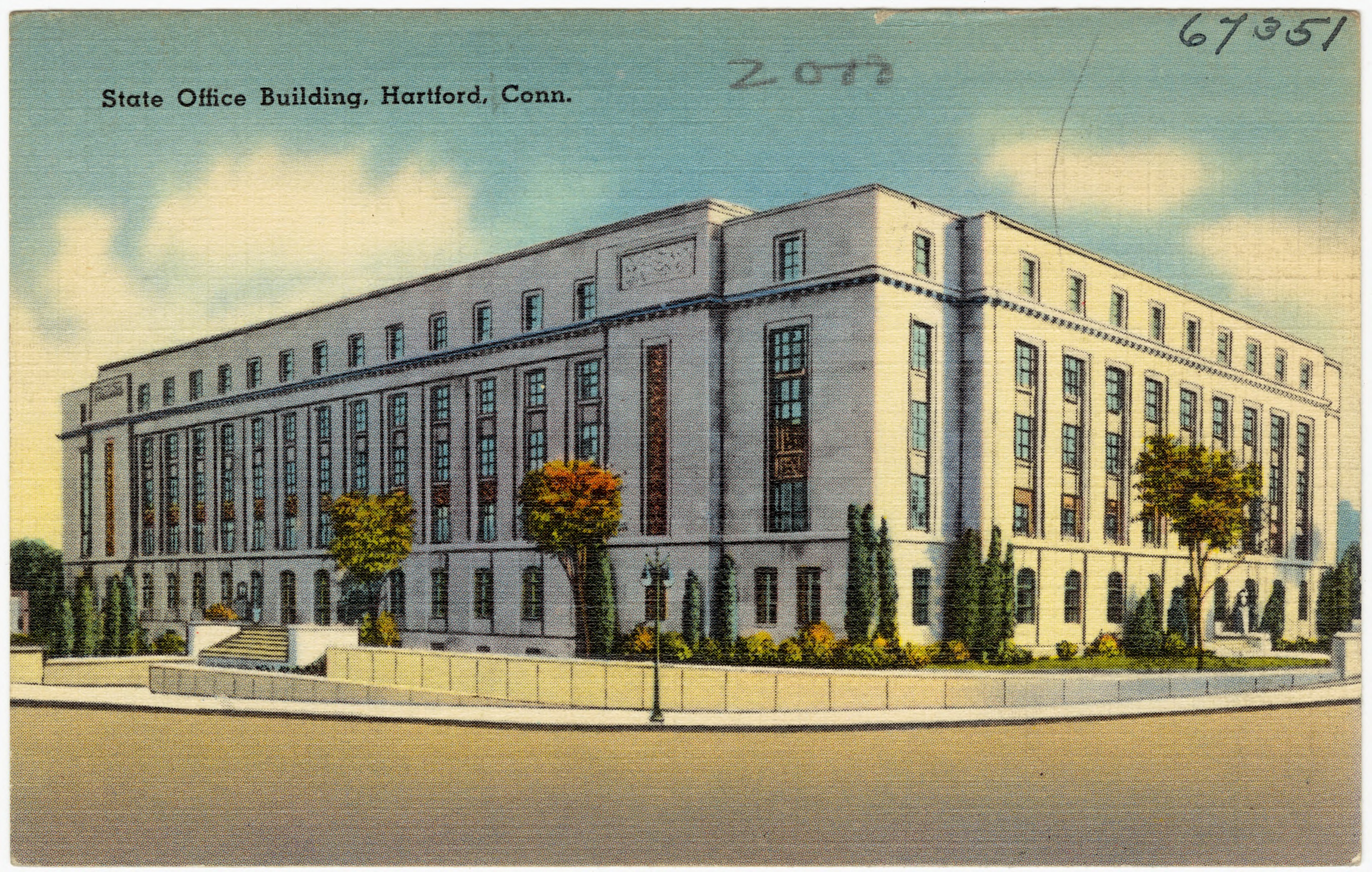
Connecticut State Office Building, Hartford, CT, 1930–31

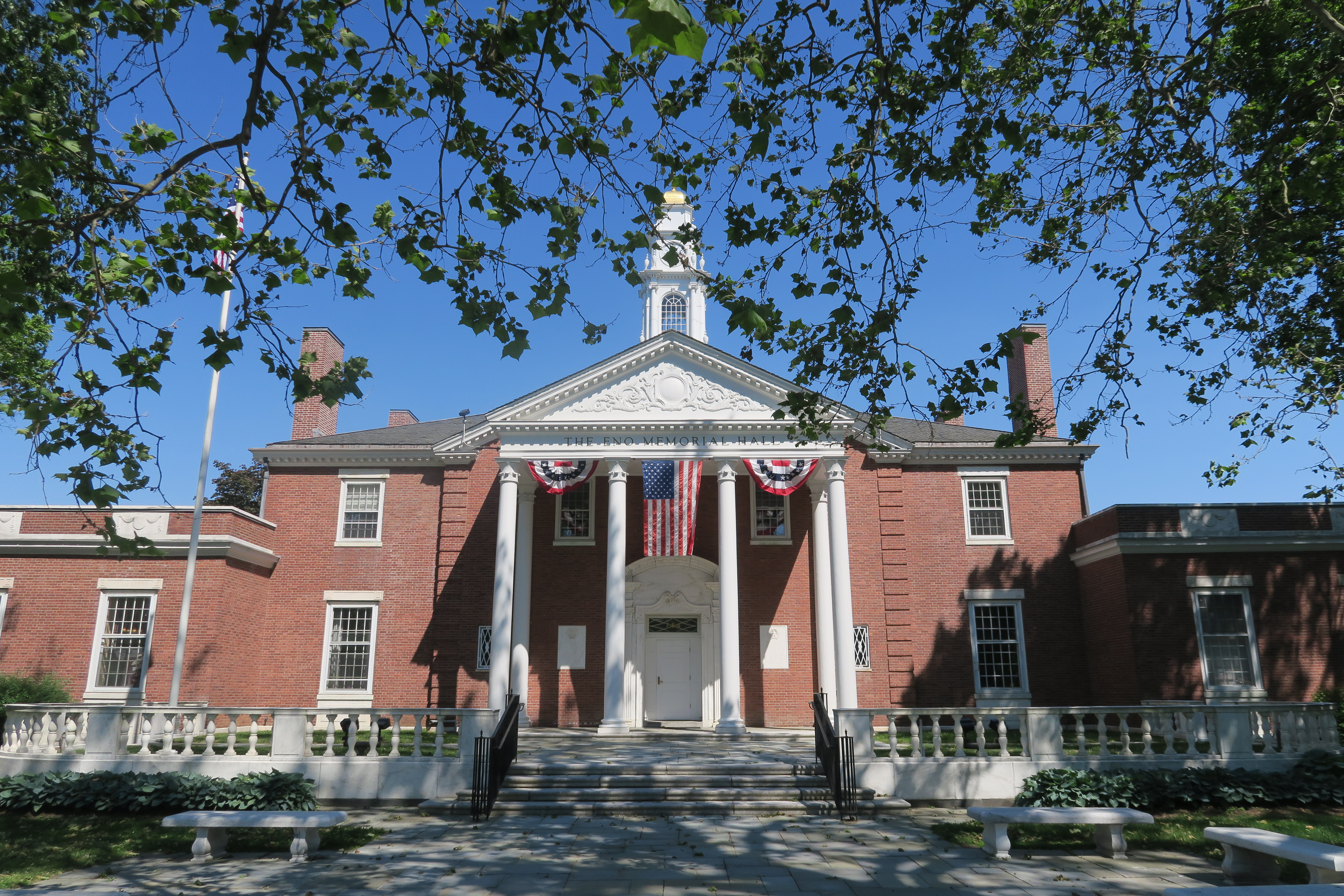
Eno Memorial Hall, Simsbury, CT, 1931–32
