= National Register Information System =

Database of United States historic places

The National Register Information System (NRIS) is a database of properties that have been listed on the United States National Register of Historic Places. The database includes more than 84,000 entries of historic sites that are currently listed on the National Register, that were previously listed and later removed, or that are pending listing. The database includes approximately 45 pieces of data for each listed property. The accuracy of the NRIS database may be imperfect. For example, a 2004 paper addressed the accuracy of spatial location data for part of the NRIS content.

== History ==
Efforts to digitize the database began as early as 1968, but the database was not fully digitized until 1986. By 1994 it had come to be used in answering more than 4,000 public queries per year.

== Availability ==
A search interface within the National Park Service's NPS Focus system provides access to a skeletal record of NRIS data, as well as to photographs and documents describing properties listed on the National Register. The skeletal record includes a simplified set of information in NRIS about all sites listed through August 2012. The NPS Focus search screen allows searching by NRHP listing name or other property identifiers.
