= Palmetto Court =

Historic house in California, United States

- U.S. National Register of Historic Places
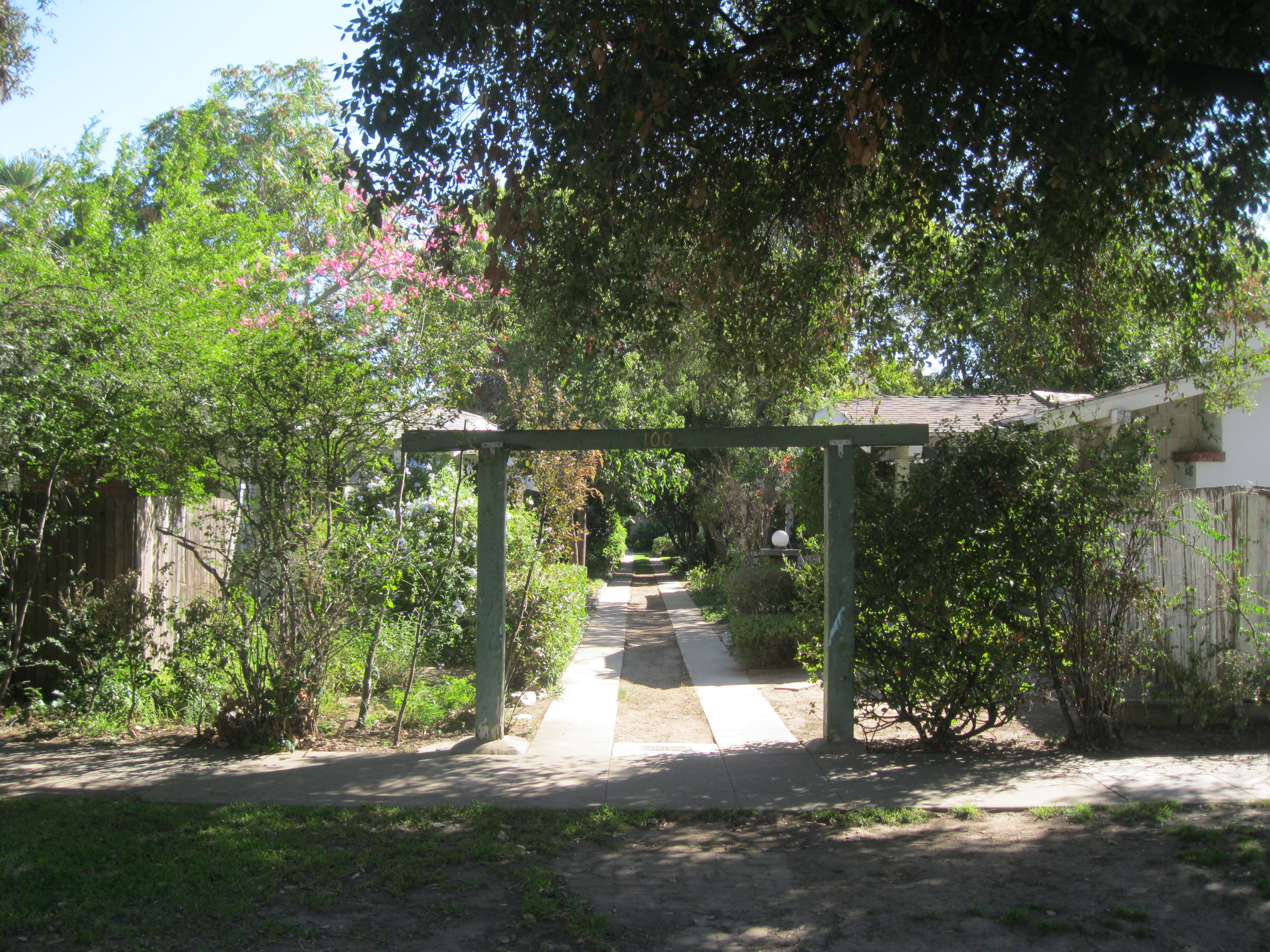
- The entrance to the court

- Location within the Los Angeles metropolitan area Location within California Location within the United States
- Location: 100 Palmetto Dr., Pasadena, California
- Coordinates: 34°8′14″N 118°9′9″W
- Area: 0.5 acres (0.20 ha)
- Built: 1915
- Built by: Parlee, A. C.
- Architectural style: American Craftsman
- MPS: Bungalow Courts of Pasadena TR
- NRHP reference No.: 83001201
- Added to NRHP: July 11, 1983

Palmetto Court is a bungalow court located at 100 Palmetto Dr. in Pasadena, California. The court consists of twelve single-family homes arranged along two central pathways with a two-unit building at the end of the paths. A torii-like gate is located at the court's street entrance. Contractor A. C. Parlee built the court in 1915. The homes in the court are designed in the American Craftsman style and feature both shingle and clapboard siding and a variety of roof styles including jerkinhead, gable, and shed.

The court was added to the National Register of Historic Places on July 11, 1983.

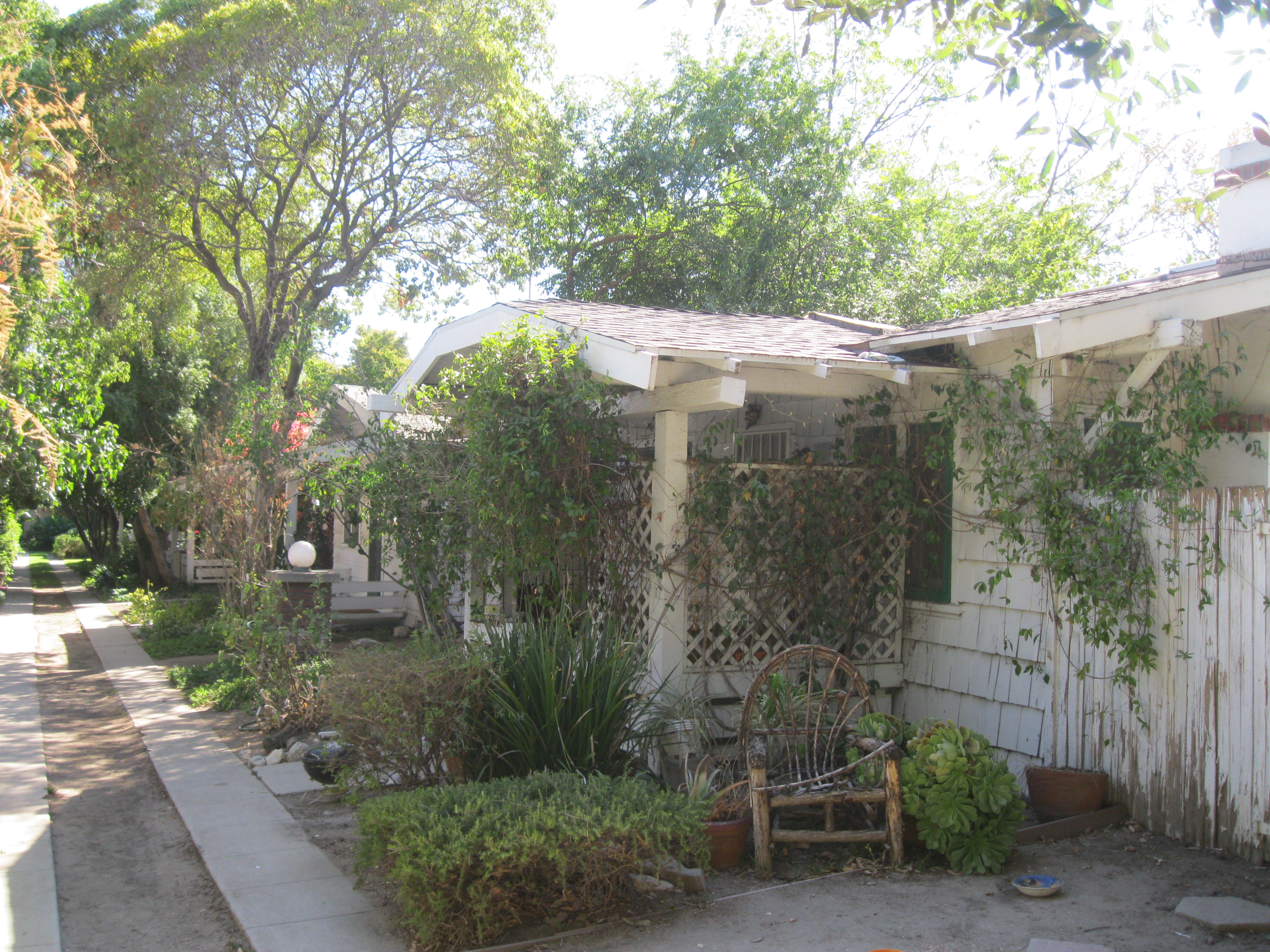
Houses in the court
