= Eno Memorial Hall =

- U.S. National Register of Historic Places
- U.S. Historic district – Contributing property
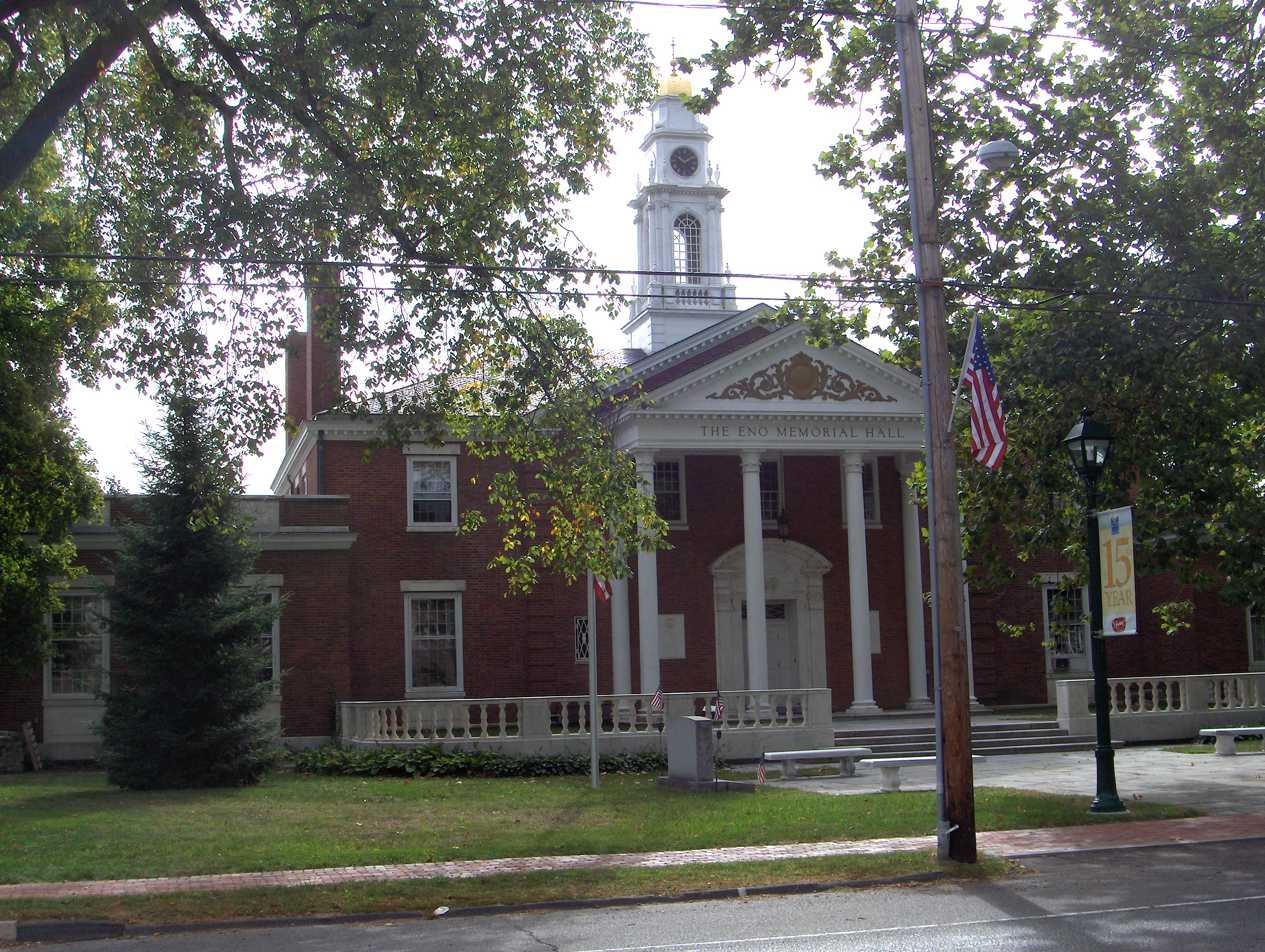

- Location within Connecticut Location within the United States
- Location: 754 Hopmeadow Street, Simsbury, Connecticut
- Coordinates: 41°52′28″N 72°48′6″W
- Area: 1 acre (0.40 ha)
- Built: 1932
- Architect: Bassette, Roy D.
- Architectural style: Colonial Revival, Classical Revival
- Part of: Simsbury Center Historic District (ID96000356)
- NRHP reference No.: 93000210

Significant dates
- Added to NRHP: April 2, 1993
- Designated CP: April 12, 1996

Eno Memorial Hall is a historic civic building at 754 Hopmeadow Street in Simsbury, Connecticut. Built in 1932, it served historically as a courthouse, as a city hall, as an auditorium, and as government offices. It was designed by Roy D. Bassette, and was given to the town by Antoinette Eno Wood, who was descended from some of the town's early settlers. It presently serves as the town's senior center. The hall was listed on the National Register of Historic Places in 1993.

== Description and history ==
Eno Memorial Hall stands in the center of Simsbury, on the east side of Hopmeadow Street between Station Street and Wilcox Street. The building is a Classical Revival brick and stone structure, two stories in height, with a hip roof. A tetrastyle two-story Greek Revival temple front projects from the center of the building, and it is topped by a three-stage clock tower with gilded dome. The building houses an auditorium seating about 600, as well as smaller rooms in the flanking wings.

The hall was a gift to the town by Antoinette Eno Wood, a descendant of one of the town's early settlers. Her father, Amos Eno, was a Simsbury native and a major real estate developer in New York City. It was completed in 1932, and originally housed the town offices and its storage vault, in addition to the meeting and performance space. The town offices were moved out in 1969, and town meetings were moved to the Belden School auditorium in 1983. The building is now managed as part of the town's senior center.

== See also ==
- National Register of Historic Places listings in Hartford County, Connecticut
