= Massacoe State Forest =

State forest in Connecticut, United States

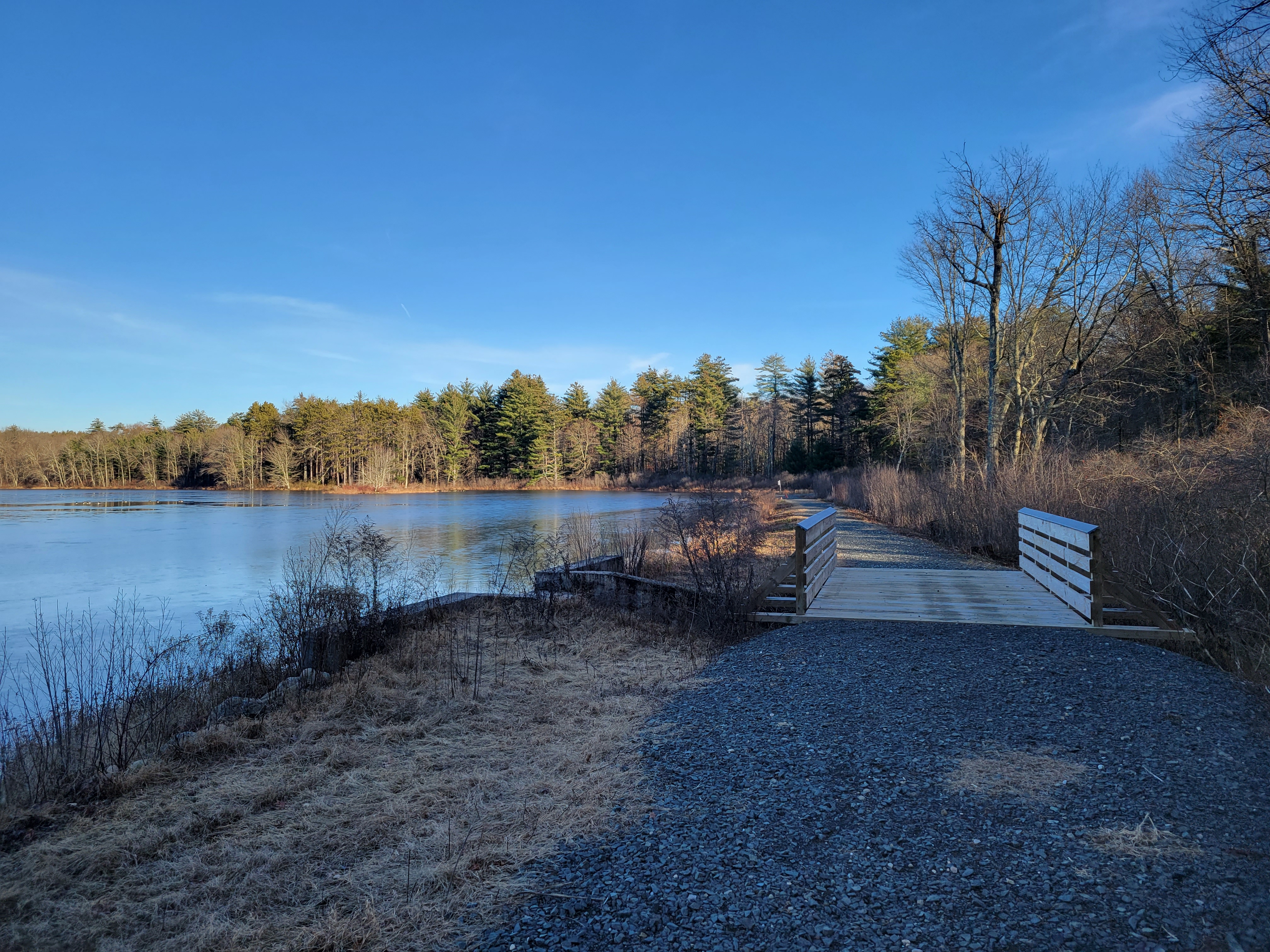
- Great Pond

- Location within Connecticut Location within the United States
- Location: Simsbury, Connecticut, United States
- Coordinates: 41°51′20″N 72°51′48″W
- Area: 370 acres (150 ha)
- Elevation: 348 ft (106 m)
- Established: 1908
- Administrator: Connecticut Department of Energy and Environmental Protection
- Website: Official website

Massacoe State Forest is a Connecticut state forest located in the town of Simsbury. The forest comprises two noncontiguous sections: the Great Pond Block, which encompasses 36-acre (15 ha) Great Pond, and the Massacoe Block, which lies next to Stratton Brook State Park. Forest recreational activities include hiking, fishing, and bird watching.
