= Robert and Julia Darling House =

Historic house in Connecticut, United States

- U.S. National Register of Historic Places
- U.S. Historic district – Contributing property
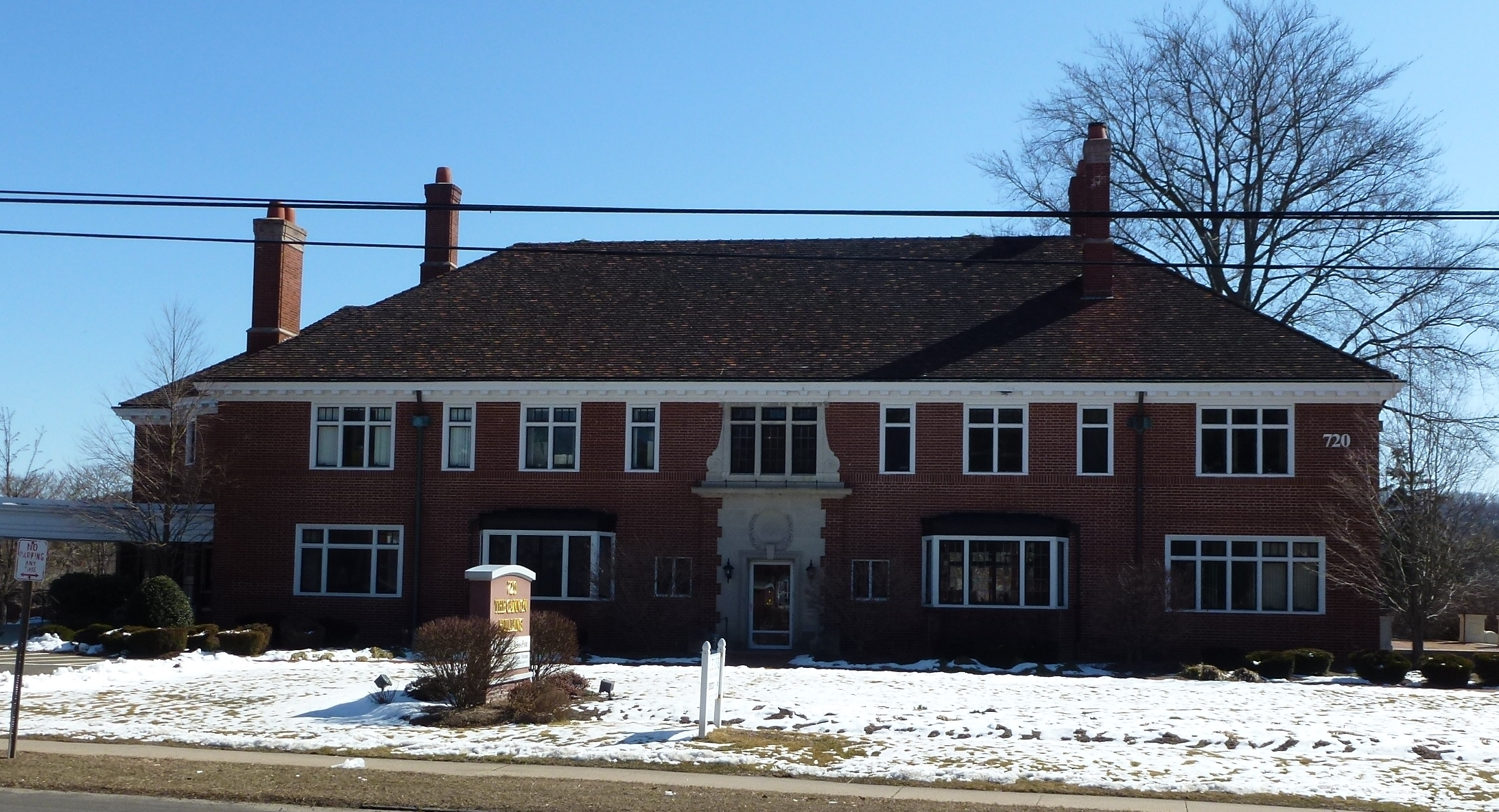

- Location within Connecticut Location within the United States
- Location: 720 Hopmeadow Street, Simsbury, Connecticut
- Coordinates: 41°52′20″N 72°48′10″W
- Area: 0.5 acres (0.20 ha)
- Built: 1927
- Architectural style: Colonial Revival
- Part of: Simsbury Center Historic District (ID96000356)
- NRHP reference No.: 90002117

Significant dates
- Added to NRHP: January 3, 1991
- Designated CP: April 12, 1996

The Robert and Julia Darling House, now the Cannon Building, is a historic house at 728 Hopmeadow Street in Simsbury, Connecticut. Built in 1927 for a local business leader, it is one of the town's largest and most distinctive examples of Colonial Revival architecture. The house was listed on the National Register of Historic Places in 1991. It now houses professional offices.

== Description and history ==
The Robert and Julia Darling House stands in the town center of Simsbury, on the east side of Hopmeadow Street, its principal thorough fare. It is just north of the Drake Hill shopping center, which stands on land formerly part of the Darling estate. It is a large two-story brick building, with a hip roof and a brownstone foundation. A two-story ell projects to the rear from its northeastern corner. The building exhibits basic symmetry in the Colonial Revival style, and has finely detailed entrances on the front-facing west, south, and in the corner created by the ell, which features a curved pavilion and porte-cochere. The interior, although it has been repurposed for office use, retains most of its original period woodwork.

The building was erected in 1927 for Robert Darling, the chairman of the locally headquartered Ensign-Bickford Company, and his wife Julia, a granddaughter of the company founder. Both of the Darlings were locally noted for their involvement in local civic and charitable affairs. The Darling estate originally consisted of about 35 acres (14 ha). After Robert Darling died in 1957, his son sold the house, and it was converted to medical offices. It now houses a variety of professional offices.

== See also ==
- National Register of Historic Places listings in Hartford County, Connecticut
