= Massacoe Forest Pavilion =

- U.S. National Register of Historic Places
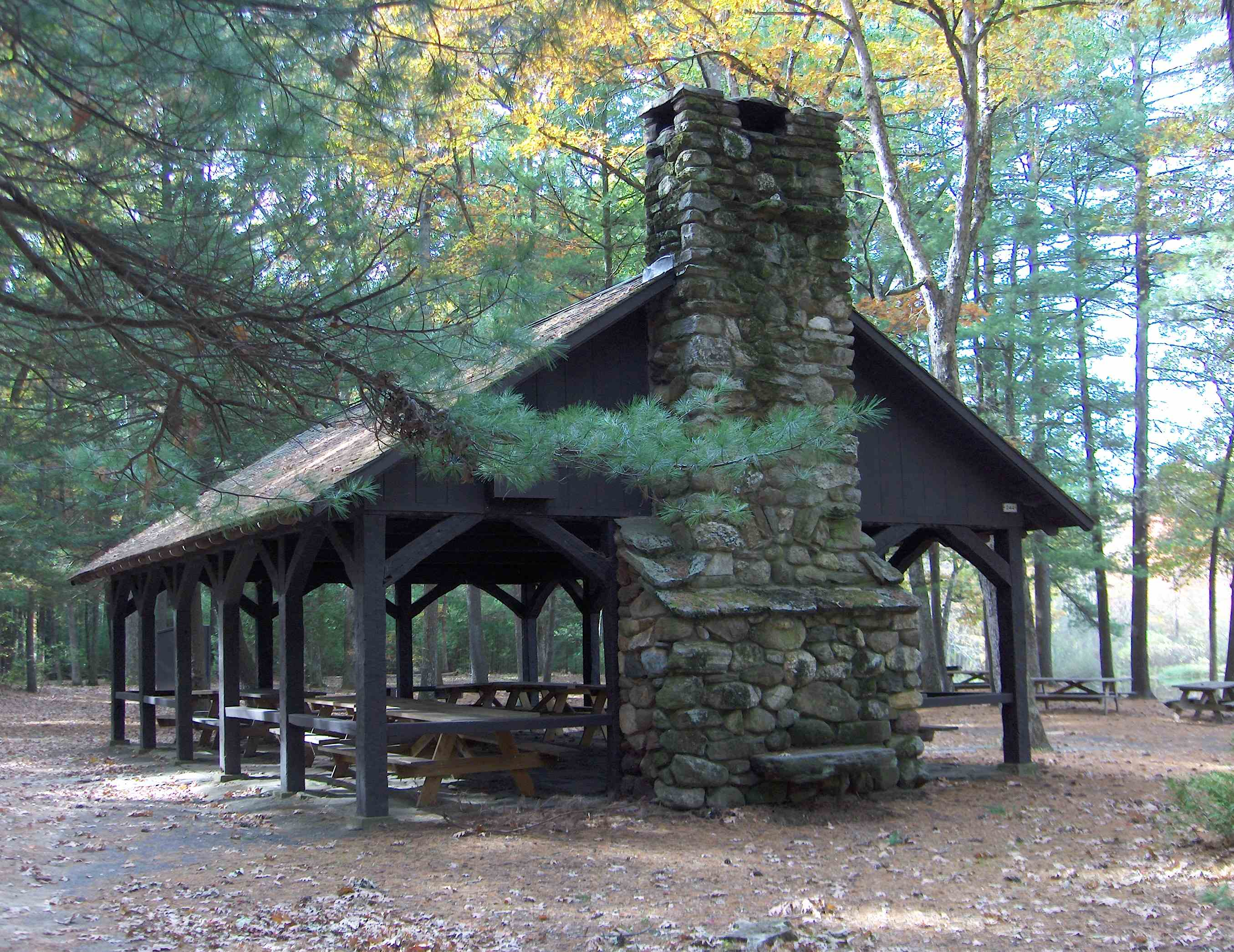

- Location within Connecticut Location within the United States
- Location: Stratton Brook State Park, Simsbury, Connecticut
- Coordinates: 41°51′49″N 72°50′10″W
- Area: 2.5 acres (1.0 ha)
- Built: 1935
- Built by: Civilian Conservation Corps; et al.
- Architectural style: Rustic
- MPS: Connecticut State Park and Forest Depression-Era Federal Work Relief Programs Structures TR
- NRHP reference No.: 86001731
- Added to NRHP: September 4, 1986

The Massacoe Forest Pavilion, also known as the Stratton Brook Park Pavilion, is a historic outdoor pavilion located in Stratton Brook State Park in Simsbury, Connecticut. It was built in 1935 by the Civilian Conservation Corps (CCC), and is a well-preserved example of the Corps' work. It was listed on the National Register of Historic Places in 1986.

== Description and history ==
Stratton Brook State Park is located in central Simsbury, on the south side of Farms Village Road (Connecticut Route 309). Its access drive leads to a parking area, with a beach and pond to its east and an open grassy area in between. At the southern end of the grassy area a paved path crosses a covered bridge leading to the picnic pavilion, which is set overlooking a second pond. The structure is built out of timber framing, and measures about 20 by 40 feet (6.1 m × 12.2 m). At one end is a large fieldstone chimney with sloping shoulders and a builtin bench. The structure is covered by a roof supported by heavy wooden trusses with rounded rafter ends. The floor of the shelter is flagstone.

The shelter was built in 1935 by the Civilian Conservation Corps (CCC) and is one of many CCC structures recognized in a Connecticut-wide thematic resources study. It was built beside Massacoe Pond, created by a dam built by the CCC in 1933. That dam was later replaced by the present concrete dam. At the time of their construction, the area was part of Massacoe State Forest, founded in 1908 with land donated by a local conservationist; Stratton Brook State Park was established in 1949.

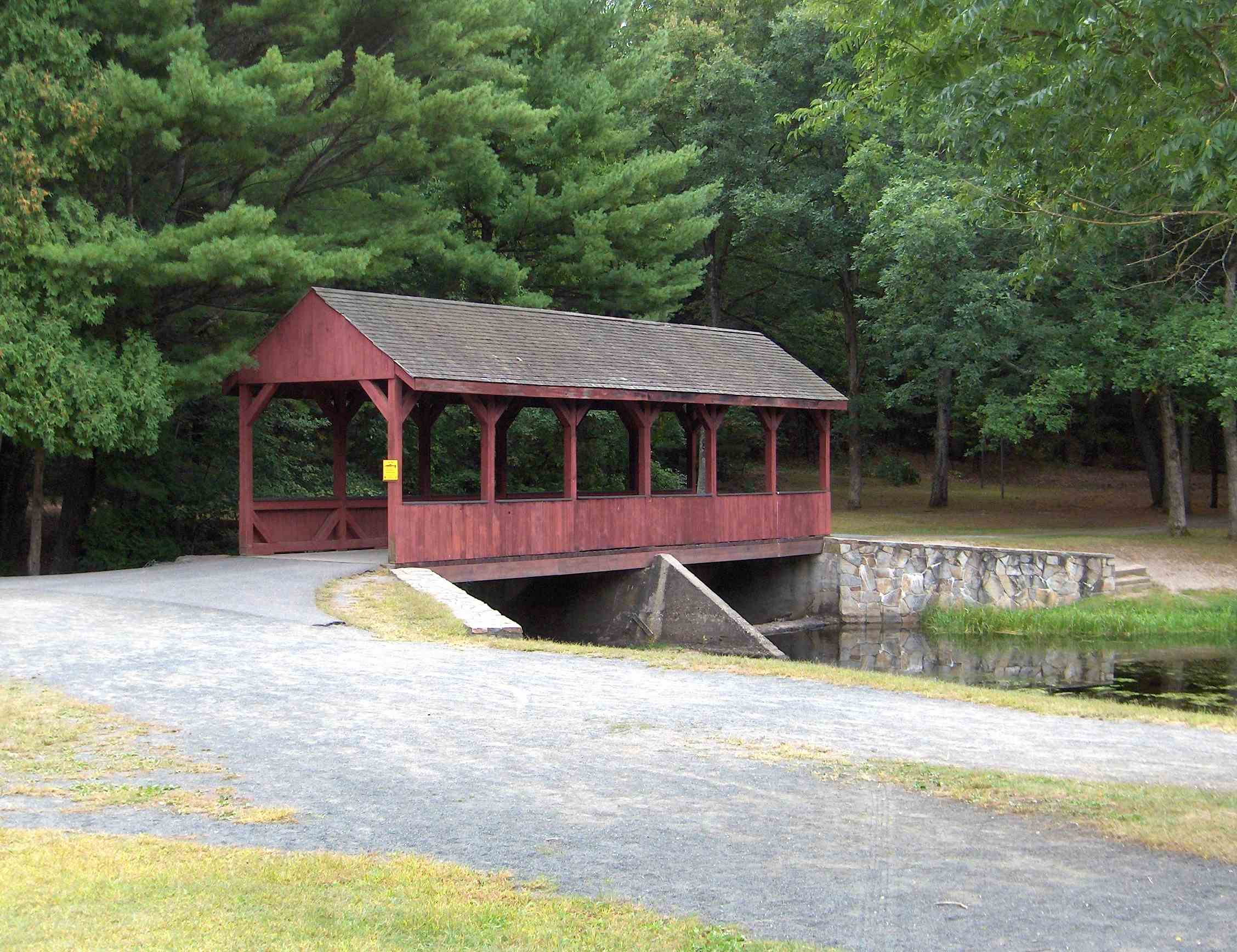
Covered footbridge at Stratton Brook State Park

== See also ==
- National Register of Historic Places listings in Hartford County, Connecticut
