= East Weatogue Historic District =

Historic district in Connecticut, United States

- U.S. National Register of Historic Places
- U.S. Historic district
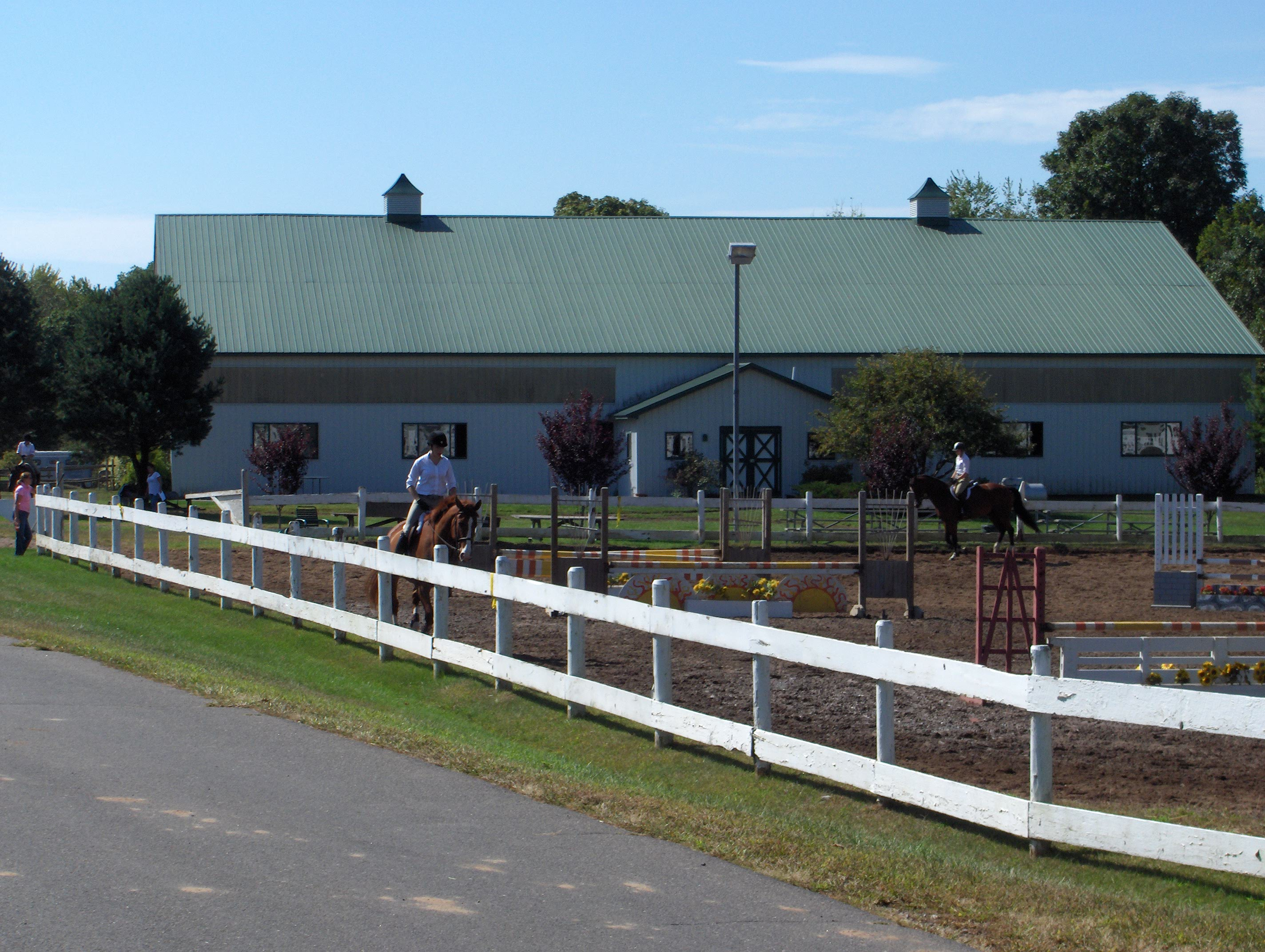
- Folly Farm in Simsbury

- Location within Connecticut Location within the United States
- Location: Roughly, properties on East Weatogue Street from just North of Riverside Drive to Hartford Road, and Folly Farm property to South, Simsbury, Connecticut
- Coordinates: 41°50′51″N 72°47′58″W
- Area: 490 acres (200 ha)
- Architectural style: Colonial Revival, Greek Revival, Federal
- NRHP reference No.: 90001107
- Added to NRHP: July 19, 1990

The East Weatogue Historic District is a 490-acre (200 ha) historic district in the town of Simsbury, Connecticut that was listed on the National Register of Historic Places in 1990. It then included 102 contributing buildings, 10 contributing sites, 11 contributing structures, and one other contributing object. The district encompasses a largely agrarian rural village centered at the junction of Hartford Road and East Weatogue Street, whose early development dates to the late 17th century, with the oldest surviving buildings dating to 1730. Most of the properties in the district are Colonial, Federal, or Greek Revival in character, with only a few later Victorian houses. In the early 20th century Colonial Revival houses sympathetic to the earlier buildings.

== Description and history ==
The town of Simsbury was settled in the 17th century and incorporated in 1670. None of its early buildings survived the ravages of King Philip's War in 1676, and it was not resettled until the early 18th century. East Weatogue, located in the plains between the Farmington River to the west and a low mountain ridge to the east, is one of three early village settlements from that period. Three houses from the first map of the area (dated about 1730) are still standing. The area has remained largely agricultural, and its land use is still reflective of early methods of use. At that time, farmers built houses in a village cluster, and typically worked land that was nearby; this resulted in the present arrangement of the village.

The historic district is roughly centered on the junction of East Weatogue Street and Hartford Road (Connecticut Route 185). Houses are set lining these two roads, having in a few instances grown into substantial farm complexes. Most of the principal buildings in the district are wood-frame houses, between one and 2 1/2 stories in height. The largest single architectural style is the colonial-era Georgian style, which continued to be built here into the 19th century. There are smaller numbers of Federal and Greek Revival houses, and later Victorian and 20th styles appear in only a few instances.

== See also ==
- National Register of Historic Places listings in Hartford County, Connecticut
