= Terry's Plain Historic District =

Historic district in Connecticut, United States

- U.S. National Register of Historic Places
- U.S. Historic district
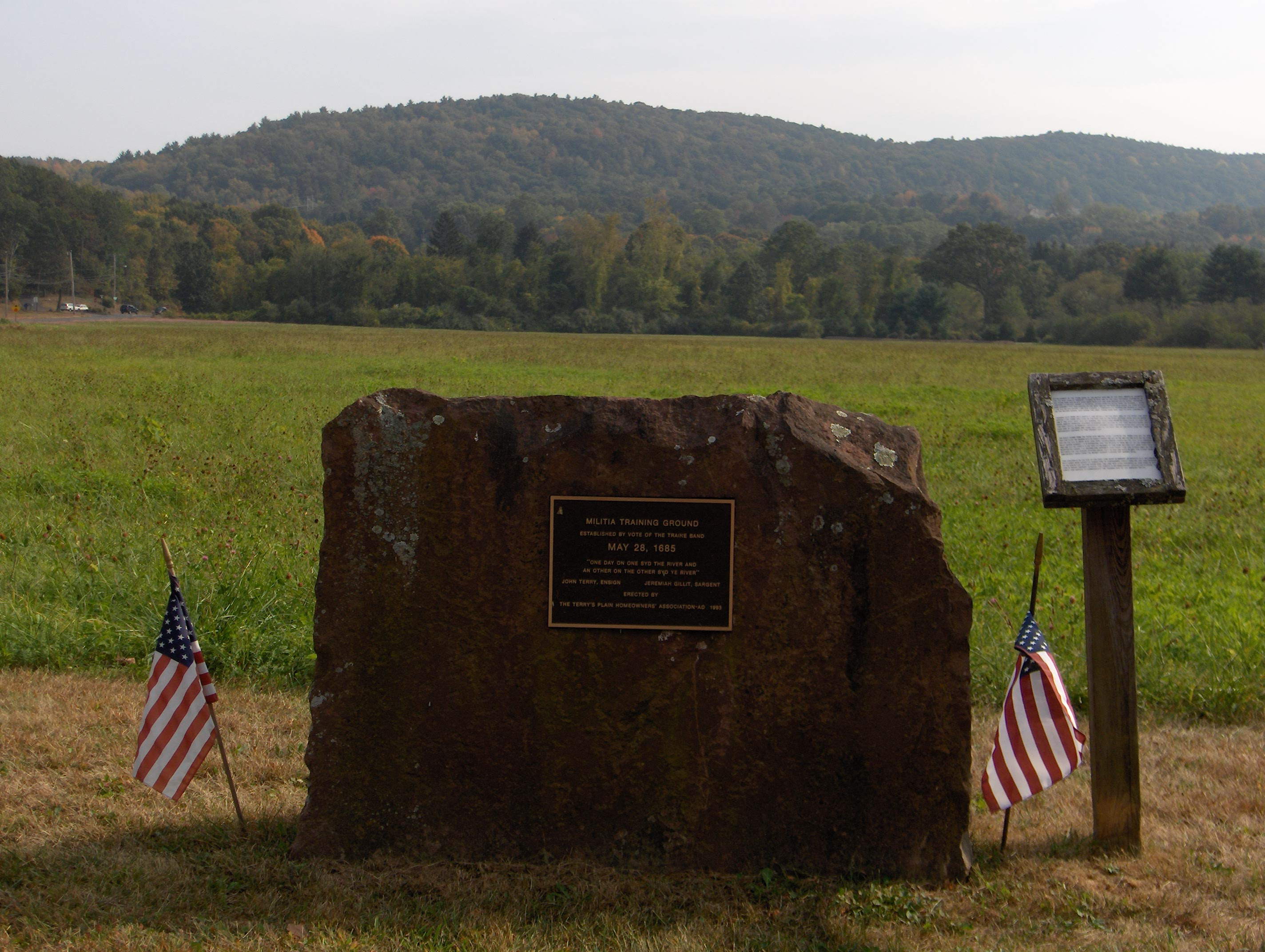
- Field used for militia training in the 17th century

- Location within Connecticut Location within the United States
- Location: Roughly bounded by Pharos, Quarry and Terry's Plain Roads and the Farmington River, Simsbury, Connecticut
- Coordinates: 41°53′1″N 72°47′5″W
- Area: 325 acres (132 ha)
- Built: c. 1660
- Architect: Multiple
- Architectural style: Late Victorian, Greek Revival, Federal
- NRHP reference No.: 93001417
- Added to NRHP: December 10, 1993

The Terry's Plain Historic District is a 325-acre (132 ha) historic district in the town of Simsbury, Connecticut that was listed on the National Register of Historic Places in 1993. The district is significant as a preserved rural landscape. It included 27 contributing buildings of various architectural styles, including Greek Revival, Federal and Late Victorian architecture, and 17 non-contributing buildings.

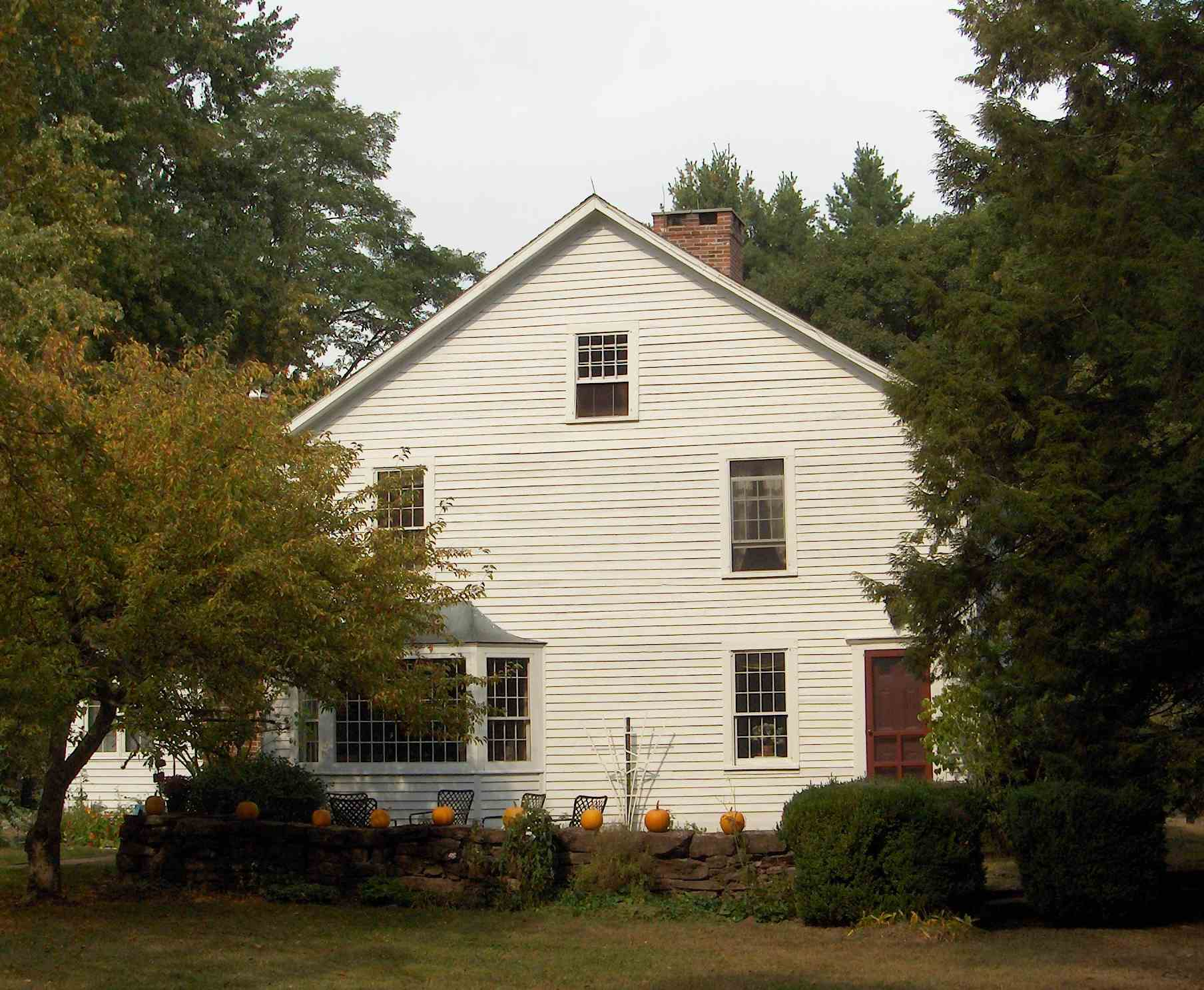
JOHN TERRY HOUSE, c. 1780

Thirteen houses that were parts of farm complexes and 14 agricultural outbuildings ranging from sheds to large tobacco barns.

Contributing sites include:

- A field where the militia drilled in 1683 (or 1685)
- 24 Ferry Lane, barn from c. 1840, house non-contributing (see #2 in photos accompanying NRHP nomination)
- Lucius D. Goodrich House, 36 Ferry Lane, c. 1836, Federal/Greek Revival
- 64 Terry's Plain Road, Late Victorian

== Traine Band (Militia) ==
Simsbury was founded as a town in 1670. Not long thereafter, the town established a militia, then known as a "traine band". The date of establishment of the militia is not known, but records of assemblies date to 1673. The Grand Committee of the Militia met in Hartford on August 11, 1673 to organize militia against a potential attack by the enemy. The Committee ordered the raising of 500 "dragoones" from the state, of which 160 were to come from Hartford County. At that meeting, Simon Wolcott and John Griffin of Simsbury were appointed to command the Simsbury Traine Band, which at that time numbered seven "dragoones".

The Committee included the following order:

It is ordered that each dragoone be prouided with a good sword and belt, and serviceable muskett or kirbine, with a shott powch and powder and bullitts, viz: one pownd of powder made into cartiridges fitt for his gunn, and three pownd of bulletts fitt for their gunns, or pistoll bulletts; and a horss to expedite their march.

— Grand Committee of the Militia,

Two years later, John Griffin was confirmed as sergeant of the Traine Band and placed in command.

== First home and first ferry ==
The first home in Simsbury was located in the Terry's Plain area. The land where the house would be built was granted in 1653 to Thomas Ford, although a house would not be built until approximately 1660, when Captain Aaron Cook, the son-in-law of Thomas Ford, built the first home in Simsbury.

In the same general area, a ferry was established to facilitate crossing of the Farmington River. The exact date of the origin of the Pent Street Ferry is not known, but a road to the ferry was commissioned in 1668.

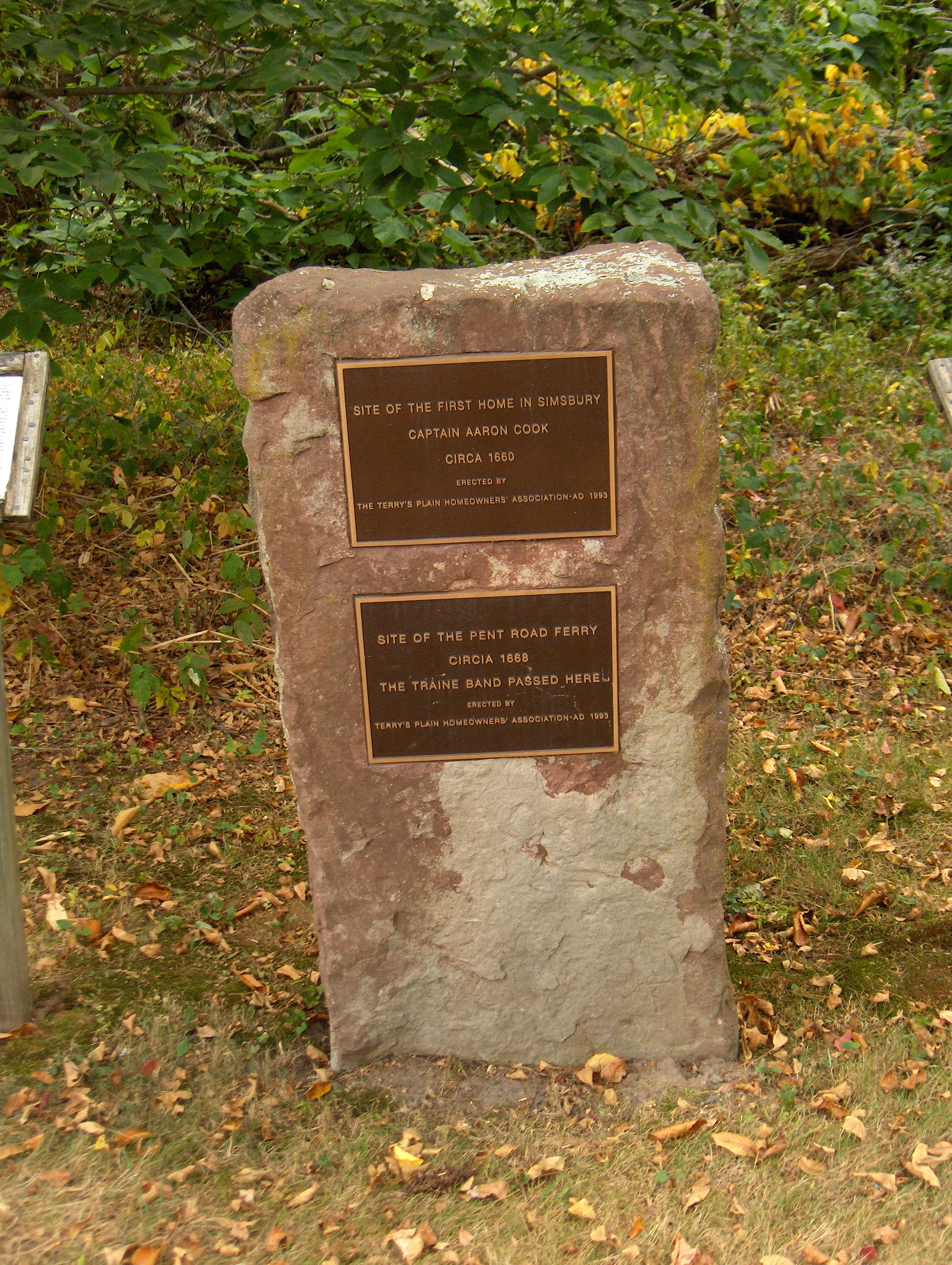
Plaque noting first home and ferry in Simsbury

== First school ==
The first school in Simsbury was located in Terry's Plain. The town agreed, at a town meeting on December 17, 1701, to "agree with and appoint a school master". The first day of school commenced on the first day of January 1702. The town discussed whether the school should be located on the east or west side of the river, and chose both, with the first three months to be held at a location in Terry's Plain, and then at a location in "Weatoug" on the west side.

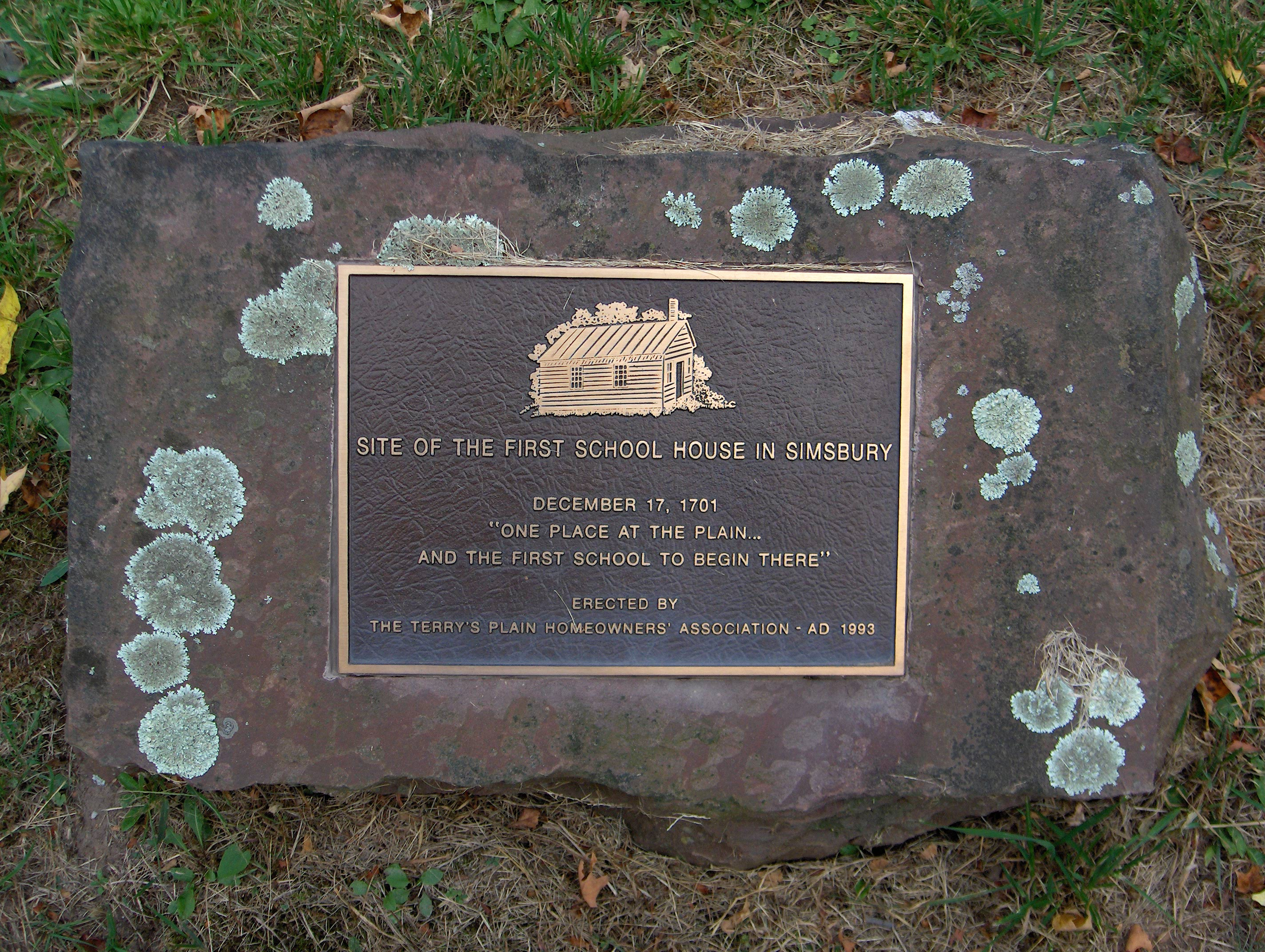
Plaque noting first school site in Simsbury

== See also ==
- National Register of Historic Places listings in Hartford County, Connecticut
