= Alice Merritt =

American politician (1876–1950)

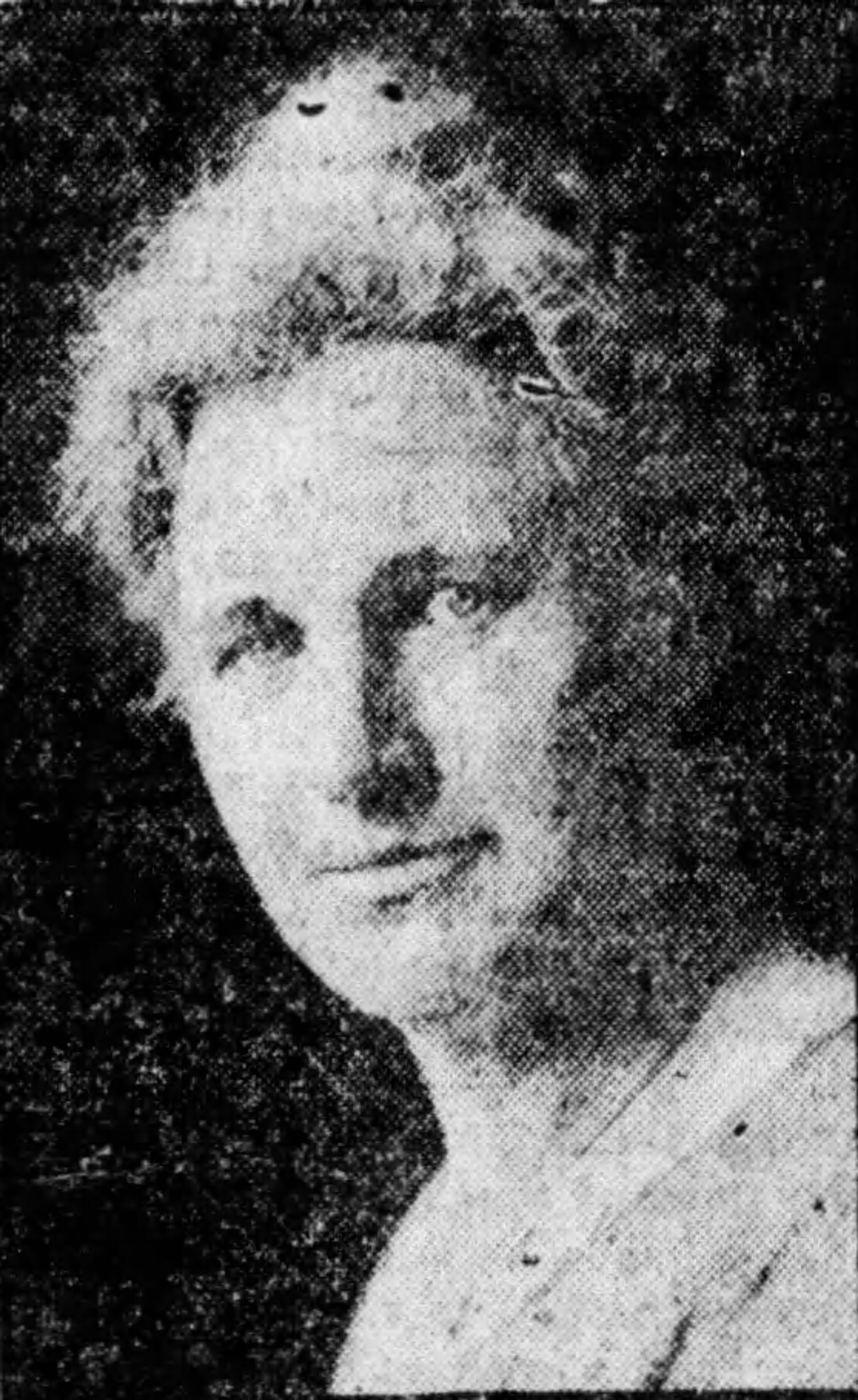

Member of the Connecticut State Senate from the 2nd District
- In office 1925–1929

Personal details
- Born: Alice Virginia Pattison; May 13, 1876 Simsbury, Connecticut, US
- Died: October 17, 1950 (aged 74) Hartford, Connecticut, US
- Party: Republican Party
- Education: Hartford Public High School
- Occupation: Politician, civic leader

Alice Pattison Merritt (May 13, 1876 – October 17, 1950) was an American politician who was the first woman to be elected to the Connecticut State Senate, in 1924. Reelected in 1926, she served in the senate from 1925 to 1929.

== Early life ==
Merritt was born Alice Virginia Pattison in Simsbury, Connecticut, on May 13, 1876, and graduated from Hartford High School in 1895. She worked in insurance until 1903 when she married Joseph Merritt, future president of Hartford Special Machinery Company, which specialized in blueprints. During World War I in 1918, she served as a lieutenant of the Hartford Chapter of the American Red Cross Motor Corps. She was evidently independent enough to drive when most women did not.

== Political career ==
A Republican, Merritt represented Connecticut's 2nd Senate District, which at that time comprised the third, fourth, fifth, and sixth wards of the city of Hartford. In February 1925, Merritt became the first woman to preside over a Connecticut State Senate session. She served on the Education, Capital House and Grounds, and Federal Regulations Committees and chaired the Committee on Humane Institutions. She was a member of the League of Women Voters.

Merritt opposed welfare and other forms of government intervention, voting against a child labor law and strongly supporting President Calvin Coolidge. She cited her husband as her "wisest adviser." While engaged in politics, she was invited to speak at many local and national Republican meetings, including ones in Maryland, Massachusetts, and New York.

== Civic service ==
Merritt was active in the Republican Party and the Girl Scouts of the USA, in addition to singing contralto in church choir. She served on the Republican state central committee and co-founded and served as commissioner of the Hartford Council of Girl Scouts. In 1929, she was appointed New England regional chair of the Girl Scouts and was elected to the board of directors of the national organization in 1943. Camp Alice P. Merritt in Hartland, Connecticut, was named in her honor.

Merritt remained active in civic affairs after leaving office. In 1949, she was serving as a trustee of the Connecticut Valley Hospital. That same year, she was the inaugural recipient of a civil leadership award from the Hartford chapter of the B'nai B'rith Women. The University of Connecticut named a women's dormitory in her honor.

== Personal life ==
Merritt died suddenly while shopping in Hartford on October 17, 1950. Her husband had died in January 1950. She was survived by children Robert, Philip, and Virginia.
