= Norman Pinney =

American educator

Norman Pinney (October 21, 1804 in Simsbury, Connecticut – October 1, 1862 in New Orleans, Louisiana) was an American teacher, minister, and author.

He graduated from Yale College in 1823. In 1826 he became a tutor in Trinity College, Hartford, Connecticut, and in 1828, Professor of the Ancient Languages in the same institution. This position he relinquished in 1831.

Pinney was ordained by Bishop Brownell to the ministry of the Protestant Episcopal Church; for a time he served in Mobile, Alabama but coming to differ from the doctrines of that church, he gave up his charge and became a Unitarian, devoting himself to the education of the young.

He was the author of a well known series of text-books for instruction in the French Language.
