= Drake Hill Road Bridge =

- U.S. National Register of Historic Places
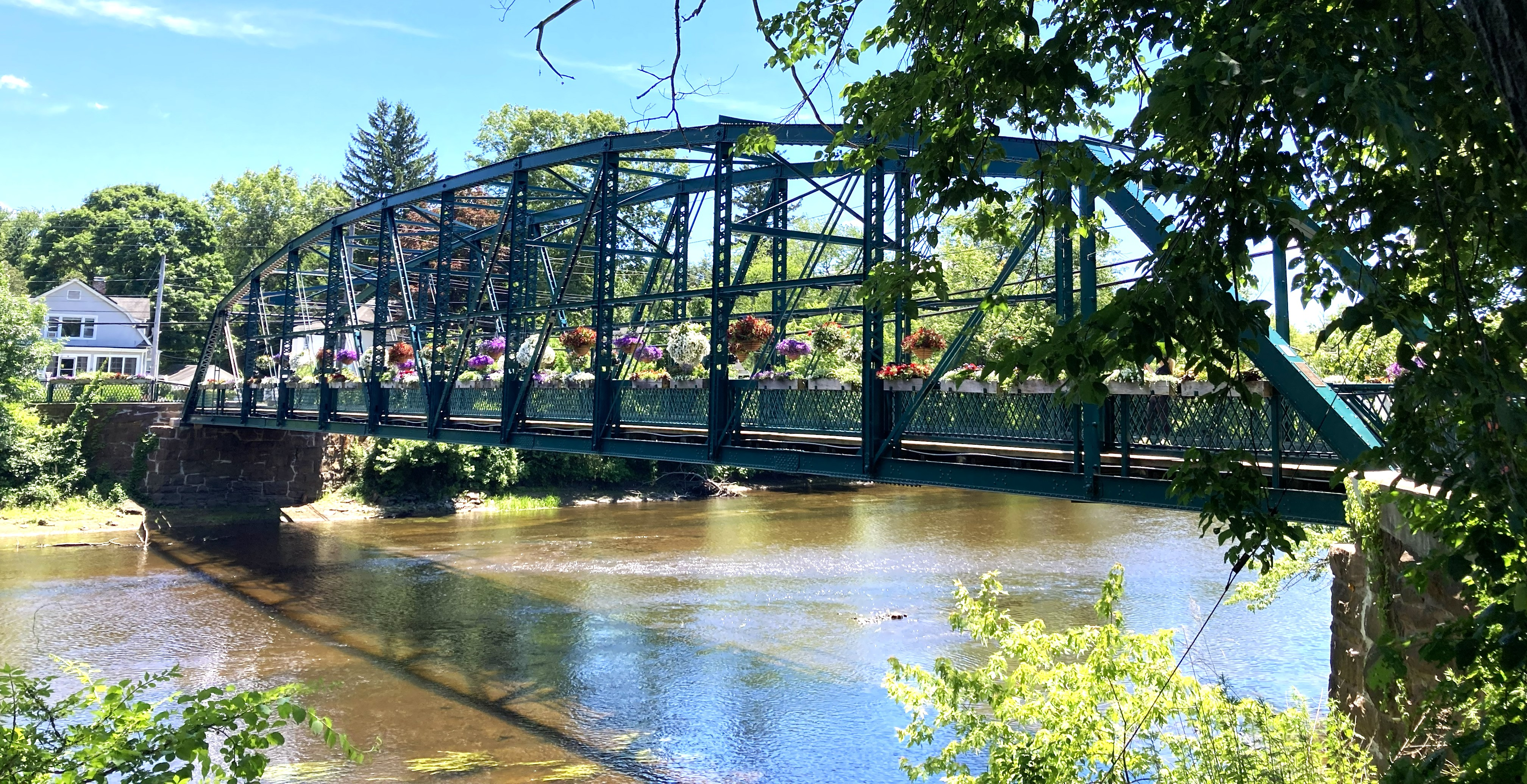
- The bridge, as it looked in June 2026

- Location within Connecticut Location within the United States
- Location: Old Bridge Road at Farmington River, Simsbury, Connecticut
- Coordinates: 41°52′6″N 72°48′1″W
- Area: less than one acre
- Built: 1892
- Architect: Buddington, J. H.
- Architectural style: Parker truss
- NRHP reference No.: 84000999
- Added to NRHP: July 19, 1984

Drake Hill Road Bridge, also known as the Old Drake Hill Flower Bridge, is a bridge in Simsbury, Connecticut, originally carrying Drake Hill Road over the Farmington River. Built in 1892, it is one of three surviving Parker truss bridges in the state. It was listed on the National Register of Historic Places in 1984. It now carries foot traffic only.

== Description and history ==
The Drake Hill Road Bridge is located a short way southeast of the town center of Simsbury. It is located between Old Bridge Road, a former alignment of Drake Hill Road, and Riverside Road, which parallels the east bank of the Farmington River. Drake Hill Road now passes to the north, crossing the river on a modern bridge. This bridge is a single-span, pin-connected Parker through truss constructed with wrought iron, cast iron and steel. It rests on brownstone abutments and carries a 12-foot (3.7 m) roadway for a span of 183 feet (56 m). It has a wooden plank deck suitable for foot traffic, and its sides are adorned with planters that are seasonally filled with flowers.

The bridge was built in 1892, and is one of three 19th-century Parker trusses to survive in the state. All three were designed by J.H. Buddington, an engineer for the state highway department. This bridge was built as a replacement for a timber-frame bridge that previously stood on the site. The town recognized the need for replacing the older structure in 1890, but financing of the replacement delayed its construction. The bridge was taken out of vehicular service in 1992, when the present alignment of Drake Hill Road was established. This bridge is now open strictly for pedestrian and bicycle traffic.

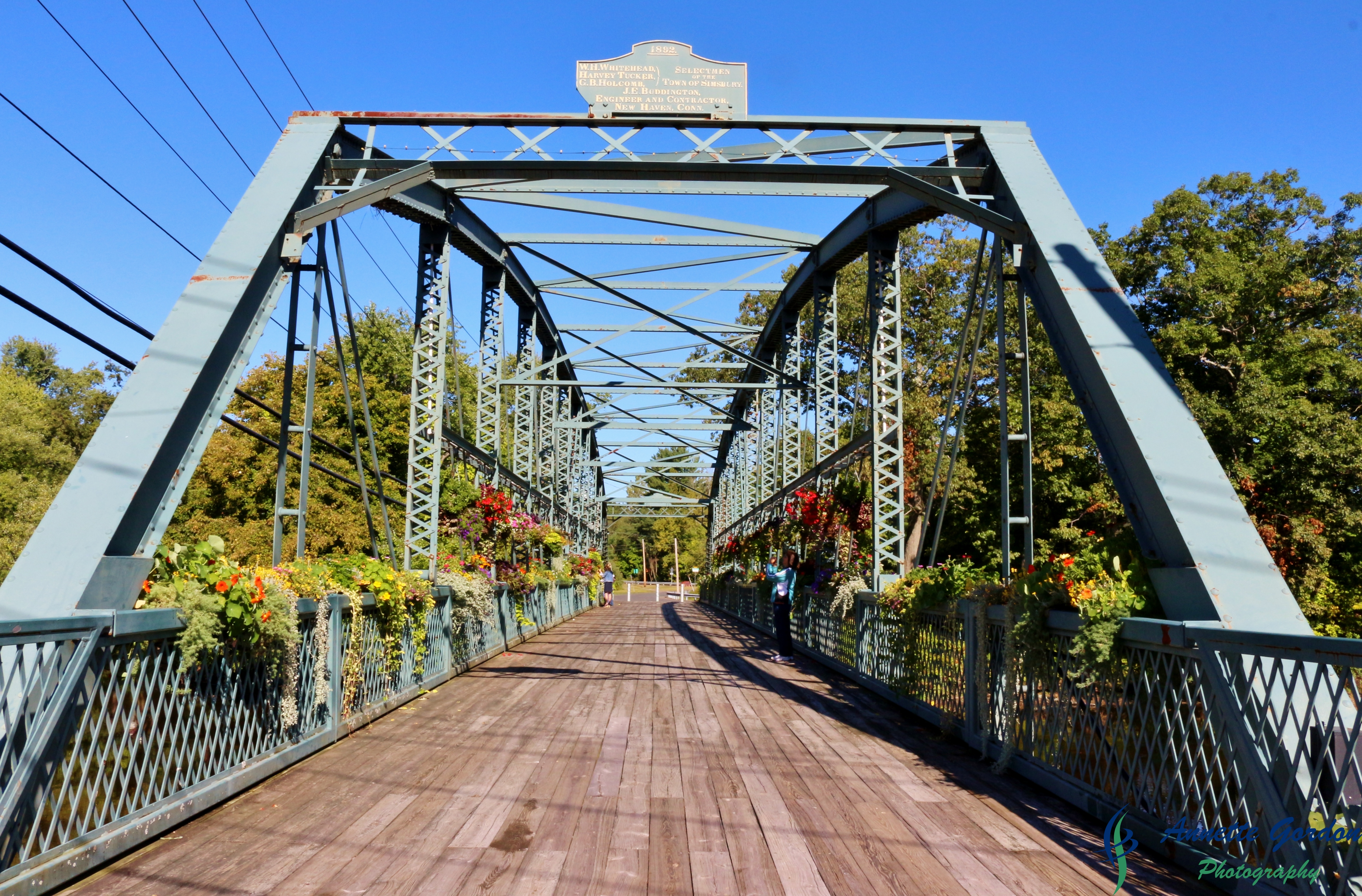
Drake Hill Road Bridge adorned with potted flowers in September 2014

The bridge was closed for repairs in October 2023, and reopened in June 2025 after extensive renovations.

== See also ==
- National Register of Historic Places listings in Hartford County, Connecticut
- List of bridges on the National Register of Historic Places in Connecticut
