= Ensign-Bickford Company =

American explosives manufacturer

Coordinates: 41.8687°N 72.806°W

Ensign-Bickford Aerospace and Defense
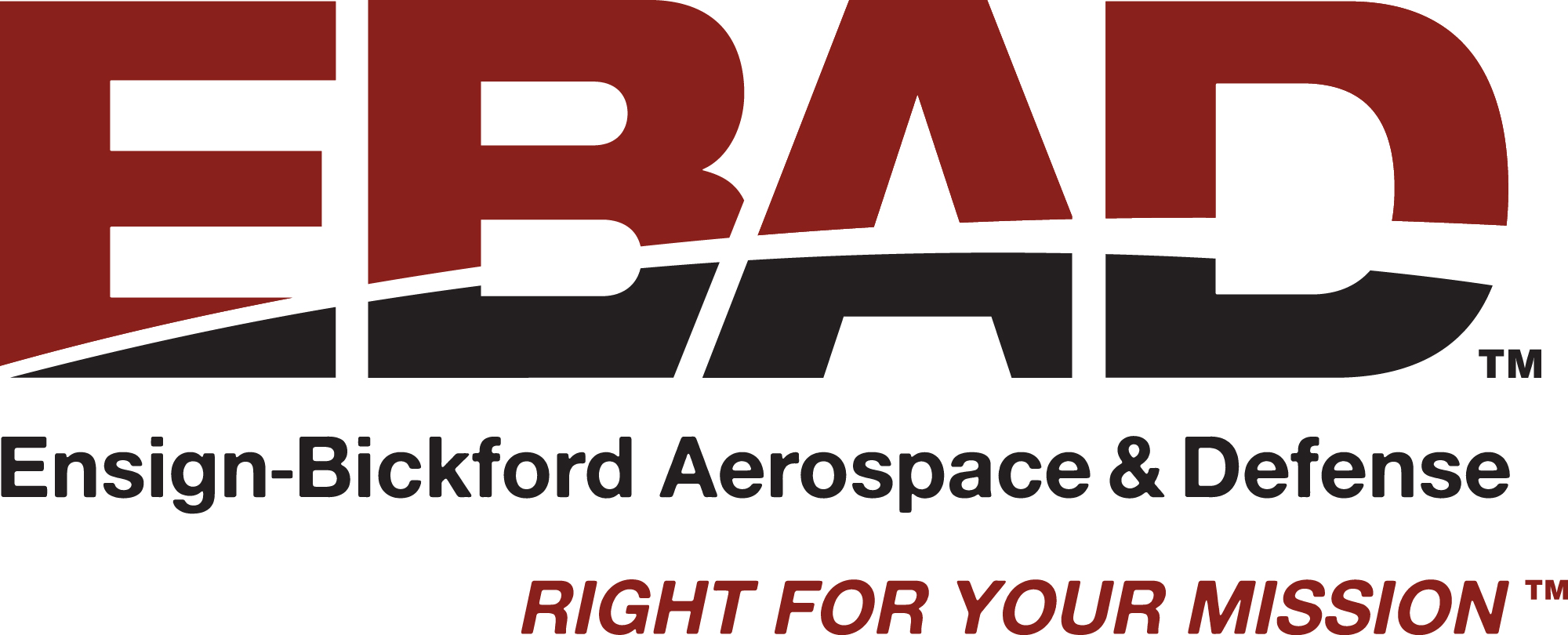

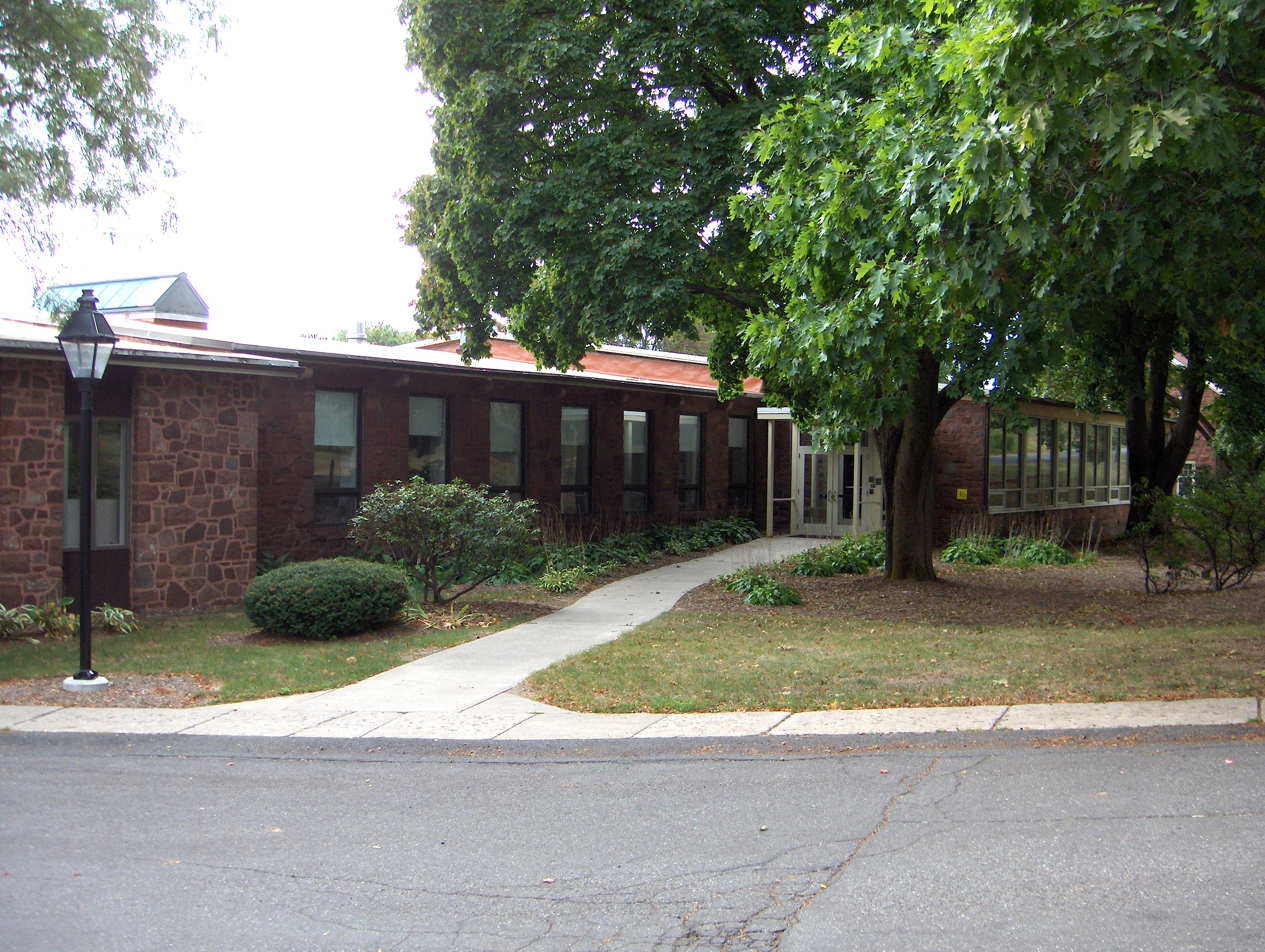
- The company's headquarters in Simsbury, Connecticut
- Trade name: EBAD
- Founded: 1836 in Simsbury, Connecticut, US
- Founder: William Bickford
- Headquarters: Simsbury, Connecticut, United States
- Number of locations: 3 Locations (2025)
- Key people: Jennifer Lewis, President
- Number of employees: 1000+ (Feb 2025)
- Parent: Ensign-Bickford Industries, Inc

The Ensign-Bickford Aerospace & Defense Company (formerly The Ensign-Bickford Company) is a manufacturer of hardware and energetic systems for use in spacecraft, military, and industrial applications. It is a wholly owned subsidiary of Ensign-Bickford Industries.

== History ==
The Ensign-Bickford Company (EBCo) was started in 1836 in Simsbury, Connecticut as a manufacturer of William Bickford's safety fuse for use in mining. Safety fuse was a great advance in mining technology over the practice of filling holes with black powder.

The next step in mining technology was detonating cord. Ensign-Bickford and other companies developed different versions of detonating cord. In 1937, Ensign-Bickford trademarked "Primacord", which became the functional generic name for detonating cord in North America. In May 2003, Ensign-Bickford sold the trademarks and processes to Dyno Nobel Inc of Australia (formerly of Norway).

In 1956, EBCo began providing research and development work for Frankford Arsenal and Sandia National Laboratories to develop linear shaped charge, a product critical to the early strategic missile and launch vehicle programs. In 1965, the Space Ordnance Division was formed, making contributions to early NASA programs such as Mercury, Gemini, and Apollo. In 1987, the Space Ordnance Division became Ensign-Bickford Aerospace Company, a wholly owned subsidiary of EBCo, later becoming The Ensign-Bickford Aerospace & Defense Company.

== Locations ==
In addition to its headquarters and manufacturing operations in Simsbury, Connecticut, EBAD has facilities in Graham, Kentucky, & Moorpark, California.

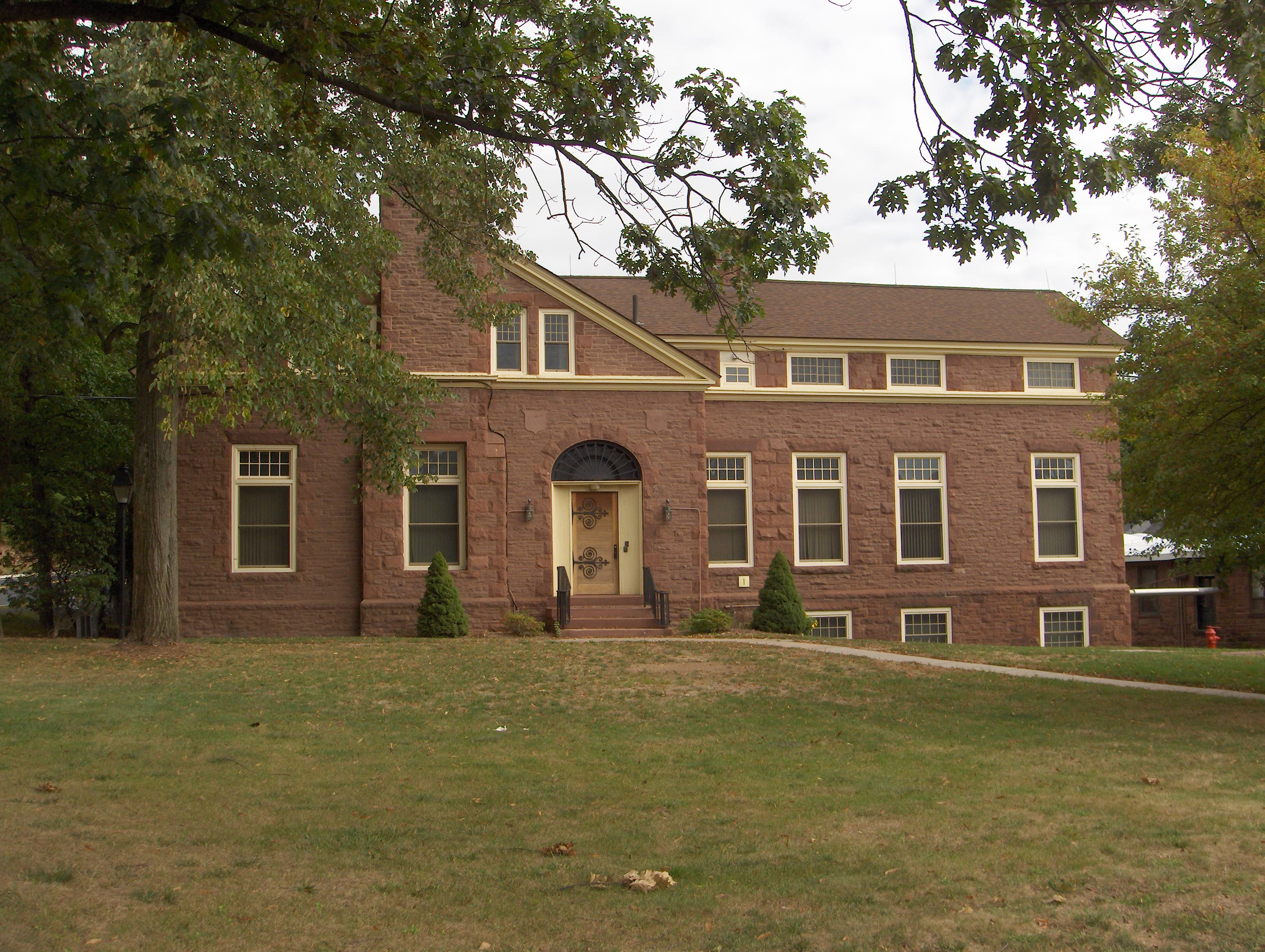
Dyno Nobel building in Simsbury, Connecticut

== Acquisitions ==
Year	Company Acquired
2008	Shock Tube Systems
2010	SDI Defense and Aerospace
2010	NEA Electronics
2017	Honeybee Robotics
2017	TiNi Aerospace, Inc
2017	Honeybee Robotics
2018	Avior Control Technologies, Inc
2019	NEA Electronics
