= Simsbury, Connecticut =

Town in Connecticut, United States

Simsbury
- Town
- Town of Simsbury
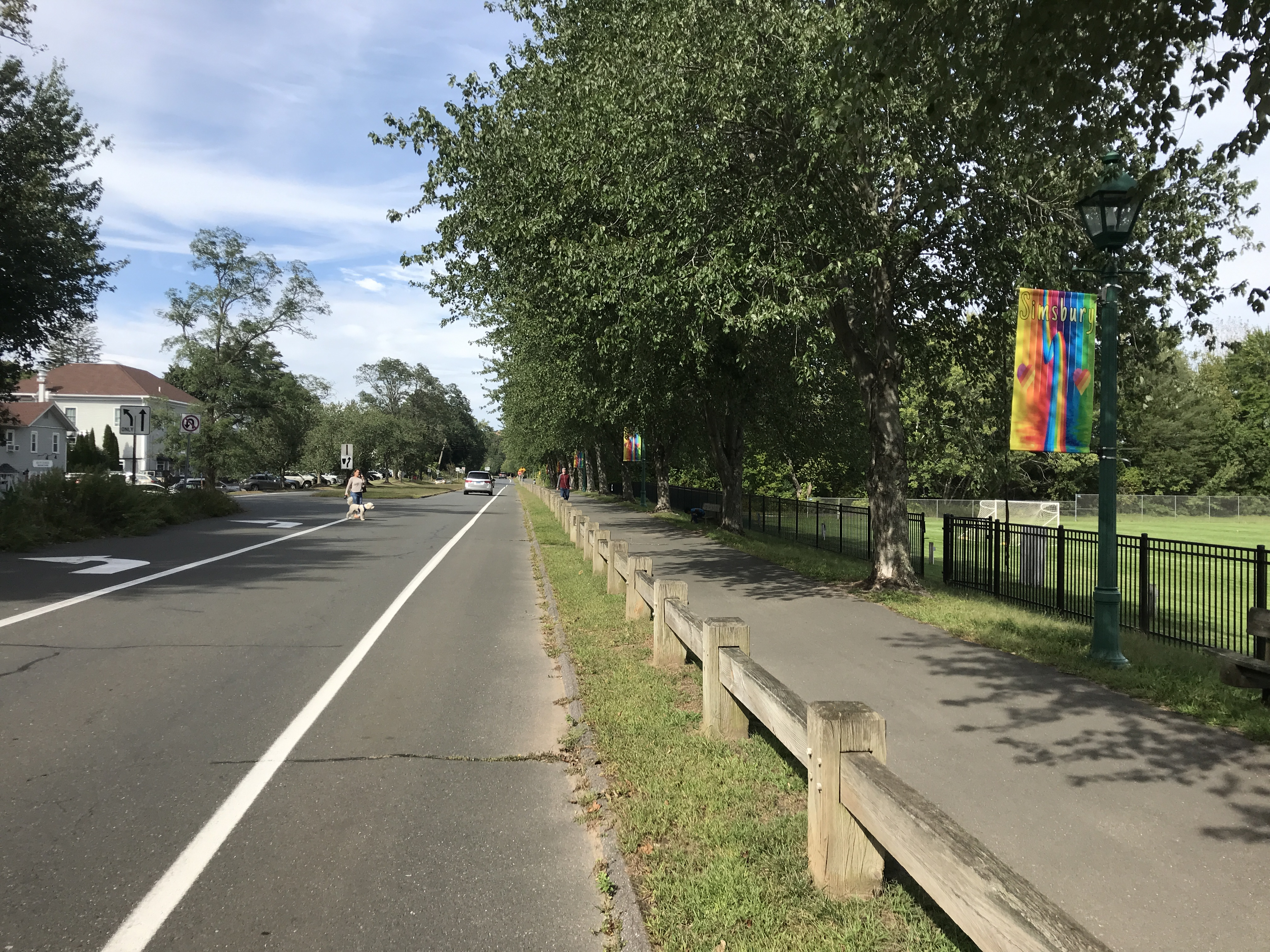
- The Farmington Canal Heritage Trail in Simsbury

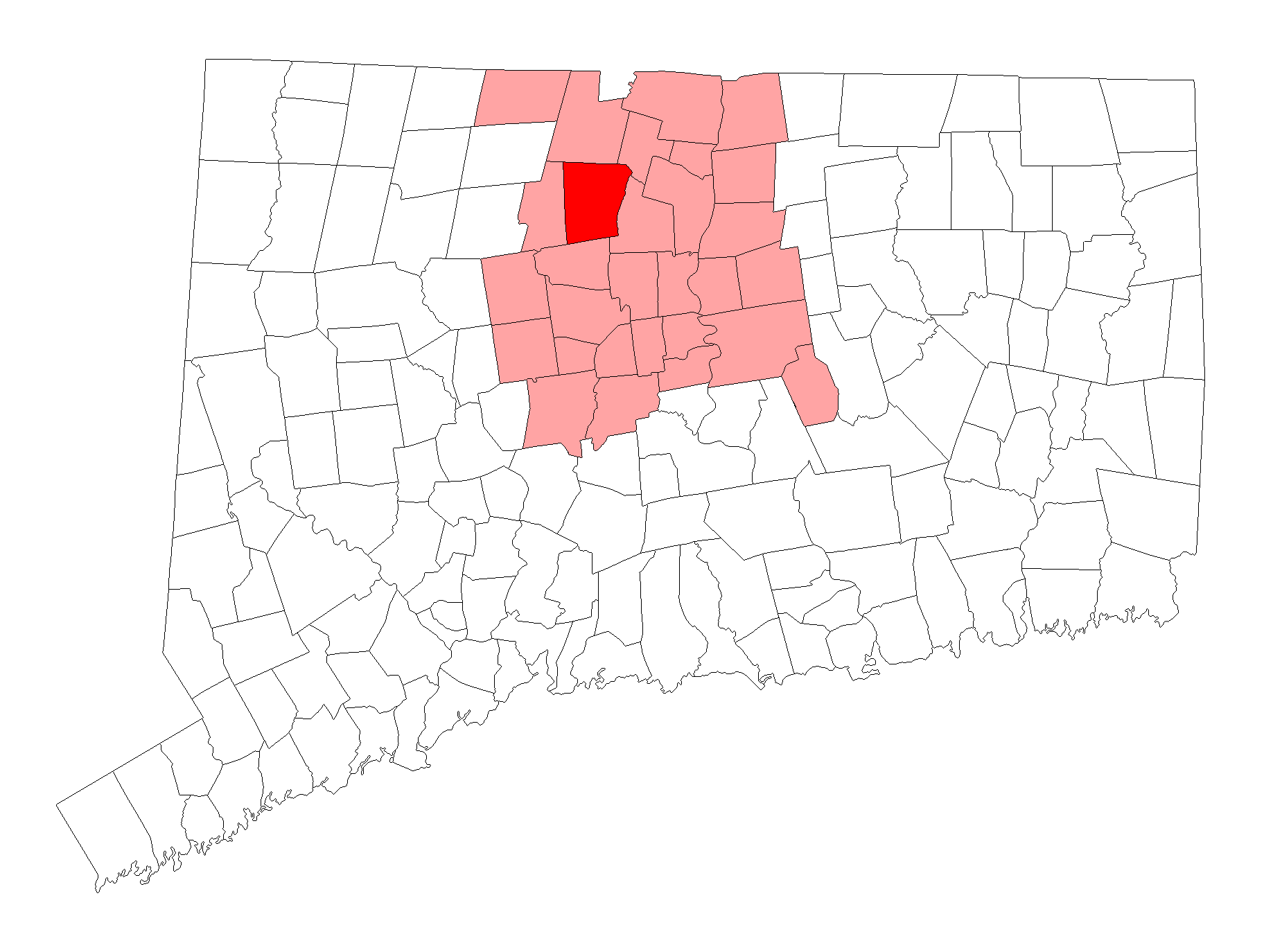
- Coordinates: 41°52′14″N 72°49′31″W
- Country: United States
- U.S. state: Connecticut
- County: Hartford
- Region: Capitol Region
- Settled: 1642
- Named: 1670

Government
  - Type: Town Manager/Board of Selectmen
  - Town Manager: Marc Nelson
  - First Selectmen: Wendy Mackstutis (D)
  - Deputy First Selectmen: Steven Antonio (D)
  - Selectmen: Kevin Beal (R); Curtis Looney (D); Diana Yiesley (D); Mike Paine (R)

Area
  - Total: 34.3 sq mi (88.8 km^{2})
  - Land: 33.9 sq mi (87.9 km^{2})
  - Water: 0.39 sq mi (1.0 km^{2})
- Elevation: 233 ft (71 m)

Population (2020)
  - Total: 24,517
  - Density: 722/sq mi (279/km^{2})
- Time zone: UTC−5 (Eastern)
  - Summer (DST): UTC−4 (Eastern)
- ZIP Codes: 06070, 06081, 06089, 06092
- Area codes: 860/959
- FIPS code: 09-68940
- GNIS feature ID: 0213506
- Website: simsbury-ct.gov

Simsbury is a town in Hartford County, Connecticut, United States, incorporated as Connecticut's 21st town in May 1670. The town is part of the Capitol Planning Region. The population was 24,517 in the 2020 census.

== History ==
=== Early history ===
At the beginning of the 17th century, the area that would become known as Simsbury as of 1670 was inhabited by indigenous peoples. The Wappinger were one of these groups, composed of eighteen bands that were organized not formally as a tribe, but more akin to an association, like the Delaware. These bands lived between the Hudson and Connecticut rivers. The Wappingers were one of the Algonquian peoples, a linguistic grouping which includes hundreds of tribes. One of the Wappinger bands, the Massaco, lived near, but mostly west of, what became known as the Farmington River, in the area that would become known as Simsbury and Canton, the latter as of 1806.

In 1633, Windsor was the second town in Connecticut settled by Europeans and the first English settlement (the first European settlement being Huys de Goede Hoop, established by the Dutch in the Hartford area as a frontier settlement for the New Netherland Colony ten years earlier). For some time, the area of Massaco was considered "an appendix to the towne of Windsor." Settlers in Windsor forested and farmed in the area, but did not settle in Massaco permanently for a number of years. In 1642, the General Court of the colony of Connecticut ordered that:

the Governor and Mr. Heynes shall have liberty to dispose of the ground uppon that parte of Tunxis River cauled Mossocowe, to such inhabitants of Wyndsor as they shall see cause.

Despite this order, there is no record that any settlements immediately ensued. Five years later the General Court issued another order:

The Court thinks fitt that Massacoe be purchased by the Country, and that ther be a Committee chosen to dispose of yt to such inhabitants of Wyndsor as by the shalbe judged meet to make improuement therof...

but there is no record of land grants arising from this order.

In 1643, John Griffin and Michael Humphrey started a tar and turpentine business in Windsor. A few years later, a Massaco Indian named Manahanoose started a fire which destroyed tar belonging to Griffin. The Court ordered the payment of "five hundred fathom of wampum" as compensation. As he was unable to pay this amount, Manahanoose was instead ordered by the Court to either serve Griffin or be exchanged for Black slaves. To avoid this, he instead delivered a deed to the land at Massacoe. The deed was agreed to by Manahanoose as well as other Indians, identified as "the proprietors of Massaco". In 1653, the General Court granted 50 acres (200,000 m^{2}) of meadowland to Lieutenant Aaron Cook, 60 acres (240,000 m^{2}) to John Bissell and 50 acres (200,000 m^{2}) to Thomas Ford, all in Massacoe.

Settlers did not build permanent settlements until the following decade. Aaron Cook built one of the early homes in the area established c.1660 as Terry's Plain, and John Griffin also built a home, possibly in 1664—the date associated with a deed to land in Massacoe. The settlement of Massacoe continued in the late 1660s. The General Court awarded a land grant of two hundred acres to John Griffin in 1663. A deed description from 1664 indicates he had become a permanent inhabitant. In 1669, a survey found that there were thirteen permanent residents of Massacoe. One of those residents, John Case, was appointed to the position of constable. This is the first recorded civil office held by residents of the area.

=== Incorporation ===
In 1670, John Case, along with Joshua Holcomb & Thomas Barber, presented a petition to the General Court, requesting that Massacoe become a town of the colony of Connecticut. On May 12, 1670, the General Court granted the petition, and ordered that the plantation should be called "Simmsbury". The boundaries at that time were Farmington on the south and Windsor on the east, with the extent of Simsbury running 10 miles (16 km) north of Farmington and 10 miles (16 km) west of Windsor. The northern border, subject to dispute with Massachusetts, was left to be resolved later. This area includes the township Simsbury as well as Granby and Canton, which would later separate from Simsbury in 1786 and 1806, respectively.

The precise origin of the name of the town is not known for certain. The town records covering the first ten years after incorporation were accidentally burned in 1680 and 1681. One possibility is that the name of Simsbury comes from the English town of Symondsbury. Holcomb, one of the petitioners, originally came from Symondsbury. Another possibility is that the name was derived from Simon Wolcott's name. He was known familiarly as "Sim", and he was considered one of the prominent men of the town.

=== King Philip's War ===
In 1675, rumors of unrest among the indigenous peoples began to surface. The rumors proved accurate, and King Philip's War, a war between a number of tribes and the New England settlers, began in the summer. The war extended through parts of four colonies, with Simsbury on the western edge of the conflict. At the time, it was seen as a frontier settlement. The conflict was largely over by August 1676, although it did not formally end until a treaty was signed in 1678.

The colony of Connecticut formed a Council of War. In the days leading up to the war, they ordered settlers to keep night watches and to work in the fields in armed groups of at least six. By the time of the colony's General Court meeting of October 14, 1675, the situation was considered serious enough that the court ordered the residents of Simsbury to move to safety in Windsor. The order read:

This Court orders, that the people of Simsbury shall have a week's time to secure themselves and their corn there, and at the end of the week from this date, the souldiers, now in garrison at Simsbury, shall be released their attendance there.

— Colony of Connecticut General Court

In March 1676, the town of Simsbury was first pillaged, then burned to the ground. This destruction has been described as the most extensive of any event of any Indian War in New England. The settlers remained in Windsor until the spring of 1677, during which most moved back to Simsbury, though some never returned.

=== Daniel Hayes ===
In 1707, Daniel Hayes, then aged twenty-two, was captured by indigenous people and carried to Canada. The capture was witnessed and a rescue party was raised, but the group did not catch up with the captors. Hayes was tied up each night and bound to saplings. It took thirty days to reach Canada, where Hayes was forced to run the gauntlet. Near the end of the gauntlet, he hid in a wigwam to avoid an attempted blow by a club. The woman in the wigwam declared that the house was sacred and, having lost a husband and son to a war, adopted Hayes as her son. He remained for several years, attending to the woman. Eventually, he was sold to a Frenchman, who learned that Hayes had skill as a weaver and put him to work in that business. Hayes managed to earn enough to buy his freedom after two years. He then returned to Simsbury, settled down on a farm and married. He became a prominent figure in civil affairs, as well as the church at Salmon Brook (now Granby).

=== Patent Safety Fuse factory explosion ===
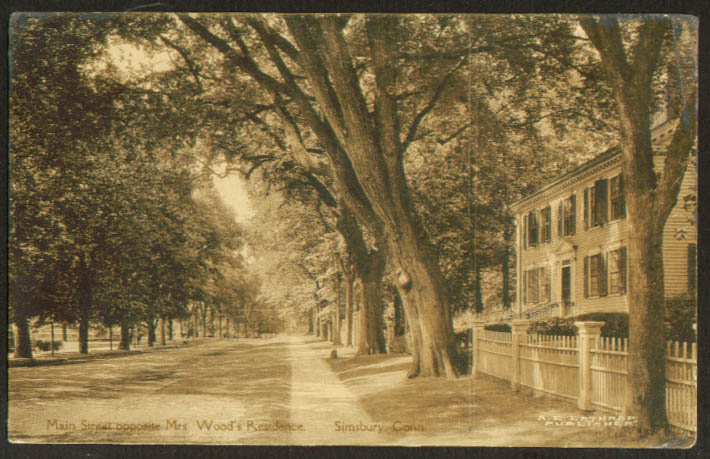
Main Street in 1921

On Tuesday, December 20, 1859, the two-story Patent Safety Fuse factory located near the center of town exploded, killing seven women and one man. The blast also injured several other people, including the factory owner. The factory made cord fast-burning fuses used for blasting, which resulted in the explosion. Two days later, on Thursday, December 22, 1859, the New York Times ran a story about the explosion.

== Geography ==
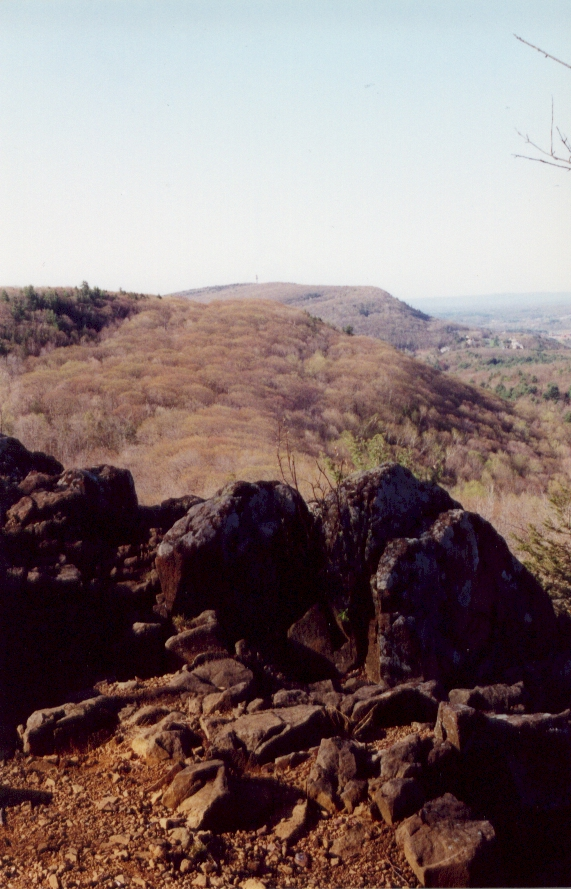
Talcott Mountain ridgeline

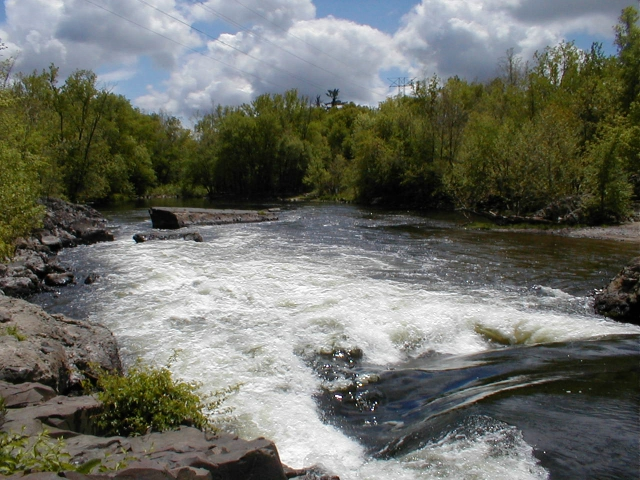
The Farmington River in Simsbury

According to the United States Census Bureau, the town has a total area of 34.3 square miles (88.8 km^{2}), of which 33.9 square miles (87.9 km^{2}) is land and 0.39 square miles (1.0 km^{2}), or 1.09%, is water.

Simsbury lies in the northern end of the Farmington Valley. The east side of Simsbury is flanked by Talcott Mountain, which is part of the Metacomet Ridge, a mountainous trap rock ridgeline that stretches from Long Island Sound to near the Vermont border. Notable features of the Metacomet Ridge in Simsbury include Heublein Tower, Talcott Mountain State Park, Penwood State Park, and the Tariffville Gorge of the Farmington River. The 51-mile-long (82 km) Metacomet Trail traverses the ridge. At the western foot of the mountain, the Pinchot Sycamore, the largest tree in Connecticut, grows near the Farmington River. Simsbury also has some patches of old-growth forest; Belden Forest, a 40-acre site with public hiking trails near the center of town was inducted into the Old-Growth Forest Network in October 2019.

The town is often considered a bedroom community for the nearby city of Hartford, Connecticut, which is a 20 to 25 minute drive from Simsbury Center; however, many residents also commute to other towns and cities within the west-central Connecticut region.

=== Principal communities ===
After the complete destruction of the town in 1676 during King Philip's War, there were three late 17th to early 18th century nucleated resettlement communities: East Weatogue (also called East Simsbury), Simsbury Center, and Terry's Plain.

There are four census-designated places in Simsbury: Simsbury Center, Tariffville, Weatogue, and West Simsbury.

=== Climate ===
Climate data for Simsbury, Connecticut
| Month | Jan | Feb | Mar | Apr | May | Jun | Jul | Aug | Sep | Oct | Nov | Dec | Year |
|---|---|---|---|---|---|---|---|---|---|---|---|---|---|
| Record high °F (°C) | 72 (22) | 73 (23) | 89 (32) | 96 (36) | 99 (37) | 101 (38) | 102 (39) | 102 (39) | 101 (38) | 91 (33) | 83 (28) | 76 (24) | 102 (39) |
| Mean daily maximum °F (°C) | 34 (1) | 39 (4) | 48 (9) | 61 (16) | 71 (22) | 80 (27) | 85 (29) | 83 (28) | 75 (24) | 63 (17) | 52 (11) | 40 (4) | 61 (16) |
| Mean daily minimum °F (°C) | 18 (−8) | 21 (−6) | 28 (−2) | 38 (3) | 48 (9) | 57 (14) | 63 (17) | 61 (16) | 53 (12) | 41 (5) | 33 (1) | 23 (−5) | 40 (5) |
| Record low °F (°C) | −26 (−32) | −24 (−31) | −8 (−22) | 9 (−13) | 28 (−2) | 37 (3) | 44 (7) | 36 (2) | 27 (−3) | 17 (−8) | 1 (−17) | −18 (−28) | −26 (−32) |
| Average precipitation inches (mm) | 3.23 (82) | 3.00 (76) | 3.62 (92) | 3.72 (94) | 4.35 (110) | 4.35 (110) | 4.18 (106) | 3.93 (100) | 3.88 (99) | 4.37 (111) | 3.89 (99) | 3.44 (87) | 45.96 (1,166) |

== Demographics ==
Historical population
| Census | Pop. | Note | %± |
|---|---|---|---|
| 1820 | 1,875 | | — |
| 1850 | 2,737 | | — |
| 1860 | 2,410 | | −11.9% |
| 1870 | 2,051 | | −14.9% |
| 1880 | 1,830 | | −10.8% |
| 1890 | 1,874 | | 2.4% |
| 1900 | 2,094 | | 11.7% |
| 1910 | 2,537 | | 21.2% |
| 1920 | 2,958 | | 16.6% |
| 1930 | 3,625 | | 22.5% |
| 1940 | 3,941 | | 8.7% |
| 1950 | 4,822 | | 22.4% |
| 1960 | 10,138 | | 110.2% |
| 1970 | 17,475 | | 72.4% |
| 1980 | 21,161 | | 21.1% |
| 1990 | 22,023 | | 4.1% |
| 2000 | 23,234 | | 5.5% |
| 2010 | 23,511 | | 1.2% |
| 2020 | 24,517 | | 4.3% |
U.S. Decennial Census

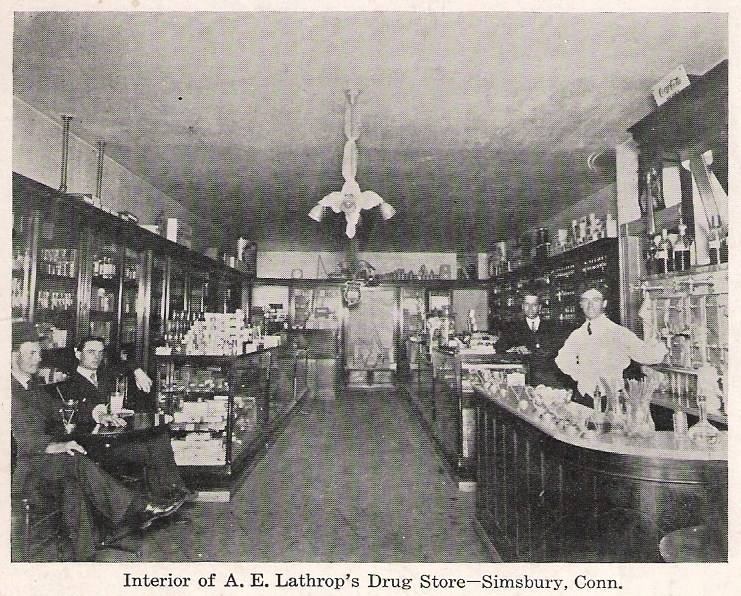
A. E. Lathrop's Drug Store, c. 1905

As of the census of 2000, there were 23,234 people, 8,527 households, and 6,591 families residing in the town. The population density was 685.7 inhabitants per square mile (264.8/km^{2}). There were 8,739 housing units at an average density of 257.9 per square mile (99.6/km^{2}). The racial makeup of the town was 95.3% White, 1.17% African American, 0.09% Native American, 2.12% Asian, 0.03% Pacific Islander, 0.26% from other races, and 1.03% from two or more races. Hispanic or Latino people of any race were 1.54% of the population. The five largest percentages of reported ethnicity, expressed as percentage out of total residents, were Irish (23.0%), English (17.4%), German (15.6%), Italian (13.7%), and Polish (7.6%).

There were 8,527 households, out of which 41.1% had children under the age of 18 living with them, 69.1% were married couples living together, 6.4% had a female householder with no husband present, and 22.7% were non-families. 19.4% of all households had someone living alone, and 7.8% had someone living alone who was 65 years of age or older. The average household size was 2.70 and the average family size was 3.12.

29.5% of the population was under the age of 18, 3.6% were from 18 to 24, 27.7% were from 25 to 44, 26.6% were from 45 to 64, and 12.5% were 65 years of age or older. The median age was 40 years old. For every 100 females, there were 94.6 males. For every 100 females age 18 and over, there were 89.3 males.

In 2018, the median household income was $119,588 and the per capita income for the town was $60,453. About 1.0% of families and 2.2% of the population were below the poverty line, including 1.6% of those under age 18 and 4.3% of those age 65 or over.

== Economy ==
=== Top employers ===
According to Simsbury's 2024 Comprehensive Annual Financial Report, the top employers in the city are:

| # | Employer | # of employees |
|---|---|---|
| 1 | Simsbury Board of Education | 651 |
| 2 | Ensign-Bickford Company | 500-999 |
| 3 | Wings Media Group | 500-999 |
| 4 | Everest Global Svc | 500-999 |
| 5 | Chubb | 250-499 |
| 6 | Keller Williams Realty | 250-499 |
| 7 | Hoffman Auto Group | 250-499 |
| 8 | McLean Home Care | 250-499 |
| 9 | The Hartford | |
| 10 | Stop & Shop | |

== Landmarks ==
- The Ethel Walker School, The Master's School, St. Mary's School, and Westminster School are private schools in Simsbury.
- The International Skating Center of Connecticut is in Simsbury.
- Three of the four state parks in Hartford County, Penwood State Park, Stratton Brook State Park, and Talcott Mountain State Park, are in Simsbury.
- Simsbury Airport is a public use airport located in Simsbury and East Granby.
- Ensign-Bickford Industries, founded in Simsbury in 1836, is still headquartered in town.
- The Pinchot Sycamore, an American sycamore in Simsbury, is the largest tree in Connecticut. According to a measurement made in 1998, the tree was 26 feet (7.9 m) around and 95 feet (29 m) tall, with an average canopy diameter of 140 feet (43 m).

=== On the National Register of Historic Places ===
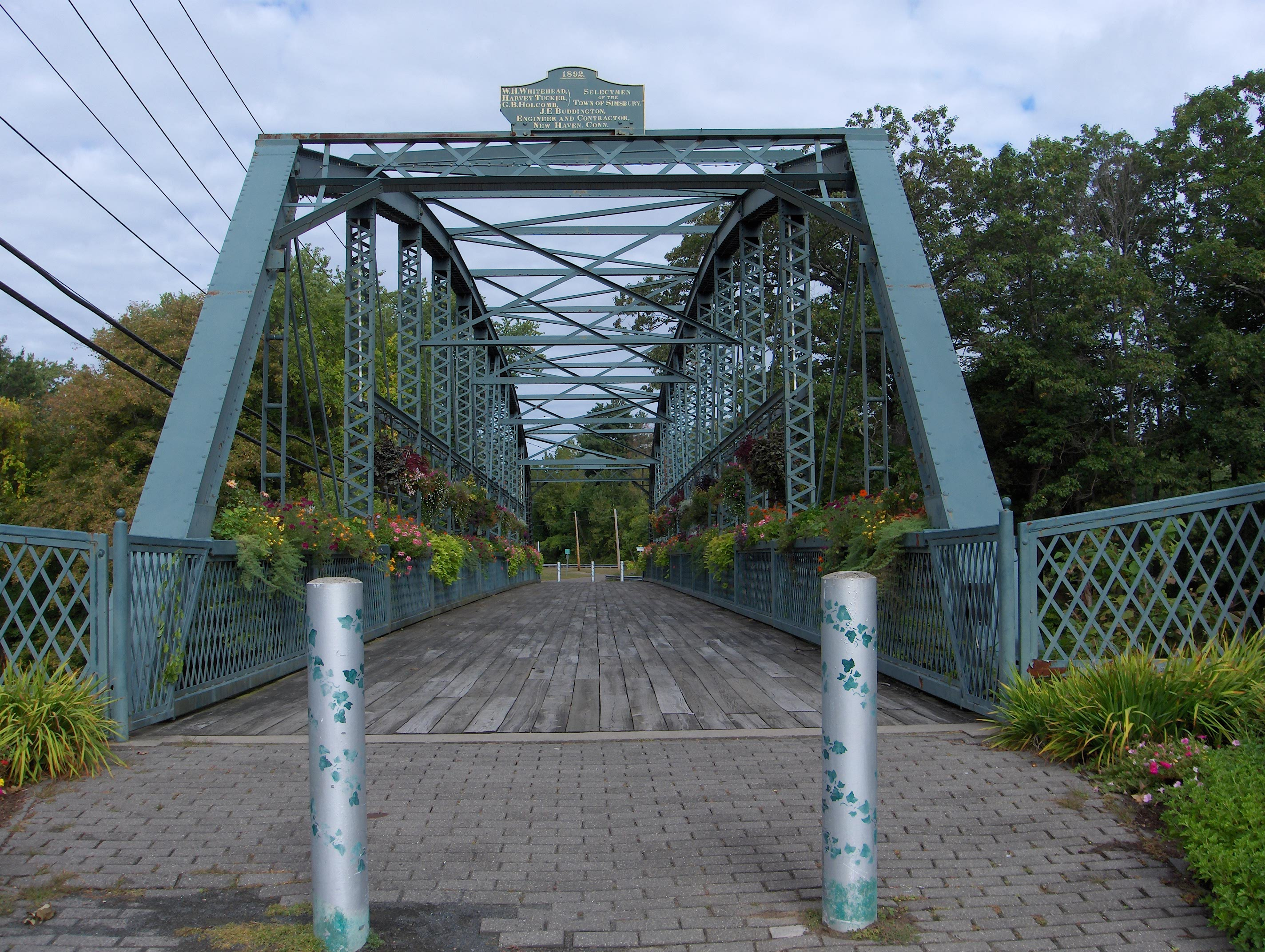
Drake Hill Road Bridge (1892)

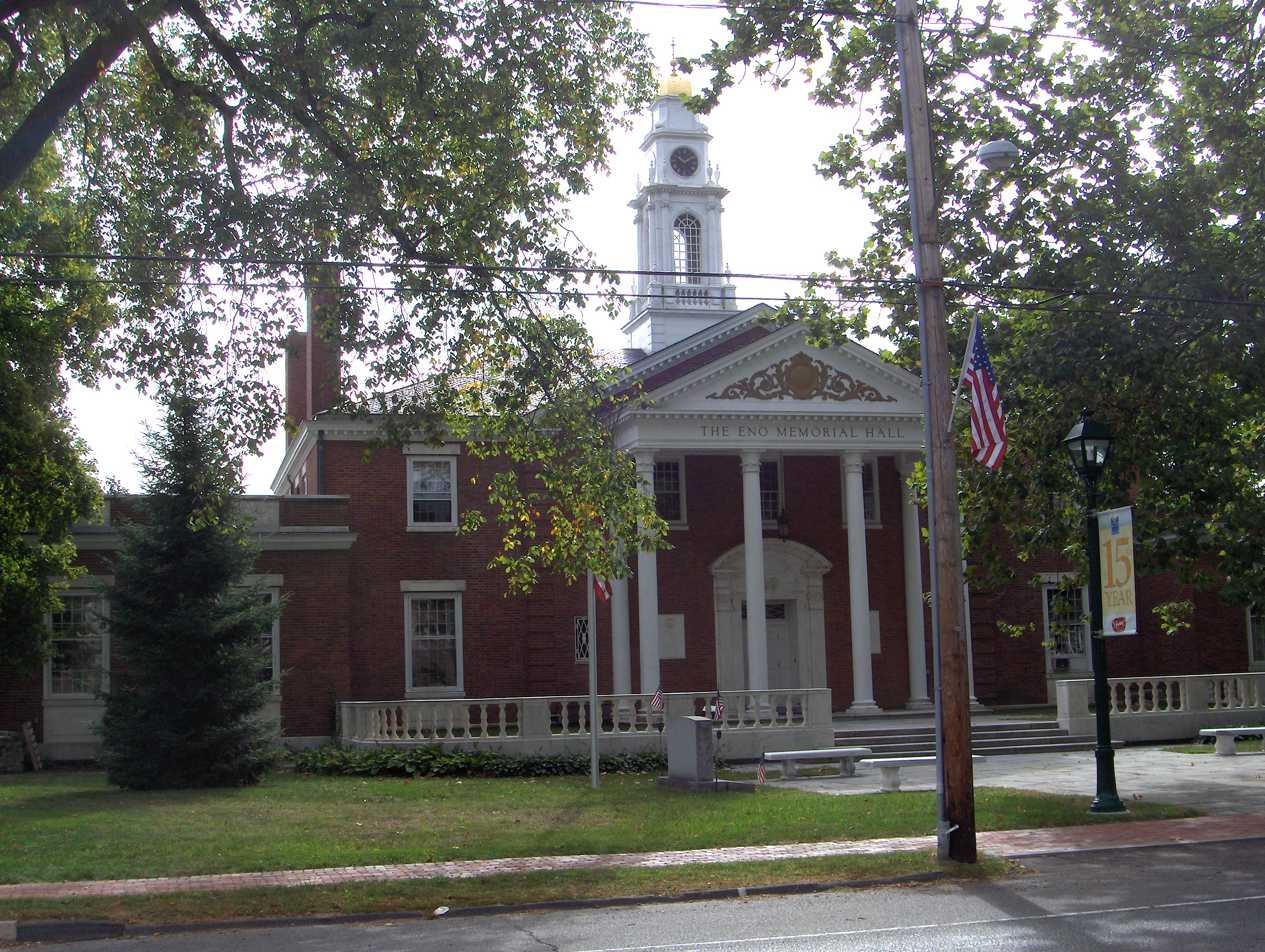
Eno Memorial Hall

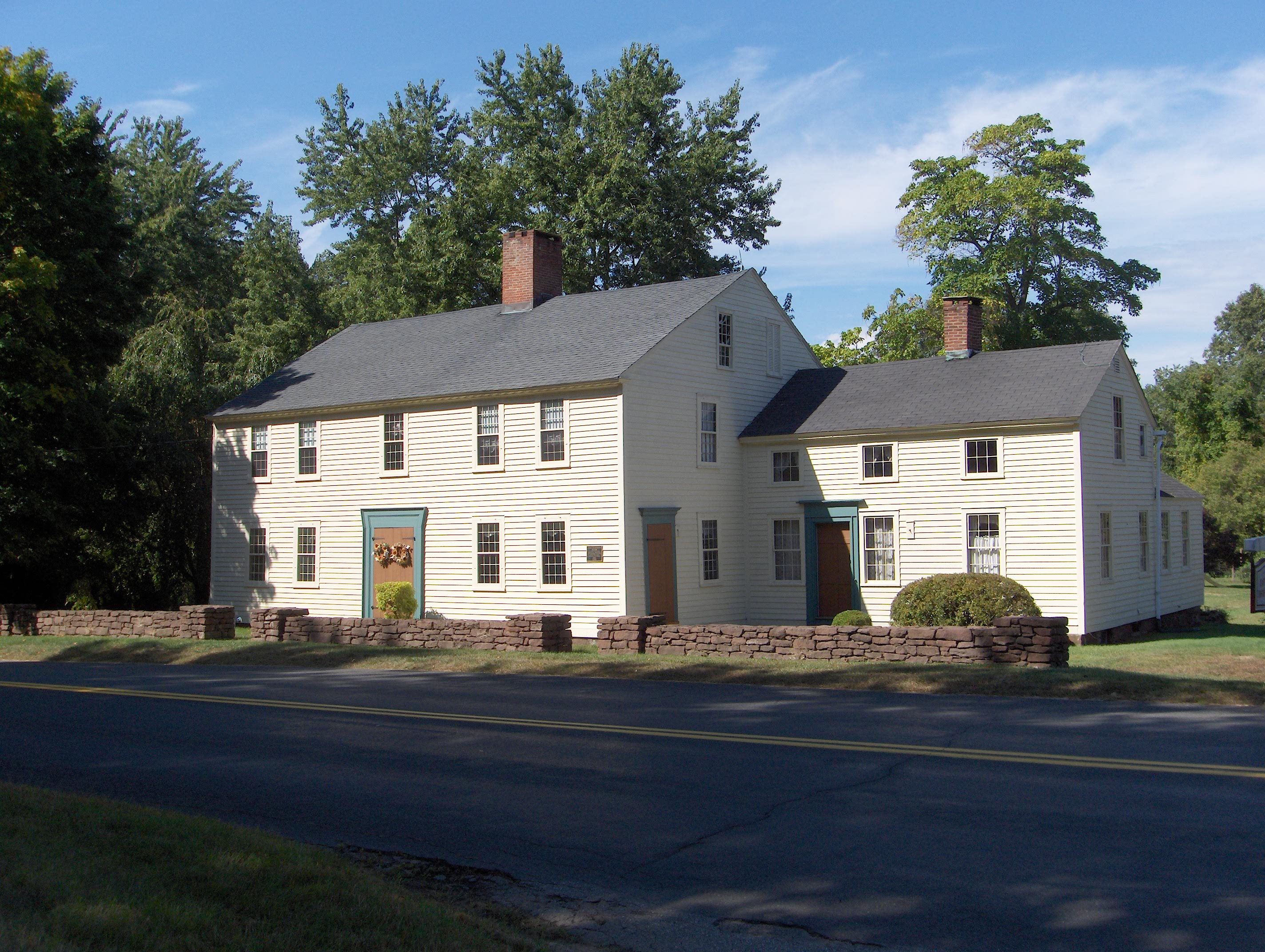
John Humphrey House

- Drake Hill Road Bridge – Drake Hill Road at Farmington River (added August 19, 1984). The Drake Hill Bridge is a pin-connected Parker truss, built in 1892 over the Farmington River. The bridge has a 12-foot (3.7 m) roadway and a span of 183 feet (56 m). It originally carried vehicle traffic but now is open for foot and bicycle traffic. This bridge is one of only three surviving Parker trusses in Connecticut.
- East Weatogue Historic District – Roughly covers the properties on East Weatogue Street from just north of Riverside Drive to Hartford Road and Folly Farm property to the south (added 1990).
- Heublein Tower – Talcott Mountain State Park (added 1983).
- John Humphrey House – 115 East Weatogue Street (added 1990). The John Humphrey House is a Colonial two-story frame house, built c.1760. The estimate of the building date comes partially from land records, and partially from the location of the bake oven in the kitchen.
- Massaco Forest Pavilion – Off Farms Village Road, Stratton Brook State Park (added 1986).
- Simsbury Center Historic District – Roughly, Hopmeadow Street from West Street to Massaco Street (added 1996).
  - Amos Eno House – Off U.S.202 on Hopmeadow Road. (added 1975). Also known as the Simsbury House or the 1820 House, this house was built by Elisha Phelps but named after Amos Eno, who used it as a summer residence for many years.
  - Eno Memorial Hall – 754 Hopmeadow Street (added 1993).
  - Horace Belden School (now the Town Hall/Police Station) and Central Grammar School – 933 Hopmeadow Street and 29 Massaco Street (added 1993).
  - Robert and Julia Darling House – 720 Hopmeadow Street (added 1991).
  - Capt. Elisha Phelps House (also known as "Phelps Tavern Museum & Homestead") – 800 Hopmeadow Street, a 1771 house used as a tavern from 1786 to 1849 (added 1972).
  - Simsbury Bank and Trust Company Building – 760–762 Hopmeadow Street (added 1986).
  - Simsbury Railroad Depot – Railroad Avenue at Station Street (added 1976).
  - Simsbury Townhouse – 695 Hopmeadow Street (added 1993). The Simsbury Townhouse was the original town hall for the town of Simsbury, used as a town hall for almost 100 years. It was originally built in 1839 at the top of the hill near its present location, and moved, possibly in 1843, and finally in 1869. The wooden structure was constructed in the Greek Revival style.
- Tariffville Historic District – Roughly bounded by Winthrop Street, Main Street, Tunxis Road, Mountain Road, and Elm Street (added 1993).
- Terry's Plain Historic District – Roughly bounded by Pharos, Quarry and Terry's Plain Roads, and the Farmington Road (added 1993).

== Schools ==
=== Public high schools ===
- Simsbury High School (students: 1,457; location: 34 Farms Village Road; grades, 9–12)

=== Private high schools ===
- Ethel Walker School (students: 252; location: 230 Bushy Hill Road; grades: 6–12; Girls only)
- The Master's School (students: 400; location: 36 Westledge Road; grades Pre-K – 12)
- Westminster School (students: 353; location: 995 Hopmeadow Street; grades: 9–12)

=== Public primary/middle schools ===
- Central School (students: 479; location: 29 Massaco Street; grades: Pre-K–6)
- Henry James Memorial School (students: 840; location: 155 Firetown Road; grades: 7–8)
- Homebound (location: 933 Hopmeadow Street; grades: Pre-K–12)
- Latimer Lane School (students: 623; location: 33 Mountain View Road; grades: K–6)
- Squadron Line School (students: 849; location: 44 Squadron Line Road; grades: Pre-K–6)
- Tariffville School (students: 280; location: 42 Winthrop Street; grades: K–6)
- Tootin' Hills School (students: 537; location: 25 Nimrod Road; grades: K–6)

=== Private primary/middle schools ===
- The Cobb School Montessori (students: 145; location: 112 Sand Hill Road; grades: Pre-K–5)
- St. Mary's School (students: 264; location: 946 Hopmeadow Street; grades: Pre-K–8)

== Notable people ==
=== Athletes ===
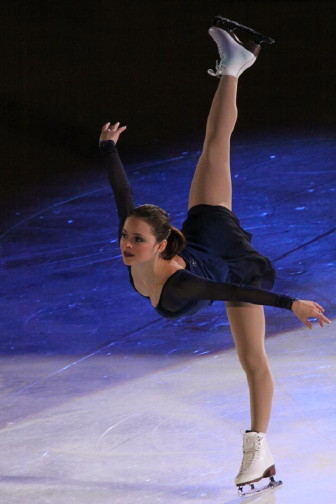
Sasha Cohen

- Shizuka Arakawa (荒川 静香) (born 1981), Japanese figure skater; won the gold medal at the 2006 Winter Olympics; has trained at the International Skating Center of Connecticut in Simsbury
- Oksana Baiul (born 1977), 1994 Olympic champion; lived and trained in Simsbury after winning her title
- Vince Cazzetta (1925–2005), head coach for the Pittsburgh Pipers
- Sasha Cohen (born 1984), 2006 U.S. National Champion figure skater and silver medalist at the 2006 Olympics; trained in Simsbury with Russian coach Tatiana Tarasova starting in summer 2002
- Tommy Cross (born 1989), pro ice hockey player drafted by the Boston Bruins in 2008; now with the St. Louis Blues
- Ekaterina Gordeeva (born 1971), winner of two Olympic gold medals (1988 and 1994); moved to Simsbury in the 1990s
- Sara Hendershot (born 1988), member of 2012 United States Olympic Rowing Team (W2-)
- Paul Holmgren (born 1955), former coach of the Hartford Whalers; current president of the Philadelphia Flyers
- Michelle Kwan (born 1980), Olympic figure skater; has trained at the International Skating Center of Connecticut
- Mike Liut (born 1956), former NHL goaltender for the Hartford Whalers
- Viktor Petrenko (born 1969), 1992 Olympic champion; trained in Simsbury beginning in 1994
- Ulf Samuelsson (born 1964), former NHL hockey player, lived in Simsbury when he played for the Hartford Whalers
- Alexei Yagudin (born 1980), 2002 Olympic champion and four time world champion; lived and trained in Simsbury from 1998 to 2005 with Tatiana Tarasova

=== Media ===
- Lake Bell (born 1979), actor, attended Westminster School in Simsbury, Connecticut
- Terry Deitz (born 1959), reality TV contestant, resides in Simsbury
- Rachel Sennott (born 1995), actor, graduate of Simsbury High School
- Sigourney Weaver (born 1949), actor, attended Ethel Walker School in Simsbury

=== Politicians ===
- Parmenio Adams (1776–1832), former US Congressman
- Levi Barber (1777–1833), U.S. Representative from Ohio
- Lucius Israel Barber (1806–1889), Wisconsin Territory politician
- George McLean (1857–1932), U.S. senator and Simsbury resident who founded the 4,200-acre (17 km^{2}) McLean Game Refuge in town
- Alice Merritt (1876–1950), first woman to serve in the Connecticut State Senate (1925–1929); born in Simsbury
- Elisha Phelps (1779–1847), congressman from Connecticut
- Gifford Pinchot (1865–1946), first Chief of the United States Forest Service (1905–1910), Governor of Pennsylvania (1923–1927, 1931–1935), born in Simsbury

=== Others ===
- James Adams (1783–1843), lawyer and early convert to Mormonism
- David Cordani (born 1966), CEO of Cigna
- Sherri Browning Erwin (1968–present), author and current resident
- Justin Foley (born June 16, 1976, in Simsbury), is an American musician, best known as the drummer of the metalcore band, Killswitch Engage
- Sarah Pratt McLean Greene (1856–1935), novelist, born in Simsbury
- Samuel Higley (1687–1737), reputed to have coined the first copper coins ("Higley coppers") in the colonial United States
- Martin Luther King Jr. (1929–1968), worked on a tobacco plantation in Simsbury during the summers of 1944 and 1947 to earn money for college
- Franz Von Holzhausen, car designer at Tesla, grew up in Simsbury
- Jennifer Weiner (born 1970), author
- Carl Nichols, (born 1970), United States district judge of the United States District Court for the District of Columbia, grew up in Simsbury
- Faith Potter (born 2005), famous for work with Sean Kingston.
- Norman Pinney (1804–1862), teacher, minister and author, born in Simsbury
- Michael Bertolini (1984-present), author

== Sister City ==
- Wittmund, Lower Saxony, Germany

== See also ==
- National Register of Historic Places listings in Hartford County, Connecticut
