= Stratton Brook State Park =

State park in Hartford County, Connecticut

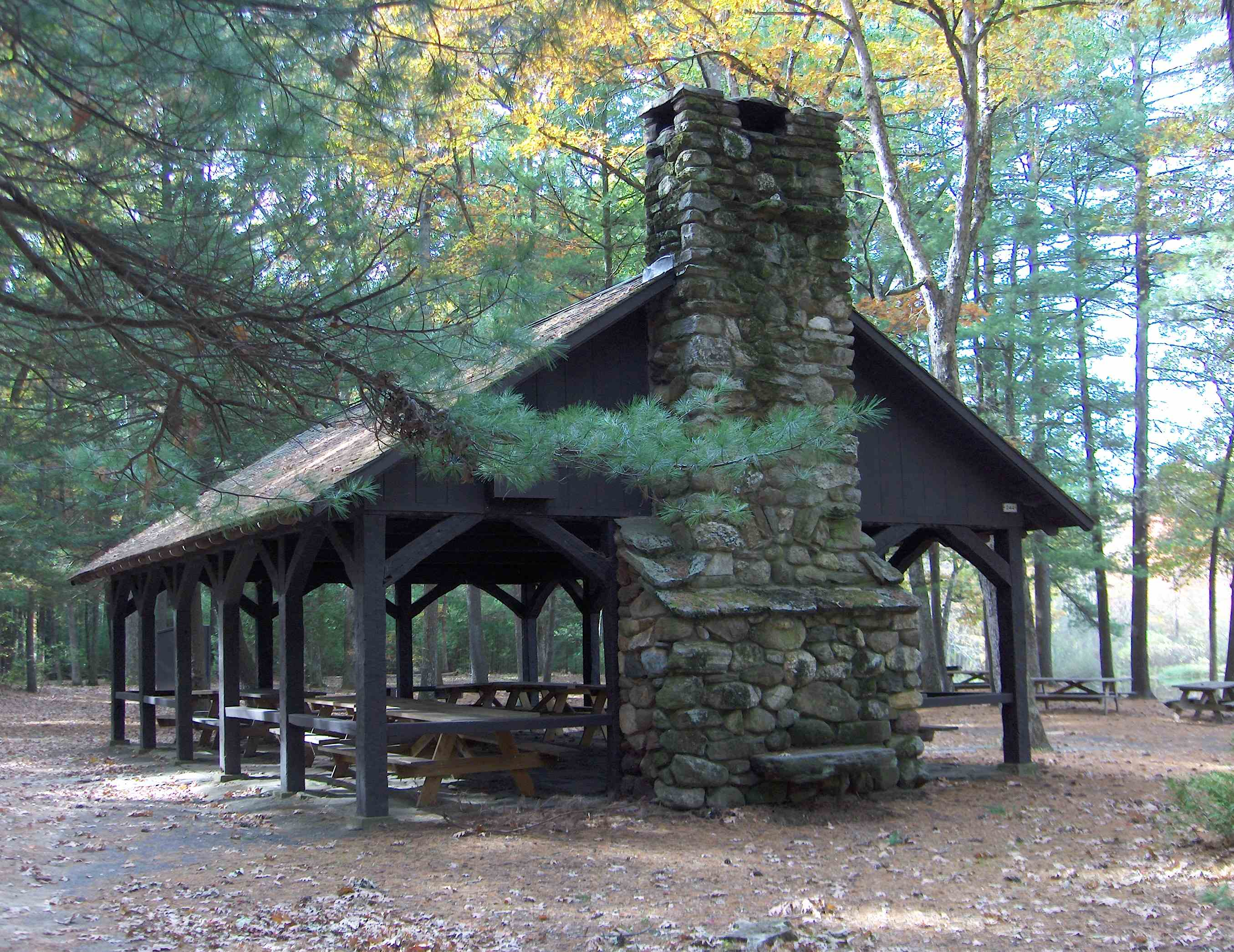
- Pavilion built by the CCC

- Location within Connecticut Location within the United States
- Location: Simsbury, Connecticut, United States
- Coordinates: 41°51′49″N 72°50′07″W
- Area: 145 acres (59 ha)
- Elevation: 236 ft (72 m)
- Established: 1949
- Administrator: Connecticut Department of Energy and Environmental Protection
- Designation: Connecticut state park
- Website: Official website

Stratton Brook State Park is a public recreation area located in the town of Simsbury, Connecticut. Among its notable features is the Massaco Forest Pavilion, built by the Civilian Conservation Corps in 1935. The state park offers picnicking, fishing, swimming, hiking, biking, cross-country skiing, and ice fishing as well as a seasonal nature center.
