= Southwest District School =

Southwest District School may refer to:

- Southwest District School (Bloomfield, Connecticut), listed on the National Register of Historic Places in Hartford County, Connecticut
- Southwest District School (Wolcott, Connecticut), listed on the National Register of Historic Places in New Haven County, Connecticut
