= Naomi Cohen =

American politician

Member of the Connecticut House of Representatives from the 15th district
- In office 1983–1993
- Preceded by: John T. Pier
- Succeeded by: Mary Eberle

Personal details
- Party: Democratic
- Education: Charter Oak State College

Naomi K. Cohen is an American politician who served in the Connecticut House of Representatives from 1983 to 1993, representing the 15th district as a Democrat. She lived in Bloomfield during her tenure. Cohen graduated from Charter Oak State College with a degree in public administration.

== Personal life ==
She is Jewish.
