= Oliver Filley House =

Historic house in Connecticut, United States

Coordinates: 41.8347°N 72.7623°W

- Capt. Oliver Filley House
- U.S. National Register of Historic Places
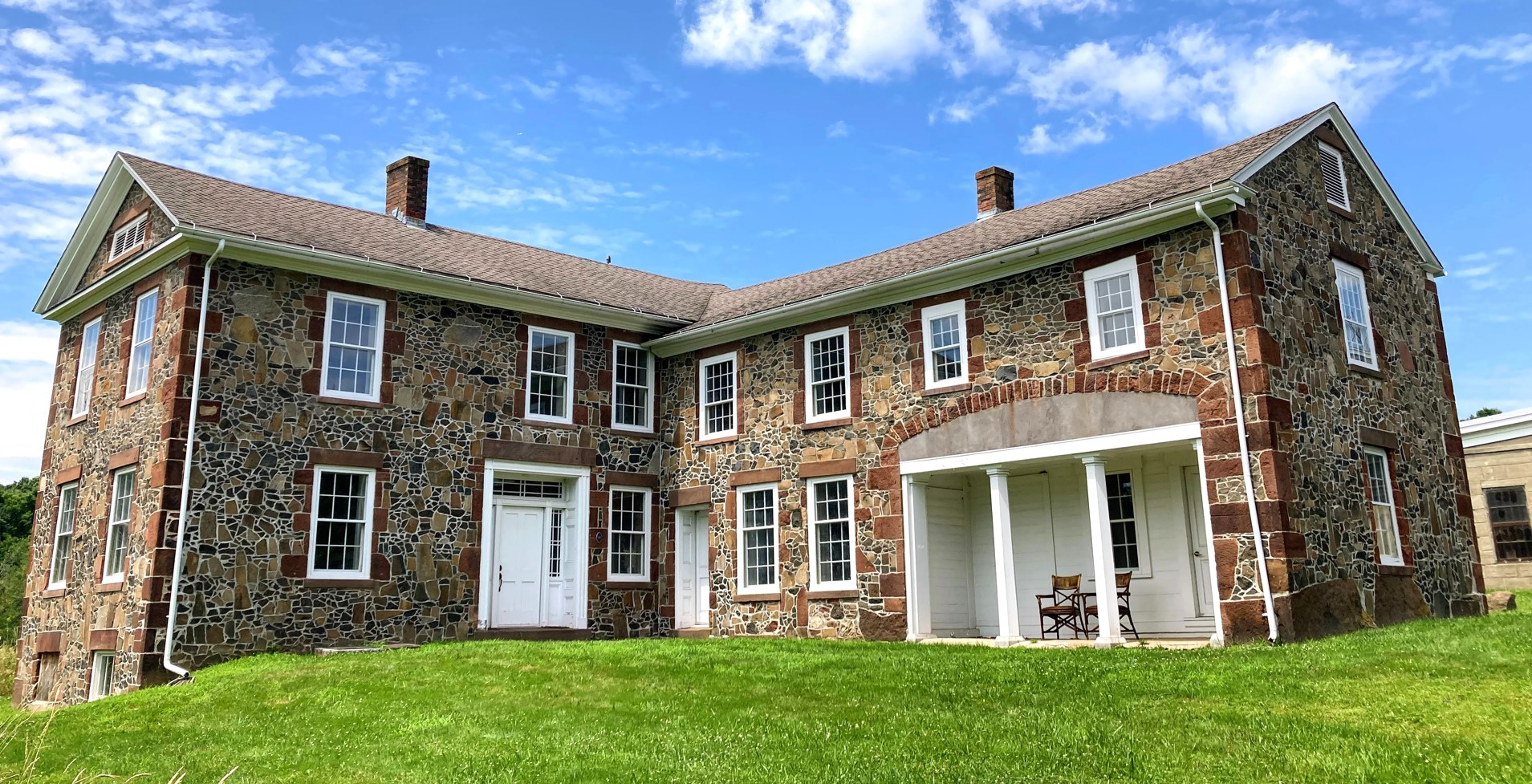
- South profile, 2024

- Location within Connecticut Location within the United States
- Location: Bloomfield, CT
- Nearest city: Hartford
- Area: 144.4 acres (58.4 ha)
- Built: 1834
- Architectural style: Greek Revival
- NRHP reference No.: 07000420
- Added to NRHP: May 15, 2007

The Oliver Filley House is a historic Greek Revival house at 130 Mountain Avenue in Bloomfield, Connecticut, United States. It was occupied by Captain Oliver Filley and his family, a tinsmith who served as a captain in the Connecticut militia during the War of 1812.

== Oliver Filley Senior and Junior ==
Shortly after the end of the Revolutionary War, Oliver Filley Sr. purchased land and a house in Wintonbury. He died at the age of 39 in 1796, leaving a part of the family farm to his 12-year-old son Oliver Jr. Filley received only nine acres (3.6 ha) at the time of his father's death, but would add to his holdings, and eventually built up the farm to include the original holdings. He started a tinsmith business in 1806, a year after marrying Annis Humphrey from nearby Simsbury. His business grew, and he expanded his operations with manufacturing and warehousing in Elizabethtown, New Jersey.

Filley operated out of the New Jersey location, until the War of 1812 forced him to return to Connecticut. The Federalists of New England were not in favor of the war; as a consequence, the Connecticut troops were not placed under federal control. Filley was appointed captain in 1812, and put in charge of forty militiamen, but he did not see any combat as the British did not reach this far north.

== The House ==
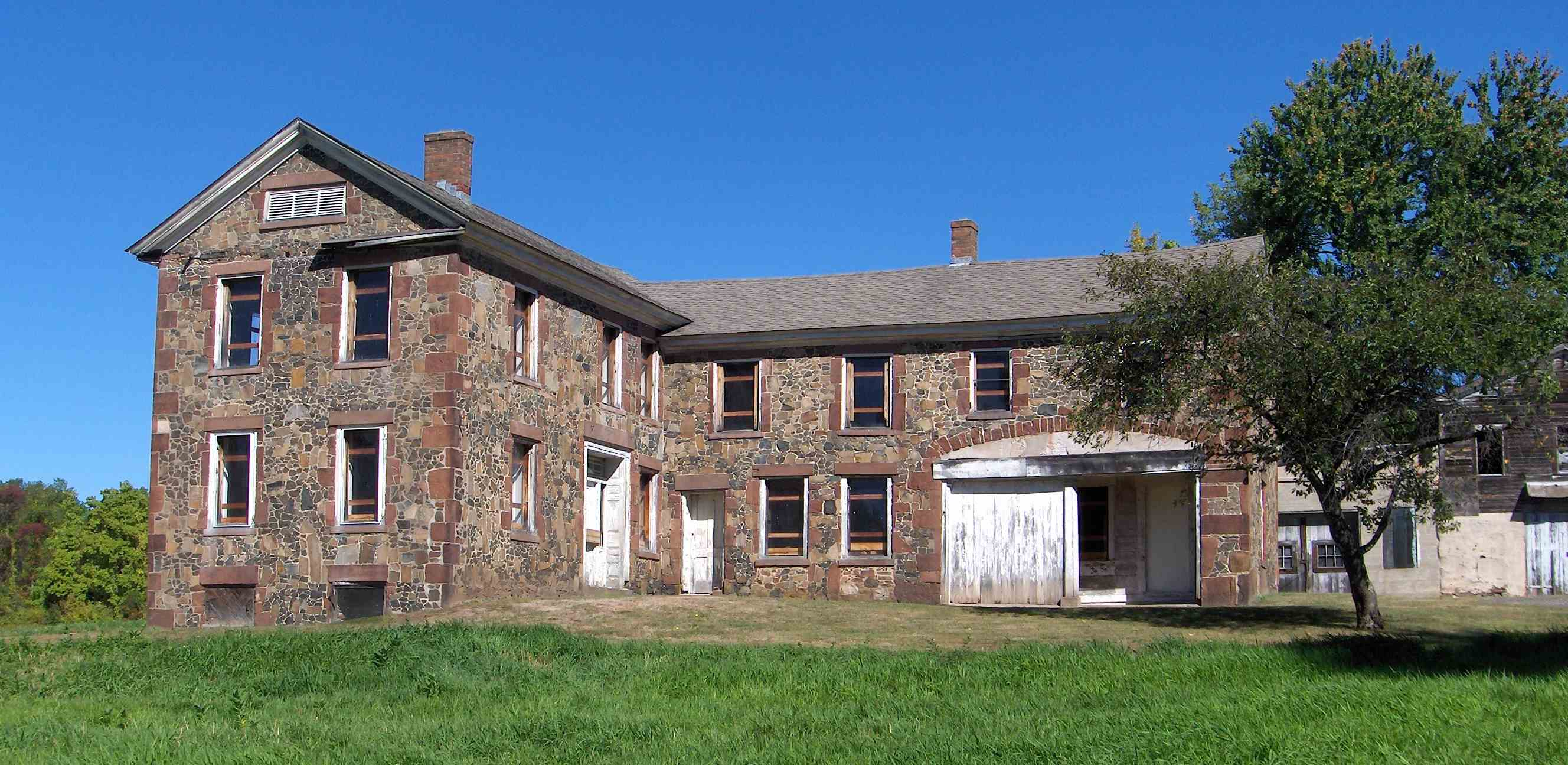
South profile as it looked in 2010

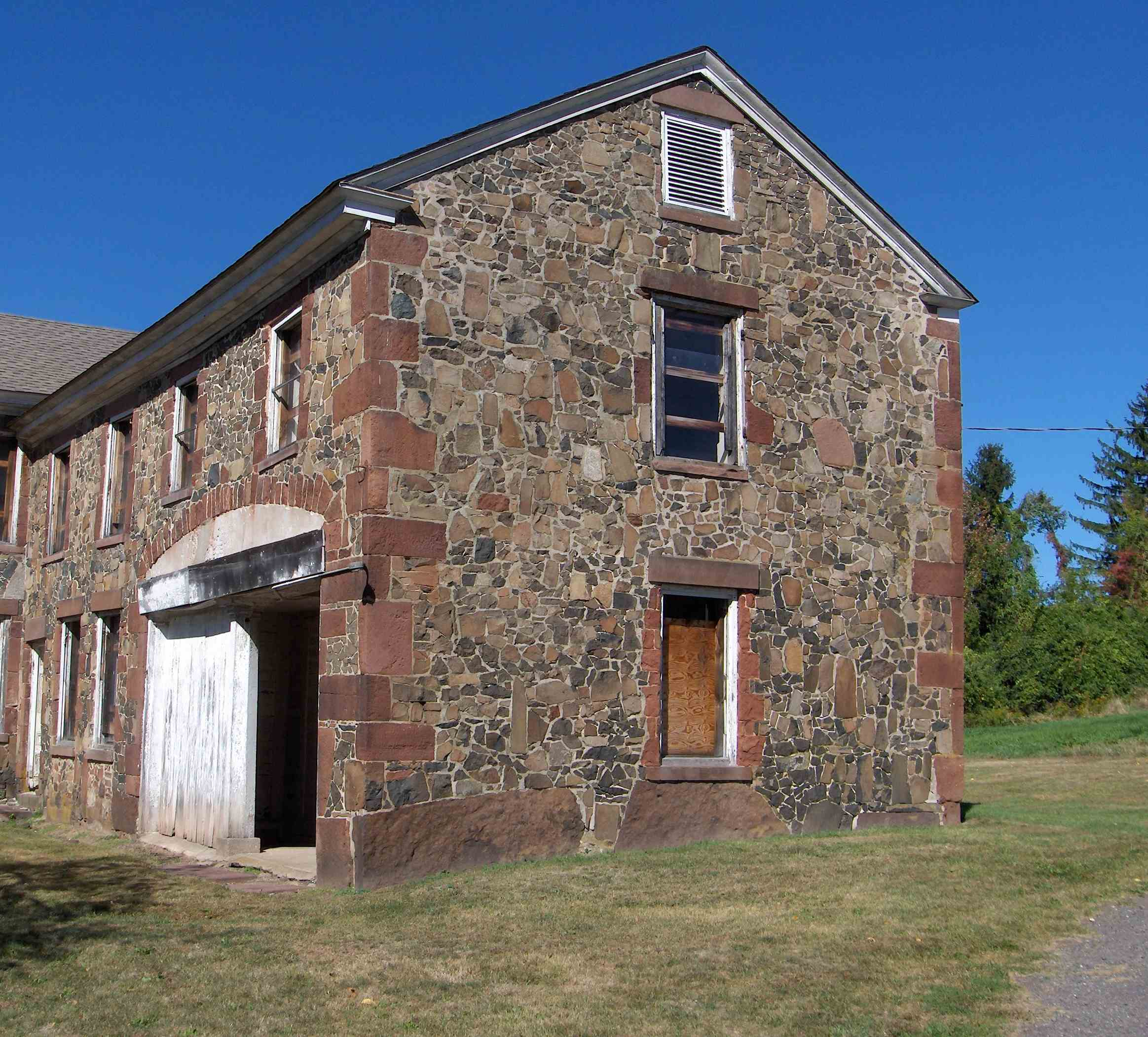
East wing of house in 2010

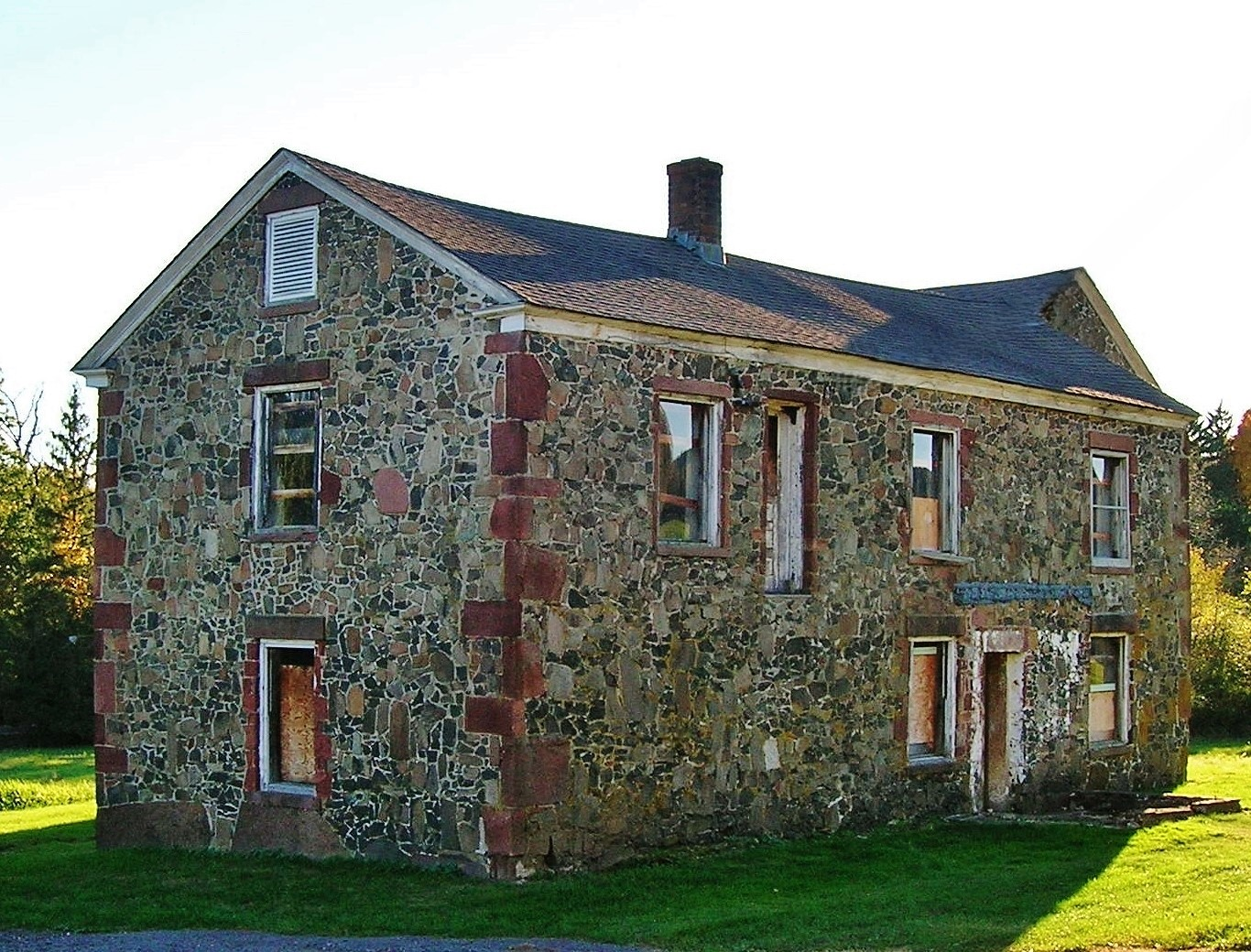
Northeast corner of house in 2010

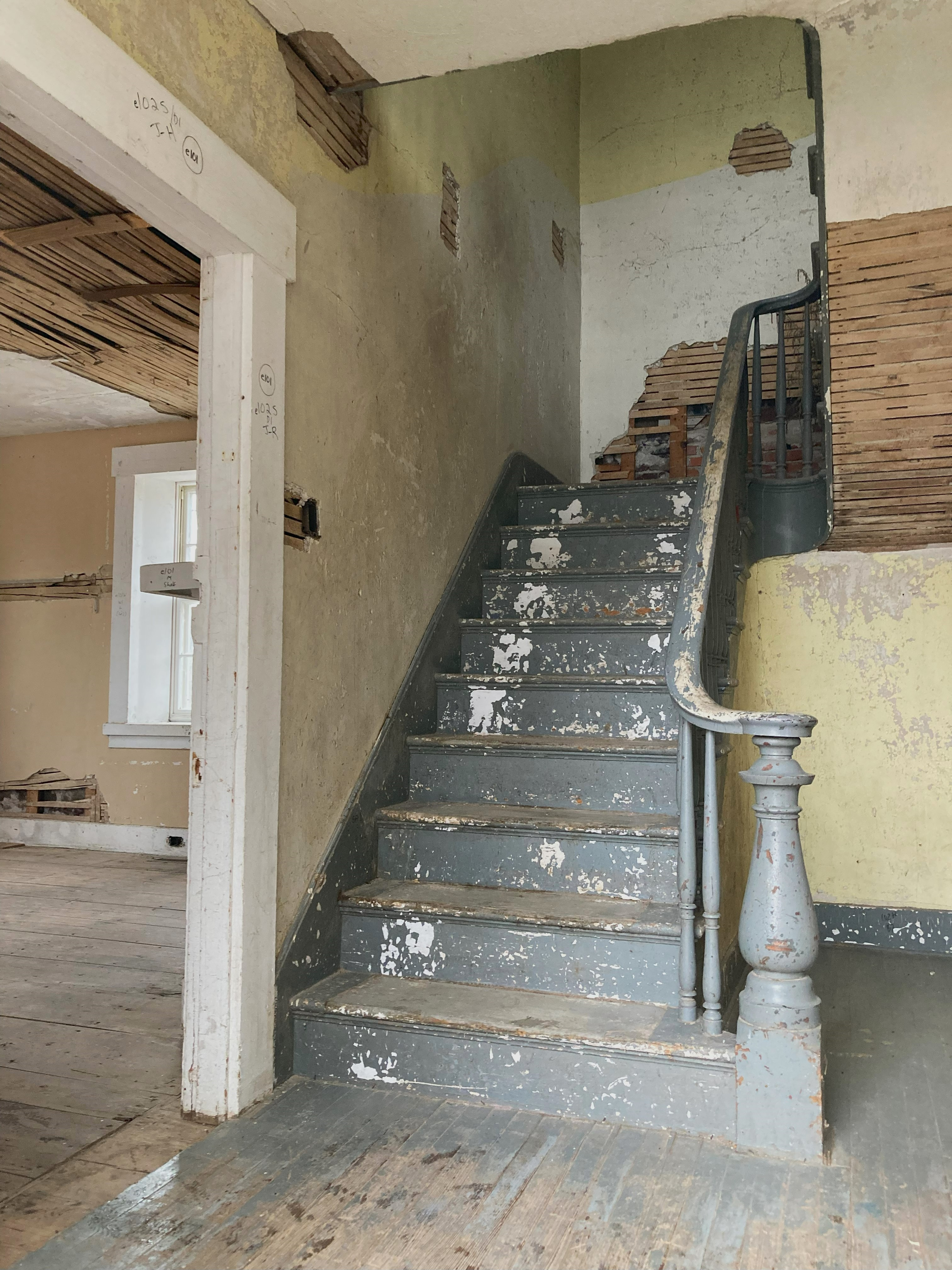
Interior stairway 2024

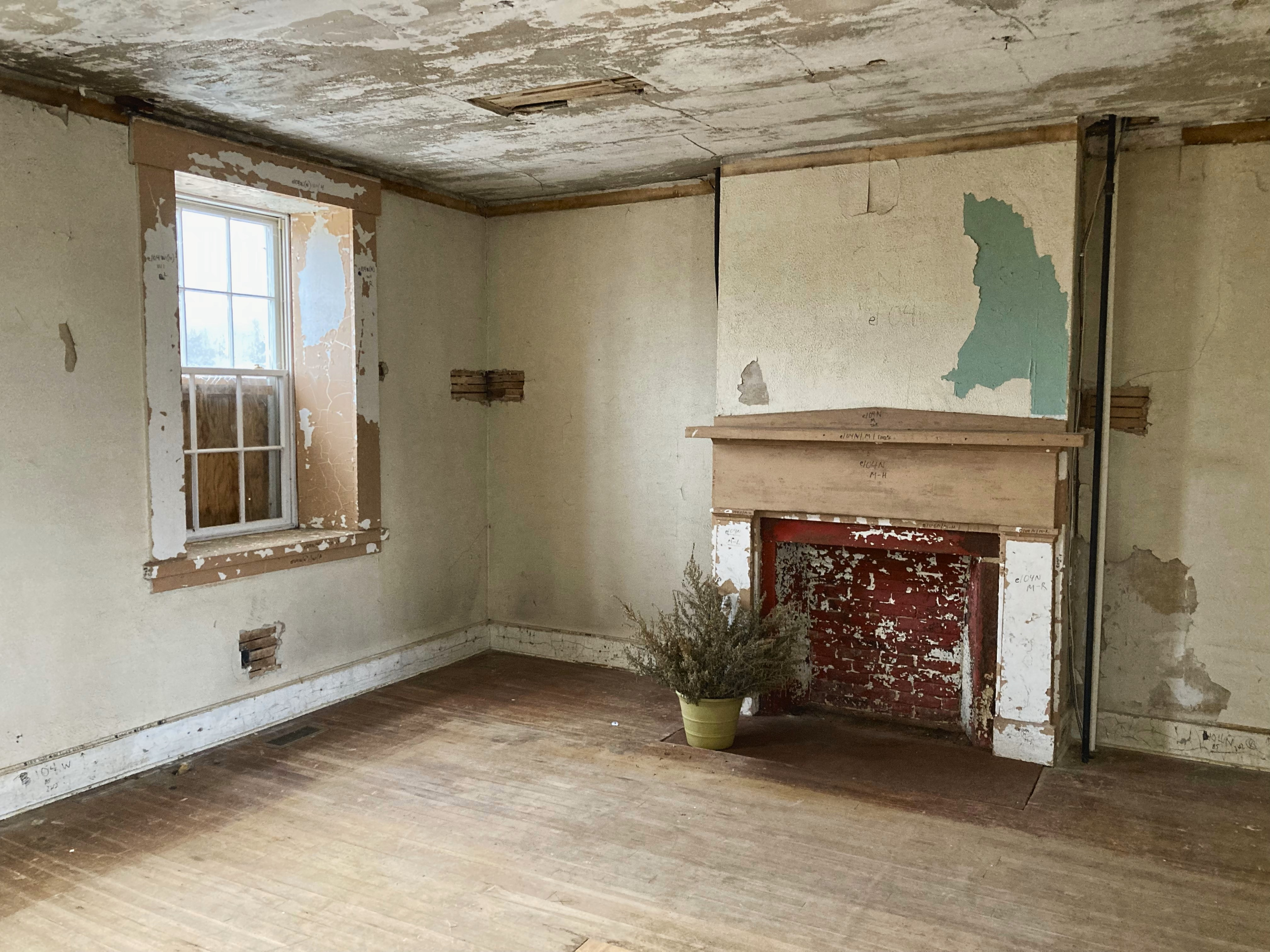
Room with fireplace 2024

Filley built the house for his son Jay in 1834. It is a stone building, built in a Greek Revival style. The walls are made of rubblestone and multi-colored traprock. The floor plan is unusual, consisting of two intersecting wings. The primary living quarters were in the west wing. Filley's decision to build a stone house was partly motivated by the desire of his son, but he was also aware that a stone house was becoming a status symbol in the area. It would become the third stone house in Bloomfield, following a house built two year earlier by David Grant, and one built a year earlier by Francis Gillette.

The house, which was added to the National Historic Register because of the work of Sharon Yusba Steinberg, is now owned by the town of Bloomfield, which is planning a restoration project.

== See also ==
- National Register of Historic Places listings in Hartford County, Connecticut
