= Connecticut's 15th House of Representatives district =

American legislative district

Connecticut's 15th State House of Representatives district
Representative
Bobby Gibson; D

Connecticut's 15th House of Representatives district elects one member of the Connecticut House of Representatives. Its current representative is Bobby Gibson. The district consists of part of the towns of Bloomfield and Windsor.

== List of representatives ==
List of representatives from Connecticut's 15th State House district
Representative	Party	Years	District home	Note
Richard Torpey	Democratic	1967–1969	East Hartford	Seat created
Richard C. Willard	Democratic	1969–1973	East Hartford	
Victor Tudan	Democratic	1973–1975	Windsor	Did not seek reelection
Raymond C. Ferrari	Democratic	1975–1979	Bloomfield	Did not seek reelection
John T. Pier	Democratic	1979–1983	Windsor	Did not seek reelection
Naomi Cohen	Democratic	1983–1993	Bloomfield	Did not seek reelection
Mary Eberle	Democratic	1993–2003	Bloomfield	Did not seek reelection
Faith McMahon	Democratic	2003–2009	Bloomfield	Died in office
David Baram	Democratic	2009–2017	Bloomfield	Resigned after being elected 3rd District Probate Court judge
Bobby Gibson	Democratic	2017–present	Bloomfield	

== Recent elections ==
State Election 2010: House District 15
Party	Candidate	Votes	%	±%
Democratic	David Baram	7,270	72.3	−5.3
Republican	Aaron Jubrey	2,378	23.6	+1.2
Working Families	David Baram	414	4.1	+4.1
Majority		5,306	52.7	+2.5
Turnout		10,062		
Democratic hold		Swing	-1.2	

Democratic Primary, August 10, 2010: House District 15
Party	Candidate	Votes	%	±%
Democratic	David Baram	1,866	59.7	
Democratic	Leo Canty	929	29.7	
Democratic	James Michel	333	10.6	
Majority		937	30.0	
Turnout		3,128		

Special election, March 23, 2009: House District 15
Party	Candidate	Votes	%	±%
Democratic	David Baram	1,513	55.7	−21.9
Republican	Joseph Merritt	1,038	38.2	+15.8
Independent	Devaughn Ward	165	6.1	+6.1
Majority		475	17.5	−37.7
Turnout		2,716		
Democratic hold		Swing	-18.9	

State Election 2008: House District 15
Party	Candidate	Votes	%	±%
Democratic	Faith McMahon	9,765	77.6	−17.9
Republican	Aaron Jubrey	2,817	22.4	+22.4
Majority		6,948	55.2	−34.9
Turnout		12,582		
Democratic hold		Swing	-20.1	

State Election 2006: House District 15
Party	Candidate	Votes	%	±%
Democratic	Faith McMahon	6,882	95.5	+20.1
Working Families	Mark Bain	321	4.5	+4.5
Majority		6,561	91.1	+40.2
Turnout		7,203		
Democratic hold		Swing	+15.6	

State Election 2004: House District 15
Party	Candidate	Votes	%	±%
Democratic	Faith McMahon	8,343	75.4	+4.3
Republican	Ronald C. Eleveld	2,717	24.6	−4.3
Majority		5,626	50.9	+8.8
Turnout		11,060		
Democratic hold		Swing	+4.3	

State Election 2002: House District 15
Party	Candidate	Votes	%	±%
Democratic	Faith McMahon	5,843	71.1	−28.9
Republican	Ronald C. Eleveld	2,380	28.9	+28.9
Majority		3,463	42.1	−57.9
Turnout		8,223		
Democratic hold		Swing	-28.9	

State Election 2000: House District 15
Party	Candidate	Votes	%	±%
Democratic	Mary U. Eberle	7,575	100.0	
Majority		7,575	100.0	+0.0
Turnout		7,575		
Democratic hold		Swing	+0.0	

State Election 1998: House District 15
Party	Candidate	Votes	%	±%
Democratic	Mary U. Eberle	5,535	100.0	+0.0
Majority		5,535	100.0	+0.0
Turnout		5,535		
Democratic hold		Swing	+0.0	

State Election 1996: House District 15
Party	Candidate	Votes	%	±%
Democratic	Mary U. Eberle	7,260	100.0	+55.7
Majority		7,260	100.0	+60.9
Turnout		7,260		
Democratic hold		Swing	+55.7	

State Election 1994: House District 15
Party	Candidate	Votes	%	±%
Democratic	Mary U. Eberle	3,734	44.3	−5.1
Republican	Roy Duncan	2,568	30.4	−10.0
A Connecticut Party (1990)	Mary U. Eberle	2,133	25.3	+15.0
Majority		3,299	39.1	+30.1
Turnout		8,435		
Democratic hold		Swing	-10.0	

State Election 1992: House District 15
Party	Candidate	Votes	%	±%
Democratic	Mary U. Eberle	5,187	49.4	−50.6
Republican	Joseph P. Merritt	4,241	40.4	+40.4
A Connecticut Party (1990)	Franklin Johnson	1,079	10.3	+10.3
Majority		946	9.0	−91.0
Turnout		10,507		
Democratic hold		Swing	-50.6	

State Election 1990: House District 15
Party	Candidate	Votes	%	±%
Democratic	Naomi K. Cohen	5,996	100.0	+0.0
Majority		5,996	100.0	+0.0
Turnout		5,996		
Democratic hold		Swing	+0.0	

State Election 1988: House District 15
Party	Candidate	Votes	%	±%
Democratic	Naomi K. Cohen	7,754	100.0	+0.0
Majority		7,754	100.0	+0.0
Turnout		7,754		
Democratic hold		Swing	+0.0	

State Election 1986: House District 15
Party	Candidate	Votes	%	±%
Democratic	Naomi K. Cohen	5,686	100.0	+55.7
Majority		5,686	100.0	
Turnout		5,686		
Democratic hold		Swing		

State Election 1984: House District 15
Party	Candidate	Votes	%	±%
Democratic	Naomi K. Cohen	6,726	64.6	−1.8
Republican	Peter W. Rogan	3,685	35.4	+1.8
Majority		3,041	29.2	−3.7
Turnout		10,411		
Democratic hold		Swing	-1.8	

State Election 1982: House District 15
Party	Candidate	Votes	%	±%
Democratic	Naomi K. Cohen	5,474	66.4	+0.7
Republican	Peter W. Rogan	2,765	33.6	−0.7
Majority		2,709	32.9	+1.4
Turnout		8,239		
Democratic hold		Swing	+0.7	

State Election 1980: House District 15
Party	Candidate	Votes	%	±%
Democratic	John T. Pier	6,117	65.7	−1.1
Republican	Alice B. Finstad	3,187	34.3	+1.1
Majority		2,930	31.5	
Turnout		9,304		
Democratic hold		Swing	-1.1	

State Election 1978: House District 15
Party	Candidate	Votes	%	±%
Democratic	John T. Pier	4,982	66.8	+4.4
Republican	Edward A. Brown	2,476	33.2	−4.4
Majority		2,506	33.6	+8.8
Turnout		7,458		
Democratic hold		Swing	+4.4	

State Election 1976: House District 15
Party	Candidate	Votes	%	±%
Democratic	Raymond C. Ferrari	6,148	62.4	−4.1
Republican	Edward A. Brown	3,706	37.6	+4.1
Majority		2,442	24.8	−8.2
Turnout		9,854		
Democratic hold		Swing	-4.1	

State Election 1974: House District 15
Party	Candidate	Votes	%	±%
Democratic	Raymond C. Ferrari	5,619	66.5	+3.8
Republican	Elizabeth R. Kaplan	2,831	33.5	−3.8
Majority		2,788	33.0	+7.6
Turnout		8,450		
Democratic hold		Swing	+3.8	

State Election 1972: House District 15
Party	Candidate	Votes	%	±%
Democratic	Victor Tudan	6,371	62.7	
Republican	Merriam Davis	3,793	37.3	
Majority		2,578	25.4	
Turnout		10,164		
Democratic hold		Swing		
