= Faith McMahon =

American politician

Member of the Connecticut House of Representatives from the 15th district
- In office January 8, 2003 – January 27, 2009
- Preceded by: Mary Eberle
- Succeeded by: David Baram

Personal details
- Born: April 11, 1943 Bloomfield, Connecticut, U.S.
- Died: January 27, 2009 (aged 65) Hartford, Connecticut, U.S.
- Party: Democratic

Faith McMahon (April 11, 1943 – January 27, 2009) was an American politician who served in the Connecticut House of Representatives from the 15th district from 2003 until her death in 2009.

She died of cancer on January 27, 2009, in Hartford, Connecticut at age 65.
