= Mary Eberle =

American politician (born 1949)

Member of the Connecticut House of Representatives from the 15th district
- In office 1993–2003
- Preceded by: Naomi Cohen
- Succeeded by: Faith McMahon

Personal details
- Born: June 6, 1949 (age 77)
- Party: Democratic

Mary U. Eberle (born June 6, 1949) is an American politician who served in the Connecticut House of Representatives from 1993 to 2003, representing the 15th district as a Democrat.

== Career ==
Eberle first became involved in Connecticut politics in 1985, when she was elected to Bloomfield's Board of Education.

Eberle was elected to the Connecticut House of Representatives in 1992 and served five terms representing the 15th district. She was endorsed by A Connecticut Party. Eberle did not run for reelection in 2002 and was succeeded by Faith McMahon.
