= David Baram =

American politician

Member of the Connecticut House of Representatives from the 15th district
- In office March 25, 2009 – November 2017
- Preceded by: Faith McMahon
- Succeeded by: Bobby Gibson

Personal details
- Born: February 17, 1953 (age 73)
- Party: Democratic

David Baram (born February 17, 1953) is an American politician who served in the Connecticut House of Representatives from the 15th district from 2009 to 2017.

== Personal life ==
He is Jewish.
