= Old Farm Schoolhouse =

- U.S. National Register of Historic Places
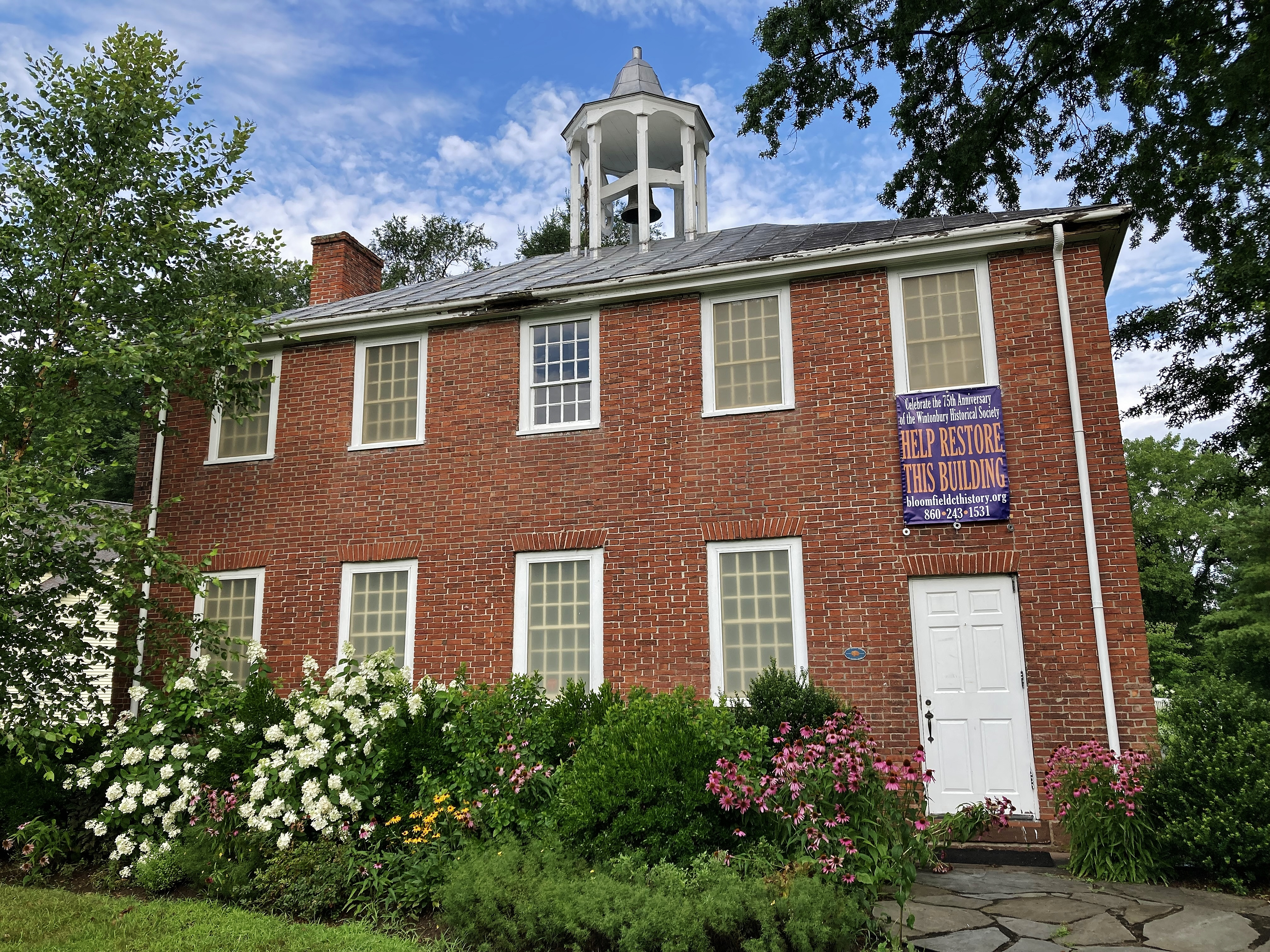

- Location within Connecticut Location within the United States
- Location: Junction of Park Avenue and School Street, Bloomfield, Connecticut
- Coordinates: 41°49′25″N 72°42′32″W
- Area: less than one acre
- Built: 1795
- NRHP reference No.: 72001340
- Added to NRHP: October 18, 1972

The Old Farm Schoolhouse, also known as the Brick School, is a historic schoolhouse at Park Avenue and School Street in Bloomfield, Connecticut. Built in 1795, it is the oldest surviving public building in Bloomfield. It was listed on the National Register of Historic Places in 1972.

== Description and history ==
The Old Farm Schoolhouse is located in southeastern Bloomfield, at the northwest corner of Park Avenue and School Street. It is a two-story brick structure with a hip roof and an open octagonal belfry topped by a cupola. Its main facade is five bays wide, with the main entrance in the rightmost bay. The upper floor windows butt against the plain eave, while those on the first floor are topped by headers made of soldier bricks set at an angle.

The school was one of seven district schools built in what was at the time called Wintonbury Parish in the late 18th century. Its second story was not finished until 1829, when the student population was divided by age. Access to that floor was at first via an outside staircase, which was replaced by the present indoor one in 1843. The building was used as a school until 1922, and was used as a community center for a time thereafter. From 1931 to 1971 it housed a local chapter of the American Legion. It is now a museum property owned by the local historical society. It was moved a short distance by the society in 1976 to allow for a realignment of the street intersection.

== Photo gallery ==
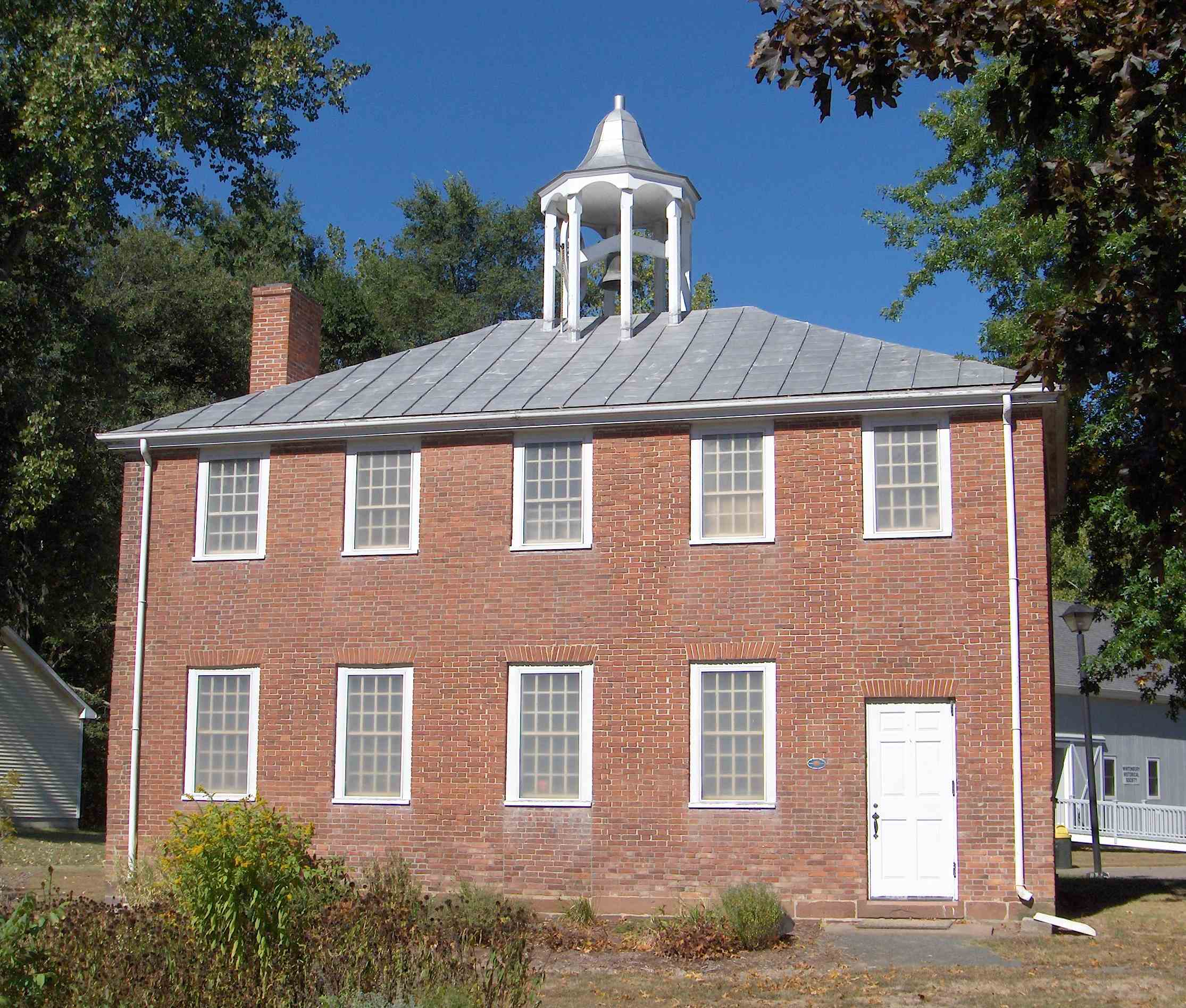
Exterior in 2010, prior to plantings

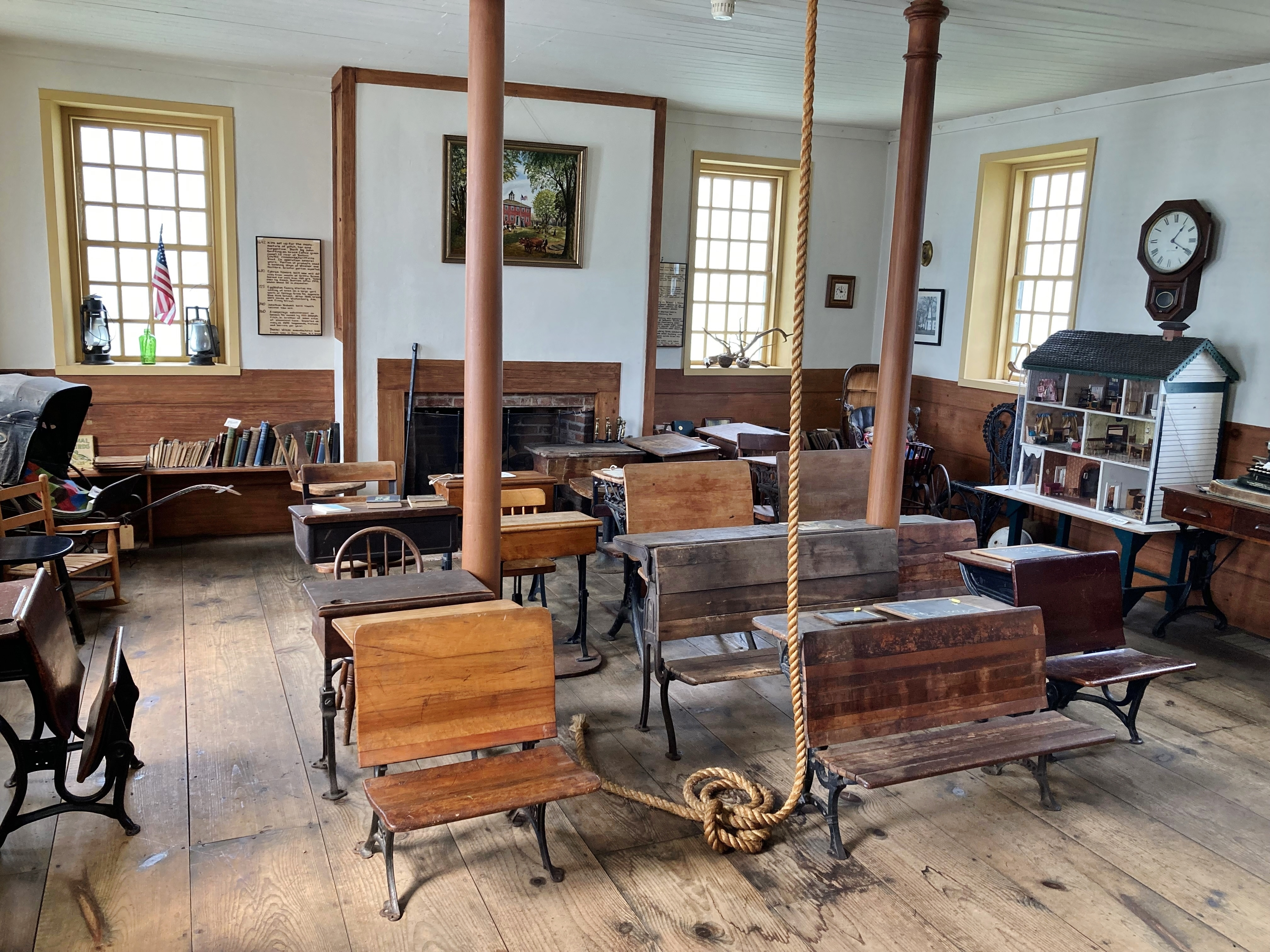
First floor classroom (note the rope for the school bell)

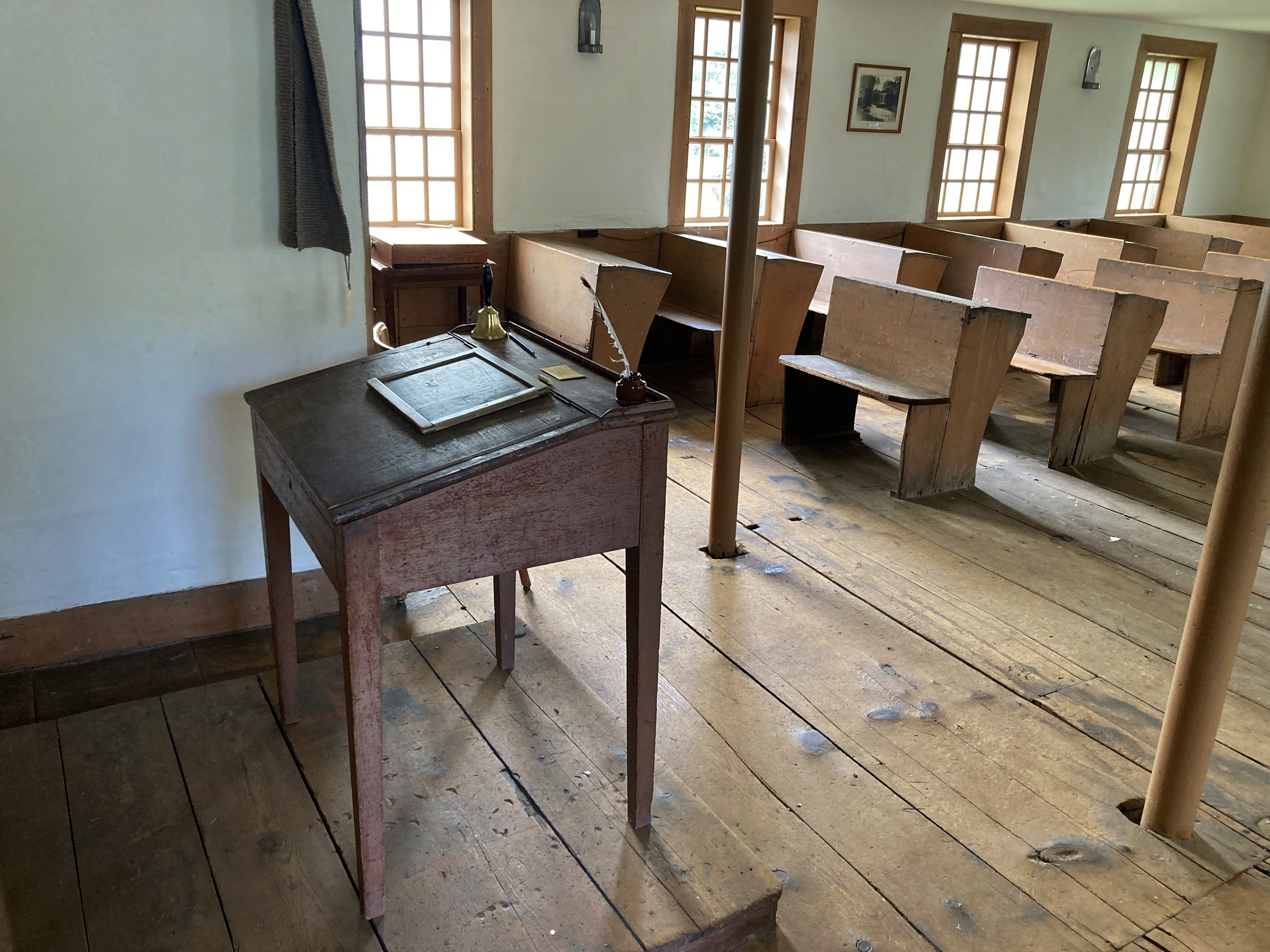
Second floor classroom

== See also ==
- National Register of Historic Places listings in Hartford County, Connecticut
