= Bobby Gibson =

Connecticut politician

Member of the Connecticut House of Representatives from the 15th district
- Incumbent
- Assumed office January 12, 2018
- Preceded by: David Baram

Personal details
- Born: 1966 (age 59–60) Bloomfield, Connecticut, U.S.
- Party: Democratic
- Education: Charter Oak State College (BA); The Graduate Institute (MA)

Bobby Gibson (born 1966) is an American politician and educator serving as a member of the Connecticut House of Representatives from the 15th district. He assumed office on January 12, 2018.

== Early life and education ==
Gibson was born in Bloomfield, Connecticut. After attending Southern Connecticut State University, he earned a Bachelor of Arts degree from Charter Oak State College. He later earned a Master of Arts from the Graduate Institute in Bethany, Connecticut.

== Career ==
For over 15 years, Gibson has worked as a teacher and football coach for Bloomfield Public Schools and Hartford Public Schools. In 2015, he joined the Capitol Region Education Council. Gibson was elected to the Connecticut House of Representatives in a special election and assumed office on January 12, 2018. In the 2021–2022 legislative session, Gibson is the vice chair of the House General Law Committee. He is also an assistant majority leader of the House.
