= Francis Gillette House =

Historic house in Connecticut, United States

- U.S. National Register of Historic Places
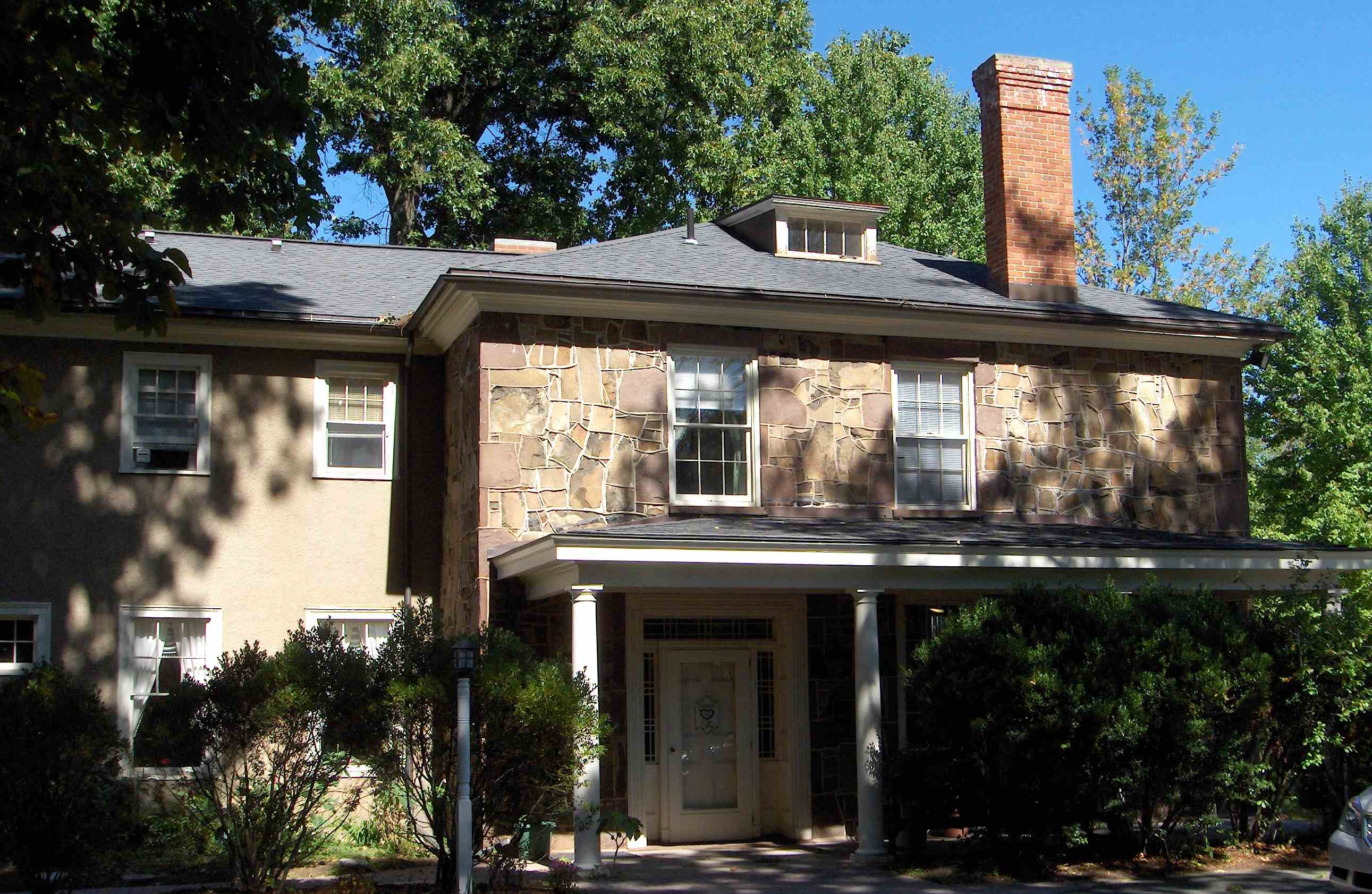

- Location within Connecticut Location within the United States
- Location: 545 Bloomfield Avenue, Bloomfield, Connecticut
- Coordinates: 41°48′51″N 72°44′15″W
- Area: 1 acre (0.40 ha)
- Built: 1833
- NRHP reference No.: 82004391
- Added to NRHP: March 25, 1982

The Francis Gillette House is a historic house at 545 Bloomfield Ave. in Bloomfield, Connecticut. Built in 1833, it is locally unusual as a stone house, but is most significant for its association with Francis Gillette, one of the state's leading abolitionists in the years before the American Civil War. It was listed on the National Register of Historic Places in 1982.

== Description and history ==
The Francis Gillette House is located on the west side of Bloomfield Street, between Cottage Grove Road and Knollwood Drive. Unlike the surrounding 20th-century residential construction, it is set back from the road, and faces to the south. Its main block is roughly cubic and two stories in height, built out of locally quarried fieldstone and covered by a low hip roof. A two-story wood-frame ell extends to the west. Its south-facing facade is three bays wide, with the entrance in the leftmost bay, a window in the second, and a blank space formerly occupied by a brick chimney in the right bay.

The home has some local architectural significance but is mostly significant for its association with abolitionist Francis Gillette. Gillette was prominent in the state as publisher of the Hartford Press, which he founded to counter the Hartford Courant as a vehicle to promote opposition to slavery. There is also some documentation supporting claims that he sheltered runaway slaves at his home. Although this type of Underground Railroad participation is claimed for many homes and is often not credible, here the claim dates from at least 1886 and been accepted by informed scholars.

== See also ==
- National Register of Historic Places listings in Hartford County, Connecticut
- Gillette Castle State Park, the home of Francis Gillette's son, William Gillette
