= Southwest District School (Bloomfield, Connecticut) =

- U.S. National Register of Historic Places
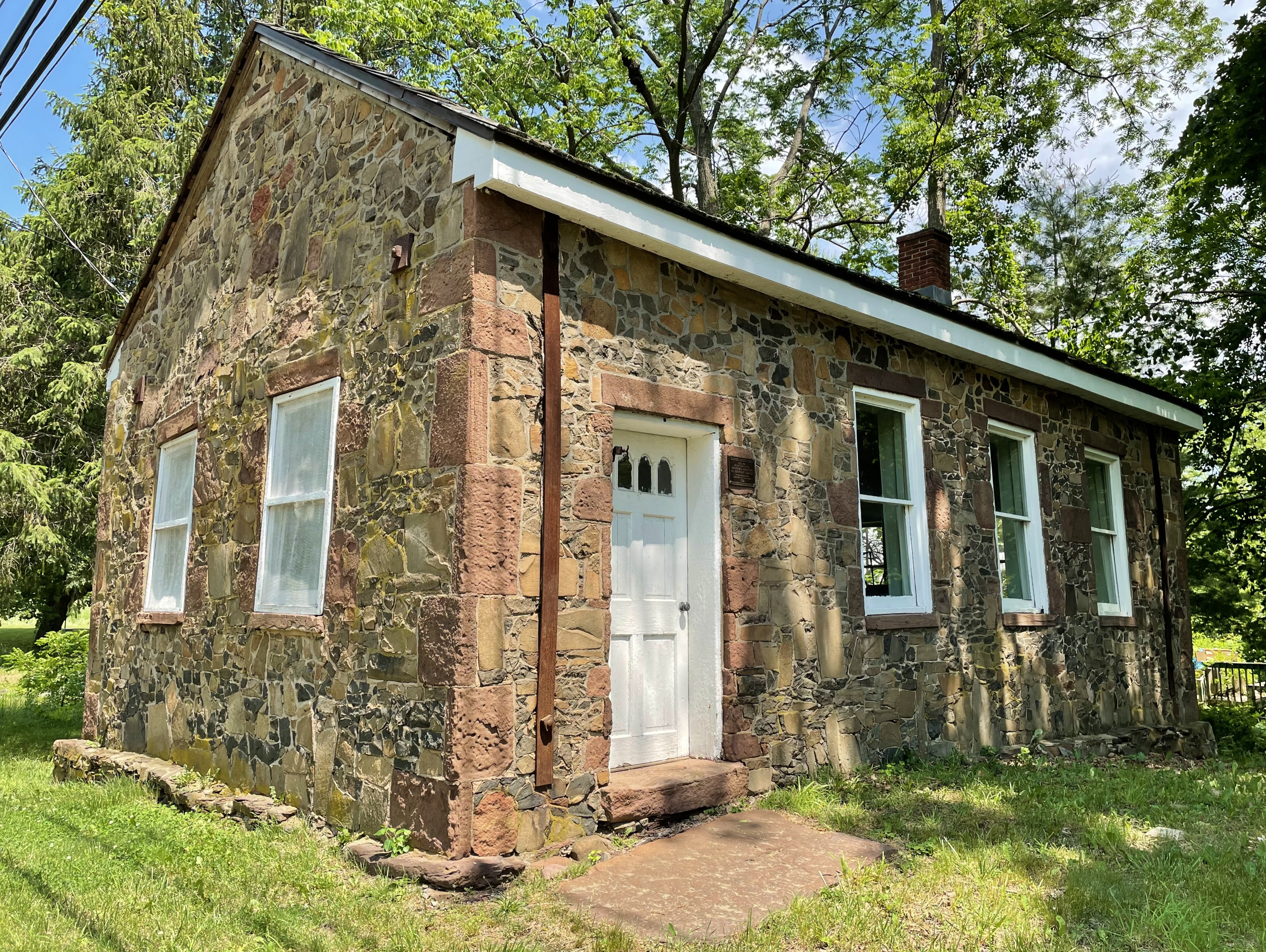

- Location within Connecticut Location within the United States
- Location: 430 Simsbury Road, Bloomfield, Connecticut
- Coordinates: 41°49′4″N 72°46′2″W
- Area: 0.1 acres (0.040 ha)
- Built: 1858
- Built by: Grant, David
- NRHP reference No.: 92000904
- Added to NRHP: July 24, 1992

The Southwest District School is a historic school building at 430 Simsbury Road in Bloomfield, Connecticut. Built in 1858, it is one of the town's few surviving 19th-century district school buildings. It was listed on the National Register of Historic Places in 1992.

== Description and history ==
The Southwest District School is located in a rural-residential area of Southwestern Bloomfield, on the East Side of Simsbury Road (Connecticut Route 185) a short way south of its junction with High Hill Road. It is set close to the road on a very small parcel of land. It is a single-story stone structure, with a gabled roof. The stone appears to be locally quarried rock, cut in random sizes and shapes, with square-cut corner blocks. Windows are set in rectangular openings, with sandstone sills and lintels. The street-facing gable facade has two windows, while the south-facing facade has the entrance at the left end, and three windows to its right. The door opens into a small vestibule, which has had a closet partitioned off the far end, with the balance of the building occupied by the classroom. The vestibule is finished in tongue-and-groove wood boards, while the main chamber is plastered, with wide moulding.

The school was built in 1858 by David Grant, who was listed in local census records as a farmer. The school was built to serve the predominantly rural agricultural families of the area, and remained in operation until 1922 or 1923, when the town closed the last of its district schools. The school's stone construction was fairly typical of rural construction in the area, where a number of farmhouses were also built out of locally quarried materials.

The property is currently owned by the Wintonbury Historical Society.

== Photo gallery ==
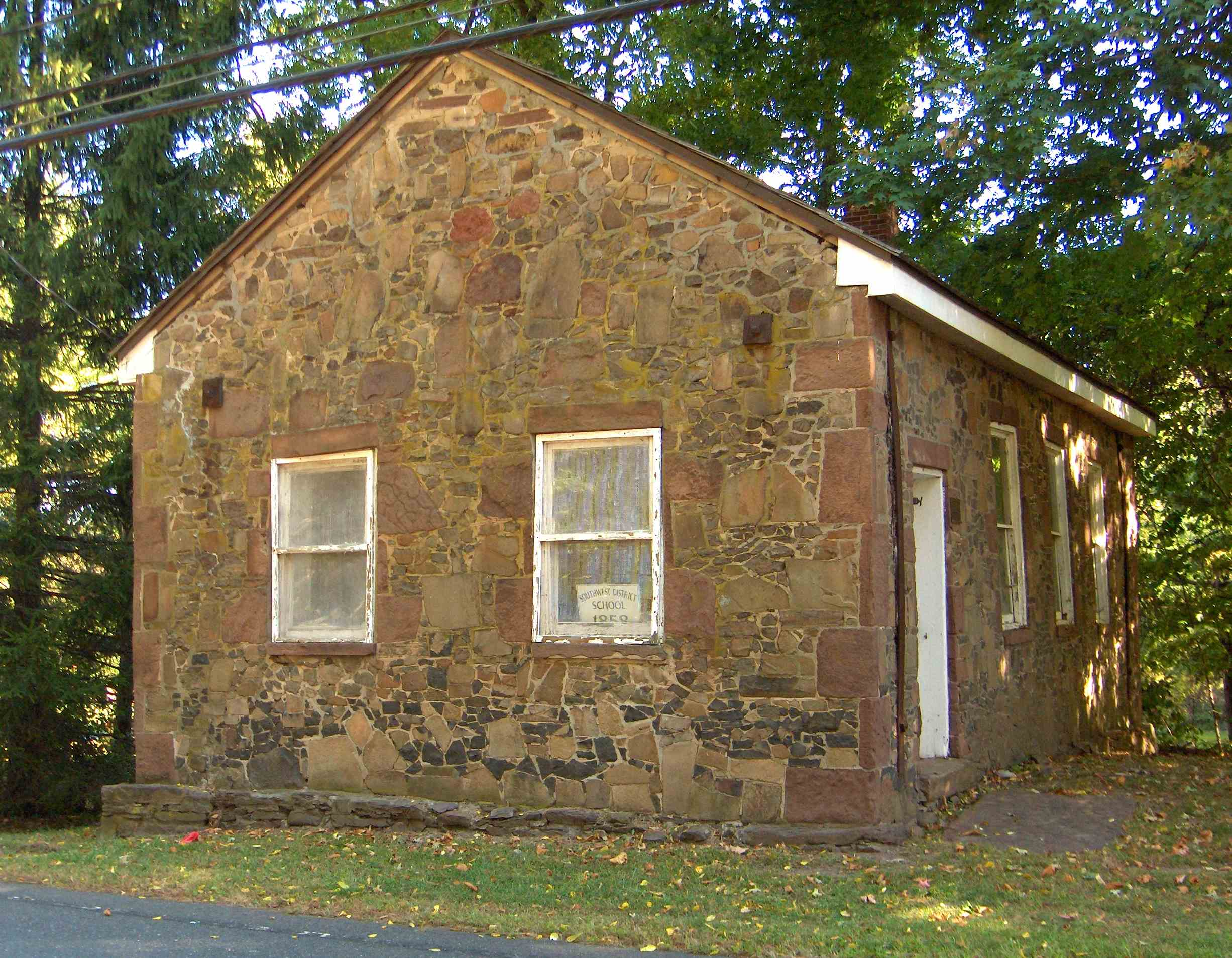
Exterior, side view (2010)

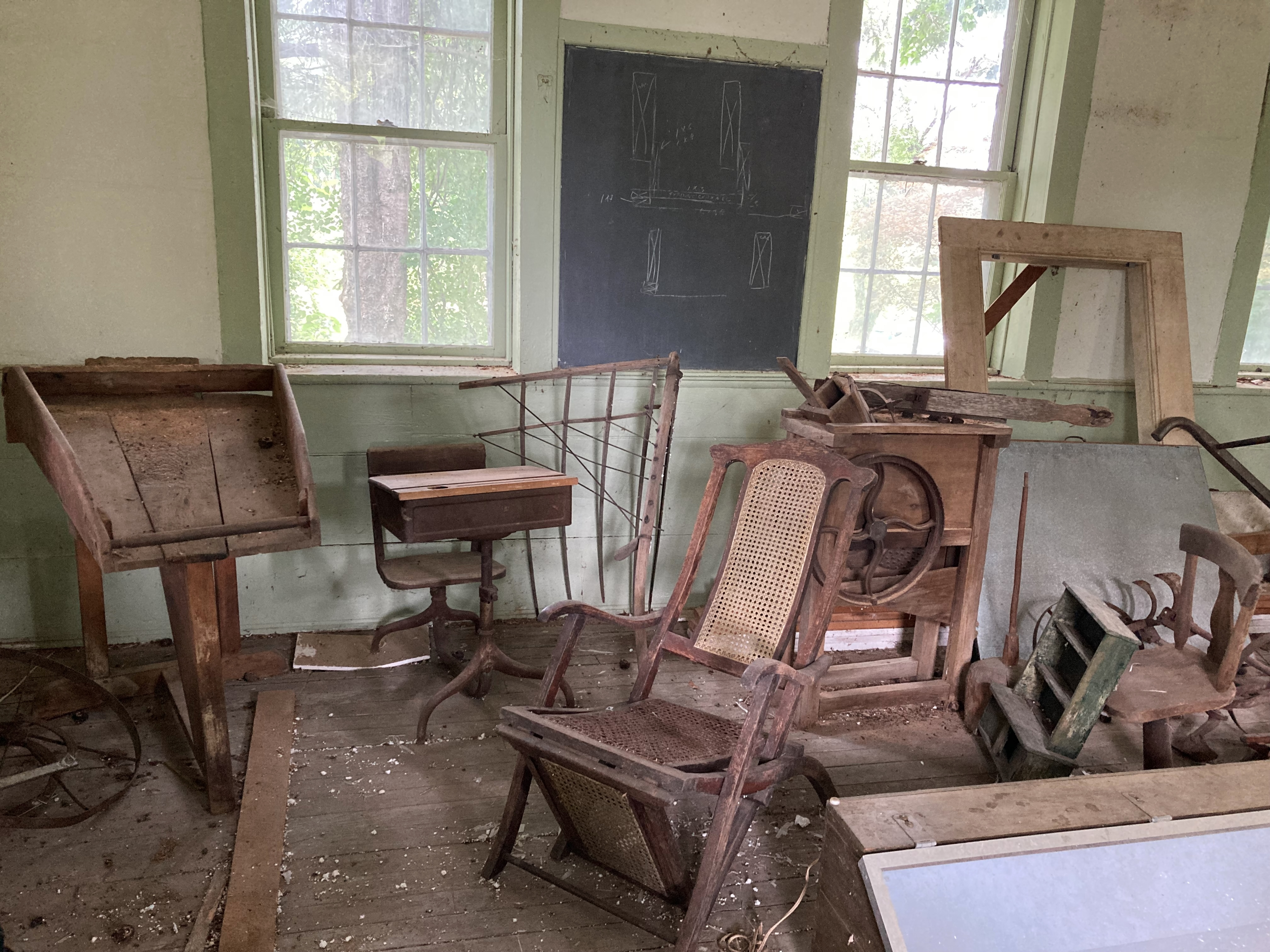
Interior, with blackboard (2024)

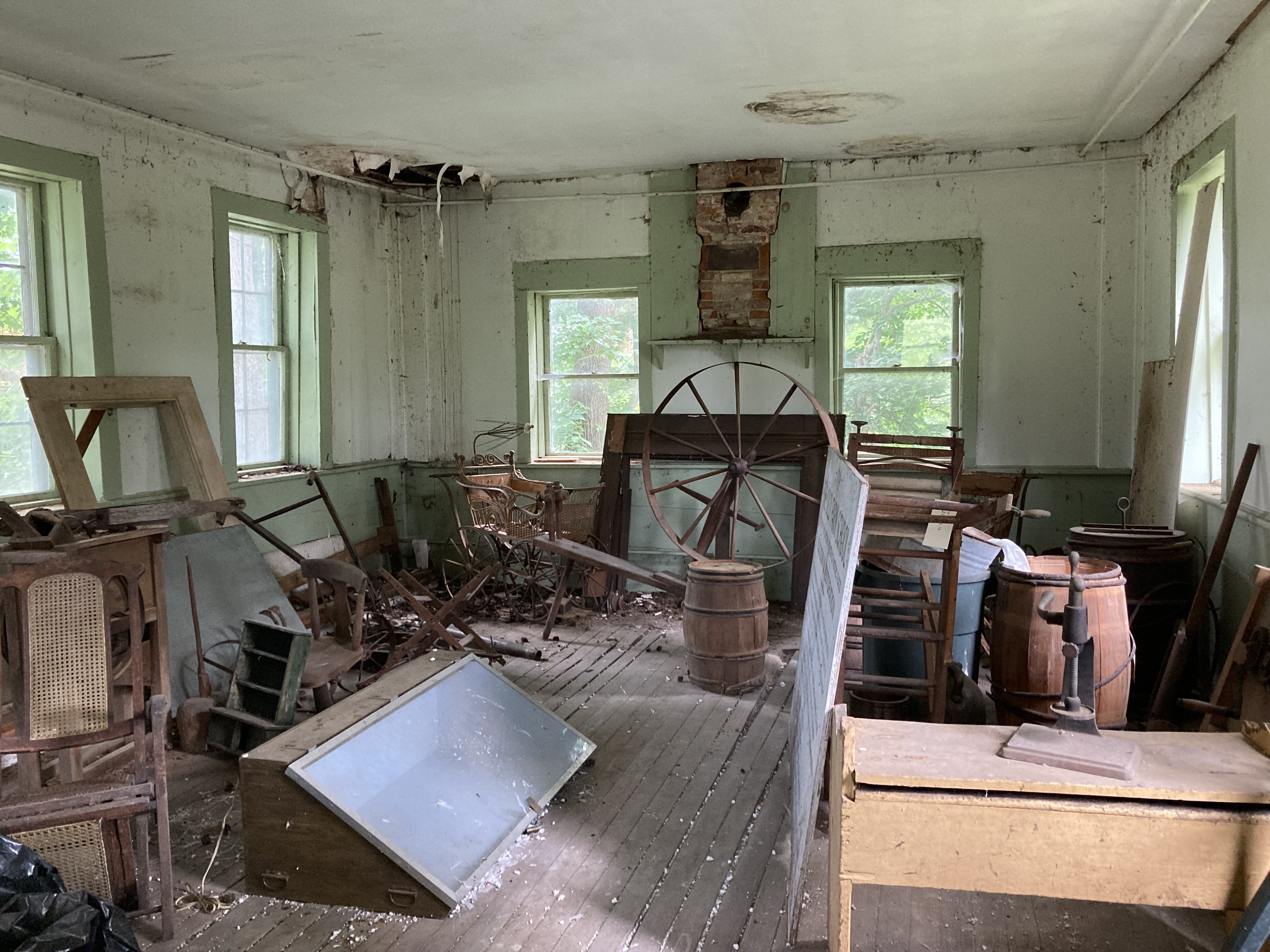
Interior, facing chimney wall (2024)

== See also ==
- National Register of Historic Places listings in Hartford County, Connecticut
