= Southwest District School (Wolcott, Connecticut) =

- U.S. National Register of Historic Places
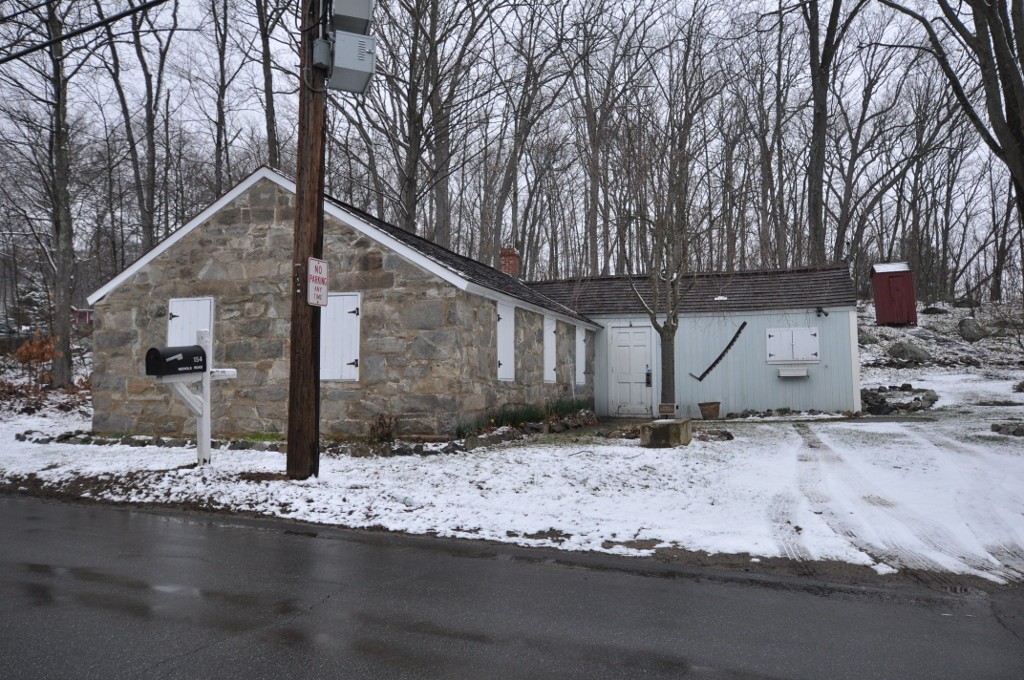

- Location within Connecticut Location within the United States
- Location: 155 Nichols Road, Wolcott, Connecticut, U.S.
- Coordinates: 41°34′49″N 72°59′10″W
- Area: 0.3 acres (0.12 ha)
- Built: 1821
- NRHP reference No.: 82004363
- Added to NRHP: April 2, 1982

The Southwest District School is a historic former district schoolhouse at 155 Nichols Road in Wolcott, Connecticut. Built in the early 1820s, it is the oldest of the town's surviving district schoolhouses, and the only example in the town of a structure built out of locally quarried granite. Now a museum of the local historical society, it was listed on the National Register of Historic Places in 1982.

== Description and history ==
Wolcott's former Southwest District School stands in the southern part of the rural community, on the north side of Nichols Road a short way west of the Woodtick Recreation Area. It is a single-story structure, its main block built of granite and covered by a wooden-frame gabled roof. A wood-frame shed extends from the rear of the right side, giving the building an overall L shape. The main block was actually built in two sections: the older front section is formed out of locally quarried granite with rough untrimmed finish, while the rear section, a later addition, was built using commercially quarried stone. The shed addition acts as an entry vestibule, with the main block of the building taken up by a single large chamber. Its interior is finished in plaster, with a 20th-century concrete floor.

The town of Wolcott was incorporated in 1796 out of Southington, and was divided into six school districts. This school was built after the previous school on this site, a wood-frame structure, burned in 1820. Records of a local family indicate that an ancestor attended the new school in 1821, but the date 1825 is found in the trim of the gable end. Although Wolcott is known for its granite outcrops, this is the only known example of a 19th-century building built entirely out of the material in the town. Its design may have been influenced by Bronson Alcott a Wolcott native who was then teaching in one of the other town schools, and published a treatise on the design of district schools. The school was enlarged in 1898 to meet increased demand, and continued in use as a school until 1930. It was used briefly as an overflow school space in the 1940s. It was acquired in 1963 by the local historical society, which now uses it as a museum space.

== See also ==
- National Register of Historic Places listings in New Haven County, Connecticut
