= Bloomfield, Connecticut =

- Town
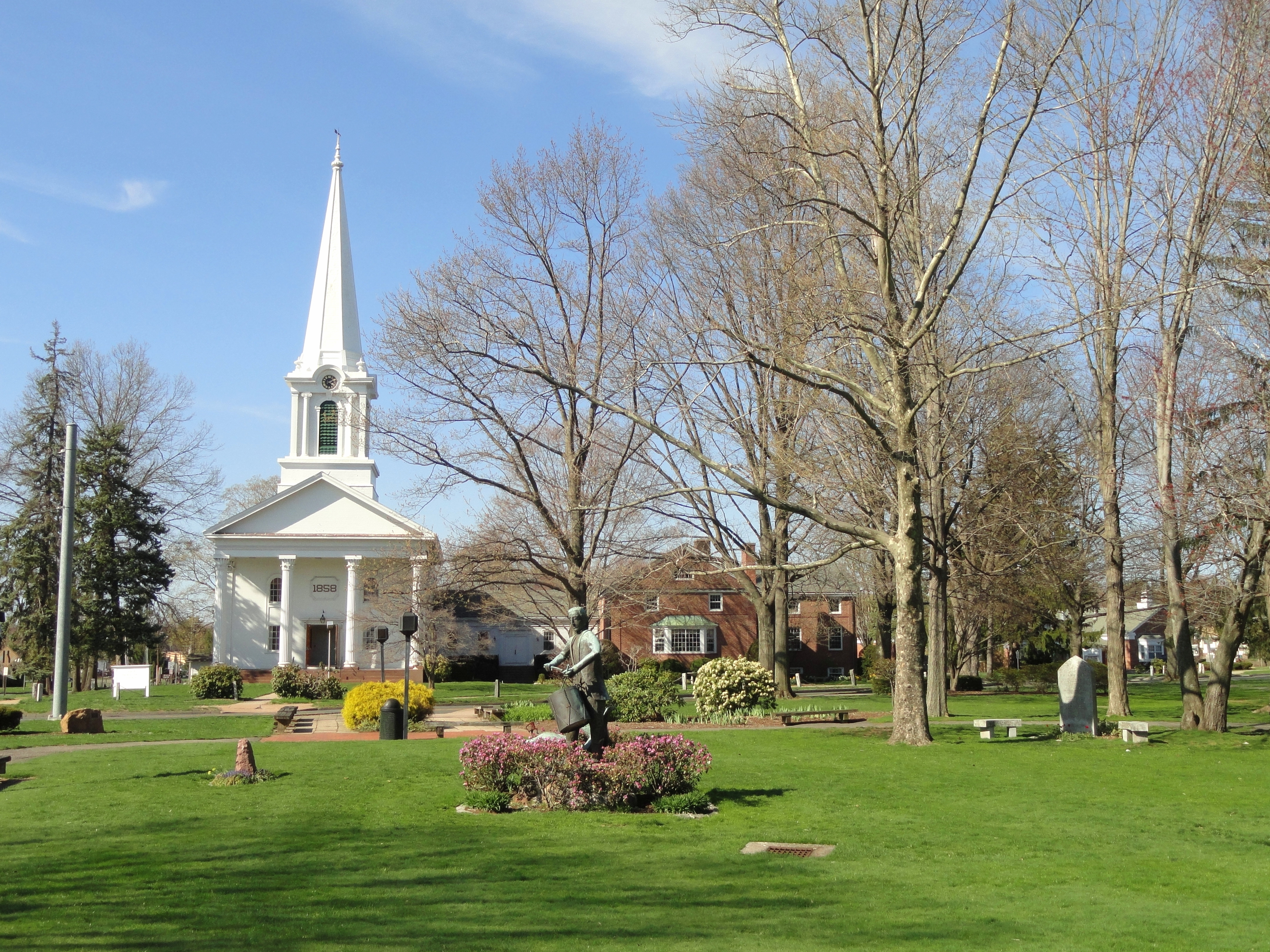
- Bloomfield Village Green

- Flag Seal

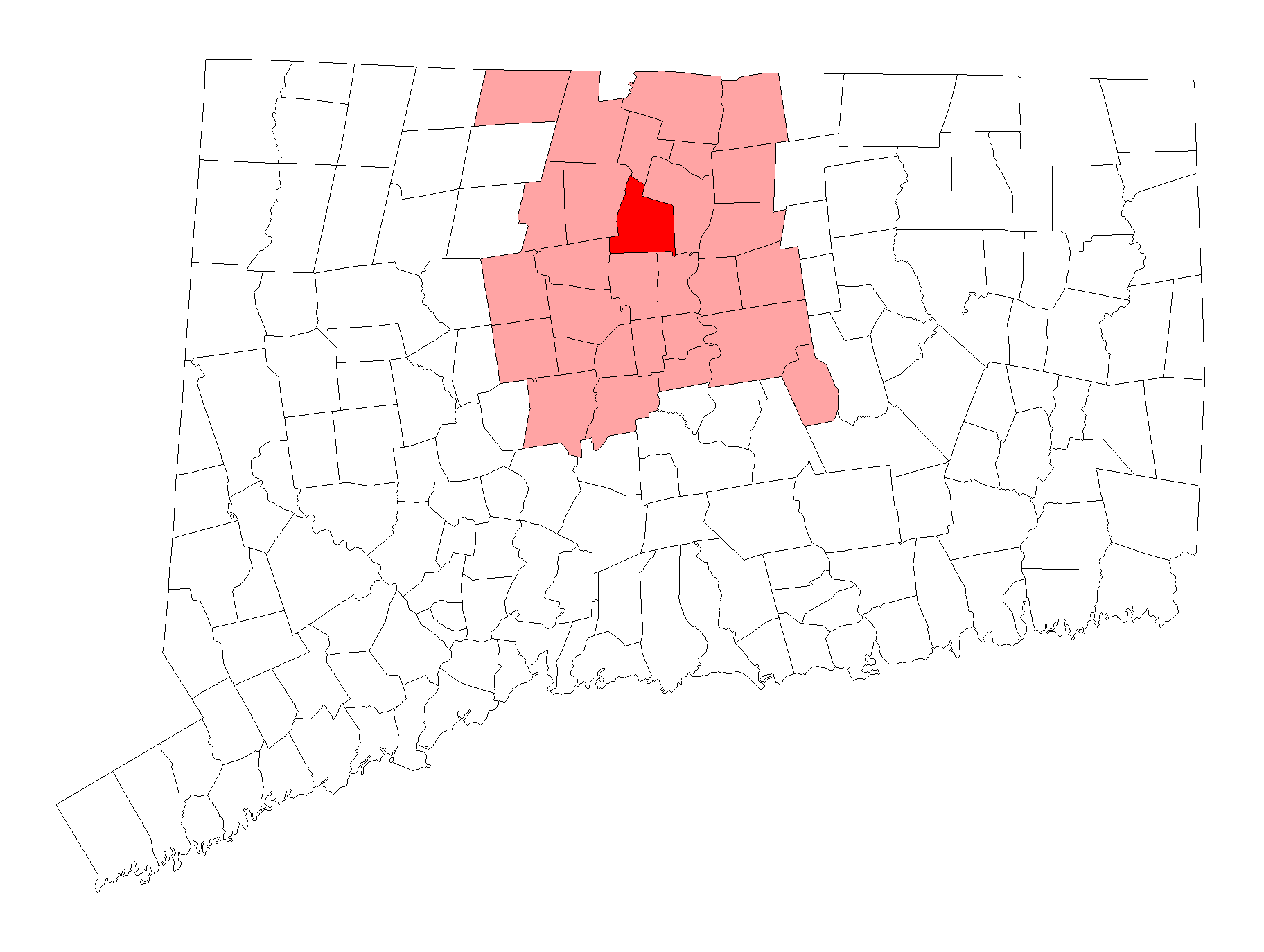
- Interactive map of Bloomfield, Connecticut
- Coordinates: 41°51′N 72°44′W
- Country: United States
- U.S. state: Connecticut
- County: Hartford
- Region: Capitol Region
- Settled: 1660
- Incorporated: May 28, 1835
- Communities: Bloomfield; Blue Hills; Cottage Grove; North Bloomfield

Government
  - Type: Council-manager
  - Town manager: Alvin D. Schwapp, Jr.
  - Town Council: Danielle Wong (D), Mayor; Anthony C. Harrington (D), Deputy Mayor; Kenneth McClary (D); Cindi Lloyd (D); Todd Cooper (D); Michael Oliver (D); Joe Merritt (R); Shamar Mahon (R); Elizabeth Waterhouse (R)

Area
  - Total: 26.3 sq mi (68.0 km^{2})
  - Land: 26.1 sq mi (67.6 km^{2})
  - Water: 0.15 sq mi (0.4 km^{2})
- Elevation: 125 ft (38 m)

Population (2020)
  - Total: 21,535
  - Density: 825.1/sq mi (318.6/km^{2})
- Time zone: UTC-5 (EST)
  - Summer (DST): UTC-4 (EDT)
- ZIP Code: 06002
- Area codes: 860/959
- FIPS code: 09-05910
- GNIS feature ID: 0213392
- Website: www.bloomfieldct.gov

Bloomfield is a suburb of Hartford in the Capitol Planning Region, Connecticut, United States. The town's population was 21,535 at the 2020 census, Bloomfield's highest decennial census count ever. Bloomfield is best known as the headquarters of healthcare services company Cigna.

== History ==
Originally land of the Poquonock Native Americans, the area was first settled in 1660 as part of Windsor, organized as the Parish of Wintonbury in 1736. Wintonbury comes from three names from neighboring towns Windsor, Farmington, and Simsbury. It was finally incorporated as the town of Bloomfield by the Connecticut General Assembly on May 28, 1835. Initially, the town's local economy was agriculturally based, mostly in shade tobacco, remaining as such until it developed as a postwar suburb of Hartford starting in the 1950s. Today, Bloomfield's local character varies. While the town's southern and eastern fringes are more densely populated and developed, the northern and western sections maintain a more rural feel with meadows, woods, and some remaining farmland.

== Geography ==
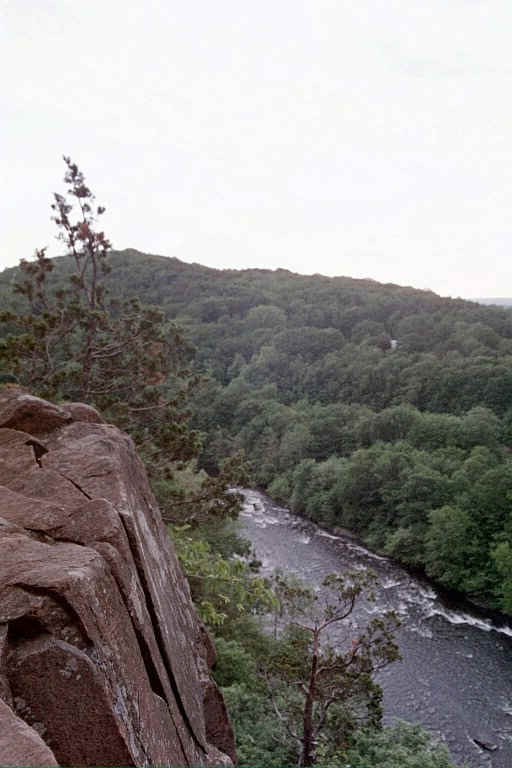
Tariffville Gorge

According to the United States Census Bureau, the town has a total area of 26.3 square miles (68.0 km^{2}), of which 26.1 square miles (67.6 km^{2}) is land and 0.15 square miles (0.4 km^{2}), or 0.63%, is water.

Bloomfield is bordered by Windsor to the northeast, East Granby to the north, Simsbury and Avon to the west, and West Hartford and Hartford to the south.

The northern border of Bloomfield is formed by the Farmington River. The west side of the town is flanked by Talcott Mountain, part of the Metacomet Ridge, a mountainous trap rock ridgeline that stretches from Long Island Sound to nearly the Vermont border. Notable features of the Metacomet Ridge in Bloomfield include Penwood State Park and the Tariffville Gorge of the Farmington River, on the borders of East Granby, Simsbury, and Bloomfield. The 51-mile (82 km) Metacomet Trail traverses the ridge.

== Transportation ==
The major east–west throughway in Bloomfield is Route 218, which starts at the Simsbury Road/Hall Boulevard split at the West Hartford line and inches north toward Cottage Grove Road before heading eastbound. Bloomfield also has two major north–south highways: Blue Hills Avenue (Route 187) and Bloomfield/Tunxis Avenues (Route 189). These highways merge when approaching the Windsor line but before returning to Bloomfield.

Eleven bus routes in Connecticut Transit's Hartford Division serve Bloomfield: 36, 46, 50, 52, 54, 56, 72, 74, 76, 92, and 153.

== Demographics ==
Historical population
Census	Pop.	Note	%±
1850	1,412		—
1860	1,401		−0.8%
1870	1,473		5.1%
1880	1,346		−8.6%
1890	1,308		−2.8%
1900	1,513		15.7%
1910	1,821		20.4%
1920	2,394		31.5%
1930	3,247		35.6%
1940	4,309		32.7%
1950	5,746		33.3%
1960	13,613		136.9%
1970	18,301		34.4%
1980	18,608		1.7%
1990	19,483		4.7%
2000	19,587		0.5%
2010	20,486		4.6%
2020	21,535		5.1%
2023 (est.)	21,884		1.6%
U.S. Decennial Census; 2010 2020

=== 2020 census ===
Bloomfield town, Hartford County, Connecticut – Racial and ethnic composition Note: the US Census treats Hispanic/Latino as an ethnic category. This table excludes Latinos from the racial categories and assigns them to a separate category. Hispanics/Latinos may be of any race.
Race / Ethnicity (NH = Non-Hispanic)	Pop 2000	Pop 2010	Pop 2020	% 2000	% 2010	% 2020
White alone (NH)	7,599	6,863	6,927	38.80%	33.50%	32.17%
Black or African American alone (NH)	10,445	11,518	11,434	53.33%	56.22%	53.09%
Native American or Alaska Native alone (NH)	33	38	41	0.17%	0.19%	0.19%
Asian alone (NH)	250	382	476	1.28%	1.86%	2.21%
Pacific Islander alone (NH)	3	8	3	0.02%	0.04%	0.01%
Other race alone (NH)	43	49	144	0.22%	0.24%	0.67%
Mixed race or Multiracial (NH)	496	479	813	2.53%	2.34%	3.78%
Hispanic or Latino (any race)	718	1,149	1,697	3.67%	5.61%	7.88%
Total	19,587	20,486	21,535	100.00%	100.00%	100.00%

=== 2000 Census ===
As of the census of 2010, there were 20,486 people, 8,554 households, and 5,343 families residing in the town. The population density was 753.0 inhabitants per square mile (290.7/km^{2}). There were 8,195 housing units at an average density of 315.0 per square mile (121.6/km^{2}). The racial makeup of the town was 35.7% White, 57.5% African American, 0.03% Native American, 1.9% Asian, 0.01% Pacific Islander, 1.70% from other races, and 3% from two or more races. Hispanic or Latino of any race were 5.6% of the population.

There were 8,554 households, out of which 19.3% had children under the age of 18 living with them, 41.8% were married couples living together, 16.9% had a female householder with no husband present, and 37.5% were non-families. 31.9% of all households were made up of individuals, and 17.0% had someone living alone who was 65 years of age or older. The average household size was 2.32 and the average family size was 2.94.

In the town, the population was spread out, with 21.4% under the age of 18, 5.8% from 18 to 24, 24.5% from 25 to 44, 26.6% from 45 to 64, and 21.7% who were 65 years of age or older. The median age was 47.9 years. For every 122 females there were 100 males. For every 130 females age 18 and over, there were 100 males.

The median income for a household in the town was $73,519, and the median income for a family was $84,735.

As of the census of 2000. Males had a median income of $42,860 versus $36,778 for females. The per capita income for the town was $28,843.

U.S. Census Bureau, 2010-2014 American Community Survey 5-Year Estimates, About 5.8% of families and 7.9% of the population were below the poverty line, including 7.2% of those under age 18 and 6.7% of those age 65 or over.

== Government and politics ==
Bloomfield has a Town council government. The Town Council elects a chair, who is designated as Mayor, two weeks after the election. Mayor Danielle Wong began her first term as Mayor in November 2022.

Bloomfield is reliably Democratic in presidential elections, having last voted Republican in 1956.

Bloomfield town vote by party in presidential elections
Year	Democratic	Republican	Third Parties
2024	83.79% 10,237	15.18% 1,854	1.03% 126
2020	85.85% 11,007	13.24% 1,698	0.91% 116
2016	82.80% 9,637	14.46% 1,683	2.74% 319
2012	83.41% 9,921	16.18% 1,925	0.41% 49
2008	84.96% 10,384	14.55% 1,778	0.49% 60
2004	76.58% 8,156	21.94% 2,337	1.47% 157
2000	78.20% 7,907	18.29% 1,849	3.51% 355
1996	74.15% 6,930	19.26% 1,800	6.59% 616
1992	65.40% 6,914	22.14% 2,341	12.46% 1,317
1988	65.36% 6,648	33.53% 3,410	1.11% 113
1984	57.56% 5,803	42.07% 4,241	0.37% 37
1980	51.99% 5,119	32.59% 3,209	15.42% 1,518
1976	55.73% 5,511	43.95% 4,346	0.32% 32
1972	52.83% 5,212	46.48% 4,585	0.69% 68
1968	60.17% 5,246	36.56% 3,187	3.27% 285
1964	70.59% 5,318	29.41% 2,216	0.00% 0
1960	54.64% 3,777	45.36% 3,136	0.00% 0
1956	37.45% 1,851	62.55% 3,091	0.00% 0

Voter registration and party enrollment as of November 1, 2022
Party	Active voters	Inactive voters	Total voters	Percentage
Democratic	9,521	646	10,167	59.93%
Republican	1,253	113	1,366	8.05%
Unaffiliated	4,817	418	5,235	30.86%
Minor parties	171	24	195	1.14%
Total	15,762	1,201	16,963	100%

== Economy ==
=== Top employers ===
According to Bloomfield's 2023 Comprehensive Annual Financial Report, the top employers in the town are:

#	Employer	# of Employees
1	Cigna	4,144
2	Kaman Corporation	2,002
3	Town of Bloomfield	1,292
4	HomeGoods	1,100
5	Trader Joe's	951
6	Seabury	620
7	Duncaster Retirement Community	498
8	Deringer-Ney	400
9	Jacobs Vehicle Systems	400
10	Pepperidge Farms	400

== Schools ==
Bloomfield is home to three secondary schools: the public Bloomfield High School, the inter-district Global Experience Magnet School (serving grades 6–12), and the Metropolitan Learning Center, a CREC school serving grades 6–12.

Bloomfield Public Schools also has:

- Pre-K3–K The Wintonbury Early Childhood Magnet School
- K–2 Laurel Elementary
- 3–4 Metacomet Elementary
- 5–6 Carmen Arace Intermediate
- 7–8 Carmen Arace Middle School

== Sports ==
Bloomfield-based amateur soccer team 3rd Eye FC play in the [[United Premier Soccer League#Division 1[11]|United Premier Soccer League Division 1]] New England Conference.

== Notable people ==
- Clarence H. Adams (1905–1987), commissioner of U.S. Securities and Exchange Commission and president of the Boston Celtics
- Anoyd, rapper and singer
- George Ansbro (1915–2011), radio announcer
- LeRoy Bailey Jr. (born 1946), pastor and author
- Edward C. Banfield, political scientist
- James G. Batterson (1823–1901), founder of Travelers Insurance Company
- Julia Brace (1807–1884), deaf/blind woman of 19th Century
- Lawrence Clay-Bey (born 1965), professional heavyweight boxer, born in town
- Marcus Cooper (born 1990), cornerback for Chicago Bears
- Joe D'Ambrosio (born 1953), sports broadcaster and play-by-play announcer
- Edgar Eno, state assemblyman for Wisconsin
- Oliver Filley (1806–1881), mayor of St. Louis from 1858 to 1861
- Dwight Freeney, NFL All-Pro defensive end for Indianapolis Colts, attended Bloomfield High School
- Bobby Gibson, educator and member of the Connecticut House of Representatives
- Edward H. Gillette (1840–1918), congressman for Iowa, born in town
- Jessica Hecht (born 1965), actress
- Jaimoe, drummer for Allman Brothers Band
- K.C. Jones (1932–2020), NBA Hall of Fame basketball player
- Charles Kaman (1919–2011), aeronautical engineer, businessman, inventor and philanthropist
- Ellie Kanner, film and television director and former casting director
- Joža Karas (1926–2008), musician and teacher who made public music composed by inmates of Theresienstadt concentration camp during World War II
- Noella Marcellino (born 1951), Benedictine nun who earned doctorate in microbiology from University of Connecticut
- Richard P. McBrien (1936–2015), Catholic theologian and author of landmark work 'Catholicism'.
- Lewis Rome (1933–2015), state senator representing Bloomfield (1971–1979); long-time resident
- Anika Noni Rose (born 1972), singer and actress, born in town
- Nykesha Sales (born 1976), WNBA basketball player, born in town
- Franz Schurmann (1926–2010), sociologist and historian
- Johann Smith (born 1987), soccer player
- Joseph M. Suggs Jr. (born 1940), politician, Bloomfield mayor, and Connecticut State Treasurer (1993–1995)
- James Thorpe (1915–2009), Princeton University professor and academic; lived his later years and died in town
- David Ushery (born 1967), television news anchor. As of 2024 lead anchor at 4pm, 6pm, 11pm newscasts for WNBC4.
- Douglas Wimbish (born 1956), bass player

== On the National Register of Historic Places ==
- Connecticut General Life Insurance Company (Cigna) Headquarters
- Capt. Oliver Filley House
- Francis Gillette House
- Old Farm Schoolhouse
- Southwest District School
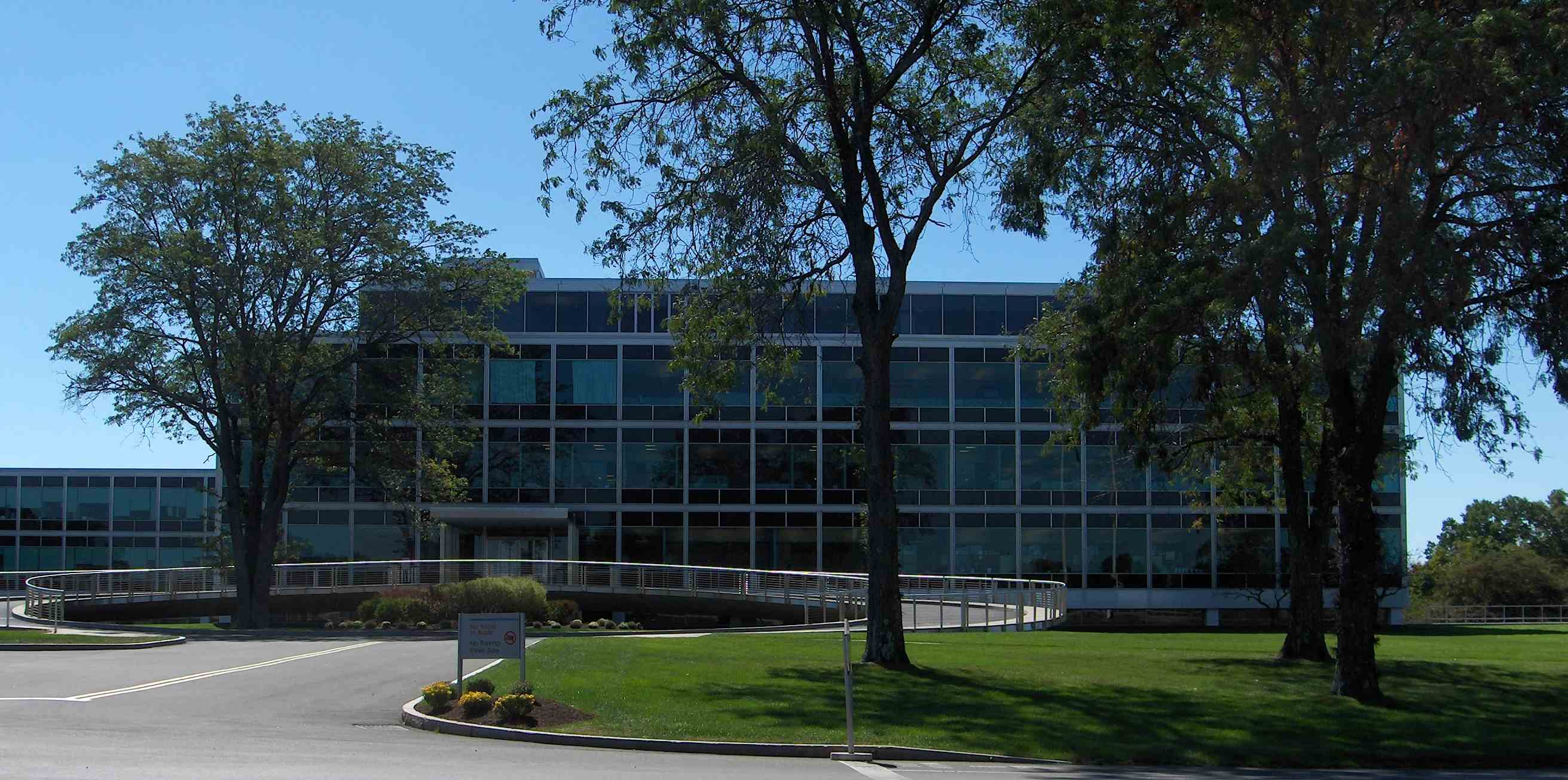
Cigna Headquarters

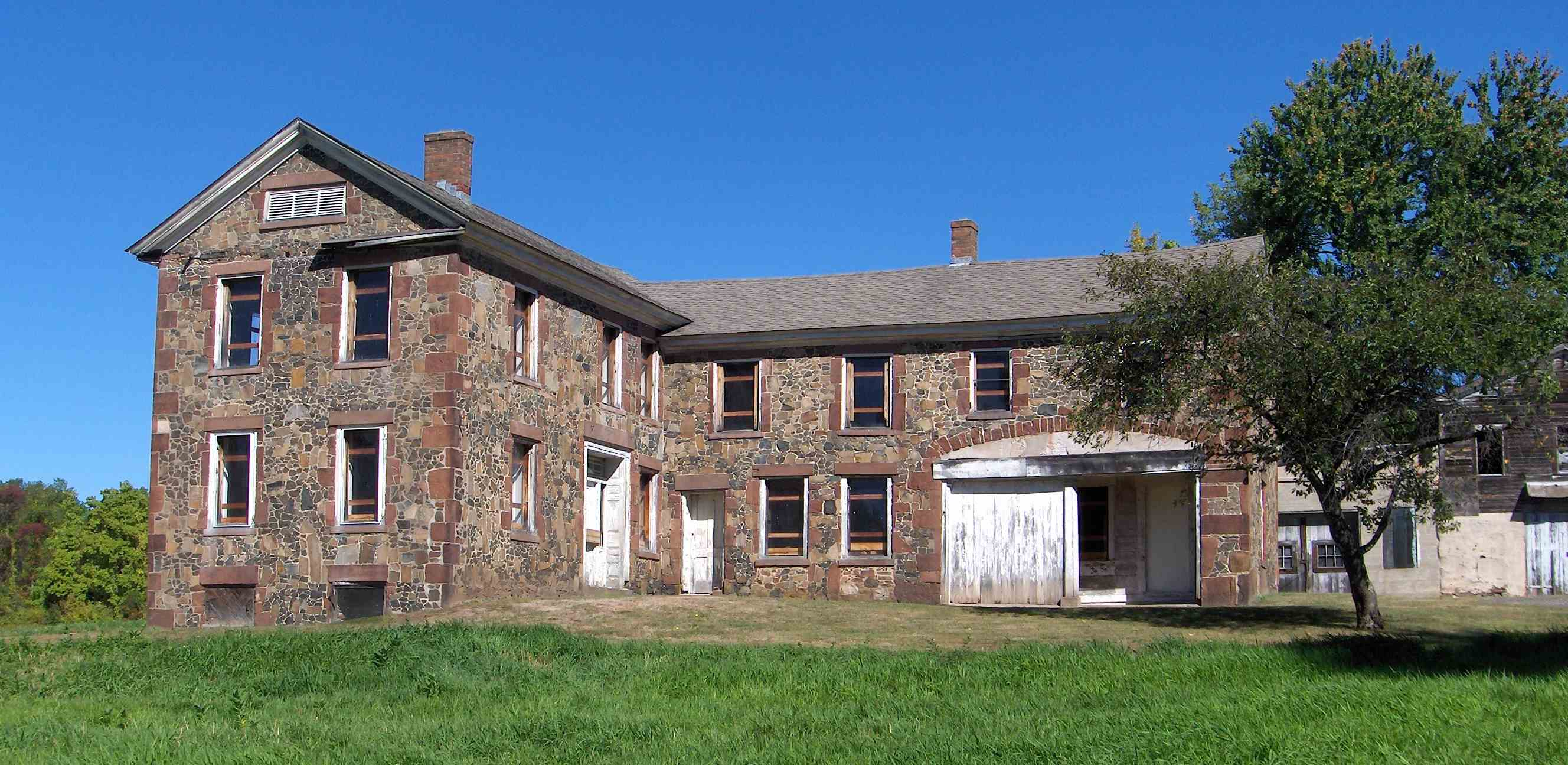
Capt. Oliver Filley House

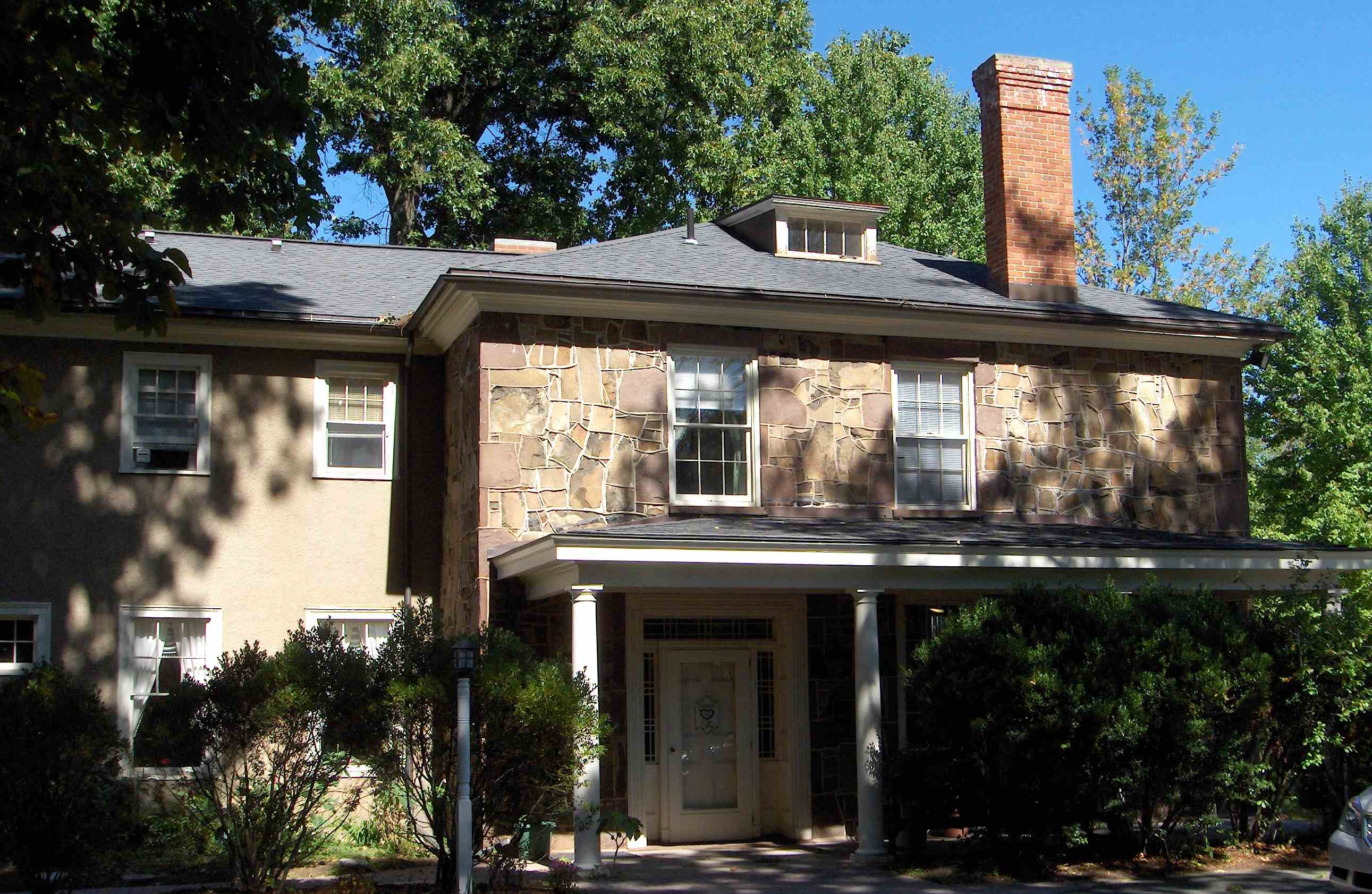
Francis Gillette House

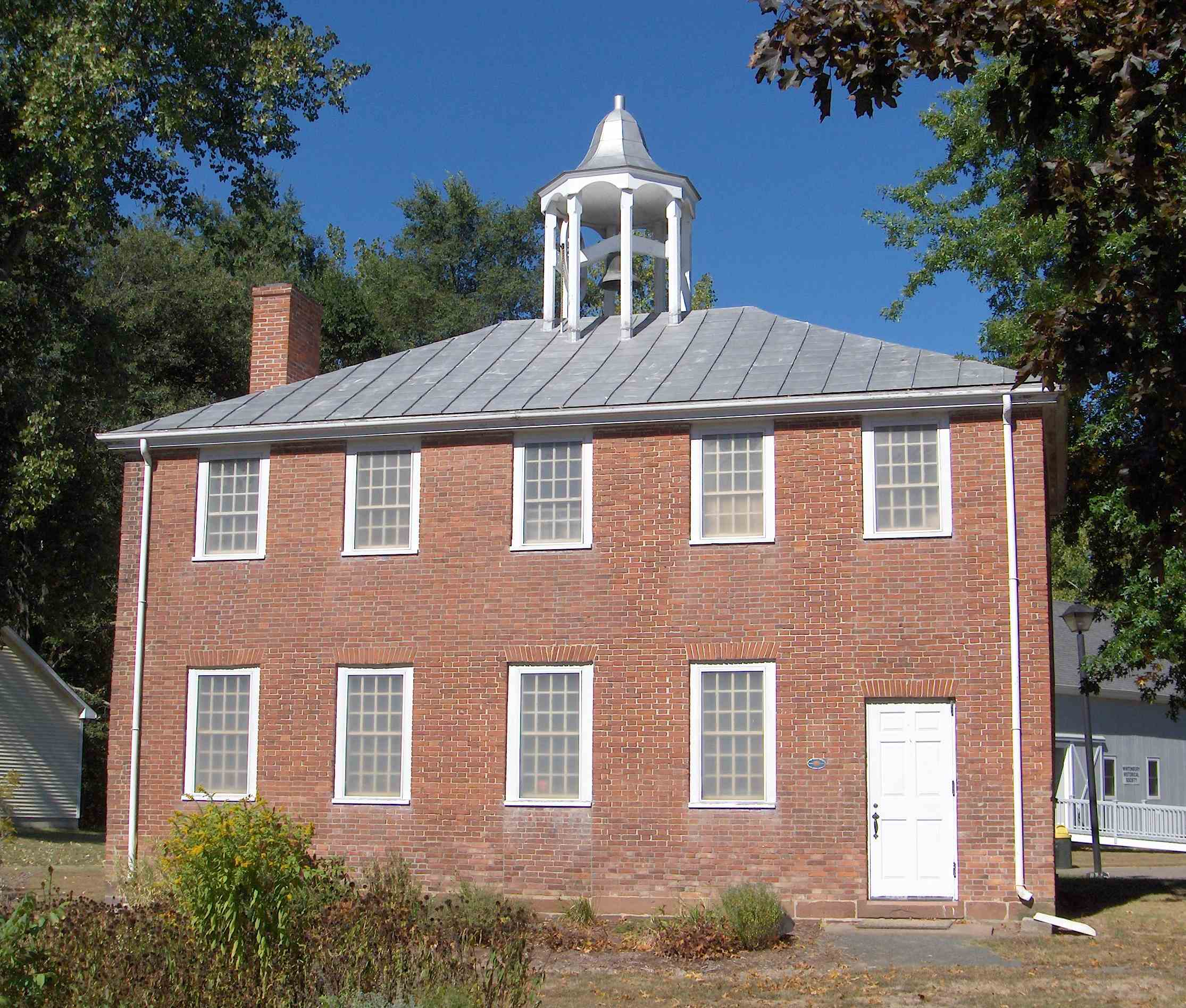
Old Farm Schoolhouse

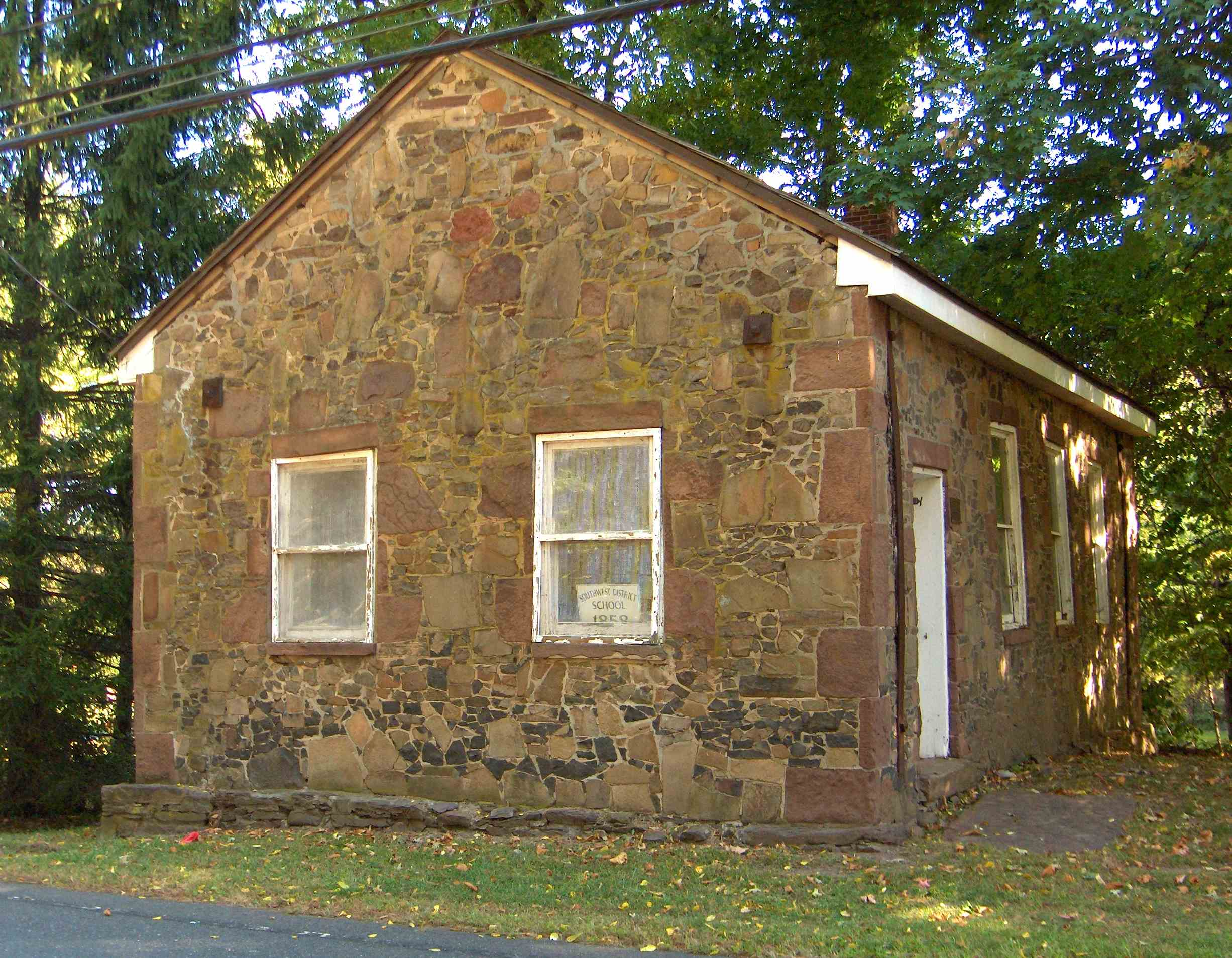
Southwest School District

== Places of interest ==
- The New England Muscle Bicycle Museum, with 120 bicycles from the 1960s and 1970s, is open by appointment
- The First Cathedral, the largest non-denominational church in New England
