= Walter Booth =

American politician (1791–1870)

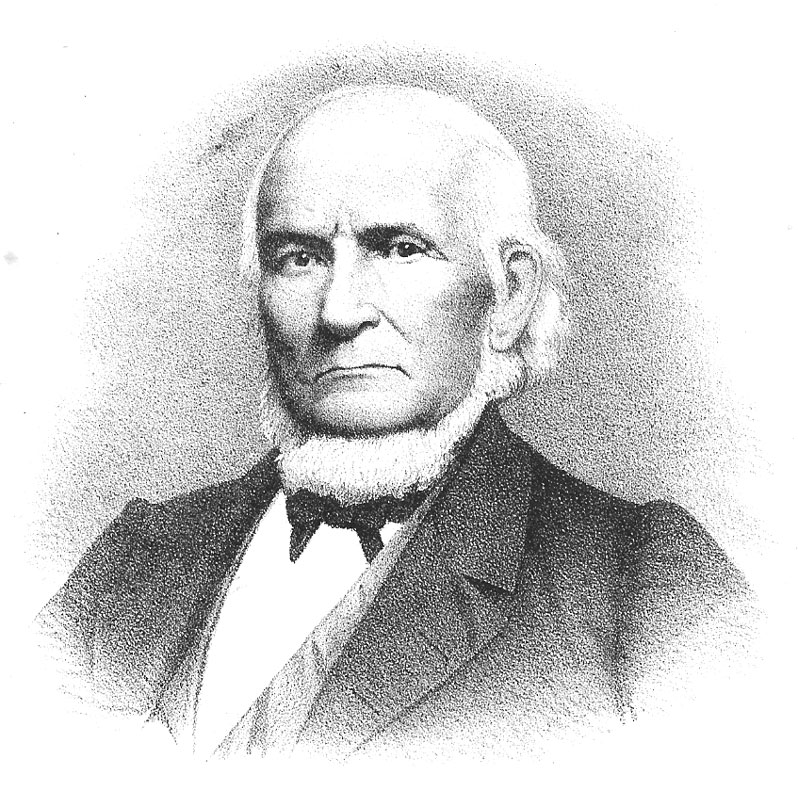

Member of the U.S. House of Representatives from Connecticut's 2nd district
- In office March 4, 1849 – March 3, 1851
- Preceded by: Samuel D. Hubbard
- Succeeded by: Colin M. Ingersoll

Member of the Connecticut House of Representatives
- In office 1838

Personal details
- Born: December 8, 1791 Woodbridge, Connecticut, U.S.
- Died: April 30, 1870 (aged 78) Meriden, Connecticut, U.S.
- Party: U.S. Free Soil Party
- Spouses: Laura née Mitchell (m. 1810; died 1841); Sarah née Holkins (m. 1842)
- Occupation: Politician, manufacturer

Military service
- Allegiance: Connecticut; United States
- Branch/service: United States Army
- Rank: Major-General
- Unit: Connecticut State Militia
- Commands: 10th Regiment (Col.); 1st Division (Maj-Gen.)

Walter Booth (8 December 1791 – 30 April 1870), was a manufacturing entrepreneur, banker and United States representative for Connecticut. He served as Major-General in the United States Army.

== Early life and background ==
Born at Woodbridge, Connecticut, the son of Walter Booth (1760–1825) by his wife Mary née Newton, he was educated at New Haven Common School.

Booth joined the Connecticut Militia, becoming Colonel of the 10th regiment of the second battalion of militia in 1825. Promoted Brigadier-General in the United States Army in 1827, he then served as Major-General of the 1st Division until 1834.

== Public life ==
In 1833, Booth co-founded the Meriden National Bank with Silas Mix, Samuel Yale, brother of William Yale, Elisha Cowles, Stephen Taylor, Ashabel Griswold, James S. Brooks, Noah Pomeroy and John D. Reynolds, forming its Board of Directors.

Appointed a Judge of New Haven County Court in 1834, Booth became President of the Meriden National Bank in 1836, then a member of the Connecticut State House of Representatives in 1838.

Booth was elected as a Free-Soiler to the 31st United States Congress (March 4, 1849 – March 3, 1851), unsuccessfully seeking re-election in 1850.

== Family and personal life ==
Booth arms

Intermarrying with many early colonial families, the Booths became established in New Haven County at Woodbridge then Meriden, Connecticut. Among his kinsmen was President Ulysses S. Grant.

A great-great-great-great-grandson of Colonel Sir John Booth (1610–1678), he was in remainder to the Booth baronetcy (cr. 1611). He married firstly in 1810 Laura Mitchell (died 1841), leaving issue. He married secondly in 1842 Sarah Holkins (died 1874).

Having resumed his former manufacturing enterprises, Booth died in 1870 being buried at the East Cemetery, Meriden.

Ancestors of Walter Booth

16. Charles Booth
8. Elisha Booth
17. Abigail Mepham
4. Alexander Booth
18. Alexander Wilmot
9. Hannah Wilmot
19. Mary Norris
2. Walter Booth
20. Samuel Newton
10. Samuel Baldwin
21. Rebecca Wilkinson
5. Sybil Baldwin
22. Henry Allen
11. Mercy Allen
23. Mercy Tibbals
1. Hon. Walter Booth
24. Samuel Newton
12. Samuel Newton
25. Phoebe Platt
6. Samuel Newton
26. Thomas Baldwin
13. Deborah Baldwin
27. Jerusha Clark
3. Mary Newton
28. John Camp
14. Nathaniel Camp
29. Mary Northrup
7. Mary Camp
30. Enos van de Kamp
15. Martha Kamp
31. Martha Baldwin

== See also ==
- Booth baronets

== Sources ==
- Louda, Jiří; Maclagan, Michael (1999) [1981], Lines of Succession: Heraldry of the Royal Families of Europe (2nd ed.), London: Little, Brown, ISBN 978-0-316-84820-6

U.S. House of Representatives
Preceded by Samuel D. Hubbard	Member of the U.S. House of Representatives from Connecticut's 2nd congressional district 1849 – 1851	Succeeded by Colin M. Ingersoll
