= Commercial Trust Company Building =

- U.S. National Register of Historic Places
- U.S. Historic district – Contributing property
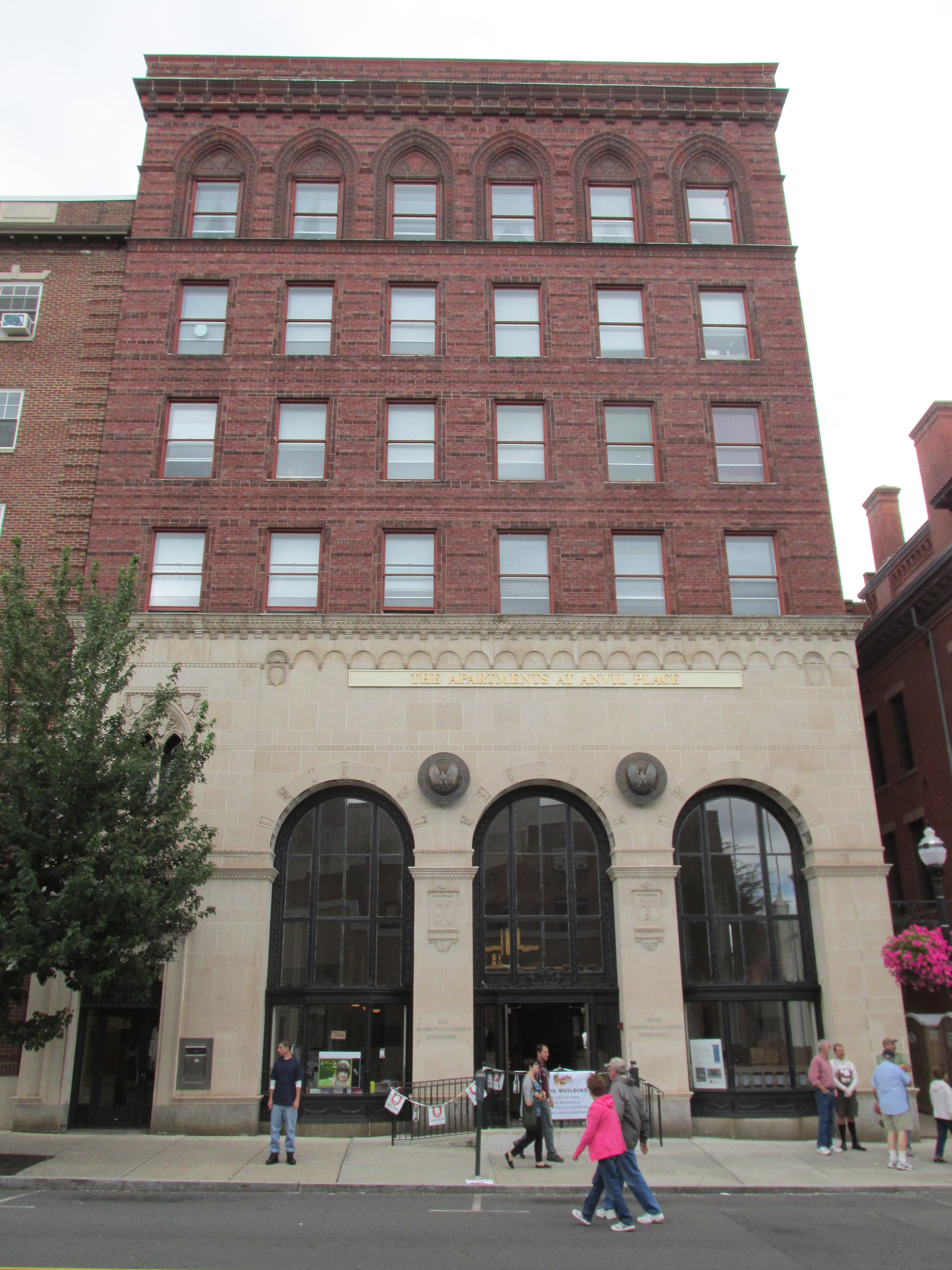

- Location within Connecticut Location within the United States
- Location: 55 West Main Street, New Britain, Connecticut
- Coordinates: 41°40′4″N 72°46′59″W
- Architect: Hopkins & Dentz
- Part of: Downtown New Britain (ID16000210)
- NRHP reference No.: 09000141

Significant dates
- Added to NRHP: March 17, 2009
- Designated CP: May 3, 2016

The Commercial Trust Company Building, also known locally as the Anvil Building, and now The Apartments at Anvil Place, is a historic commercial building at 55 West Main Street in downtown New Britain, Connecticut. Built in 1927, it is a distinctive example of Romanesque Revival architecture with Gothic features. It was listed on the National Register of Historic Places in 2009, and is a contributing property to the Downtown New Britain historic district.

== Description and history ==
The Commercial Trust Company Building is prominently located in the center of New Britain, just west of the City Hall complex on the north side of West Main Street. It is a seven-story masonry structure, with an exterior finished in limestone on the lower levels, and brick on the upper ones. The lower three levels form a monumental facade, with three tall rounded-arch openings mostly filled with glass, and a side . The center one has a bronze doorway providing access to what was historically the bank lobby, which has tall ceilings, marble floors, and a surviving teller's counter. The upper four floors of the building, now converted to apartments, are faced in brick, with the top-floor windows in Gothic-arched openings. The building is crowned by a corbelled brick cornice. The decorative elements of the facade include repeated occurrences of blacksmith's anvils, which were one of the symbols of the Commercial Trust Company.

The building was erected in 1927 for the Commercial Trust Company, which was organized in 1915 as an alternative to the New Britain National Bank. The architects were Hopkins & Dentz of New York. The building is a statement of the organization's (and the city's) prosperity in the 1920s. By 1929, with the advent of the Great Depression, the company fell on hard times and closed its doors in December 1930. The building was eventually purchased by the New Britain National Bank.

== See also ==
- National Register of Historic Places listings in Hartford County, Connecticut
