= Sir John Booth =

English army officer (1610–1678)

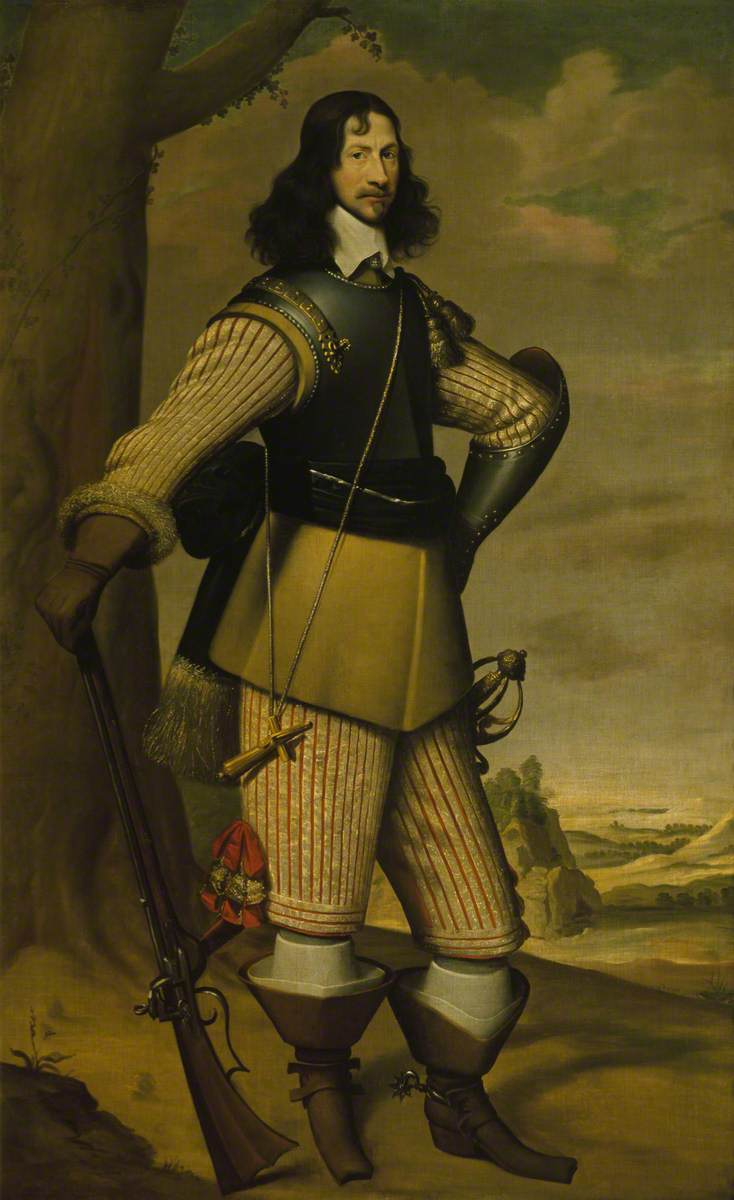
c. 1640 portrait of Booth by Edward Bower

Colonel Sir John Booth (1610 – 9 May 1678) was an English army officer who served in the English Civil War.

== Background ==
Booth arms

Born at Dunham Massey, Cheshire, he was the fifth son of Sir George Booth, 1st Baronet (1566–1652) and Katherine Anderson (died 1639), daughter of Sir Edmund Anderson, Chief Justice of the Court of Common Pleas.

His elder surviving brother, William Booth (1595–1636), Lord Lieutenant of Cheshire, who succeeded to the family estates, was father of Sir George Booth, 2nd Baronet (cr. Baron Delamer in 1661).

Adherents of the Presbyterian tradition in the Church of England, the Booths were supporters of the Whig Party in Parliament.

== Military career ==
Commissioned into the Cheshire Militia, Booth served in the Parliamentary Army under General the Earl of Stamford during the First Civil War, being promoted Colonel. Appointed Governor of Warrington in 1645, he remained loyal during the 1648 Second English Civil War before his family switched sides following the execution of Charles I in January 1649.

During the Interregnum, Booth was active in the Royalist cause and, accused of conspiring to restore Charles II, was briefly imprisoned in the Tower of London.

An accomplished soldier, he commanded his nephew's militia during Booth's Uprising and after the Stuart Restoration in May 1660 Colonel Booth was knighted.

Sir John and Lady Booth later became seated at Woodford Hall near Over in Cheshire, after acquiring the manor of Woodford from Dr Nathan Paget, eventual heir to the Masterson family estate.

== Family ==
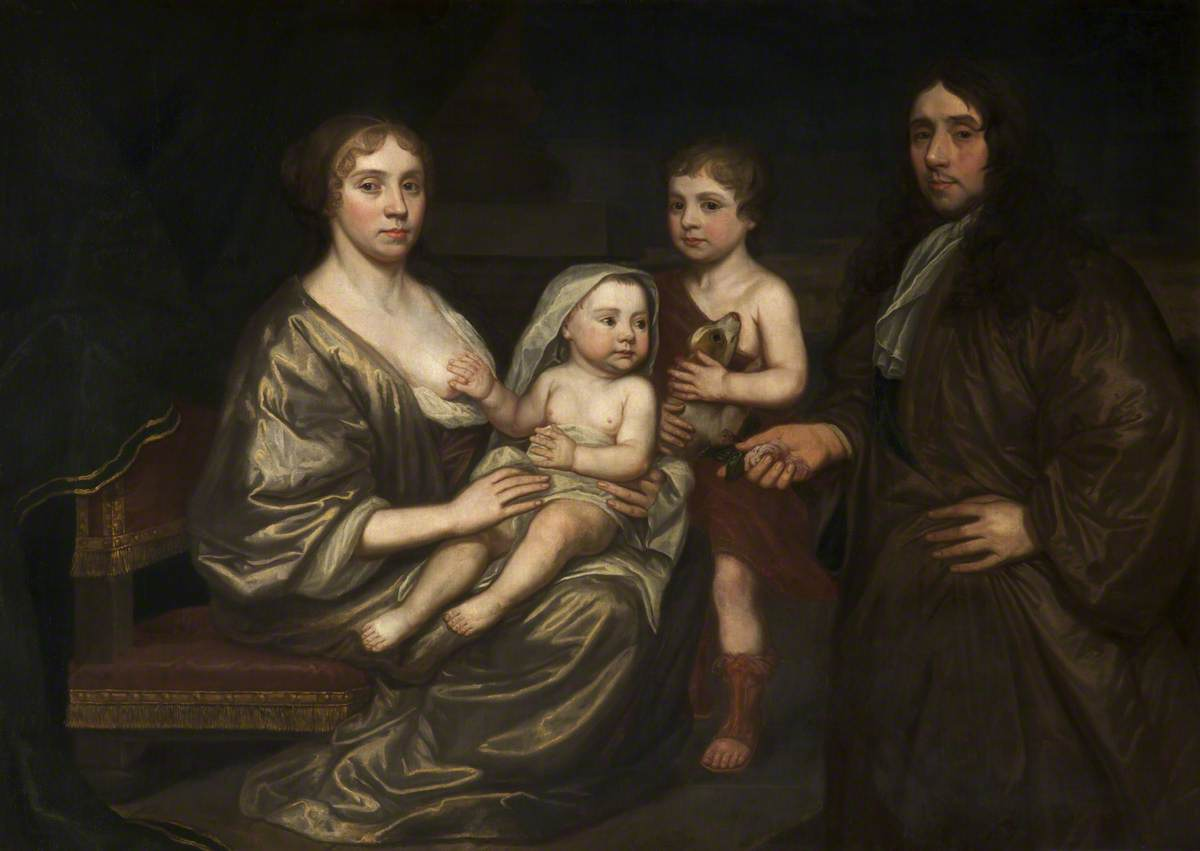
George Booth, at Chester Castle, with his wife Martha and children

Colonel Booth married firstly in 1627 Dorothy St John (died 1655), daughter and heiress of the Hon. Sir Anthony St John MP, younger brother of Oliver St John, 1st Earl of Bolingbroke, having issue:

- George Booth (1635–1719), lord of the manor of Woodford, serjeant-at-law, protonotary to the County Palatine of Chester, married Martha Hawtrey (died 1718), leaving:
  - John Booth KC (1669–1722), Bencher Middle Temple, married Elizabeth Proger (died 1707), eldest daughter and co-heiress of Edward Proger MP, leaving an only surviving child:
    - Elizabeth Booth (died 1748), married Edmund Maskelyne (1698–1744), Counsel to the Secretary of State's Office, leaving issue including the Revd Dr Nevil Maskelyne FRS, Astronomer Royal (1765–1811)
  - Captain George Booth (1672–1708), Foot Guards
  - Katherine Booth (1672–1765), married Captain James Howard (1679–1722), of Boughton Hall, late Royal Westminster Troop of Horse and nephew of Poet Laureate John Dryden, leaving issue
  - Elizabeth Booth (1676–1768), married Thomas Tyndale (died 1747), of Bathford House, Somerset, leaving issue
  - Robert Booth (1678–1711), barrister-at-law, married Thomasin Hanmer (died 1712), daughter of Sir Thomas Hanmer, 2nd Baronet
- Colonel Sir St John Booth JP (1637–1688), knighted 1684, seated at Woodford Hall near Over, Cheshire married Anne Owen (died 1700), leaving with other issue:
  - Thomas Booth (1663–1736), cotton planter of Ware Neck, Virginia, married Mary Cooke (died 1723), daughter of the Hon. Mordecai Cooke DCL, Chief Justice of Gloucester County; ancestor of General William Booth Taliaferro
- Ensign John Booth (1637–1689), Puritan émigré and selectman of Southold, Suffolk County, married Hannah Giles (died 1668); ancestor of General Walter Booth
- Captain Thomas Booth (1640–1677), Royal Marines

He married secondly, in 1659, Anne née Gobert (died 1676), widow of Colonel Thomas Legh of Adlington and of Colonel Alexander Rigby of Middleton.

Colonel Sir John Booth died 9 May 1678, being buried in Chester Cathedral.

== See also ==
- Booth baronets
- Dunham Massey
