= City Hall-Monument District =

Historic district in Connecticut, United States

- U.S. National Register of Historic Places
- U.S. Historic district
- U.S. Historic district – Contributing property
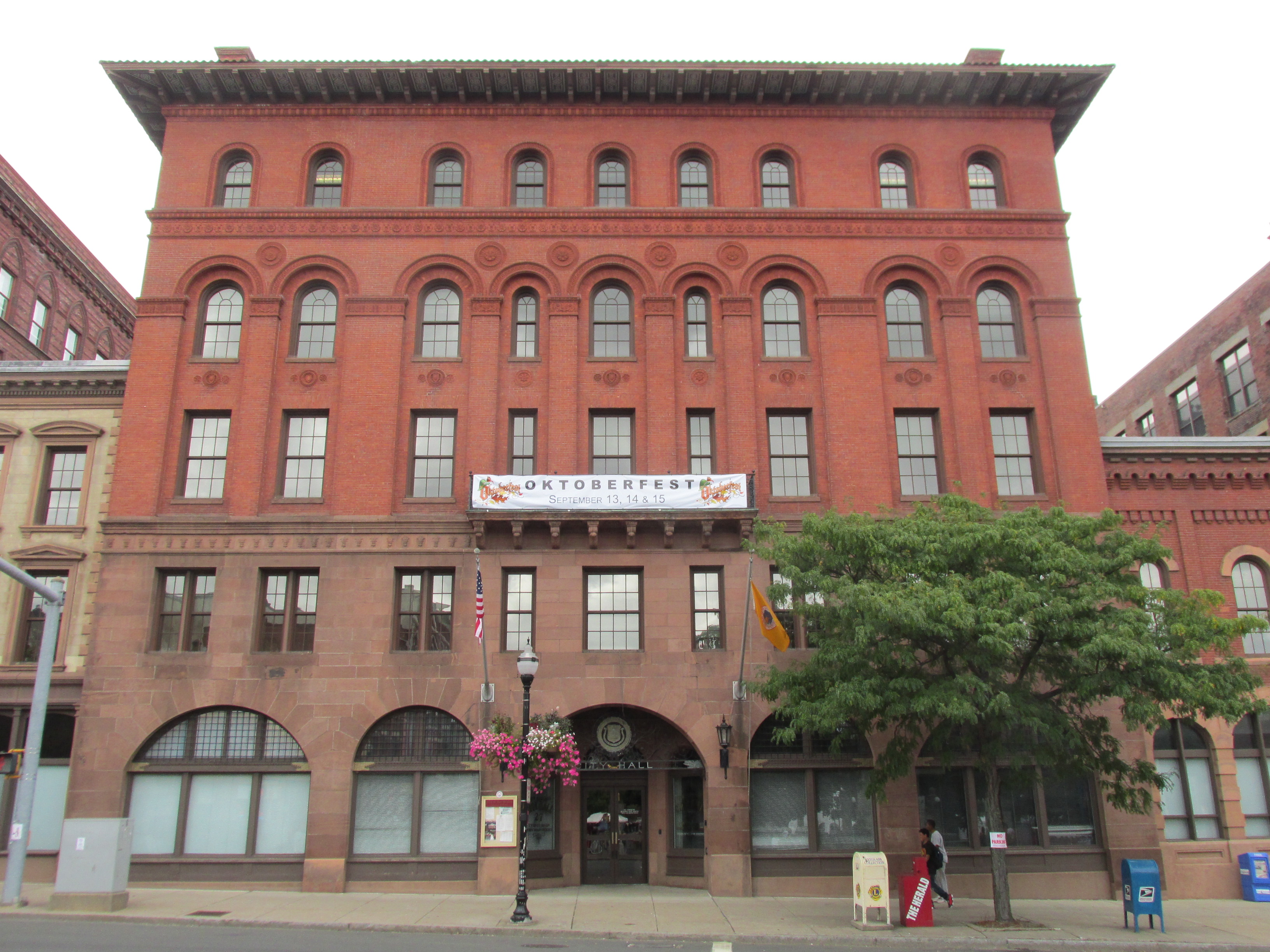
- New Britain City Hall

- Location within Connecticut Location within the United States
- Location: West Main Street and Central Park, New Britain, Connecticut
- Coordinates: 41°40′5″N 72°46′59″W
- Area: 1 acre (0.40 ha)
- Built: 1885
- Architect: McKim, Mead & White
- Architectural style: Renaissance, Beaux Arts
- Part of: Downtown New Britain (ID16000210)
- NRHP reference No.: 73001957

Significant dates
- Added to NRHP: February 28, 1973
- Designated CP: May 3, 2016

The City Hall-Monument District encompasses the city hall complex and central municipal park of New Britain, Connecticut. A prominent part of the city's downtown business district, the city hall is an architecturally distinguished former hotel, while the park includes a substantial Beaux Arts Civil War memorial. The district was listed on the National Register of Historic Places in 1973.

== Description and history ==
New Britain's City Hall is a complex of three buildings on the north side of West Main Street between Washington and Main Streets. They stand facing the triangular Central Park, formed by West Main and one-way branchest of Main Street. The park is a predominantly paved area, with plantings lining its east and west sides. At its center is a circular grassy area, raised behind a low retaining wall, which has at its center the city's memorial to its American Civil War participants. It is a richly decorated square structure built out of limestone. Each face has Doric columns supporting a gabled pediment as its first stage, the elements framing different things on each face. Above this is another square stage with inscribed panels on each side and gold-leaf sconces at the corners. A circular pedestal set above this supports a golden winged victory statue. The monument was designed by Ernest Flagg and placed in 1900.

City Hall consists of a large central five-story building, flanked on the left by a small three-story building and the right by a two-story one. The central building is the former Russwin Hotel, built in 1885 to a Romanesque design by Joseph Morrill Wells, an assistant to the famous architect Stanford White. It appears very much like an Italian palazzo, with an exterior that extensively uses terra cotta tile. It is notable as the only known work that is ascribed exclusively to Wells. When the building was adapted for use as city hall, the design work was done by McKim, Meade & White. The building to the left is a former post office, built in 1871, and that to the right is the former New Britain National Bank Building, dating to 1860–61. These two buildings are both well preserved examples of commercial Italianate architecture.

== See also ==
- National Register of Historic Places listings in Hartford County, Connecticut
