= Booth baronets of Dunham Massey (1611) =

Booth arms

The Booth baronetcy, of Dunham Massey in the County of Chester, was created on 22 May 1611 for Sir George Booth, High Sheriff of both Lancashire and Cheshire. The Booths were one of the initial 18 families raised to the baronetage by James I in 1611.

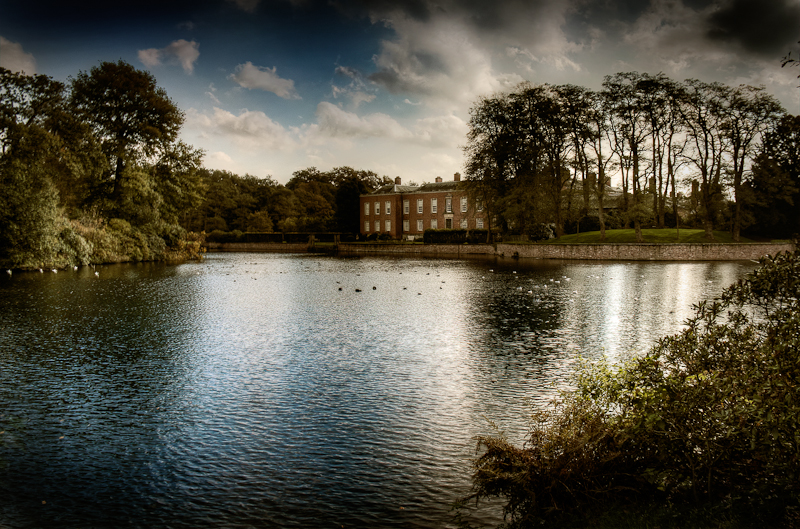
Dunham Massey, Cheshire

The 2nd Baronet was his grandson, also Sir George Booth; and in 1661 he was elevated to the peerage as Baron Delamer, of Dunham Massey in the County of Chester. On his death the title passed to his eldest surviving son, Henry Booth, 2nd Baron Delamer; he served as Chancellor of the Exchequer between 1689 and 1690 and on 17 April 1690 he was created Earl of Warrington in the peerage of England. The earldom became extinct on the death of his son, the 2nd Earl, in 1758.

The family titles then devolved upon the 2nd Earl of Warrington's first cousin, Nathaniel Booth, 4th Baron Delamer. He was the eldest surviving son of the Hon. and Very Revd Robert Booth, Dean of Bristol, younger son of the 1st Baron. On his death in 1770 the barony became extinct.

Lord Delamer was succeeded in the baronetcy by his second cousin, the Revd Sir George Booth, 6th Baronet, a grandson of Nathaniel Booth (1627–1692), lord of the manor of Mottram St Andrew and younger brother of the 1st Baron.

The baronetcy became dormant on his death in 1797, in the absence of a claim to the title from the senior male representative of Colonel Sir John Booth.

== Booth baronets, of Dunham Massey (1611) ==
- Sir George Booth, 1st Baronet (1566–1652)
- Sir George Booth, 2nd Baronet (1622–1684) (created Baron Delamer in 1661)

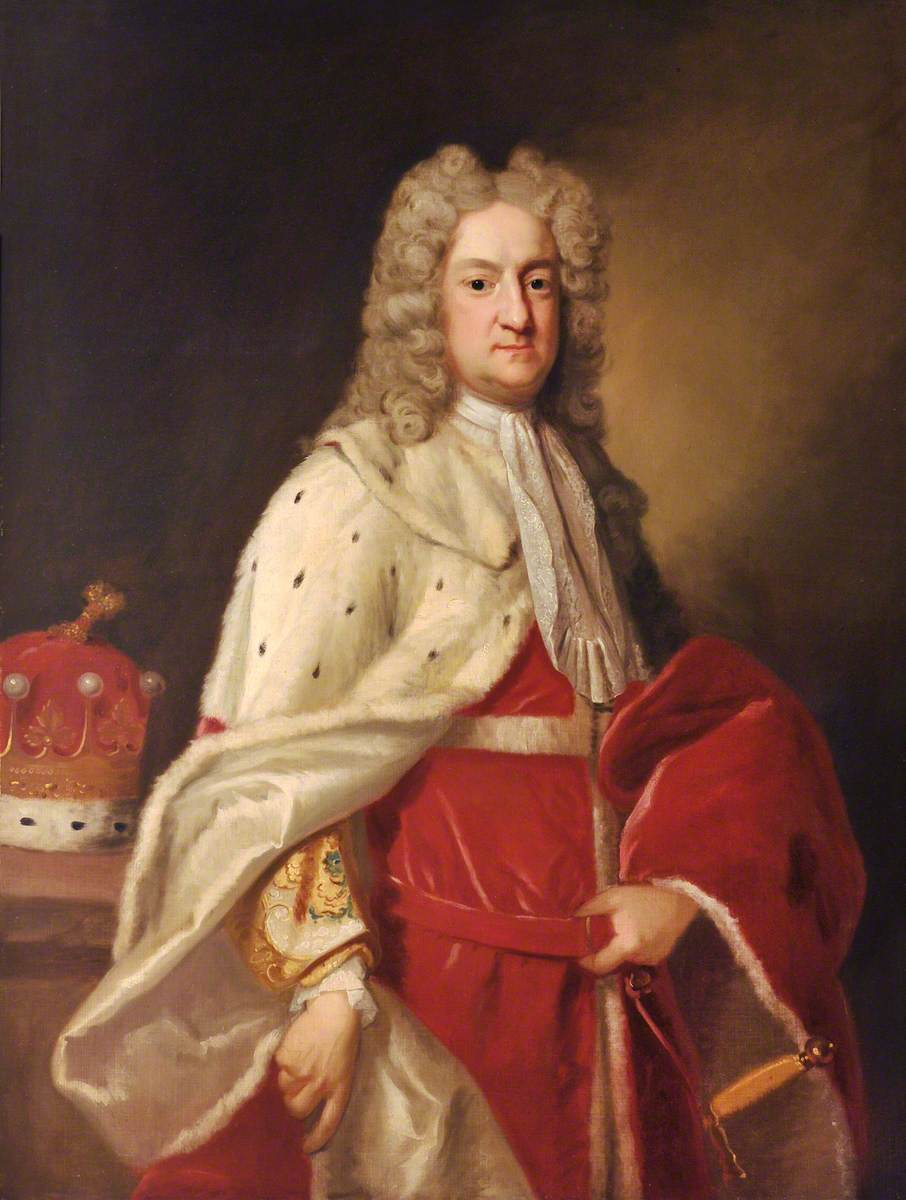
George Booth, 2nd Earl of Warrington

=== Barons Delamer (1661) ===
- George Booth, 1st Baron Delamer (1622–1684)
- Henry Booth, 2nd Baron Delamer (1652–1694) (created Earl of Warrington in 1690)

=== Earls of Warrington (1690) ===
- Henry Booth, 1st Earl of Warrington (and 3rd Baronet) (1652–1694)
- George Booth, 2nd Earl of Warrington (and 4th Baronet) (1675–1758)

=== Barons Delamer (1661) ===
- Nathaniel Booth, 4th Baron Delamer (and 5th Baronet) (1709–1770)

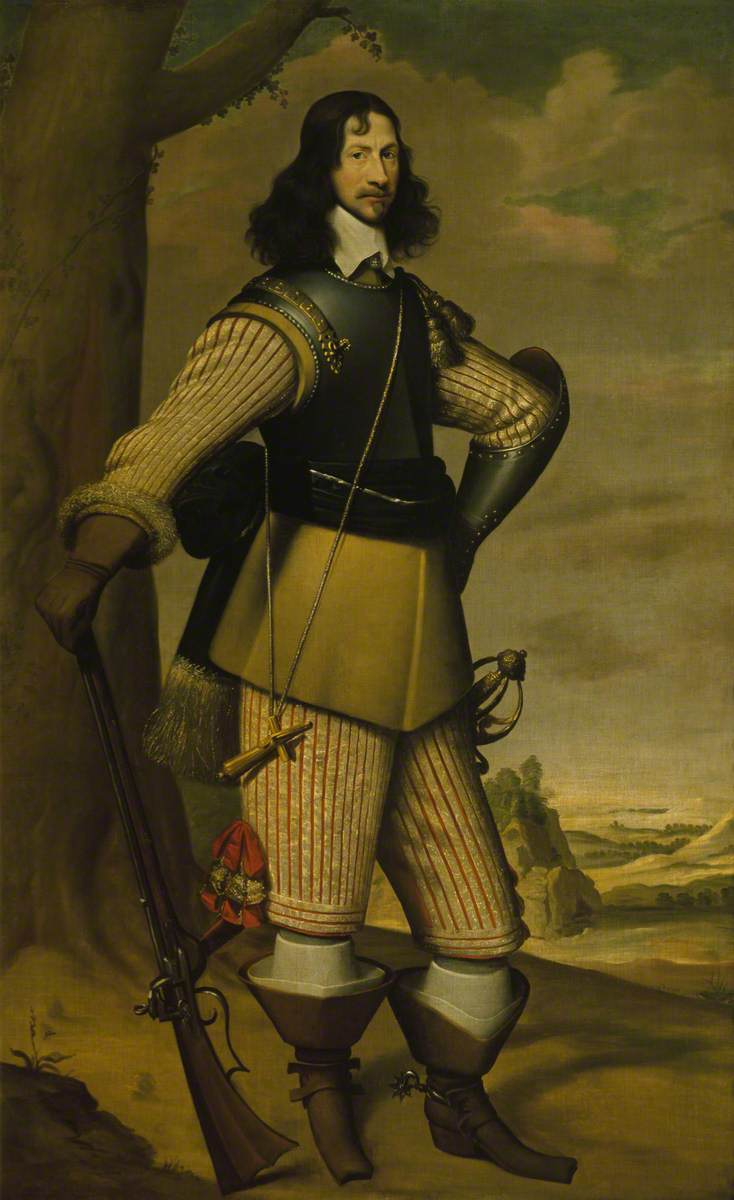
Sir John Booth, the progenitor of the Booths of Connecticut

=== Booth baronets, of Dunham Massey ===
- Revd Sir George Booth, 6th Baronet (1724–1797)

== Family and descendants ==
William Booth MP (1595–1636), eldest son of Sir George Booth, 1st Baronet, married Vere Egerton (died 1629), daughter of Sir Thomas Egerton MP.

The Hon. Langham Booth, younger son of the 1st Earl of Warrington, sat as Member of Parliament for Cheshire and Liverpool.

Lady Mary Booth (1704–1772), only child and heiress of the 2nd Earl of Warrington married in 1736, her third cousin, Harry Grey, 4th Earl of Stamford.

In 1796 the titles Baron Delamer and Earl of Warrington were revived in the peerage of Great Britain for their son, George Grey, 5th Earl of Stamford, who refused the offer of a marquessate to become the Earl of Stamford and Warrington.

== See also ==
- Booth baronets
- Dunham Massey
