= William B. Taliaferro =

Confederate Army general

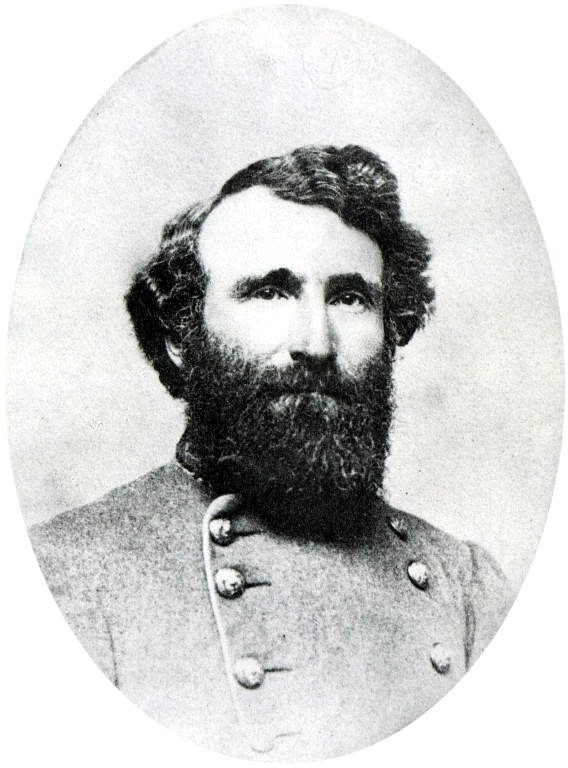
- General William B. Taliaferro
- Born: William Booth Taliaferro; December 28, 1822; Gloucester County, Virginia, US
- Died: February 27, 1898 (aged 75); Gloucester County, Virginia, US
- Burial place: Ware Church Cemetery, Gloucester County
- Relatives: James A. Seddon (uncle)
- Military career
- Allegiance: United States of America; Confederate States of America
- Branch: United States Army; Confederate States Army; United States Army
- Service years: 1846-48 (USA); 1861–65 (CSA)
- Rank: Major (USA); Major General (Virginia Militia); Brigadier General (CSA)
- Units: 9th U.S. Infantry Regiment; 11th U.S. Infantry Regiment
- Commands: District of South Carolina; District of Eastern Florida; District of Savannah; Jackson's Division—II Corps; Taliaferro's Brigade—Jackson's Division; 23rd Virginia Infantry
- Conflicts: Mexican–American War; American Civil War
- Other work: Judge, State Politician, States' Rights Advocate

William Booth Taliaferro (/ˈtɒlɪvər/ TOL-iv-ər; December 28, 1822 – February 27, 1898) was a United States Army officer, a lawyer, legislator, Confederate general in the American Civil War, and Grand Master of Masons in Virginia.

== Early and family life and education ==
William Booth Taliaferro was born in Gloucester County, Virginia, to an Anglo family, the Taliaferros. He was the son of Frances Amanda Todd (Booth) and Warner Throckmorton Taliaferro, and the nephew of James A. Seddon, who would become Secretary of War for the Confederate States of America under Jefferson Davis.

Taliaferro attended Harvard University and The College of William and Mary, graduating from the latter in 1841.

== Soldier, planter and politician ==
Taliaferro joined the U.S. Army during the Mexican–American War, fighting in both the 11th and 9th U.S. Infantry regiments. After the war, Taliaferro operated plantations using enslaved labor. He also entered public life, winning election as a member of the Virginia House of Delegates. He also became a prominent backer of James Buchanan's presidential campaign in 1856. Taliaferro also continued his military service as commander of a division of the Virginia state militia; he commanded at Harpers Ferry following the raid of that town's arsenal by John Brown. He, with the sheriff, was in charge of Brown's execution.

== Civil War ==
Taliaferro became commander of Virginia's state militia following Virginia's secession action on April 17, 1861; indeed, in what might be Virginia's 1st act of aggression of the war, on April 18, 1861, Virginia State Militia Major General Taliaferro was sent to take command at Norfolk, Virginia. Later he took command of the 23rd Virginia Infantry as a colonel. He fought several engagements in 1861 and by the end of the year had ascended to brigade command, where he led Confederate forces at the Battle of Greenbrier River, in what is now West Virginia.

He served with Thomas J. "Stonewall" Jackson through the Valley Campaign and the Seven Days Battles. After Brig. Gen. Charles Sidney Winder was killed at Cedar Mountain, Taliaferro took over command of the Stonewall Division. He led it for the next three weeks, but at Brawner's Farm on August 28, 1862, he was badly wounded. Taliaferro spent the next few months recuperating and resumed division command just before the Battle of Fredericksburg in December.

Taliaferro was a strict and aloof commander who alienated many of his troops. There is at least one known circumstance when one of his troops actually assaulted him, though Taliaferro was unscathed. Taliaferro chafed under the command of General Jackson, complaining to his political colleagues in Virginia about Jackson's tactics and treatment of the men. Jackson later protested Taliaferro's promotion to brigadier general, while Taliaferro was still under Jackson's command; however, Jackson respected Taliaferro's leadership and military ability and did not continue to stand in his way. Jackson later would select Taliaferro for temporary divisional command in specific engagements.

After Fredericksburg, Taliaferro was given command of the District of Savannah. In this capacity he led troops at the Battle of Fort Wagner on Morris Island, a battle which is depicted in the movie Glory. Taliaferro was commended for his service in that battle.

In 1864, Taliaferro was given command of all forces in the Eastern District of Florida, which made him the overall commander at the Battle of Olustee that February. He subsequently returned to South Carolina, where he was made commander of all forces in that state. Taliaferro was still in command when Maj. Gen. William T. Sherman entered the state from Savannah.

== Postbellum career ==
After the war, Taliaferro lived in Gloucester County. He served again in the state legislature and as a judge and sat on the board of the College of William and Mary and the Virginia Military Institute. He was elected Grand Master of Masons in Virginia in 1874. He died at his home, "Dunham Massie", aged 75, and is buried in Ware Church Cemetery, Gloucester County, Virginia. His collected papers are located at the Special Collections Research Center at the College of William and Mary. Taliaferro was also the namesake of a residence hall at William and Mary. William and Mary has renamed it after Hulon L. Willis Sr. M.Ed. ’56, a World War II veteran and the first African American student enrolled at the institution.

== Family tree ==
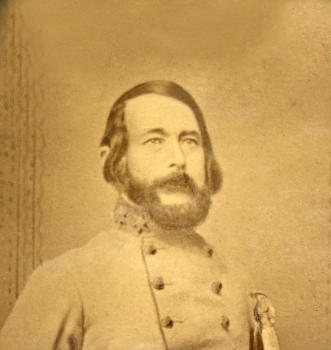
Colonel Alexander Galt Taliaferro

Bartholomew Taliaferro (1530, Venice – September 1601, London, England; bur. 22 September 1601) married Joane Lane on 1 January 1583 at St. Michael's Cornhill in the City of London, England.

General Taliaferro's matrilineal great-great-great-great-great-grandfather was Colonel Sir John Booth, Governor of Warrington during the English Civil War.

The general's brother, Alexander Galt Taliaferro, of Culpeper, Virginia, was Colonel of the 13th then the 23rd Virginia Infantry.

== See also ==
- List of American Civil War generals (Confederate)
- Taliaferro
