= 23rd Virginia Infantry Regiment =

- Flag of Virginia, 1861
- Active: May 1861 – April 1865
- Disbanded: April 1865
- Country: Confederacy
- Allegiance: Confederate States of America
- Branch: Confederate States Army
- Type: Infantry
- Engagements: American Civil War: Battle of Cheat Mountain; Jackson's Valley Campaign; Seven Days' Battles; Second Battle of Bull Run; Battle of Antietam; Battle of Fredericksburg; Battle of Chancellorsville; Battle of Gettysburg; Battle of Cold Harbor; Valley Campaigns of 1864; Appomattox Campaign

Commanders
- Notable commanders: Colonel William B. Taliaferro

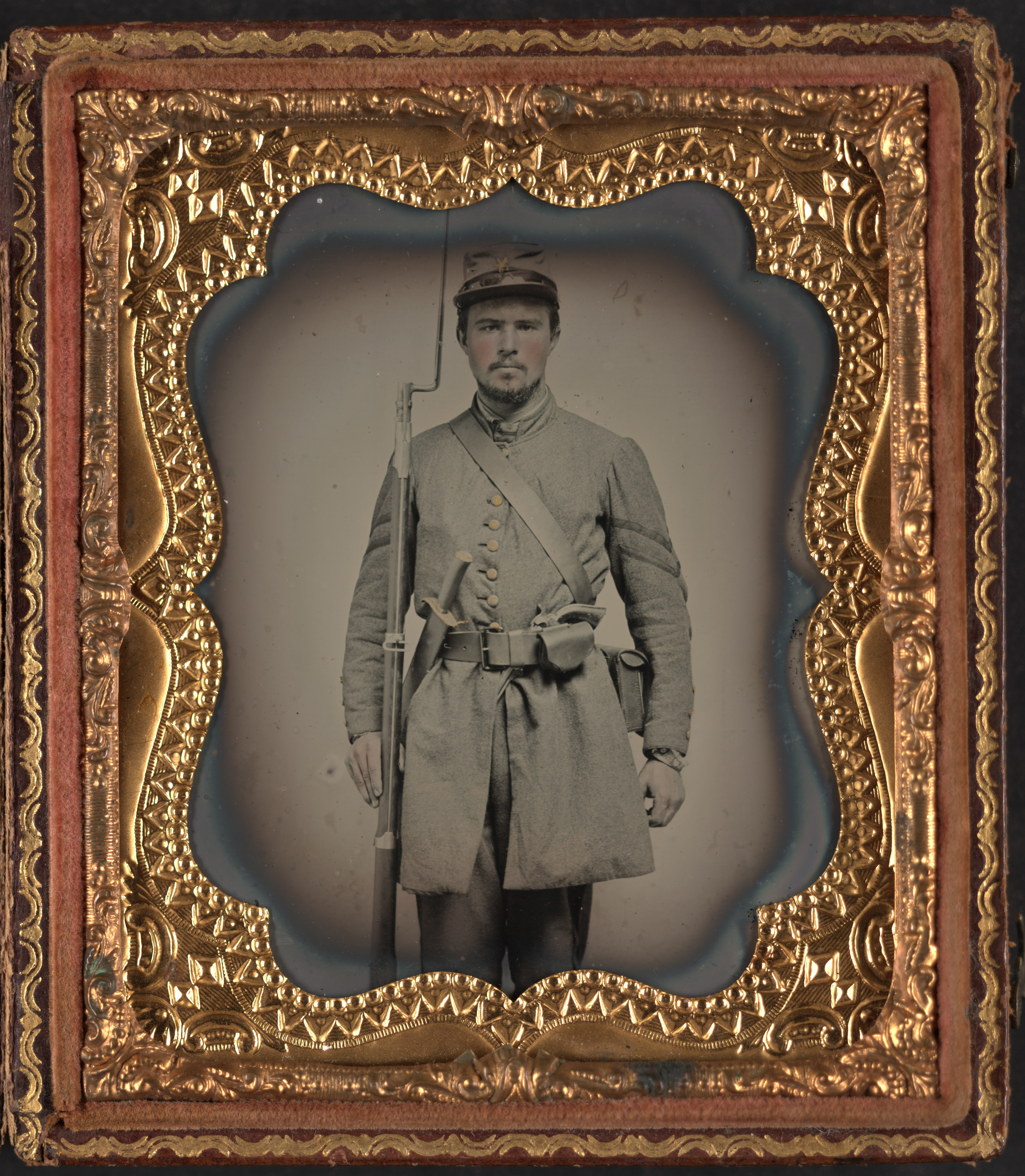
Corporal C. Dorma Clarke of Co. F, 23rd Virginia Infantry Regiment

The 23rd Virginia Infantry Regiment was an infantry regiment raised in Virginia for service in the Confederate States Army during the American Civil War. It fought mostly with the Army of Northern Virginia.

The 23rd Virginia completed its organization in May, 1861. Its members were recruited at Richmond and in the counties of Louisa, Amelia, Halifax, Goochland, Prince Edward, and Charlotte.

This regiment participated in Lee's Cheat Mountain Campaign, saw action at Greenbrier River, and took part in Jackson's Valley operations. Later it was assigned to Taliaferro's, Colston's, Steuart's, and W. Terry's Brigade, Army of Northern Virginia. The unit was involved in the campaigns of the army from the Seven Days' Battles to Cold Harbor, then moved with Early to the Shenandoah Valley and ended the war at Appomattox.

It reported 28 casualties at Carrick's Ford, 4 at Laurel Hill, 49 at First Kernstown, and 41 at McDowell. During May, 1862, it contained 600 effectives, lost 5 killed and 27 wounded at Cedar Mountain, had 1 killed and 13 wounded at Second Manassas, and reported 10 killed, 70 wounded, and 2 missing at Chancellorsville. Of the 251 engaged at Gettysburg, seven percent were disabled. It surrendered with 8 officers and 49 men.

The field officers were Colonels Alexander G. Taliaferro and William B. Taliaferro; Lieutenant Colonels Clayton G. Coleman, Jr., James H. Crenshaw, George W. Curtis, John P. Fitzgerald, and Simeon T. Walton; and Majors J.D. Camden, Joseph H. Pendleton, Andrew J. Richardson, and Andrew V. Scott.

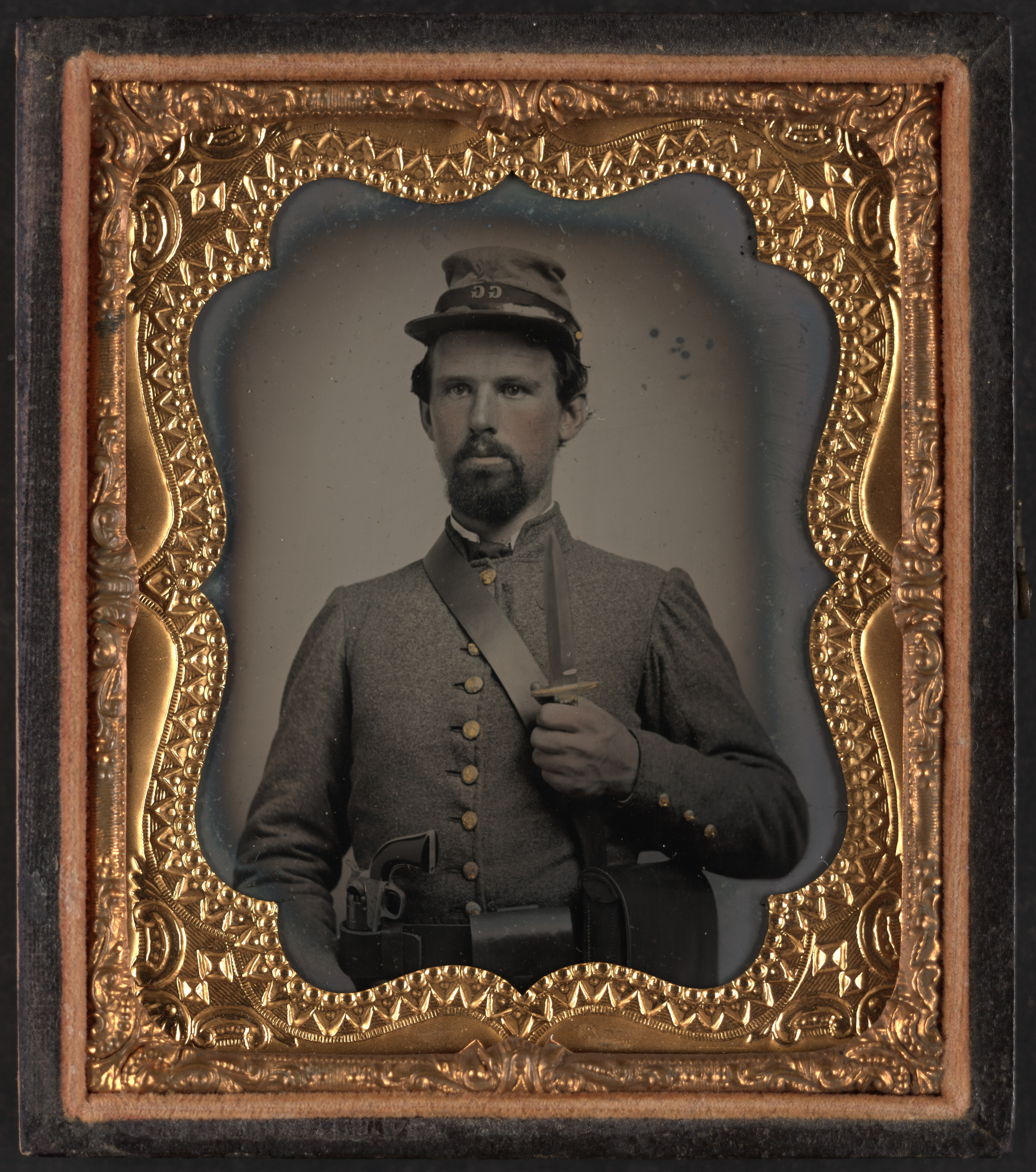
Corporal Edward Lindsey Clarke of Co. F, 23rd Virginia Infantry Regiment

== See also ==
- List of Virginia Civil War units
