= Silas Mix =

American politician

Silas Mix (1808 – August 19, 1882) was an American lawyer and politician who served as Secretary to Connecticut Governor Henry W. Edwards.

Mix, the son of William and Lucy (Benham) Mix, was born in New Haven, Connecticut, in 1808. He graduated from Yale University in 1827. Upon graduation he entered Yale Law School, where he continued until the autumn of 1829, when he was admitted to the bar in his native city. Soon after he entered the office of the Hon. Senator Nathan Smith, then at the head of the profession, and at once stepped into a large and valuable practice. He mingled also assiduously in politics, and perhaps the asperities of such conflicts acting on a nervous temperament tended to unsettle his mind. In 1832 and again in 1833 he represented New Haven in the Connecticut General Assembly, and in the latter year was appointed Executive Secretary of Governor Henry W. Edwards.

After a gradual loss of business, owing to his increasing moodiness and irritability, traces of insanity began to show themselves, and about 1850 he was taken to the Retreat for the Insane in Hartford, where he was confined until his death, August 19, 1882, at the age of 74.

He was never married.
