= Downtown New Britain =

- U.S. National Register of Historic Places
- U.S. Historic district
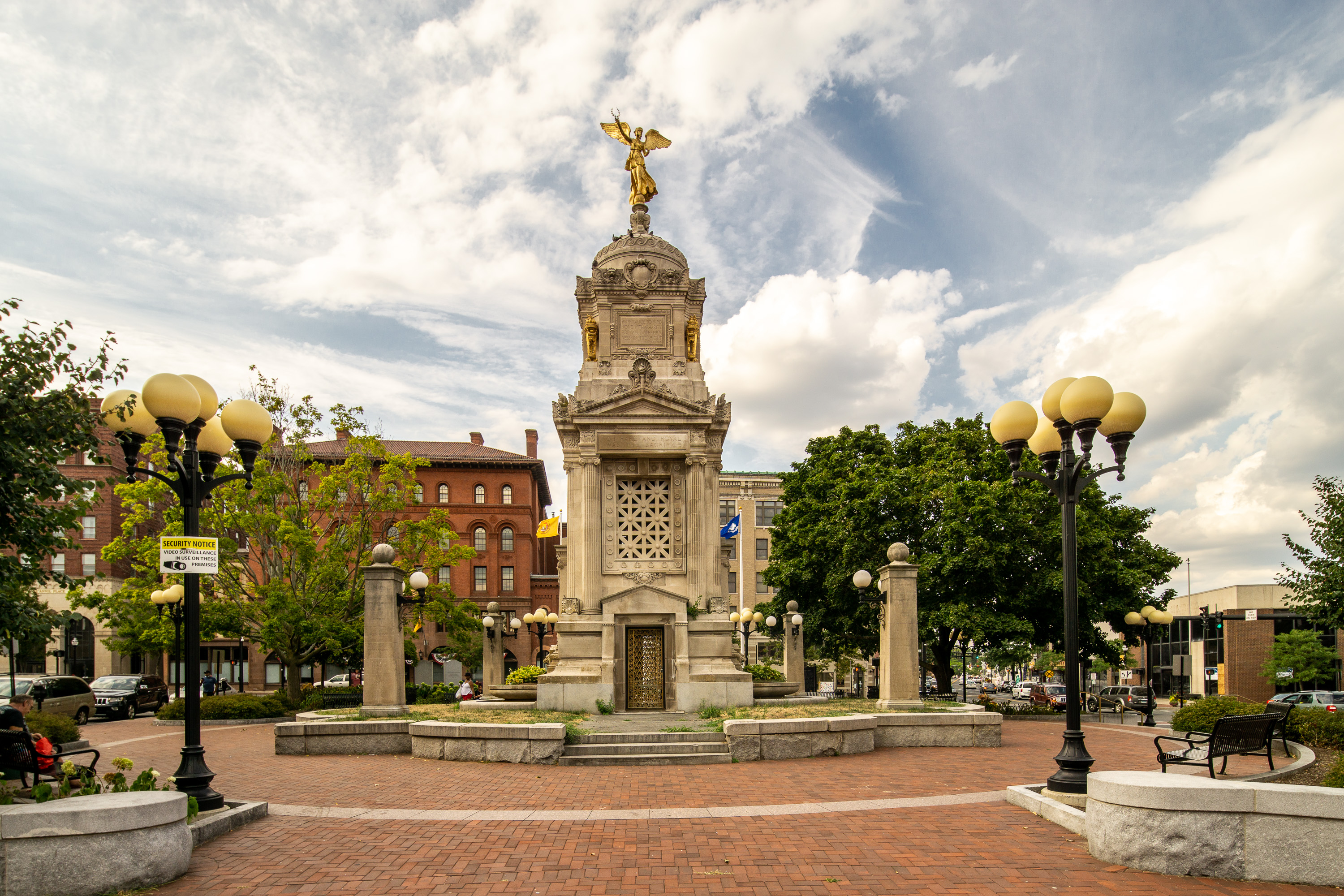

- Location within Connecticut Location within the United States
- Location: Roughly bounded by CT 72, Main Street, Franklin Square, Whiting Street, Arch Street, and High Street, New Britain, Connecticut
- Coordinates: 41°39′41″N 72°46′47″W
- Area: 80 acres (32 ha)
- Architect: Multiple
- Architectural style: Late Victorian; Late 19th & Early 20th Century Revival; Moderne; Art Deco
- NRHP reference No.: 16000210
- Added to NRHP: May 30, 2016

Downtown New Britain is the historic commercial and civic heart of the city of New Britain, Connecticut. It is located in the southern part of the city, anchored by the triangular Central Park and City Hall on the north, and by Franklin Park on the south. The city was one of Connecticut's industrial powerhouses of the 19th and early 20th centuries, which is reflected in the abundance, style, and quality of the architecture found in the downtown. The area was listed on the National Register of Historic Places in 2016.

== History ==
New Britain is an industrial city located about 10 miles (16 km) southwest of Hartford. Somewhat uniquely among the state's industrial cities, it is not located along a major waterway, and developed relatively late (mid-19th century) as an industrial center specialized in precision manufacturing. By the end of the 19th century, it was one of Connecticut's most ethnically diverse and prosperous cities, and its downtown area reflects this. Industrial facilities, at first small family operations in or near the downtown, were eventually located outside the downtown, but near transportation routes (particularly the railroads and horse-drawn trolleys), and its industrial workers, management, and leadership all had a presence there. New Britain was incorporated as a city in 1871.

The city's prosperity continued until after World War II, when shifts in transportation and living patterns led to a decline in the downtown area. It was damaged by several major fires in the early 1940, and construction of the access highways prompted a population exodus in the 1950s and 1960s, as well as razing portions of the downtown area. Since the 1970s, city leaders have sought to revitalize the downtown by repurposing its historic buildings and instituting a complete streets policy.

== Setting ==
Downtown New Britain is located in the south-central portion of the municipal boundaries, on both sides of Connecticut Route 72 and west of Connecticut Route 9, both limited-access roads serving the city. Near its center is City Hall, located in the former Russwin Hotel building on the north side of Central Park, where the city's Soldiers' Monument is located. The densest commercial development is located west of City Hall, and extending south on Main Street to Arch and Elm Streets. Arch Street and Franklin Square anchor the southern portion of the downtown area, which has more residential elements, including apartment blocks, and a number of churches, built in the 19th and early 20th centuries to serve a diversity of immigrant groups and religious views.

== See also ==
- National Register of Historic Places listings in Hartford County, Connecticut
