= Clara T. O'Connell School =

Historic building in Bristol, Connecticut, US

- U.S. National Register of Historic Places
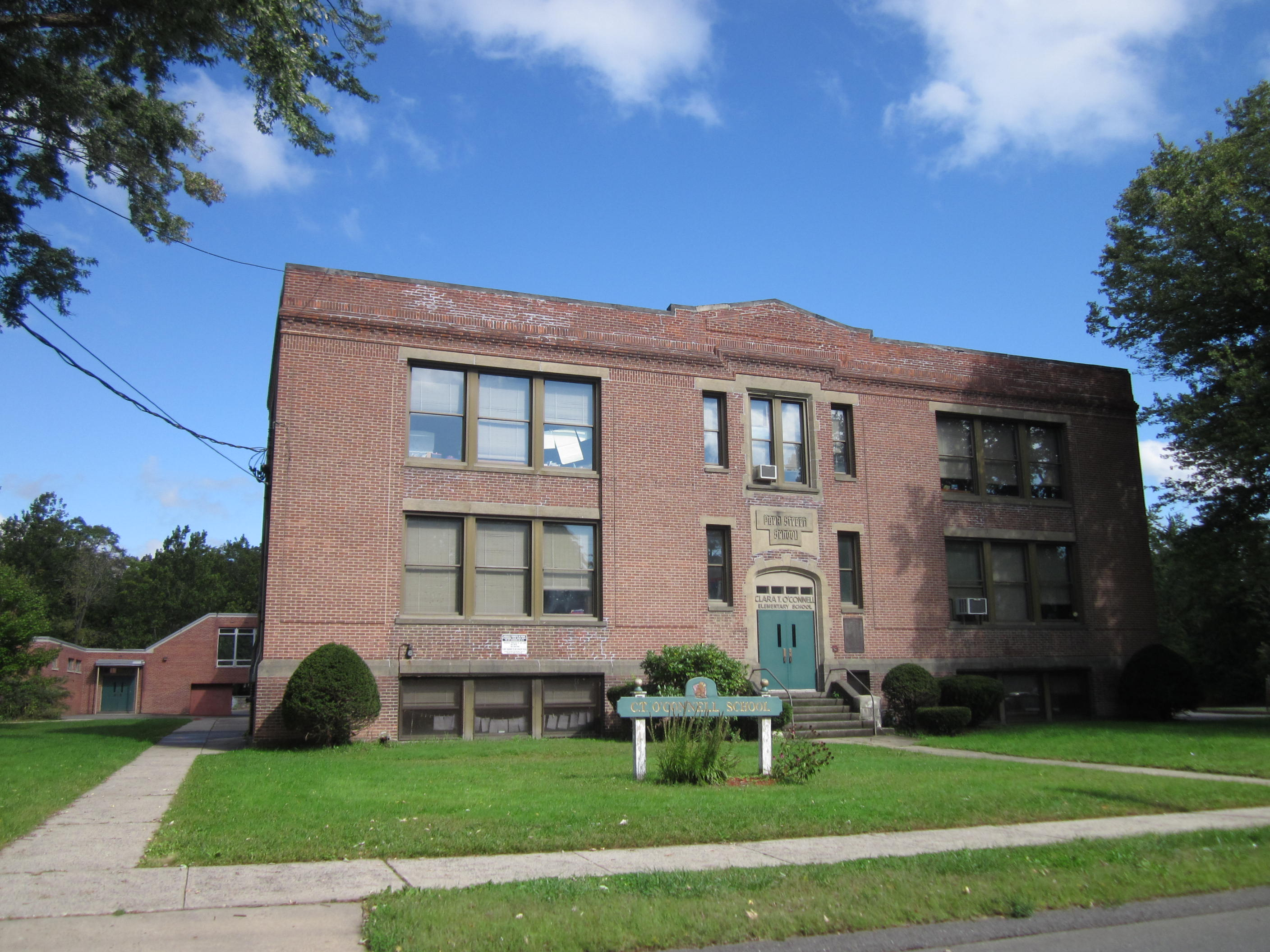

- Location within Connecticut Location within the United States
- Location: 122 Park Street, Bristol, Connecticut
- Coordinates: 41°40′20″N 72°57′16″W
- Built: 1914
- NRHP reference No.: 100000954
- Added to NRHP: May 8, 2017

The Clara T. O'Connell School is a historic school building at 122 Park Street in Bristol, Connecticut. Built in 1914, the school served the city until 2012. After a period of vacancy, the city sold it and the also-closed Clarence A. Bingham School to developers for conversion to senior housing in 2015.

The school was listed on the National Register of Historic Places in 2017.

1. Also in 2017 some delinquent set fire to the top. The whole building was not destroyed.

== See also ==
- National Register of Historic Places listings in Hartford County, Connecticut
