= Clarence A. Bingham School =

- U.S. National Register of Historic Places
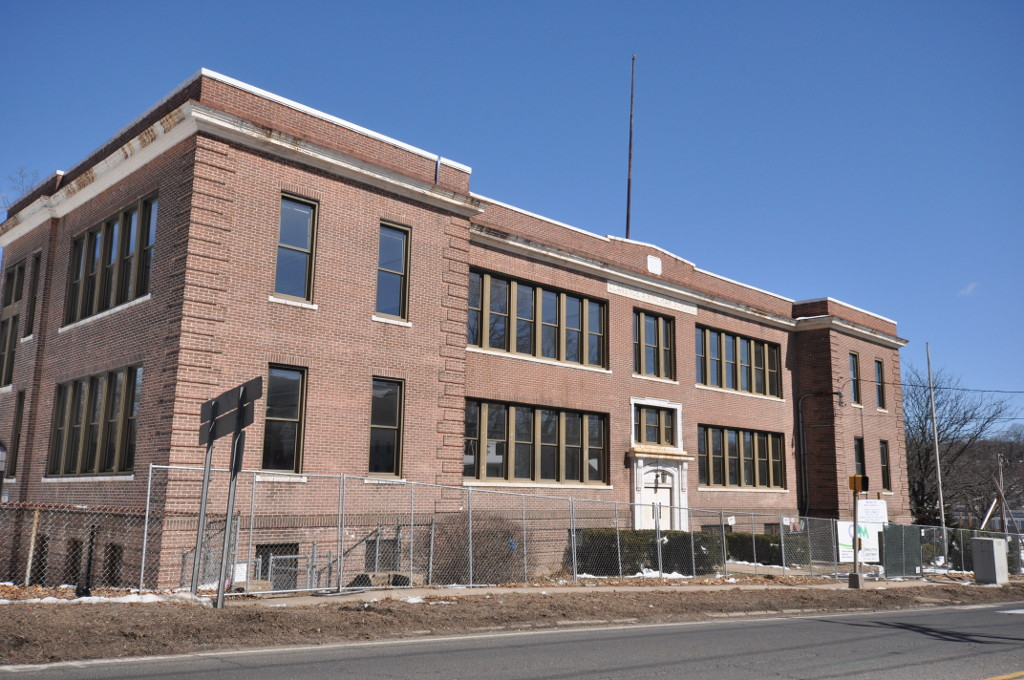

- Location within Connecticut Location within the United States
- Location: 3 North Street, Bristol, Connecticut
- Coordinates: 41°40′54″N 72°56′57″W
- Built: 1916
- NRHP reference No.: 100000953
- Added to NRHP: May 8, 2017

The Clarence A. Bingham School is a historic school building at 3 North Street in Bristol, Connecticut. Built in 1916, the school served the city until 2010. After a period of vacancy, the city sold it and the also-closed Clara T. O'Connell School to developers for conversion to senior housing in 2015.

The school was listed on the National Register of Historic Places in 2017.

== See also ==
- National Register of Historic Places listings in Hartford County, Connecticut
