= West Rock Ridge =

Mountain ridge in Connecticut, United States

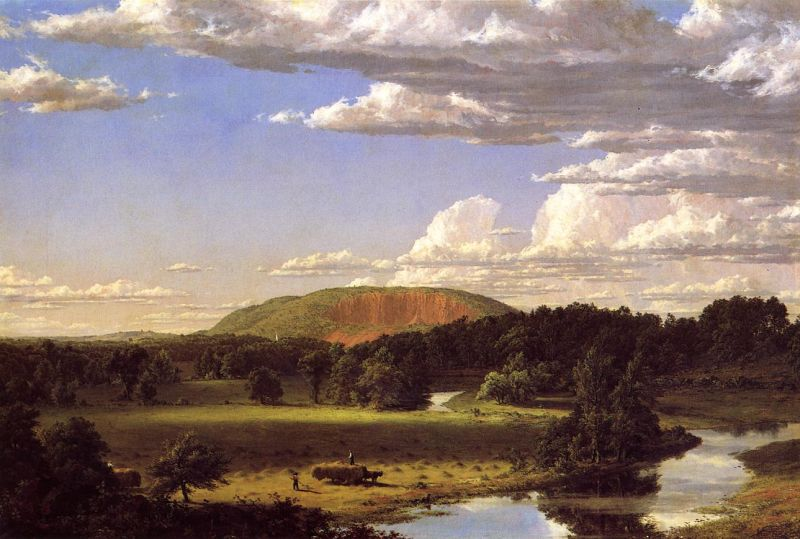
- West Rock, New Haven by Frederic Edwin Church, 1849

Highest point
- Elevation: 700 ft (210 m)ridge high point
- Coordinates: 41°24′56″N 72°56′17″W to 41°19′57″N 72°57′41″W

Geography
- Location: New Haven, Hamden, Woodbridge, and Bethany, Connecticut
- Parent range: Metacomet Ridge

Geology
- Rock age: 200 Ma
- Mountain type(s): Fault-block; igneous

Climbing
- Easiest route: Auto road

West Rock Ridge or West Rock of south-central Connecticut, is a 7-mile (11 km) long trap rock mountain ridge located on the west side of New Haven with a high point of 700 feet (213 m) at High Rock, also known as York Mountain. The ridge forms a continuous line of exposed cliffs visible from metropolitan New Haven and points west. West Rock Ridge is part of the narrow, linear Metacomet Ridge which extends from Long Island Sound near New Haven north through the Connecticut River Valley of Massachusetts to the Vermont border.

West Rock Ridge is popular for recreation and known for its microclimate ecosystems, rare plant communities, and expansive views from cliffs that tower up to 500 feet (152 m) above the surrounding landscape. The ridge is traversed by a network of hiking trails including the 7-mile (11 km) Regicides Trail, whose northern terminus begins as a spur off the 21-mile (34 km) Quinnipiac Trail.

== History ==
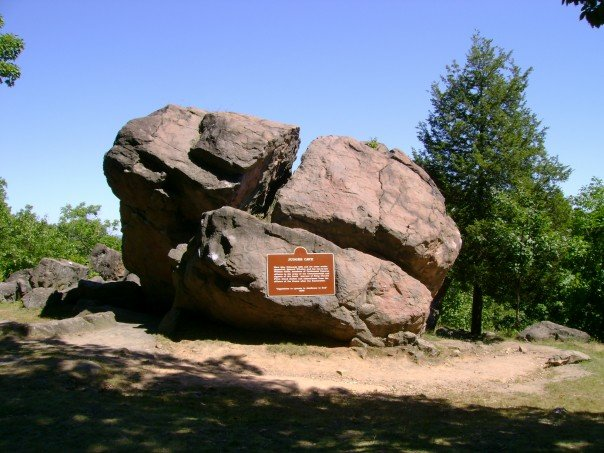
Judges' Cave

Judges' Cave and the Regicides Trail receive their names from judges Edward Whalley and his son-in-law William Goffe, who had signed the death warrant of Charles I of England in 1649. His son Charles II was restored to the throne in 1660, and the two judges fled to the area to avoid arrest. They hid in a boulder cave on the crest of the ridge intermittently over the summer of that year.

Nineteenth-century landscape painter Frederic Edwin Church portrayed the ridge in 1849, and George Henry Durrie painted it numerous times. The Connecticut General Assembly established the park in 1975 when the Connecticut Department of Environmental Protection (DEP) (now the Connecticut Department of Energy and Environmental Protection) purchased 600 acres (2.4 km^{2}) from New Haven. This act gives the DEEP the right of first refusal to purchase private land within the West Rock Ridge conservation area and to permit increasing the size of the park, which is about 1,820 acres (7.4 km^{2}).

== Geography ==
West Rock Ridge, located in the Connecticut municipalities of New Haven, Hamden, Woodbridge, and Bethany, is 1 mile (1.6 km) wide at its widest point. Notable peaks on the ridge include the high point, alternately called High Rock or York Mountain, est. 700 feet (213 m), at the north terminus of the ridge; the southern prominence with a summit parking lot, picnic tables, and observation area, usually referred to as West Rock, 400 feet (122 m), and popularly known as the South Overlook; and several knobs in between those two points. Judges Cave is also located near the southern end of the ridge.

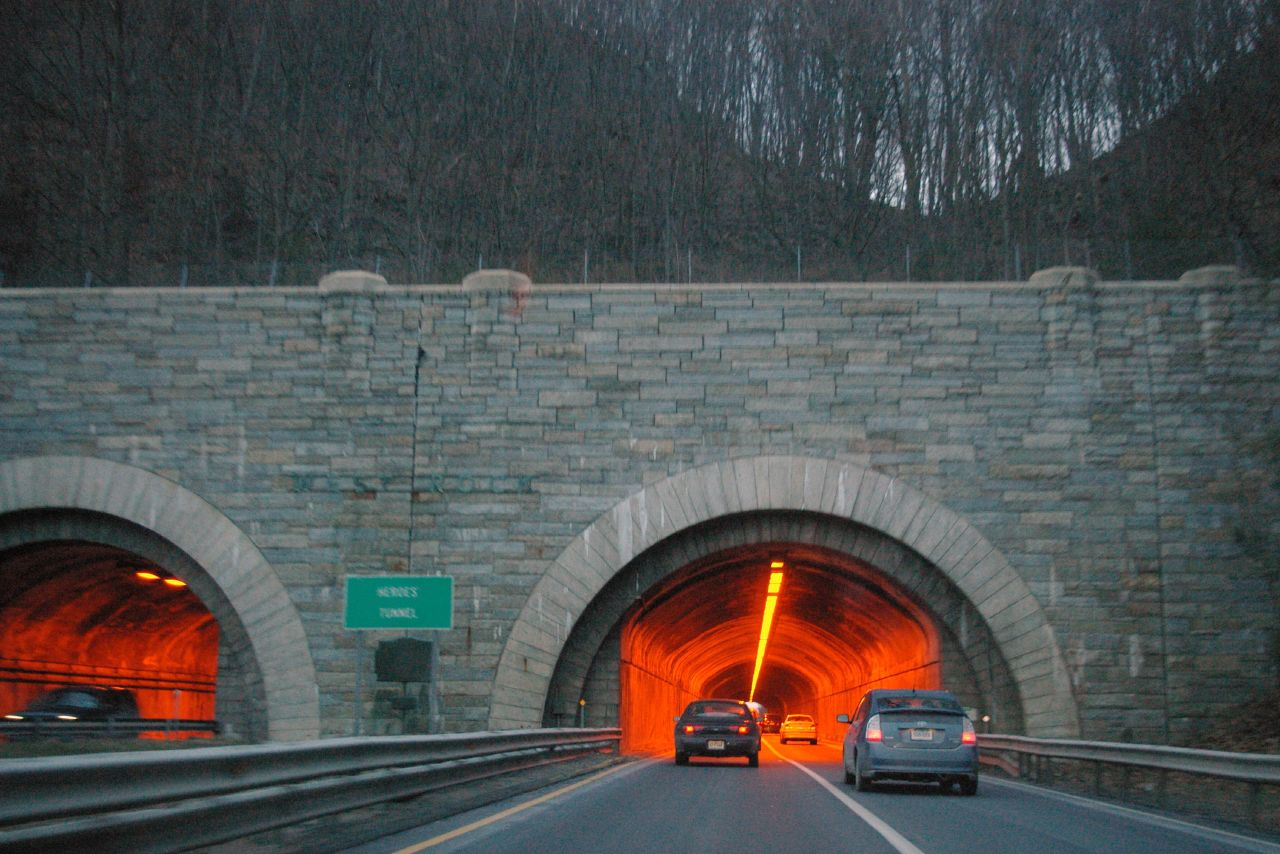
West Rock Tunnel

West Rock Ridge is an important aquifer. The ridge is bordered on the west by property owned by the South Central Connecticut Regional Water Authority; reservoirs include Lake Dawson and Lake Watrous. Konolds Pond, which is not used as a water source, is located just north of Rt. 15 in an industrial area. The main body of water inside the park is Lake Wintergreen, 44 acres (180,000 m^{2}), located east of the ridge. There is also a small fishing pond called Belden Brook Diversion Pond located near Mountain Road, and a flood control pond located at the north end of the park called Farm Brook Reservoir. The Wilbur Cross Parkway (Route 15) passes through the south central side of the ridge in the West Rock Tunnel, also known as the Heroes Tunnel. A network of suburban streets abut the ridge on all sides. The 1.6 mile long Regicide Drive leads from Wintergreen Avenue south along the ridge to the South Overlook with a spur to Judges Cave. The 5.6 mile long Baldwin Drive heads north from Regicide Drive, ending at West Shepard Avenue in Hamden. Several communications towers sprout from the ridge crest.

The Metacomet Ridge extends north from West Rock Ridge as Mad Mare Hill and Mount Sanford and northeast as Rocky Top and Sleeping Giant. East of West Rock Ridge, the Metacomet Ridge spreads out into a series of low, parallel ridges toward Saltonstall Mountain in Branford, Connecticut; the only noteworthy summit in between is East Rock which looms over New Haven from the north. The west side of West Rock Ridge drains into West River, then into Long Island Sound; the east side into Belden Brook thence to West River, and the north side into Mill River thence to New Haven Harbor and Long Island Sound.

== Geology ==
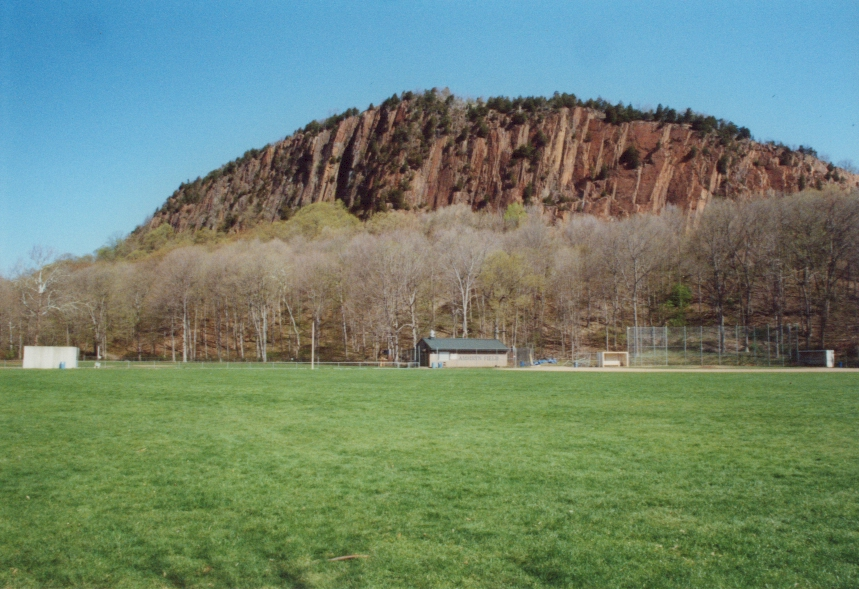
South prominence of West Rock from New Haven

The fault-block ridge of West Rock is composed of diabase (sometimes referred to as trap rock), an intrusive volcanic rock. Diabase is a dark colored rock, but the iron within it weathers to a rusty brown when exposed to the air, lending the ledges of West Rock Ridge a distinct reddish hue. The rock, which formed 200 million years ago during the late Triassic and early Jurassic periods, frequently breaks into octagonal and pentagonal columns, creating a unique "postpile" appearance. Huge slopes made of fractured rock scree are visible beneath many of the ledges of West Rock Ridge.

The ridge is the product of a huge feeder dike that supplied several massive lava flows hundreds of feet deep that welled up in faults created by the rifting apart of North America from Eurasia and Africa over a period of 20 million years. Erosion occurring between the eruptions deposited deep layers of sediment between the lava flows and around the dike, which formed sedimentary rocks. The resulting "layer cake" of igneous and sedimentary sheets was later faulted and tilted upward. Subsequent erosion wore away the weaker sedimentary layers a faster rate than the lava layers, leaving the abruptly tilted edges of the lava sheets exposed, creating the distinct linear ridge and dramatic cliff faces visible today along the Metacomet Ridge.

== Ecosystem ==
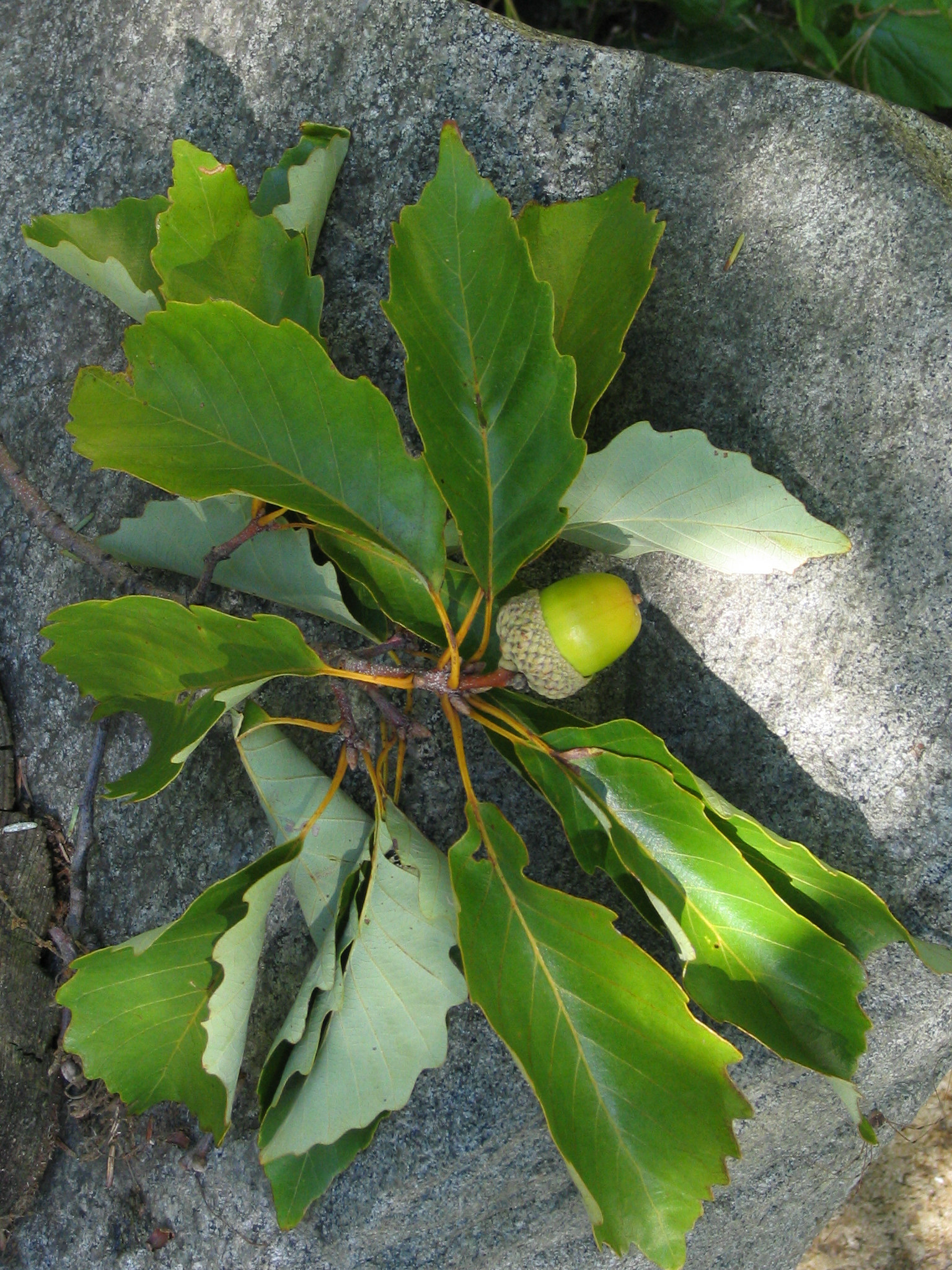
Chestnut oak

West Rock Ridge hosts a combination of microclimates unusual in New England. Dry, hot upper ridges support oak savannas, often dominated by chestnut oak and a variety of understory grasses and ferns. Eastern red cedar, a dry-loving species, clings to the barren edges of cliffs. Lower eastern slopes tend to support oak-hickory forest species common in the surrounding lowlands. Narrow ravines support eastern hemlock that block sunlight, creating damp, cooler growing conditions with associated cooler climate plant species. These hemlocks have suffered from infestation by the hemlock woolly adelgid. Talus slopes are especially rich in nutrients and support a number of calcium-loving plants uncommon in eastern Connecticut. Because the ridge generates such varied terrain, it is the home of several plant and animal species that are state-listed or globally rare.

West Rock Ridge is also an important seasonal raptor migration path.

== Recreation and conservation ==
West Rock Ridge is an outdoor recreation resource popular among residents and visitors of the metropolitan New Haven region. Views from the clifftops span New Haven, the rural landscape to the west as far as the Berkshires, Long Island Sound, and Long Island. Most of the ridge is within the public domain as state and town park land, conservation easement, and watershed property. Housing developments are prevalent on the northern slopes of the ridge but do not reach to the summit crest. The ridge boasts a substantial network of hiking trails and park roads, cliffs, rugged woodlands, scenic ponds and reservoirs, and waterfalls. Two noteworthy hiking trails cross the ridge: the Regicides Trail which traverses the summit crest from end to end, and the Quinnipiac Trail which crosses the northern summit of the ridge and extends north over Sanford Mountain and east over Sleeping Giant. Both are maintained by the non-profit Connecticut Forest and Park Association.

West Rock Ridge State Park occupies most of the ridgeline as well as the undeveloped Lake Wintergreen on the east side of the mountain. The park is open daily from 8 a.m. to sunset for a variety of recreational uses, including hiking, bicycling, fishing, car-top boating, horseback riding, dog walking, picnicking, and other passive pursuits. Regicides Drive to the South Overlook and Judges Cave is open daily to vehicle traffic from the Saturday of Memorial Day weekend through the last Sunday in October. Park access is free of charge for all users. Baldwin Drive is permanently closed to the public, but is used by maintenance crews to access the towers on the ridge.

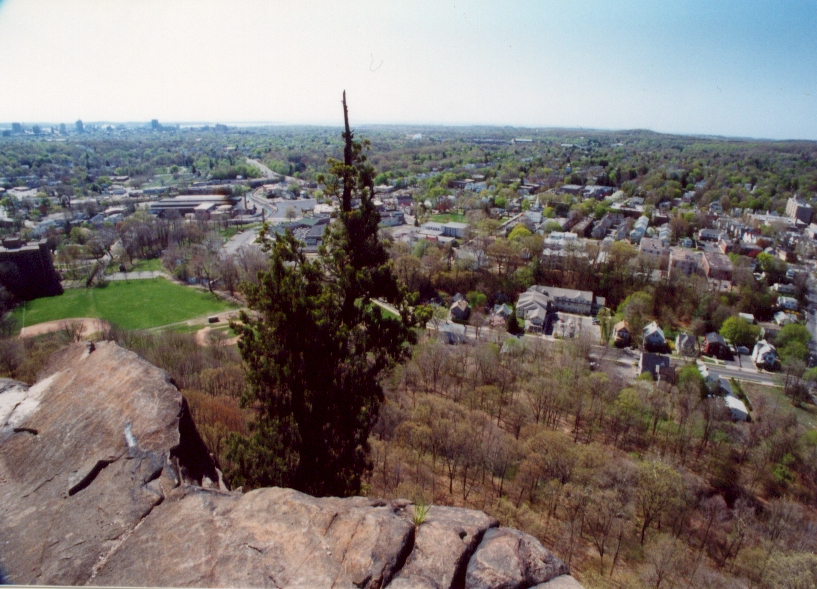
New Haven from West Rock

The City of New Haven owns and manages the 43-acre (170,000 m^{2}) West Rock Nature Center on the southeast side of the mountain. The center offers interpretive programs on local ecology, outdoor skills workshops, and features laboratories, gardens, interpretive trails, a visitor center, and classroom facilities, which are open for scheduled events. The center has been in operation since 1946 and is listed on the State Register of Historic Places by the Connecticut Historical Commission.

The town of Woodbridge owns and manages the Bishop Estate and Darling House Trails, a 160-acre (0.65 km^{2}) property on the west flank of the ridge. The property offers a network of trails, historic buildings, gardens, and bridges over the West River. Named for Thomas Darling (1720–1789), a Tory, he was acquainted with Benjamin Franklin, the estate is open to passive activities such as hiking, picnicking, and bird watching. Trails on the property link up with the Regicides Trail on the ridge.

The towns of Bethany, Hamden, and Woodbridge are also invested in the conservation of West Rock Ridge and its viewshed.

== Adjacent summits ==
Nearby summits include Mount Sanford to the north, Sleeping Giant to the northeast and East Rock to the east.

== See also ==
- Metacomet Ridge
- Adjacent summits:

North ↑

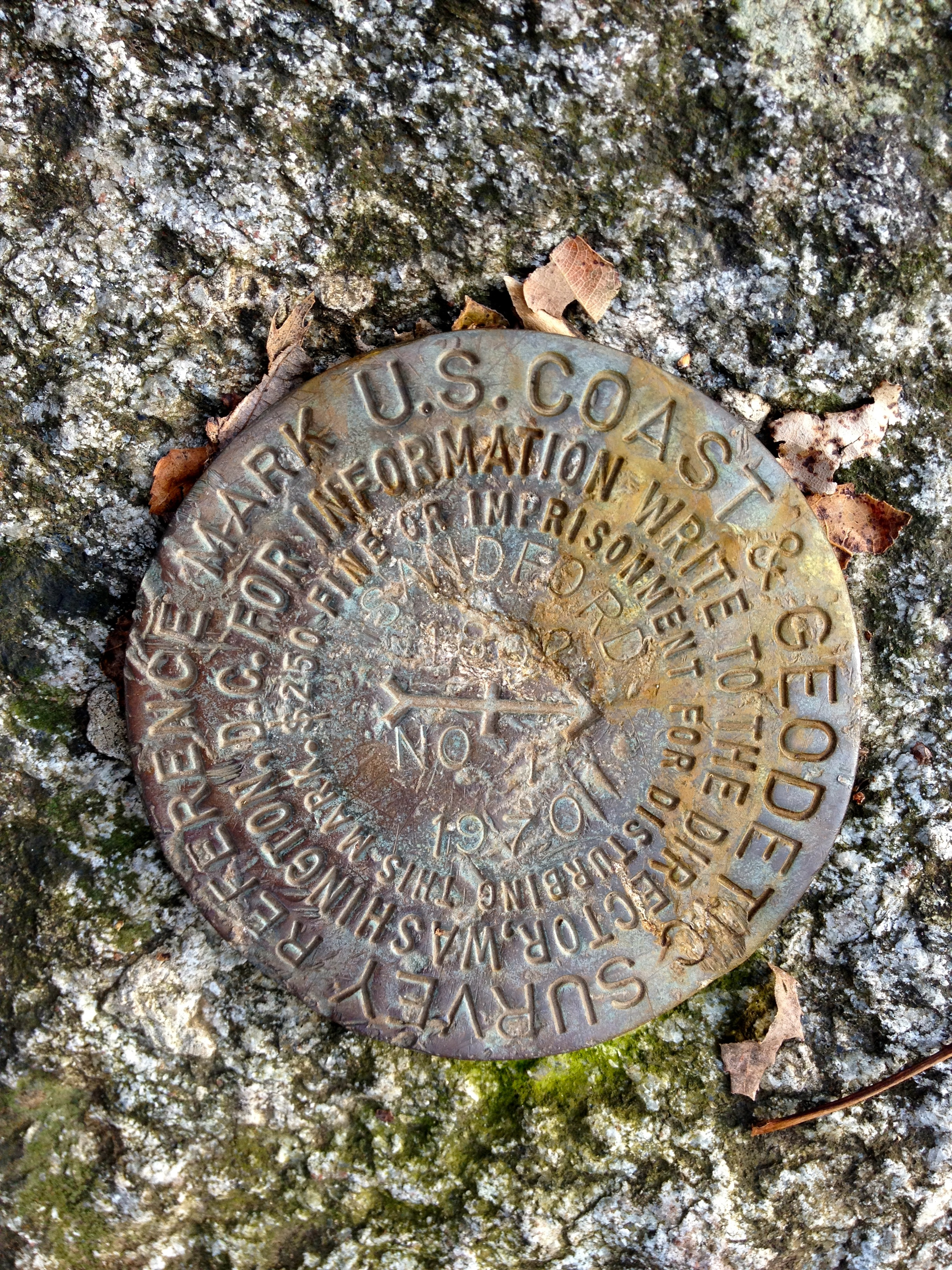
Mount Sanford

Northeast ↑

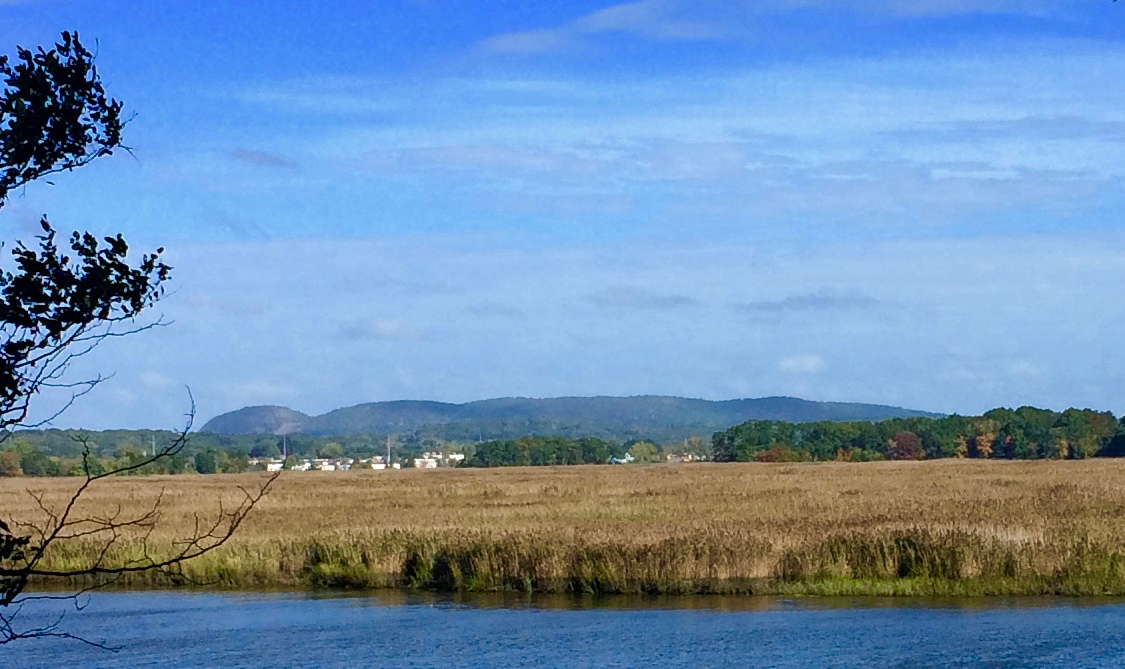
Sleeping Giant (Connecticut)

East >

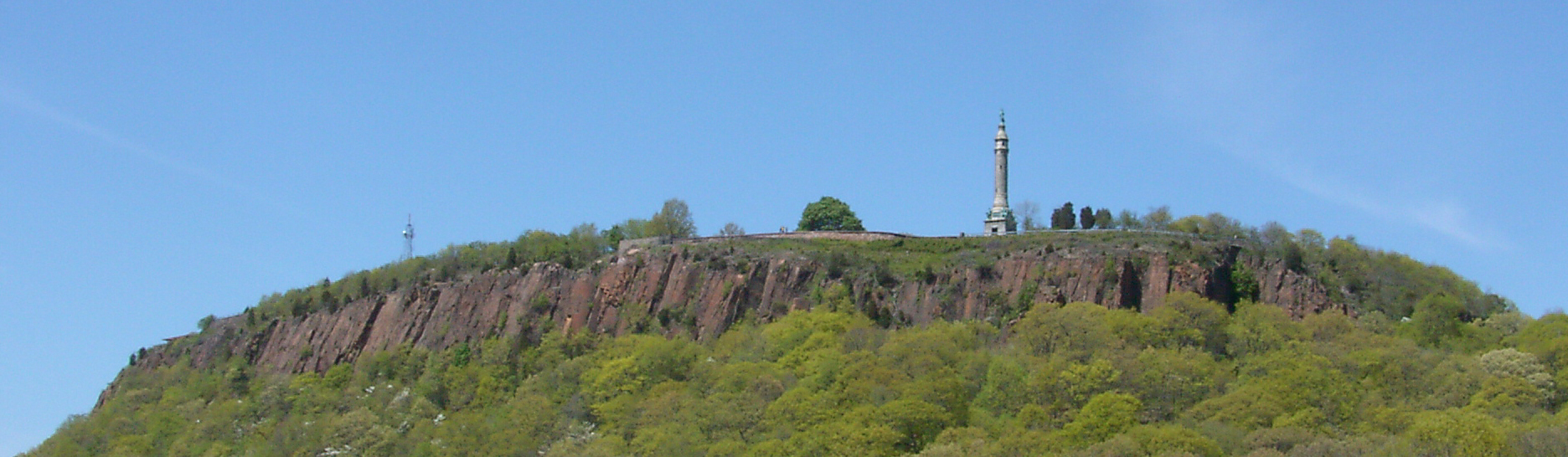
East Rock
