= Mount Sanford (Connecticut) =

Mountain in Connecticut, United States

Sanford Mountain
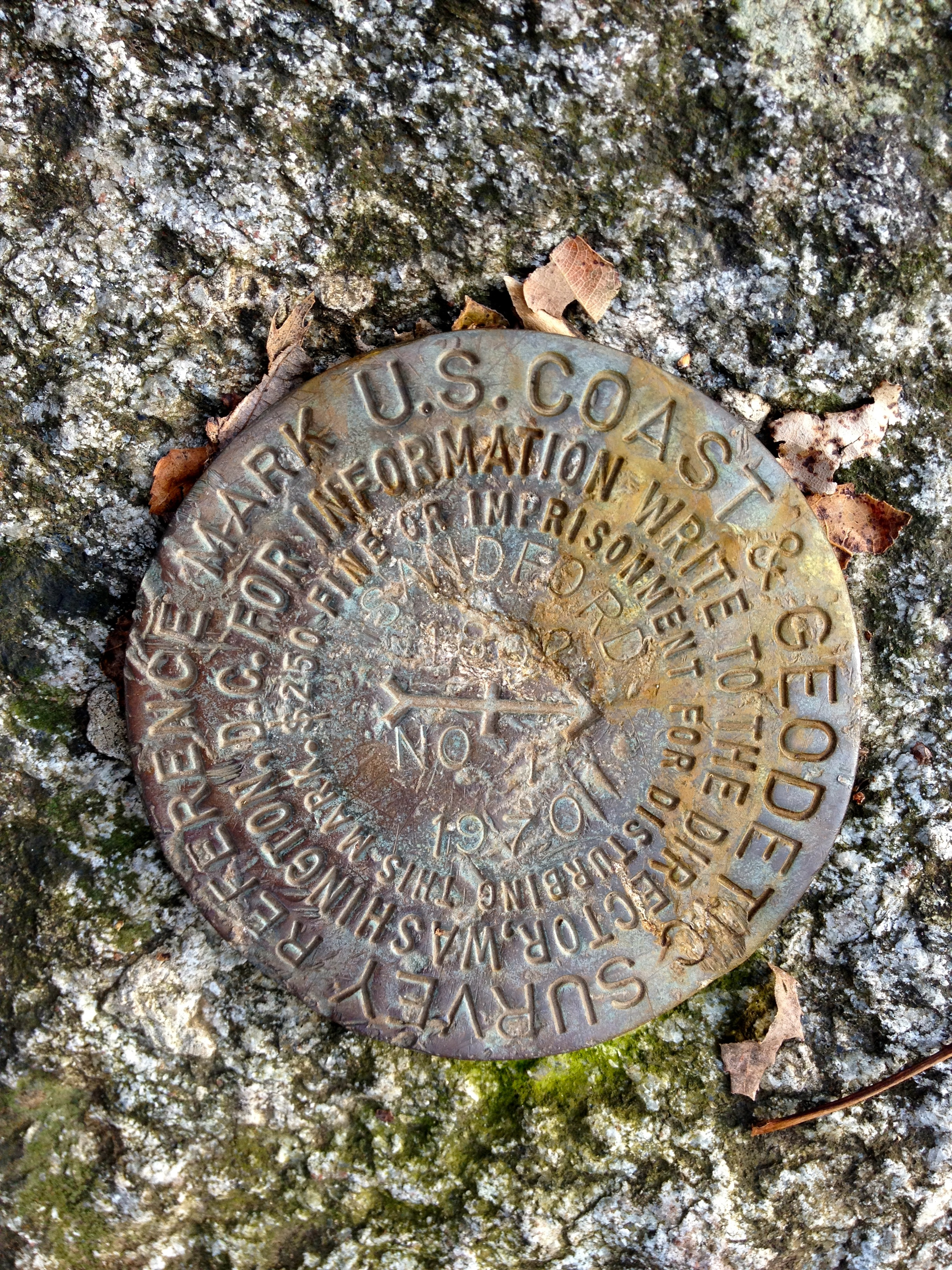
- Mount Sanford, Bethany Summit 1970 US Coast and Geodetic Survey Reference Mark

Highest point
- Elevation: est. 886 ft (270 m) ridge high point
- Coordinates: 41°27′42″N 72°56′55″W

Geography
- Location: Bethany, Hamden, and Cheshire, Connecticut
- Parent range: Metacomet Ridge

Geology
- Rock age: 200 Ma
- Mountain type(s): Fault-block; igneous

Climbing
- Easiest route: Quinnipiac Trail

Mount Sanford of south-central Connecticut, est. 886 feet (270 m), is the high point on a 2.25-mile (3.6 km) long traprock mountain ridge located 10 miles (16 km) northwest of the city of New Haven. Mount Sanford is part of the narrow, linear Metacomet Ridge that extends from Long Island Sound near New Haven, north through the Connecticut River Valley of Massachusetts to the Vermont border. The Metacomet Ridge continues north from Mount Sanford as Peck Mountain and south as Mad Mare Hill and West Rock Ridge.

== Recreation and conservation ==
The ridgeline of Mount Sanford is traversed by the 18-mile (29 km) Quinnipiac Trail; the summit of the mountain lies within the Naugatuck State Forest.

== Adjacent summits ==
Nearby summits include Peck Mountain to the north, Sleeping Giant to the southeast and West Rock Ridge to the south.

== See also ==
- Metacomet Ridge
- Adjacent summits:

North ↑
Peck Mountain
(no image)
Southeast ↑

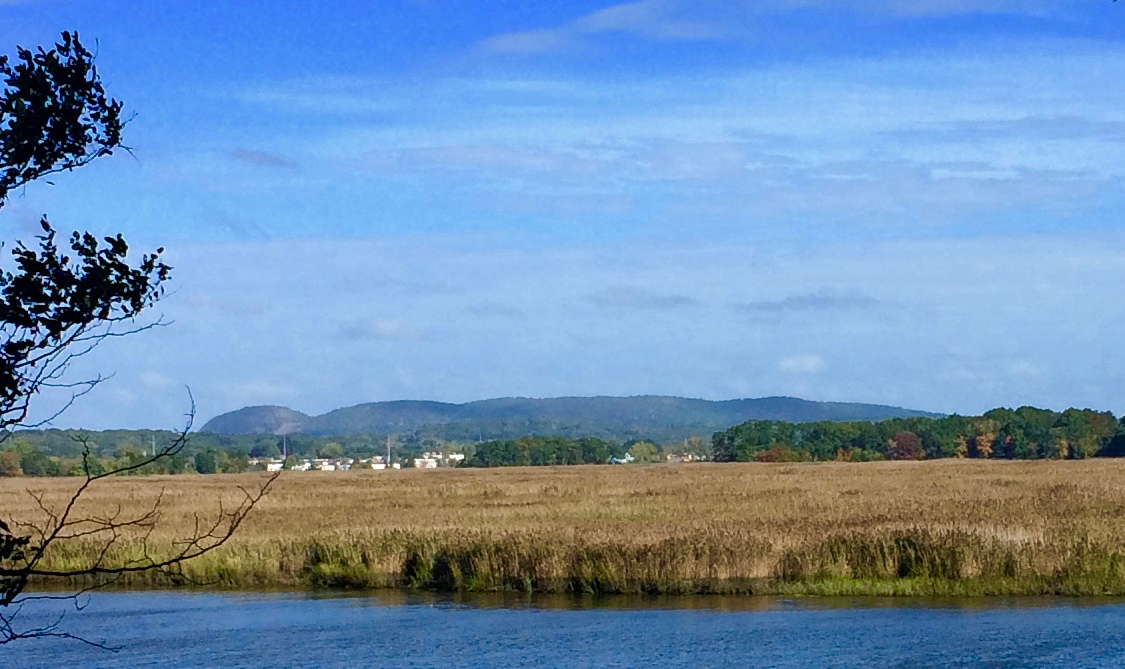
Sleeping Giant (Connecticut)

South

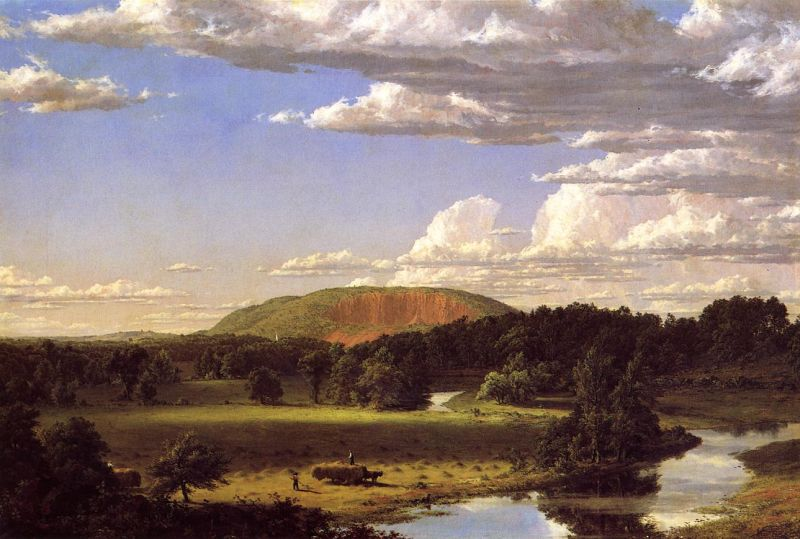
West Rock Ridge
