= Regicides Trail =

Hiking trail in Connecticut, United States

Coordinates: 41°22′22″N 72°58′11″W

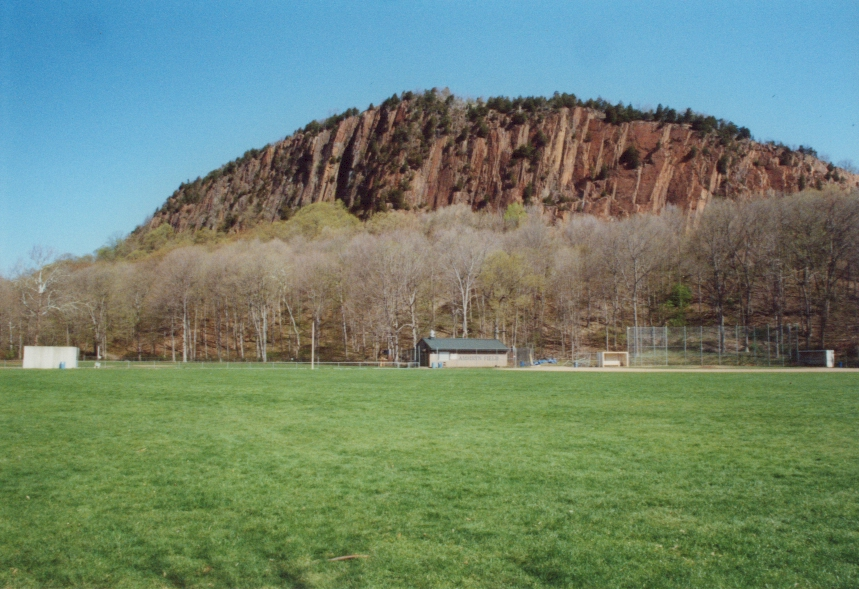
- West Rock
- Length: 7.0 mi (11.3 km)
- Location: New Haven County, Connecticut, United States
- Designation: CFPA Blue-Blazed Trail
- Trailheads: Quinnipiac Trail Junction in north, West Rock Ridge State Park South Overlook parking lot by pavilion in south
- Use: Hiking, snowshoeing, geocaching
- Highest point: Junction with Quinnipiac Trail on High Rock or York Mountain, 700 ft (210 m)
- Lowest point: Wilbur Cross Parkway Tunnel Roof, 330 ft (100 m)
- Difficulty: Moderate to Hard
- Sights: New Haven, Woodbridge, Lake Watrous, Lake Dawson, Lake Wintergreen, Konolds Pond, Long Island Sound, Judges Cave
- Hazards: Deer ticks, poison ivy, falling off cliff heights

Regicides Trail is a Blue-Blazed hiking trail, about 7 miles (11 km) long, roughly following the edge of a diabase, or traprock, cliff northwest of New Haven, Connecticut. It is named for two regicides, Edward Whalley and his son-in-law William Goffe, who signed the death warrant of King Charles I of England. Upon the restoration of Charles II to the throne and the persecution of the regicides, the pair hid in Judges Cave near the south end of the trail in 1660. The Regicides is widely known to be one of the most technical trails within the CT Blue-Blazed trail system.

== Description ==
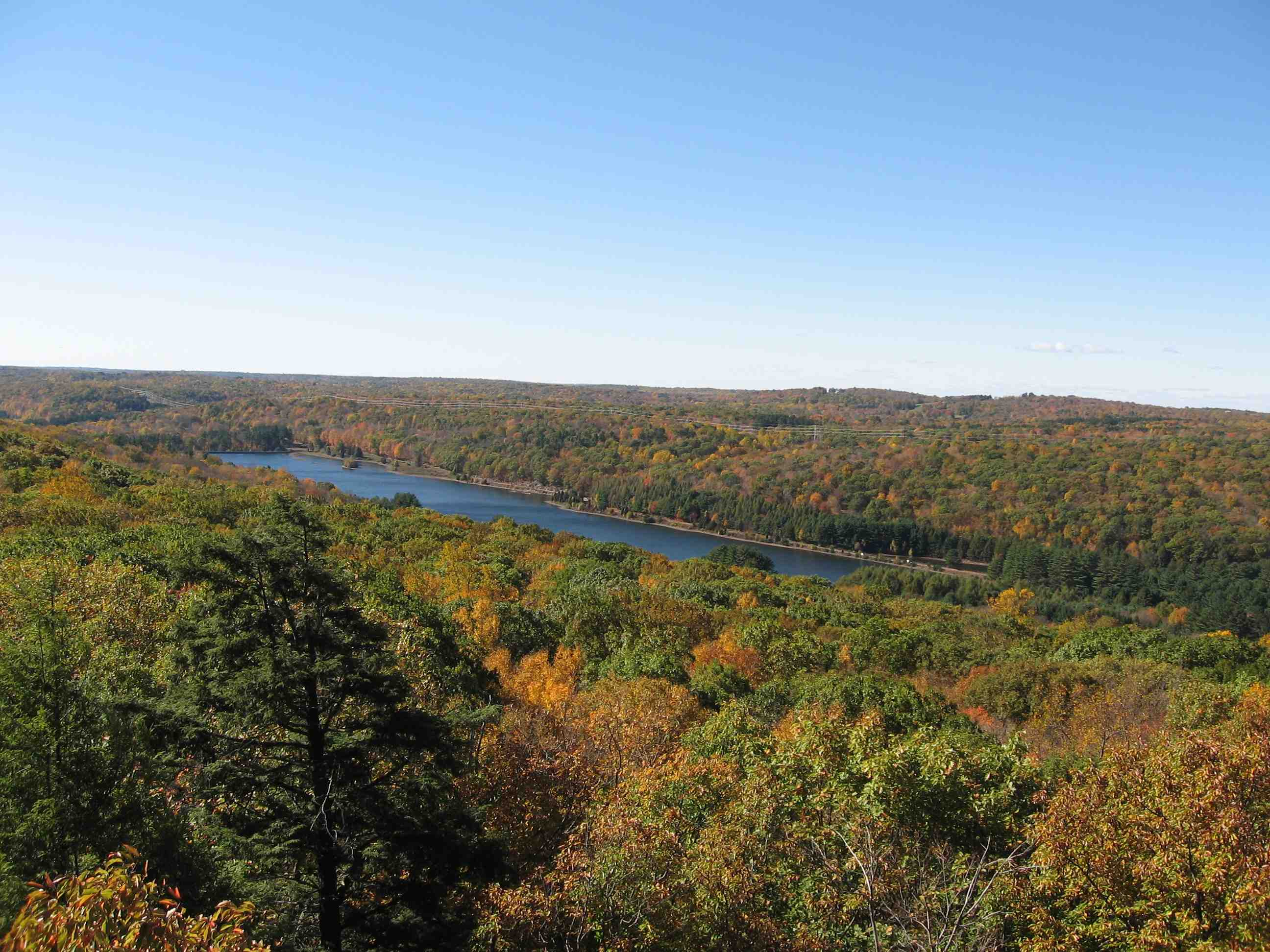
Lake Watrous in Woodbridge and Bethany, Connecticut is visible from an overlook on the Regicides Trail, 1.3 miles south of its northern junction with the Quinnipiac Trail.

The trail is a narrow footpath marked with blue blazes, sometimes rocky with difficult footing. It is roughly paralleled by Baldwin Drive, a paved road currently closed to motor vehicles, except for maintenance vehicles, named for New Haven native Simeon E. Baldwin, governor of Connecticut from 1911 to 1915. The trail is within the towns of New Haven, Hamden, Woodbridge, and Bethany, and entirely within West Rock Ridge State Park, but is maintained by a private organization, the Connecticut Forest and Park Association, in conjunction with the West Rock Ridge Park Association. At its southern end, the Regicides Trail terminates at the stone wall near a pavilion at the park's South Overlook, which has a panoramic view of South Central, Conn., including Sleeping Giant State Park, East Rock Park, New Haven Harbor, and the Long Island Sound. At its northern end, the Regicides Trail connects with the Quinnipiac Trail. Both trails are part of the state's system of "Blue-Blazed Trails" totaling more than 800 miles (1,300 km).

There are two connecting Blue-Blazed Trails to the Regicides Trail. The Westville Feeder, which starts at a footbridge over the West River off Blake Street in the Westville section of New Haven and extends for 0.7 miles, terminating with a junction at the Regicides Trail, just south of Judges Cave. The trail is blazed Blue-Yellow. The Sanford Feeder follows an abandoned town road, running from Brooks Road in Bethany to its junction with the Regicides Trail near Baldwin Drive. The Sanford Feeder is 0.6 miles and is blazed Blue-Red.

The Regicides Trail also connects to a series of other trails within the park that are not part of the Blue-Blazed system. These trails include the Red Trail that creates a trail loop within the park; the Green Trail, connecting down to the park's main entrance on Wintergreen Avenue; the Orange Trail, connecting to the south end of Lake Wintergreen; the Blue-White Trail, connecting to the northern end of Lake Wintergreen; the Purple Trail, connecting to Main Street in Hamden, and the Yellow Trail, connecting to Mountain Road in Hamden. The Regicides Trail has a connection to the Woodbridge trail system via the blue-yellow-blazed North Summit Trail, which intersects the Regicides, just west of Baldwin Drive near a U-shaped overlook. The North Summit Trail extends for 0.8 miles and intersects with the Bishop Estate and Darling House Trails, off Connecticut Route 69 in Woodbridge.

== See also ==
- List of regicides of Charles I
- Metacomet Ridge
- West Rock Ridge
- West River
