= Quinnipiac River State Park =

State park in New Haven County, Connecticut

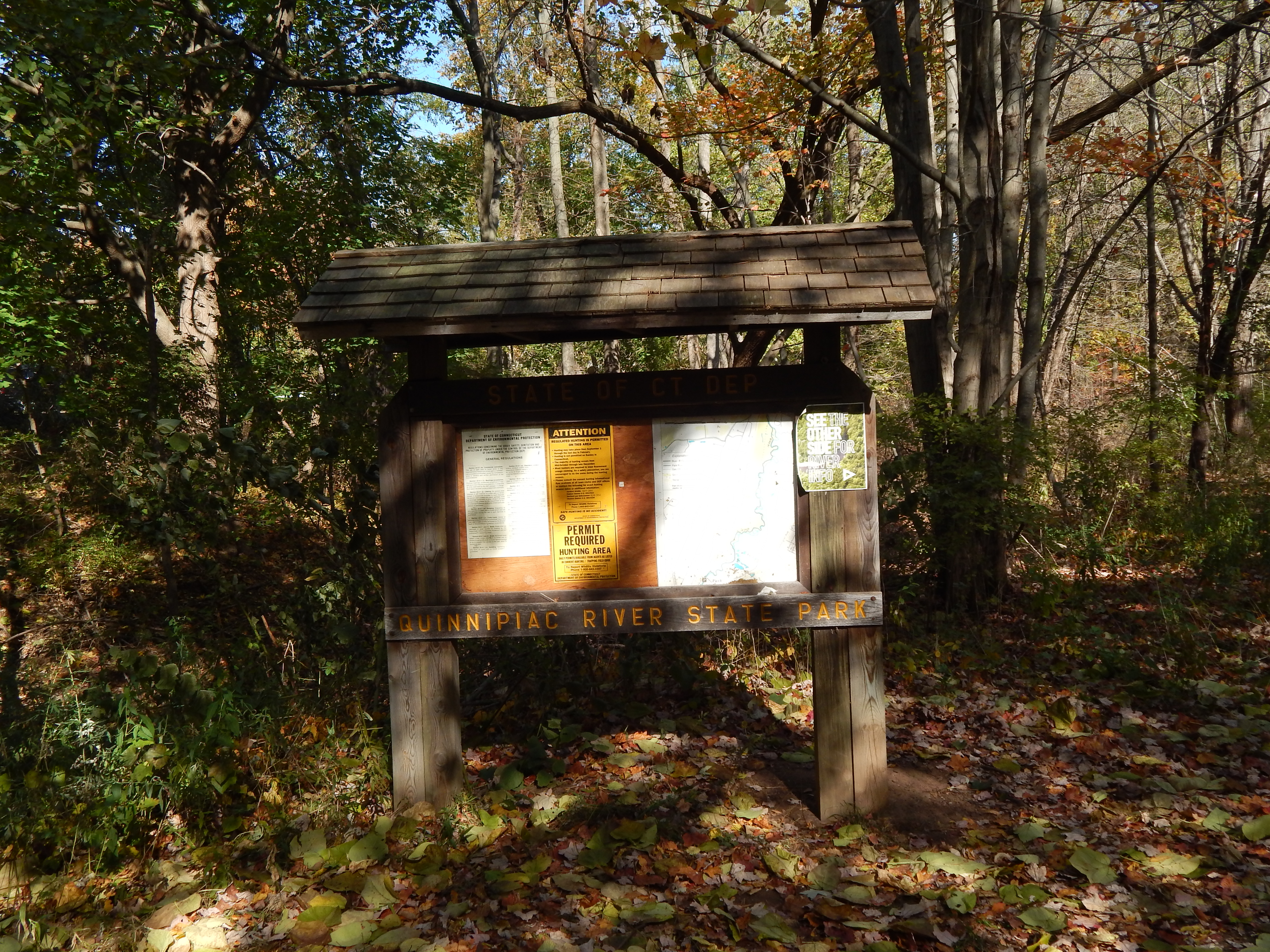
- Quinnipiac River State Park, October 2013

- Location within Connecticut Location within the United States
- Location: North Haven, Connecticut, United States
- Coordinates: 41°25′23″N 72°51′12″W
- Area: 323 acres (131 ha)
- Elevation: 20 ft (6.1 m)
- Designation: Connecticut state park
- Established: 1948
- Administrator: Connecticut Department of Energy and Environmental Protection
- Website: Quinnipiac River State Park

Quinnipiac River State Park is a public recreation area located in the town of North Haven, Connecticut. The four sections of the state park protect 6 miles (9.7 km) of the Quinnipiac River.

The park was traversed by a 4-mile (6.4 km) stretch of the Quinnipiac Trail.

This section of the trail through Quinnipiac River State Park has been officially abandoned, and is no longer blazed or maintained. Connecticut Forest and Parks Association, who maintains the CT blue blazed trail system, now recognizes the trail head at Old Hartford Turnpike as the southern terminus of the trail. It was deemed impractical to maintain the trail through the active floodplain of the Quinnipiac River. This section is not shown on current maps of the Quinnipiac Trail nor in the twentieth edition of the Connecticut Walk Book.

The park was created in 1948 on land left over from the construction of the Wilbur Cross Parkway. In addition to hiking, the park offers canoeing, fishing, and hunting. It is managed by the Connecticut Department of Energy and Environmental Protection.
