= West Rock Ridge State Park =

State park in New Haven County, Connecticut

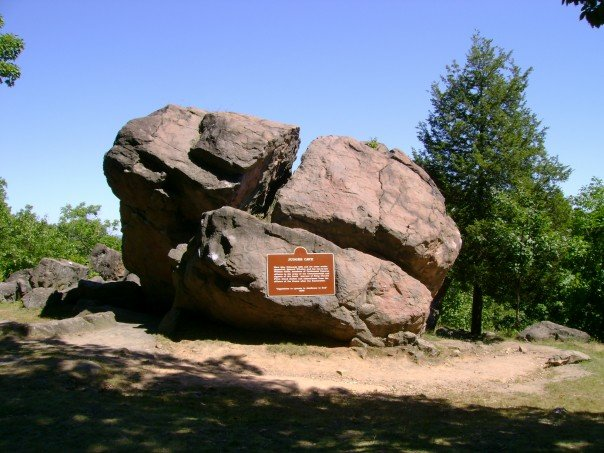
- Judges' Cave

- Location within Connecticut Location within the United States
- Location: Hamden, New Haven and Woodbridge, Connecticut, United States
- Coordinates: 41°31′32″N 72°41′47″W
- Area: 1,691 acres (684 ha)
- Elevation: 318 ft (97 m)
- Established: 1975
- Administrator: Connecticut Department of Energy and Environmental Protection
- Designation: Connecticut state park
- Website: Official website

West Rock Ridge State Park is a public recreation area located in New Haven, Hamden, and Woodbridge, Connecticut. The state park is named for the 400-to-700-foot (120 to 210 m) trap rock West Rock Ridge, which is part of the Metacomet Ridge extending from Long Island Sound to the Vermont border. The park's 7 miles (11 km) of open west-facing cliffs offer vistas encompassing Metropolitan New Haven and suburban towns to the west. The park includes Judges Cave, a colonial era historic site; Lake Wintergreen; and the 7-mile (11 km) Regicides Trail, part of the Connecticut Forest and Park Association's Blue Trail system. The park is part of a larger area of protected open space including state, municipal, and non-profit owned land.

== Geography ==
West Rock Ridge consists largely of diabase, much like its sister formation East Rock. It runs north-northwest out of New Haven and forms the boundary between the towns of Woodbridge and Hamden. It is bordered by Konolds Pond, Lake Dawson, and Lake Watrous on its western flank and by Lake Wintergreen on its eastern flank and is 6 miles (9.7 km) long. Heroes Tunnel was bored through West Rock in order to make passage for the Wilbur Cross Parkway.

== History ==
In the 17th century, West Rock served as the hideout for Edward Whalley and his son-in-law, Gen. William Goffe, two of the three "regicide judges" whom New Haven honors by streets bearing their surnames (41.313094°N 72.932920°W). They had fled England, anticipating prosecution under King Charles II in the execution of his father Charles I, to New Haven; the rock shelter hideout used by the two is now called Judges Cave. The Regicides Trail is also named with this history in mind.

The park originated in 1826 when Elijah Thompson donated 50 acres to create a New Haven city park. In 1975, control was turned over to the state by an act of the state legislature creating West Rock Ridge State Park. An act in 2003 gave right of first refusal to the Department of Environmental Protection to purchase private land for sale within the West Rock Ridge conservation area, with the object of increasing the size of the park.

== Activities and amenities ==
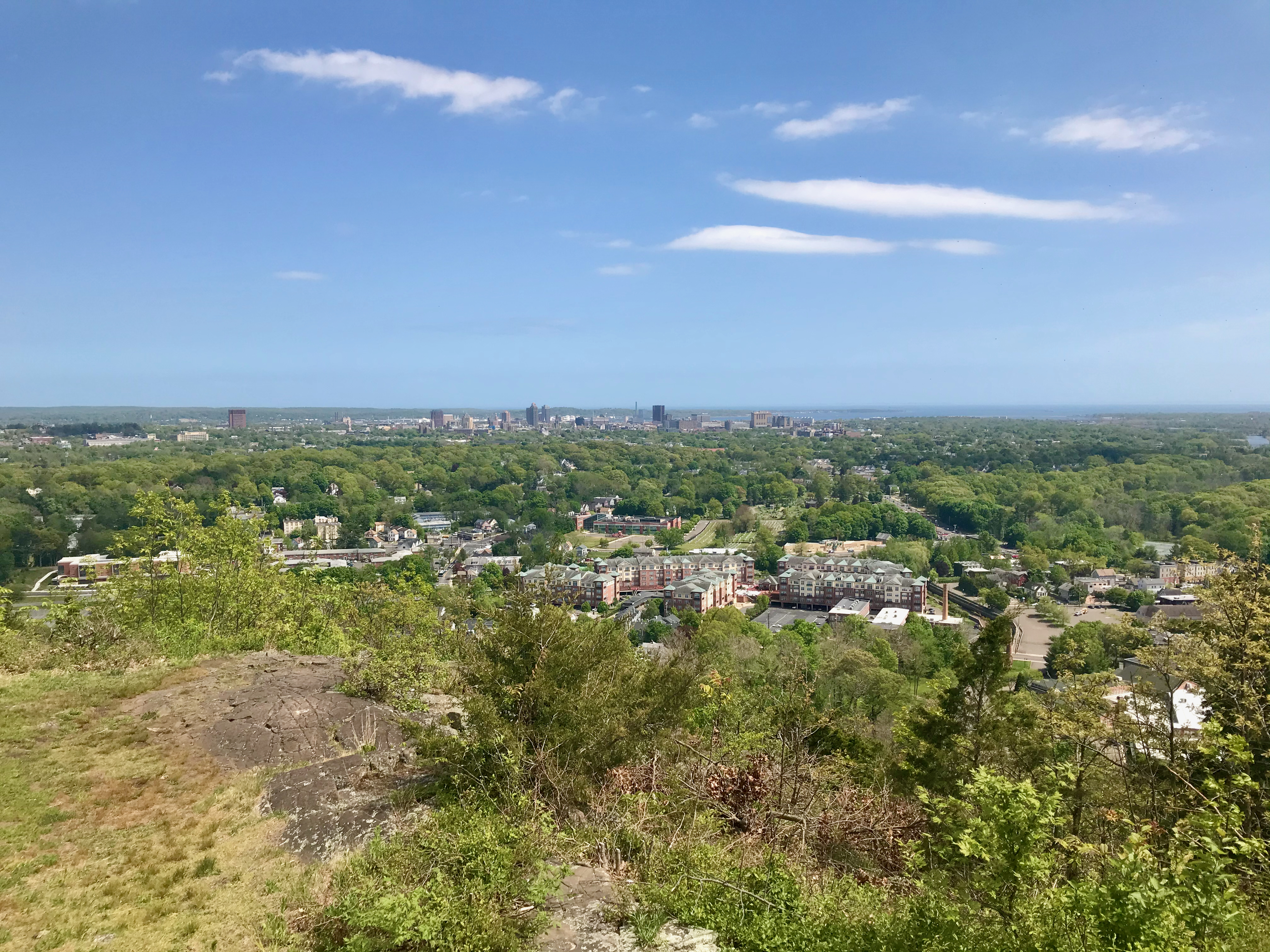
New Haven skyline and harbor seen from atop West Rock

Overlook

The South Overlook, located at the southern end of the park, offers views to the west, south and east, including Sleeping Giant State Park, East Rock Park topped by the Soldiers and Sailors Monument, the city of New Haven, including the harbor, Long Island Sound, and Long Island.

Trails

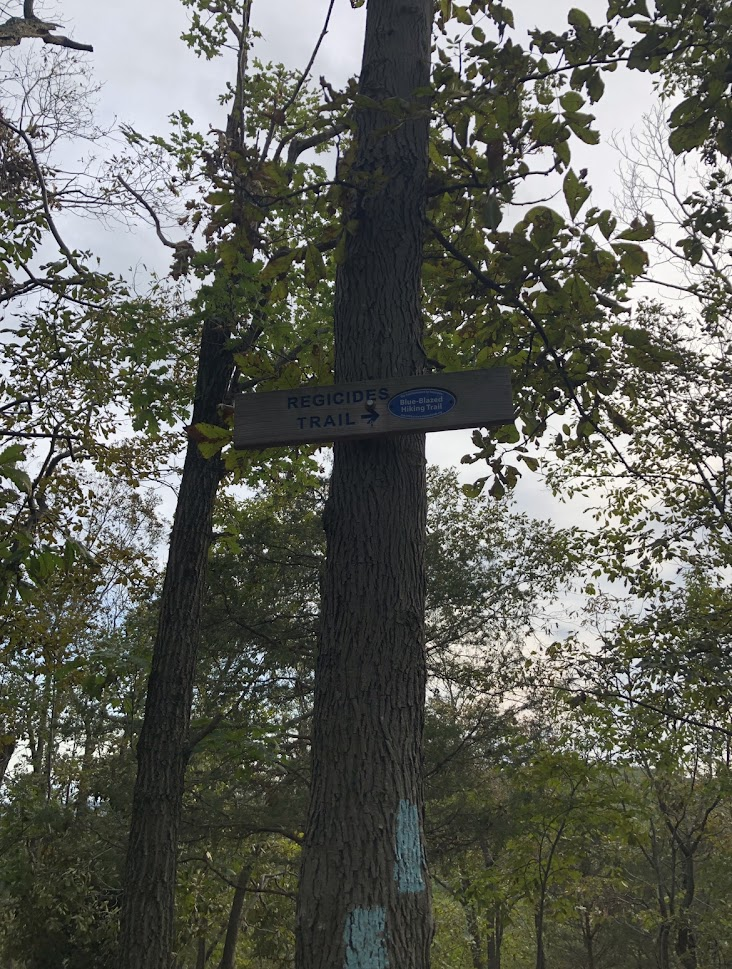
An example of a Regicides Trail marker (2021)

There are 21 miles (34 km) of blazed trails in the park. Primary trails include the 7-mile (11 km) Regicides Trail, which runs along the ridgecrest, the Red Trail which runs the length of the park at the east base of West Rock Ridge, and the White Trail, which passes along the shore of Lake Wintergreen. A network of shorter trails pass between these main routes. Other trails enter the park through adjacent municipal, nonprofit-owned, and private land. The park's main trailhead and parking area is located at Lake Wintergreen on Wintegreen Avenue in Hamden. Other trailheads and parking areas are located on Hill Street, Mountain Road, Connecticut Route 69, and within the park at Judges Cave and South Overlook.

Other

Other park recreational uses include hiking, bicycling, fishing, car-top boating, horseback riding, picnicking, cross-country skiing, and rock climbing. A park road to Judges Cave and South Overlook is open to vehicle traffic in season. Baldwin Drive, spanning the ridge crest north of Judges Cave, is open to non-motorized use only. No access fees are charged to use the park or park roads. Mountain bikes and horseback riding are permitted on certain trails. Park amenities include picnic tables and a pavilion at South Overlook.
