= Sleeping Giant (Connecticut) =

Mountain in the U.S. state of Connecticut

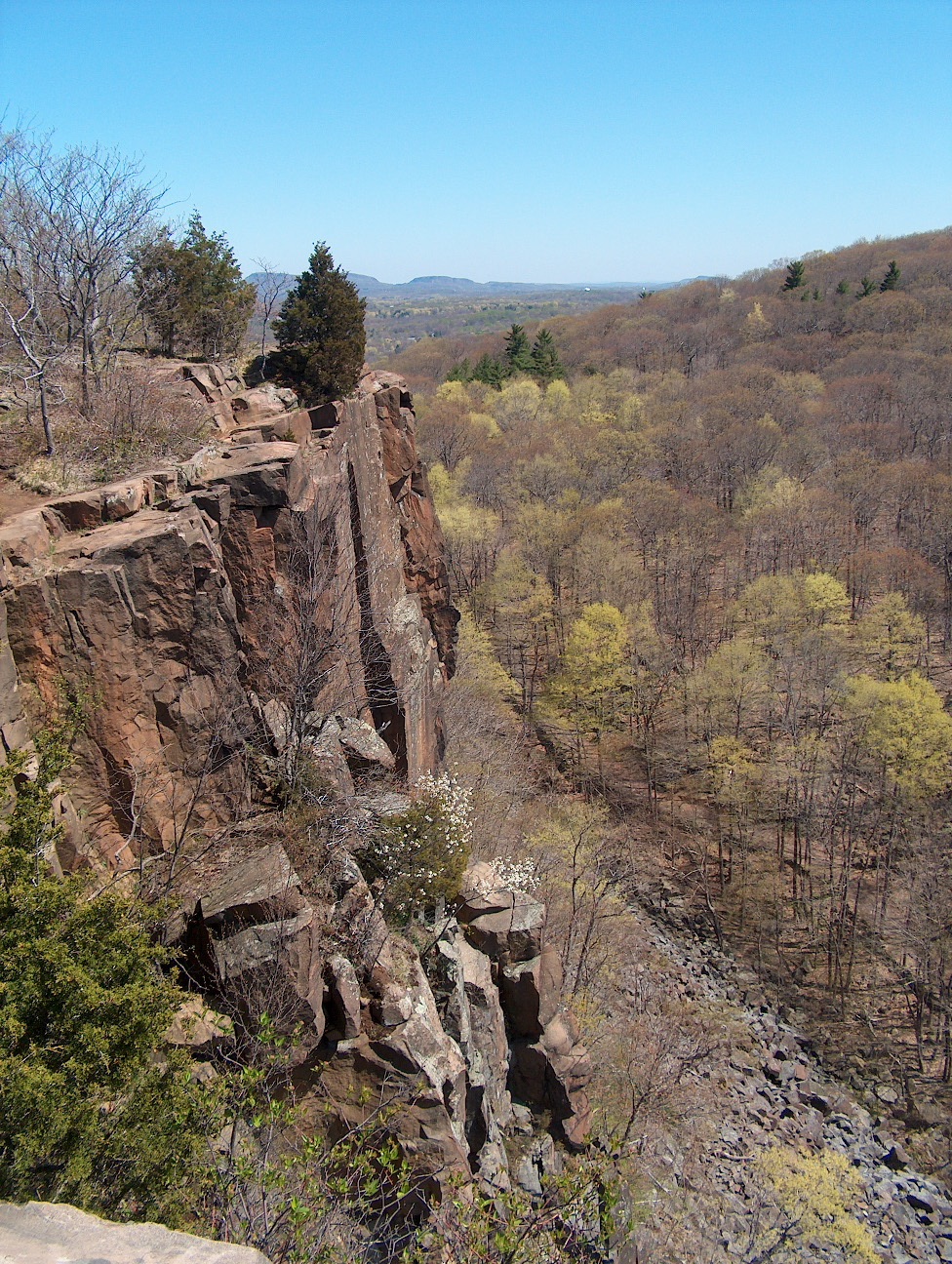
- View from the Giant's Chin

Highest point
- Elevation: 739 ft (225 m)
- Coordinates: 41°25′50″N 72°53′26″W

Geography
- Location within Connecticut
- Location: Hamden and Wallingford, Connecticut
- Parent range: Metacomet Ridge

Geology
- Rock age: 200 Ma
- Mountain type(s): Fault-block; igneous

Climbing
- Easiest route: Casual uphill walk (via Tower Path)
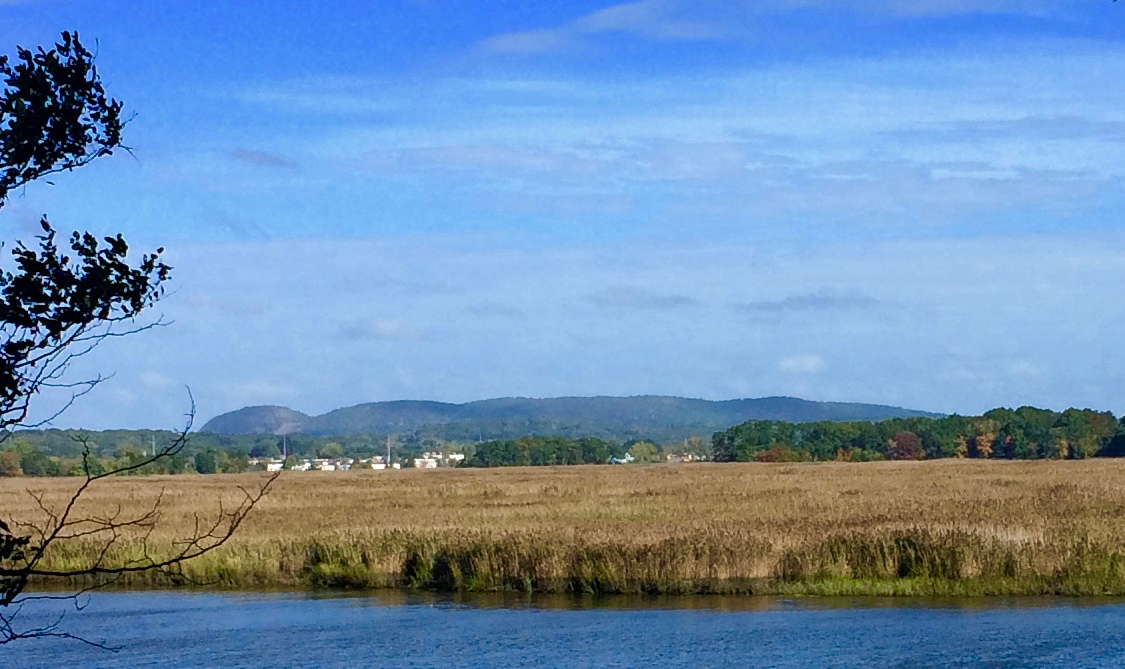
- The "Sleeping Giant" in profile view from the south
- Location: Hamden, Connecticut, United States
- Area: 1,465 acres (593 ha)
- Elevation: 696 ft (212 m)
- Established: 1924
- Administrator: Connecticut Department of Energy and Environmental Protection
- Designation: Connecticut state park
- Website: Official website
- Sleeping Giant Tower
- U.S. National Register of Historic Places
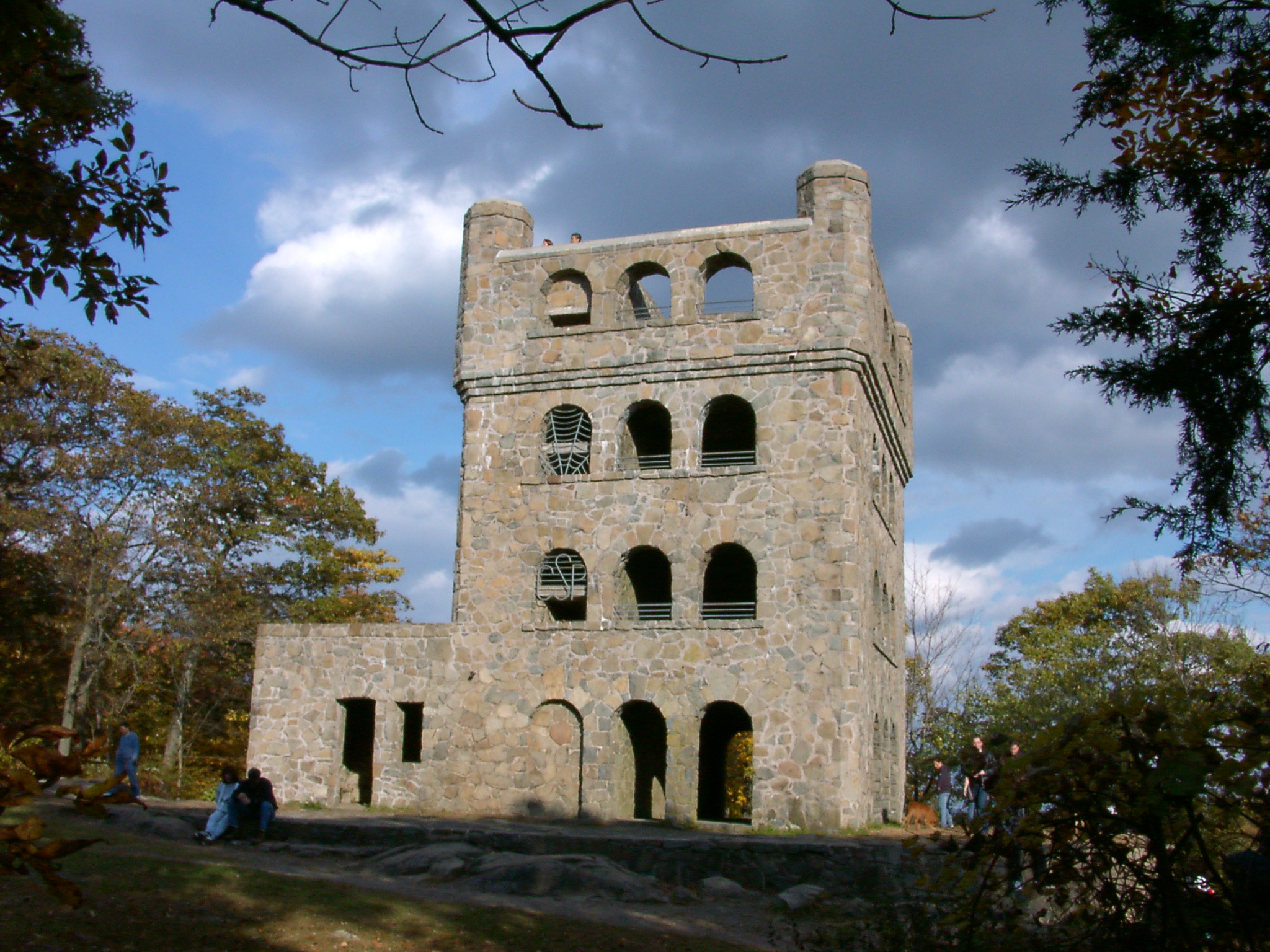
- Lookout tower at the summit of the Giant
- Location: Hamden, Connecticut
- Built: 1936
- Architect: Works Progress Administration
- Architectural style: Romanesque
- MPS: Connecticut State Park and Forest Depression-Era Federal Work Relief Programs Structures TR
- NRHP reference No.: 86001754
- Added to NRHP: September 4, 1986

Sleeping Giant (once called the Blue Hills and also called Mount Carmel), (Quiripi: Hobbomock), is a rugged traprock mountain with a high point of 739 feet (225 m), located eight miles (13 km) north of New Haven, Connecticut. A prominent landscape feature visible for miles, the Sleeping Giant receives its name from its anthropomorphic resemblance to a slumbering human figure as seen from either the north or south. The Giant is known for its expansive clifftop vistas, rugged topography, and microclimate ecosystems. Most of the Giant is located within Sleeping Giant State Park. The mountain is a popular recreation site: over 30 miles (48 km) of hiking trails traverse it including 5 miles (8 km) of the 23-mile (37 km) Quinnipiac Trail. Quinnipiac University is located at Mount Carmel's foot in Hamden.

== Geography ==
The Sleeping Giant, 2.75 miles (4.43 km) long by 1.75 miles (2.82 km) wide, is located in Hamden with its eastern edge falling into Wallingford. The Giant's profile features distinct "head," "chin," "chest," "hip," "knee," and "feet" sections topographically represented by traprock outcrops and ridge crests. The highest point is the Left Hip, 739 ft (225 m), followed by the Chest, 710 ft (220 m), and the Left Knee and Right Leg, 700 ft (210 m) each, and so on. The Giant's Head, 670 ft (200 m), is marked by a 400 ft (120 m) cliff. A stone observation tower located on the Left Hip, built by the Works Progress Administration in the 1930s, offers 360° views of the surrounding Mill and Quinnipiac River valleys. An old rock quarry, closed since 1933 and now part of the state park, has left scars on the Giant's Head.

It is part of the narrow, linear Metacomet Ridge that extends from Long Island Sound north through the Connecticut River Valley of Massachusetts to the Vermont border. The Metacomet Ridge extends west and south from Sleeping Giant as Rocky Top and West Rock Ridge. The west side of Sleeping Giant drains into the Mill River thence to New Haven Harbor and Long Island Sound; the east side into the Quinnipiac River, thence to New Haven Harbor and Long Island Sound.

== Geology ==
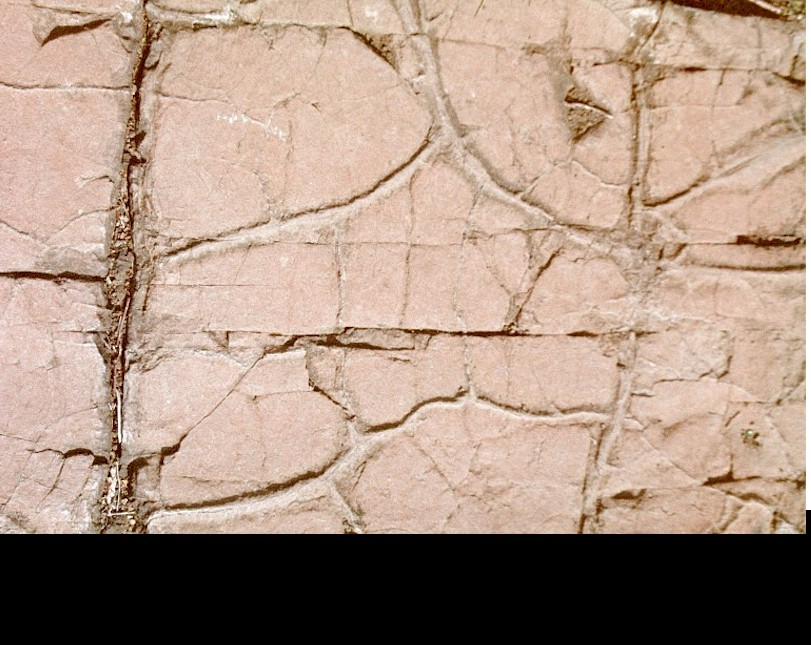
Close-up of traprock on the Sleeping Giant

Faulting

Sleeping Giant, a fault-block ridge that began its formation around 200 million years ago during the beginning of the Jurassic period, is composed of traprock, also known as diabase, an Intrusive Volcanic rock chemically identical to basalt, but its formation happens entirely underground. Over time, a series of volcanic faults caused the solidified diabase bed to sink unevenly, forming the distinct land features that we now know as Sleeping Giant. Over the course of tens of millions of years, the faulted diabase bed was slowly exposed as the soft sandstone was eroded away, leaving behind the much more erosion-resistant Diabase to form the peaks of Sleeping Giant. During the Pleistocene Epoch (2.5 million to 12,000 years ago, the world entered an Ice Age. Through a process of warming and cooling, glaciers periodically advanced and retreated across Connecticut. This movement deposited boulders, rocks and pebbled from much farther north, and these rocks can still be found today within the park. These glaciers also contributed to the unique profile of a sleeping giant that we see today.

== Ecosystem ==
Sleeping Giant hosts a combination of microclimates unusual in New England. Dry, hot upper ridges support oak savannas, often dominated by chestnut oak and a variety of understory grasses and ferns. Eastern red cedar, a dry-loving species, clings to the barren edges of cliffs. Lower eastern slopes tend to support oak-hickory forest species common in the surrounding lowlands. Narrow ravines crowded with eastern hemlock block sunlight, creating damp, cooler growing conditions with associated cooler climate plant species. Talus slopes are especially rich in nutrients and support a number of calcium-loving plants uncommon in eastern Connecticut. Because the ridge generates such varied terrain, it is the home of several plant and animal species that are state-listed or globally rare. Sleeping Giant is also an important seasonal raptor migration path.

== Mythology ==
According to Native Americans of the Quinnipiac Tribe, the giant stone spirit Hobbomock (or Hobomock), a prominent wicked figure in many stories (see Pocumtuck Ridge and Quinnipiac), became enraged about the mistreatment of his people and stamped his foot down in anger, diverting the course of the Connecticut River (where the river suddenly swings east in Middletown, Connecticut after several hundred miles of running due south). To prevent him from wreaking such havoc in the future, the good spirit Keitan cast a spell on Hobbomock to sleep forever as the prominent man-like form of the Sleeping Giant.

In the title story of Eleanor Estes's 1948 collection, The Sleeping Giant and Other Stories, the Giant decides to get up and leave. The Native American legend is retold (with a few liberties) by Jason J. Marchi in his illustrated children's book The Legend of Hobbomock: The Sleeping Giant, published in 2015.

== History ==
During the mid-19th century, spurred by the painters of the Hudson River School and transcendentalist philosophers such as Ralph Waldo Emerson and Henry David Thoreau, an interest in mountains as a respite from industrialization and urbanization took hold in New England. Summer cottages were built on the Sleeping Giant and many other locations on the Metacomet Ridge. In 1888, John H. Dickerman built a carriage road on the Giant and opened what he called Blue Hills Park. He held picnics with ice cream on the ledges for local residents.

Conservation of the Giant began in 1924 with the creation of the Sleeping Giant Park Association (SGPA) by a group of local residents concerned with ongoing traprock quarrying on the Giant's head. A cottage owner, Judge Willis Cook, had leased his property to the Mount Carmel Traprock Company for the purpose of quarrying traprock for building materials. The blasting away of what was a beloved landscape feature resulted in public outrage, well reported by local newspapers at the time. Under the leadership of James W. Toumey, a Yale University forestry professor, the SGPA undertook a ten-year struggle with the traprock operation. The property was purchased by the SGPA in 1933, during the Great Depression, for $30,000; the money was raised through private donations and the property became the Sleeping Giant State Park. (Note: A complete history of the Giant has been published in Nancy Davis Sachse's book Born Among the Hills – The Sleeping Giant Story.)

Sleeping Giant State Park was created in 1924, when the SGPA donated 600 acres to the Park and Forest Commission. The state added an additional 65 acres that year, purchased at a cost of $7025.00.

In 1936, the Sleeping Giant Tower was built at the top by the Works Progress Administration. It was listed on the National Register of Historic Places in 1986 as part of the Connecticut State Park and Forest Depression-Era Federal Work Relief Programs Structures.

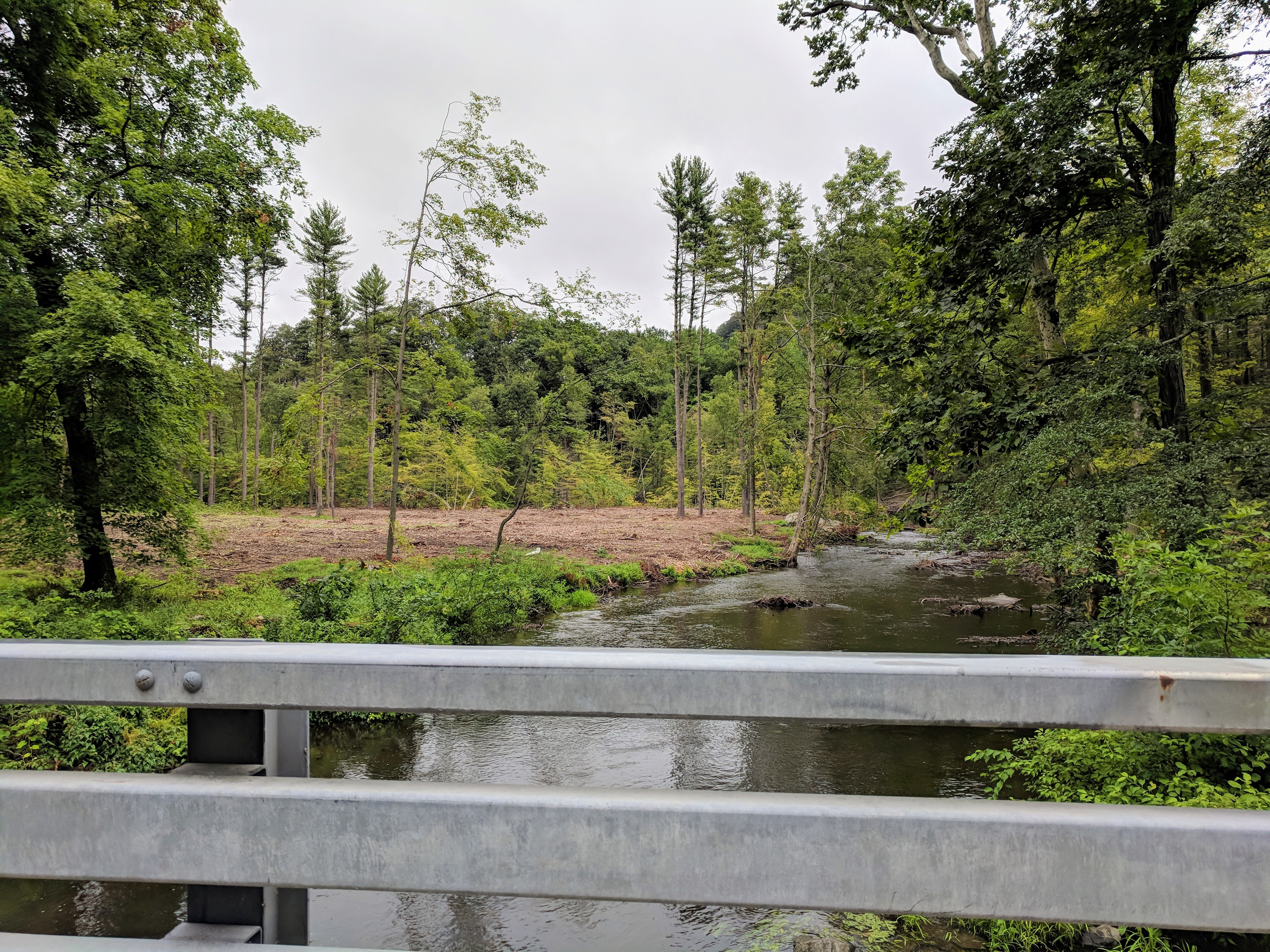
Damage around the southern part of the Blue Trail that follows the Mill River.

On May 15, 2018, a 100-mph microburst caused extensive damage to the park, forcing its closure. Ben Lambert of the New Haven Register noted that, "The tops of trees around the park entrance looked as if they had been purposefully shorn away." After more than a year of clean up, much done by or coordinated by the Sleeping Giant Park Association, the park reopened on June 14, 2019. According to the Hartford Courant, officials from the state estimated restoration cost $735,000.

== Recreation ==
Sleeping Giant State Park offers clifftop views of much of New Haven County, some of Hartford County and, atmospheric conditions permitting, across Long Island Sound to the Shoreham area on Long Island.

The state park is open until sunset year-round. Activities permitted on the Giant include hiking, rock climbing, snowshoeing, picnicking, bird watching, and other passive pursuits. Trails specifically designed for horseback riding and cross-country skiing are located on the lower reaches of the Giant, and fishing is allowed in the abutting Mill River. Rock climbing, closed on the Giant in 1953 because of accidents, was permitted as of 2015. Youth camping only is allowed on the Giant (by permit). Seasonal facilities include restrooms, a picnic shelter, and picnic tables. The 23-mile (37 km) Quinnipiac Trail—the oldest trail in the 700-mile (1,100 km) blue blazed trail system managed by the Connecticut Forest and Park Association—traverses the length of the Giant from the Quinnipiac River west over the Giant's high points to the Mill River then continues north over West Rock Ridge and Mount Sanford.

== Conservation ==
Most, but not all, of the Sleeping Giant has been conserved. The trails and facilities on Sleeping Giant are collaboratively maintained by the Sleeping Giant Park Association and the State of Connecticut, with the bulk of the trail maintenance done by the association. Sleeping Giant State Park encompasses 1,500 acres (6.1 km^{2}); the SGPA remains active in securing additional parcels to add to the property. The SGPA has also been instrumental in defeating attempts to log the Giant, build communications towers on its summits, and close the state park altogether. SGPA runs a regular recreational and interpretive hikes on the Giant and volunteer trail maintenance programs. The Connecticut Forest and Park Association also has a working investment in the conservation of the Giant and trail building on it. The trail system of the park is also designated as a National Recreation Trail.

== See also ==
- Metacomet Ridge
- National Register of Historic Places listings in New Haven County, Connecticut
- Old Man of Hoy, a rock pillar off Scotland that resembles a standing man
- Old Man of the Mountain, a face that used to stand out from a cliff in New Hampshire
- Quinnipiac River
- Quinnipiac Trail
- Sleeping Giant (Kauai)
- Sleeping Giant (Ontario)
- West Rock Ridge State Park
- Adjacent summits:

↑ North

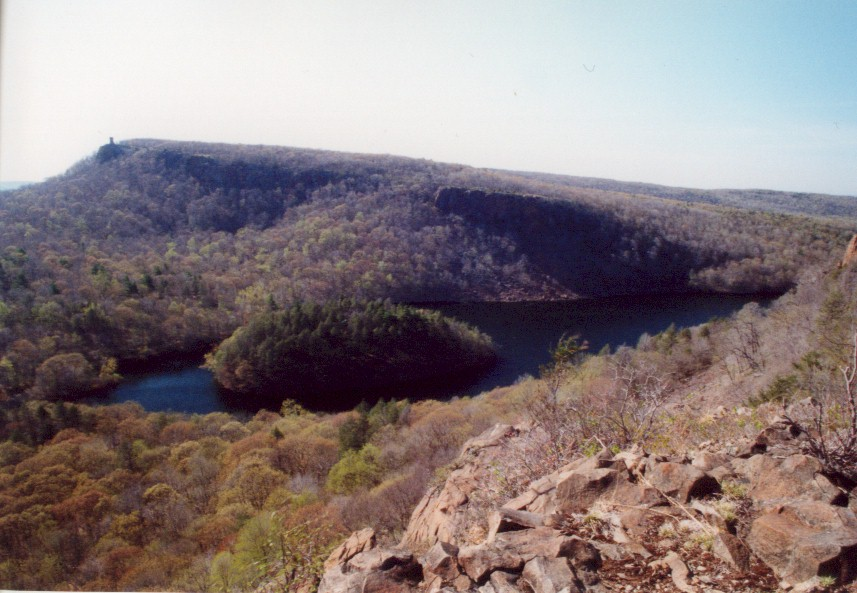
Hanging Hills

↑ Northwest

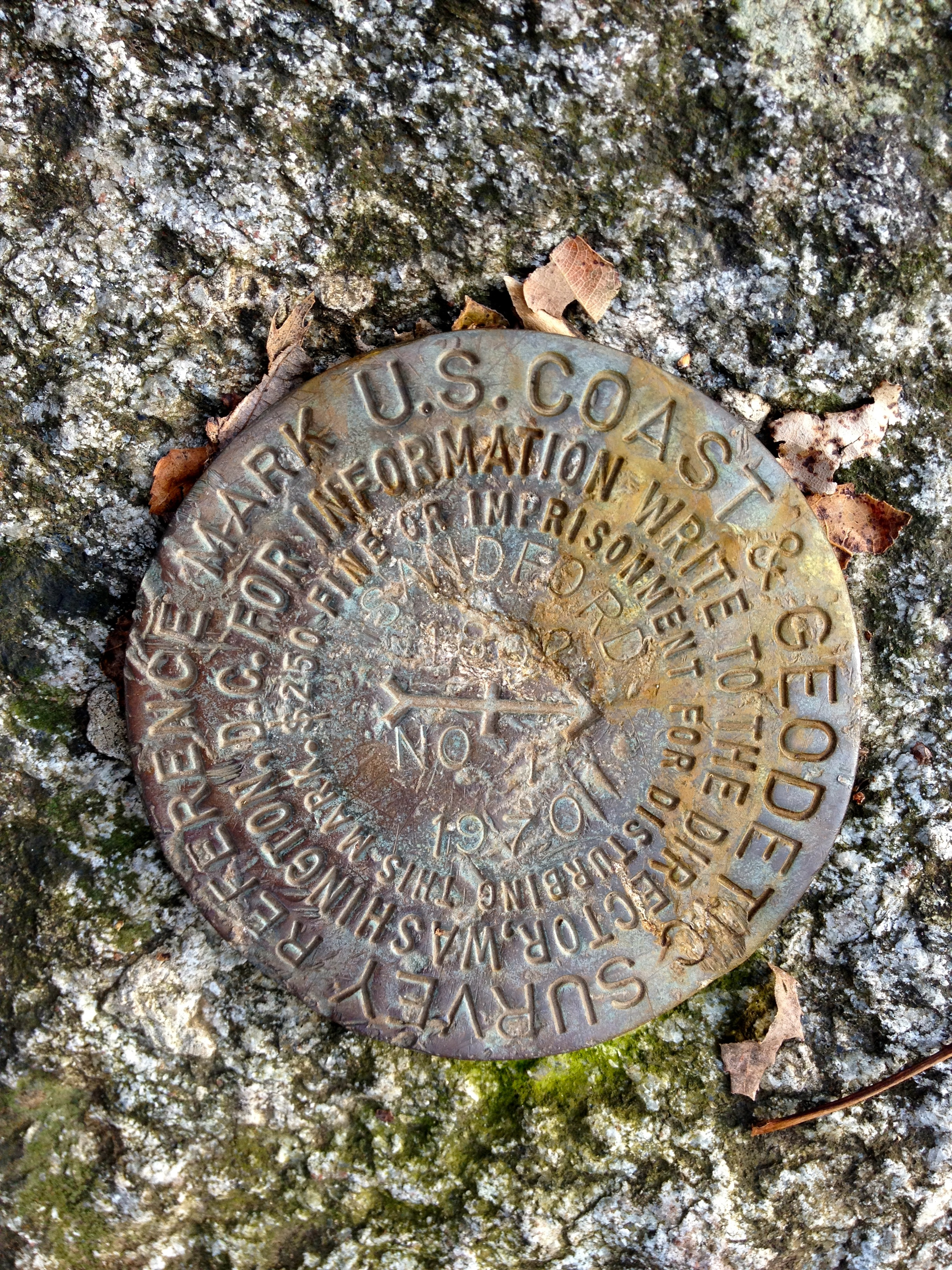
Mount Sanford

Southwest ↓

West Rock Ridge

South ↓

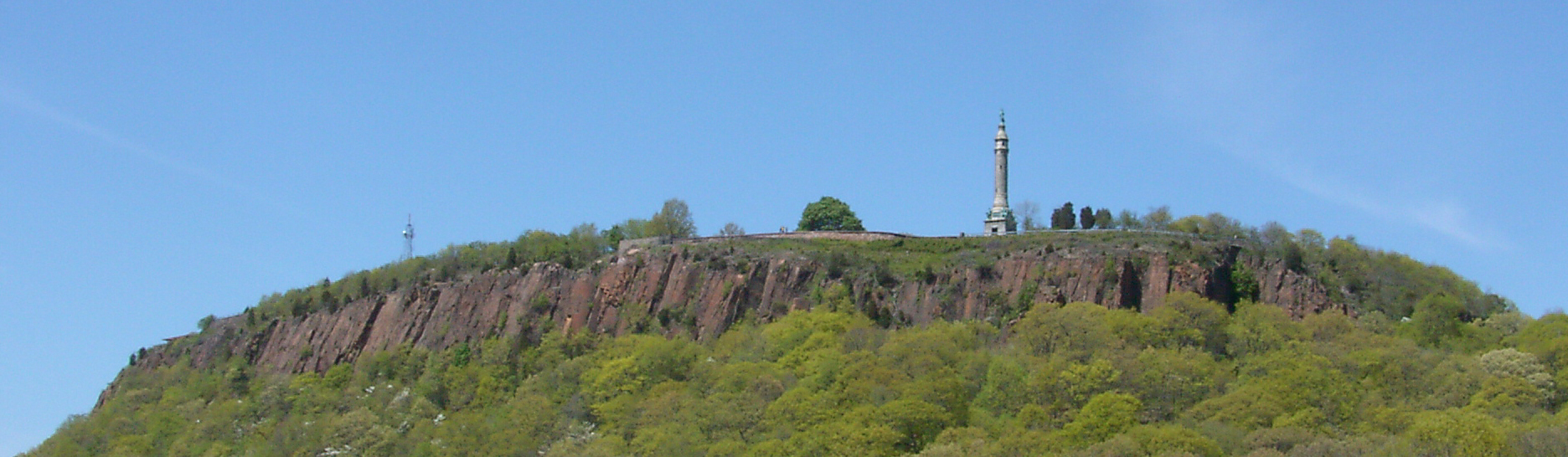
East Rock

Southeast ↓

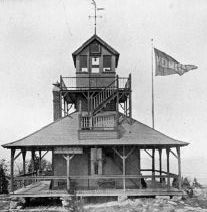
Peter's Rock
