= Heroes Tunnel =

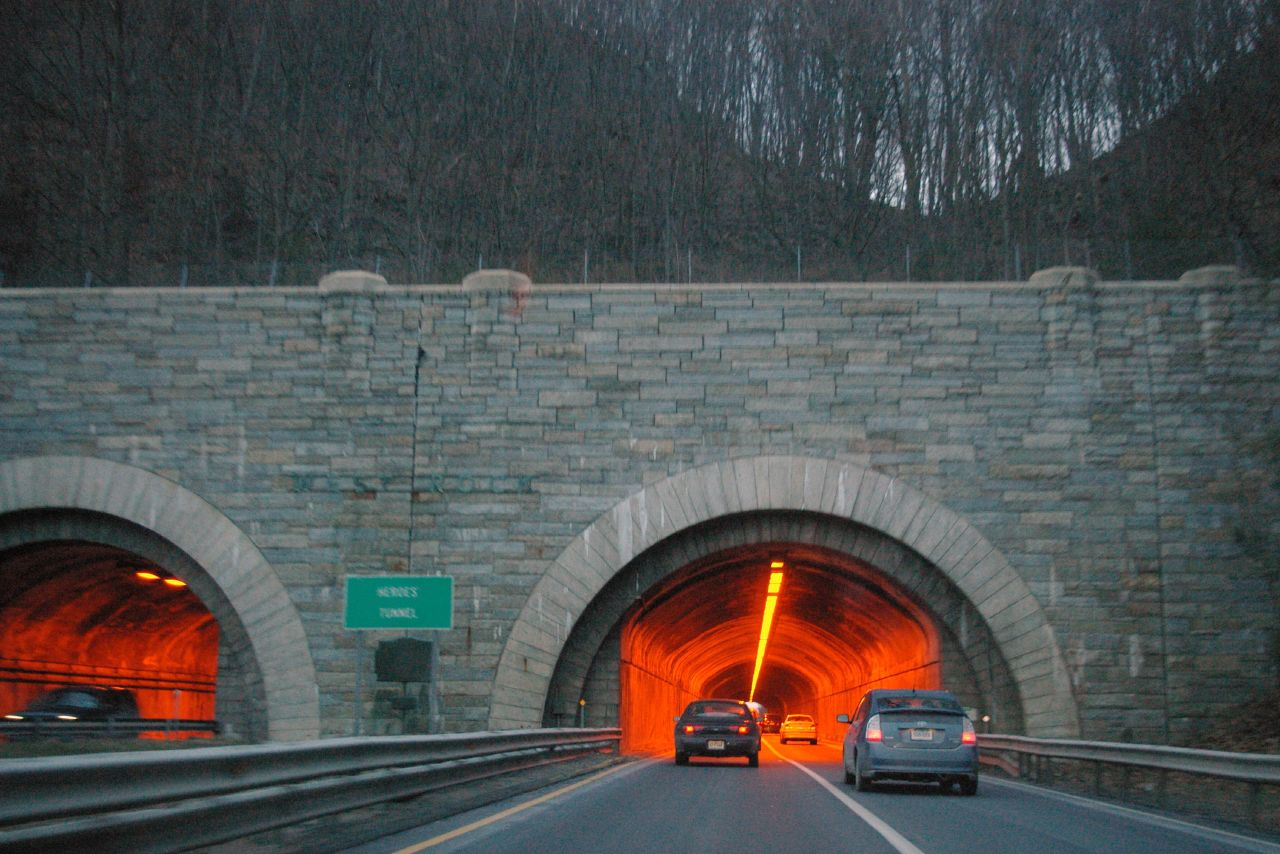
- Interactive map of Heroes Tunnel

Overview
- Other name: West Rock Tunnel (former)
- Location: Woodbridge, Connecticut
- Coordinates: 41.3456°N 72.9695°W
- Route: Route 15 (Wilbur Cross Parkway)

Operation
- Constructed: Beginning March 1948
- Opened: November 1, 1949

Technical
- Length: 1,200 ft (370 m)
- No. of lanes: 4
- Operating speed: 55 miles per hour (89 km/h)

Heroes Tunnel (formerly West Rock Tunnel) is a 1,200-foot-long (370 m), twin-tube tunnel carrying Route 15 (Wilbur Cross Parkway) through West Rock Ridge in New Haven, Connecticut, opened in 1949. It is the only highway tunnel to pass beneath a natural land feature in New England, although there are other types of vehicular tunnels in the region. (Note: There is a vehicular tunnel passing under a man-made land feature in Vernon, Connecticut, and the East Side Trolley Tunnel passes under College Hill in Providence, Rhode Island.)

The tunnel was originally named for the mountain through which it passes, but it was renamed Heroes Tunnel in 2003 to honor "heroes of all kinds" in the post-September 11 era. In 2015, the State of Connecticut approved $200 million to fix and expand the tunnel.

== Description ==
Heroes Tunnel is a twin bore tunnel, 1200 feet in length with bores 63 feet center to center, 23-foot roadways flanked by curbs 2 feet 6 inches wide and tile lined side-walls. The side wall contains 1/4-inch in diameter and spaced 4 inches on the center. The pavement in the tunnel extends 50 feet outside of the tunnel walls at each end. It is eight-inch reinforced concrete. 300 watt lights are spaced on 30-foot centers.

== History ==
Studies were conducted for a tunnel through West Rock on the Wilbur Cross Parkway in the late 1930s. A common problem engineers faced was to project a line as near to New Haven as possible and avoid the rock formations in the area. A route that went west of the mountain through the Bethany gap was struck down due to the Bethany gap being too far inland to serve New Haven. East of the mountain was ruled out as it contained very poor alignment and several properties. It was then decided in 1940 that the shortest and most direct route was through the West Rock mountain. Consultants decided that a tunnel through West Rock would cost $100,000 less than a route around the mountain. World War II would cause temporary abandonment of the project.

=== Construction ===
After the tunnel was decided as the best option, workers began to test the character of the rock. A hole was drilled at the summit below the proposed grade. After the tests were complete, the consultants had two plans for the tunnel: A twin bore or a single bore. The final plans were a twin bore tunnel. Work began on the tunnel on March 10, 1948. The contractors decided first to clear up a workplace and excavate the tubes. The tunnel was designed on an ascending 3% grade west to east. The west portal was worked on first since it was a lower grade. On June 21, the holes were drilled and the arch section was added shortly after.

Operations were handled by two shifts of two crews each. Each drilling crew was made up of twelve drillers, twelve suckers, two scaling miners, and one boss. A 30-inch metal ventilating line was installed in each bore suspended at the height of 7 feet above the tunnel floor. The two tunnels ventilation formed a Y which at the base would contain a 36-inch reversible fan. A concrete ventilation shaft was built which is located midway between the tunnels. There is a control room at the base of the shaft. The fans in the shaft would exhaust bad air from the tunnels and blow it up into the shaft out of one of the four ducts. The fans are controlled by carbon monoxide detectors. The tunnel's lighting system was designed to meet both day and night conditions with lights being located on the center line of the roof. Caution and stop lights were installed for emergency use. Removal of any fire extinguisher would automatically change the lights and start the ventilating fan. One life was lost during the construction of the tunnel. The tunnel opened to traffic on November 1, 1949.

=== Change in Lighting ===
From January to February 2024, the tunnel lights were changed from Low-pressure sodium (LPS) lamps to LEDs. Public reception was mixed, due to a fondness of the warm and intense atmosphere provided by the LPS lamps.
