= Quinnipiac Trail =

Hiking trail in Connecticut, United States

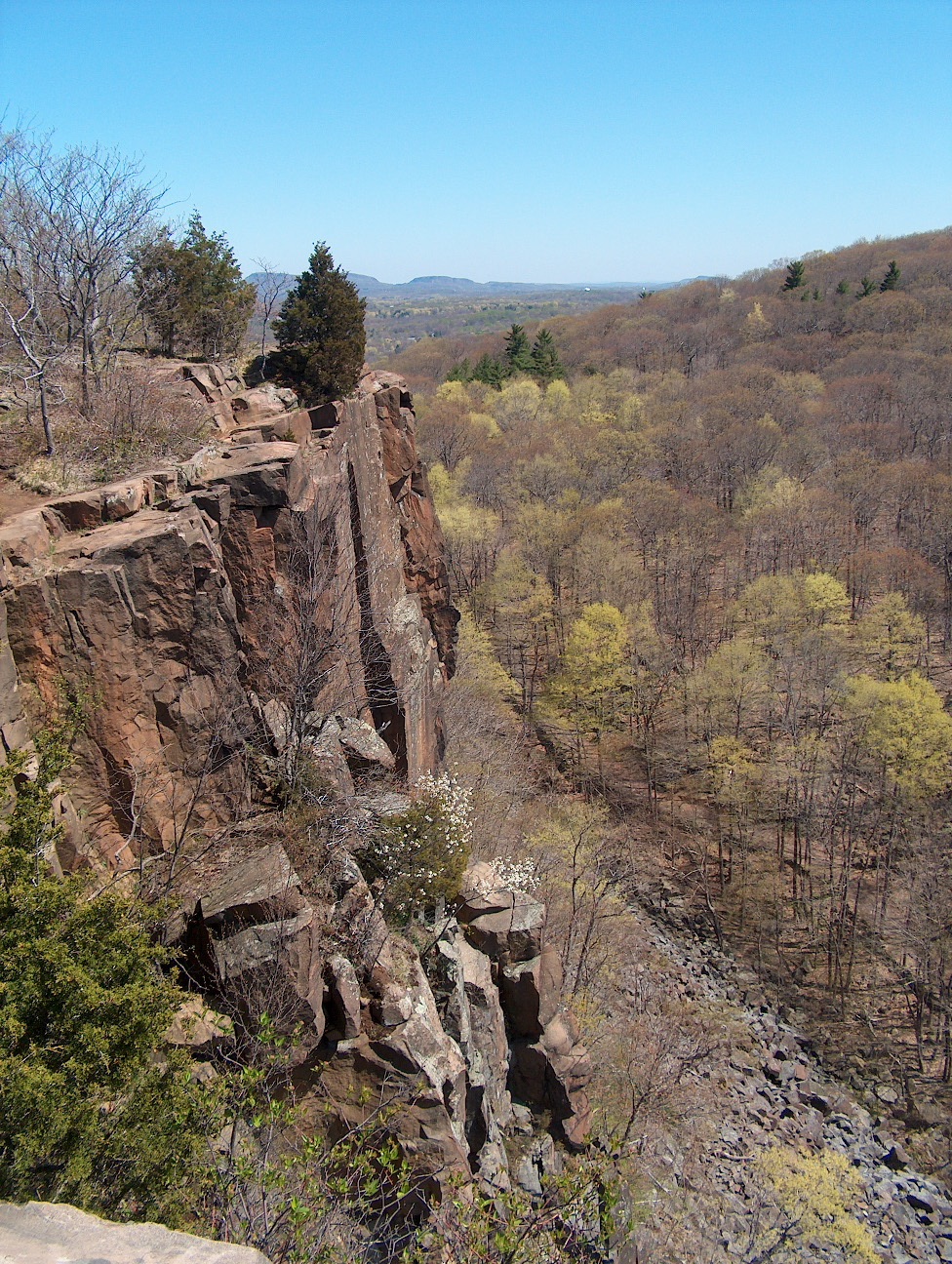
- View from the Sleeping Giant
- Length: 24.0 miles (38.6 km)
- Location: New Haven County, Connecticut, USA
- Designation: CFPA Blue-Blazed Trail
- Trailheads: Start: Chatfield Road, Prospect. End: Banton Street, North Haven.
- Use: hiking, cross-country skiing, snowshoeing, fishing, geocaching, other
- Highest point: Mount Sanford, 890 ft (270 m)
- Lowest point: Quinnipiac River in Quinnipiac River State Park
- Difficulty: Moderate with some easy and hard sections
- Sights: Roaring Brook Falls, Sleeping Giant peaks, Sleeping Giant stone tower, foundations and fences
- Hazards: hunters, deer ticks, poison ivy

The Quinnipiac Trail is a 24-mile (39 km) Blue-Blazed hiking trail in New Haven County, Connecticut. It is the product of the evolution and growth of the first 10.6-mile (17.1 km) trail designated in Connecticut's Blue-Blazed Hiking Trail system, with its light-blue rectangular vertical painted blazes .

== The Route ==
From its southeastern trailhead (at 41°23′52.97″N 72°52′6.66″W), its easternmost leg runs northward, paralleling the west bank of the Quinnipiac River and the east side of the Wilbur Cross Parkway through the entire length of the (undeveloped) Quinnipiac River State Park in North Haven. Note, this section of the trail through Quinnipiac River State Park has been officially abandoned, and is no longer blazed or maintained. Connecticut Forest and Parks Association, who maintains the CT blue blazed trail system, now recognizes the trail head at Old Hartford Turnpike as the southern terminus of the trail. It was deemed impractical to maintain the trail through the active floodplain of the Quinnipiac River.

Turning mostly westward, away from the river, at the Toelles Road bridge at Hartford Turnpike in North Haven, the Quinnipiac Trail traverses virtually the length of the Sleeping Giant State Park (5.1 miles east/west).

Just northwest of the "chest", an eight-mile (13 km) spur of the trail leads NNW, exiting the Park, crossing the Cheshire town line, continues north past Route 42, and after a steep hike overlooking the dramatic chasms of Roaring Brook Falls near the Prospect border, ends near Route 68 on Chatfield Road.

== Views ==
Within Hamden's Sleeping Giant park, the trail—designated as the "Blue Trail" among the park's system of trails with variously colored rectangular blazes, and variously shaped red ones, passes such dramatic overlooks as Hezekiah's Knob (680 feet, at 41°26'3.00"N 72°52'25.89"W) and the stone Tower (739 feet at its ground floor). The giant's "chin" (670 ft) offers steep climbs, sweeping southwesterly views of the Quinnipiac University campus and beyond to Long Island Sound. The trail descends on relatively on an exposed slope along an abandoned quarry to the Mill River, west along Mount Carmel Avenue in Hamden, intersecting with both Whitney Avenue (Route 10), and the Farmington Canal Greenway.

Between Whitney Avenue westward to Shepard Avenue (1.3 miles), the trail ascends Rocky Top, site of the Quinnipiac University hockey/basketball arena, the TD Bank Sports Center, opened in January, 2007 (also accessible by vehicle from Sherman Avenue). Since the clearing of surrounding land in 2007, the pinnacle of this 234-acre (0.95 km^{2}), future-campus site rises well above the stadium structures, affording 360 degree views.

To the northeast, the distinctive Metacomet Ridge is visible in Meriden, 14.4 miles (23.2 km) from this point. To the ENE is a view of the traprock quarry on the west-facing side (or "top") of the Sleeping Giant's head. To the east lies the original Quinnipiac University campus, with its signature white steeple.

Due south is the familiar landmark of East Rock (6.1 miles), once a sacred site of the native Quinnipiac tribe, called "Roodenbergh", by Dutch explorers in the early 17th century, for its red, rocky cliffs. Atop East Rock stands the Civil War Soldiers and Sailors Monument with its tall, thin column of the Angel of Victory, refurbished in 2006. The New Haven skyline is silhouetted against its shimmering harbor on the Sound. Beyond, (31 miles) across the Sound lie the distant dunes of North Shore Beach in Long Island.

To the south-southwest can be seen the undulating forests of West Rock Ridge State Park, site of the Regicides Trail. At its southwest extremity, the QT connects with the Regicides Trail, along the West Rock Ridge, where it passes Judges' Cave.

== Recognition / Inspiration Programs ==
The Connecticut Forest and Park Association (CFPA) provides commemorative patches as recognition to hikers completing the entire length of one of the three original Blue-Blazed trails in Connecticut (Quinnipiac, Metacomet and Mattabesett). The Quinnipiac Trail patch can be obtained for a small fee ($1) after the hiking the entire trail is completed by contacting the Connecticut Forest and Park Association.

The Sleeping Giant Park Association (SGPA) recognizes member hikers who have hiked all of the color-blazed trails in Sleeping Giant State Park including the Quinnipiac Trail section (AKA "Blue Trail") with a "Giant Master" certificate and an entry on the "Giant Masters" list webpage. The Giant Master Log form for recording hikes for submission can be obtained as a PDF file.

== Current Route ==
The Quinnipiac Trail, between Banton Street and Toelles Road in North Haven, has been officially closed and is no longer being maintained by CFPA. The new southern terminus of the Quinnipiac Trail is at the Hartford Turnpike. This closure is primarily due to the nature of the floodplain in Quinnipiac River State Park (WB Maps QP 1 & QP 2).

== See also ==
- Blue-Blazed Trails
- Sleeping Giant State Park
- Quinnipiac River State Park
- Quinnipiac River
