= List of Metacomet Ridge summits =

The following is a list of the more notable summits and sub–ranges that make up the crest of the Metacomet Ridge, a fault-block landform located in Connecticut and Massachusetts, known for its microclimate ecosystems, rare plant communities, scenic vistas, proximity to major urban centers, and recreational opportunities.

In southern Connecticut, the Metacomet Ridge consists of two parallel ridges; the western ridge terminates near Meriden, Connecticut while the eastern ridge continues north into Massachusetts proximal to the Connecticut River. Notable summits with elevations are included below, listed from south to north.

In Connecticut:
West ridgeline

"West Rock, New Haven" by Frederic Edwin Church, 1849

Name	Elevation	Location
East Rock	366 ft (112 m)	New Haven and Hamden
West Rock Ridge	700 ft (213 m) *	New Haven, Hamden, Woodbridge, and Bethany
Sleeping Giant	739 ft (225 m)	Hamden and Wallingford
Mount Sanford	880 ft (270 m) *	Hamden, Bethany, and Cheshire
Peck Mountain	431 ft (131 m)	Cheshire

East ridgeline

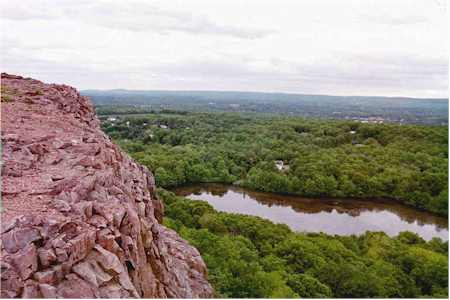
Traprock escarpment of Ragged Mountain, Southington Connecticut

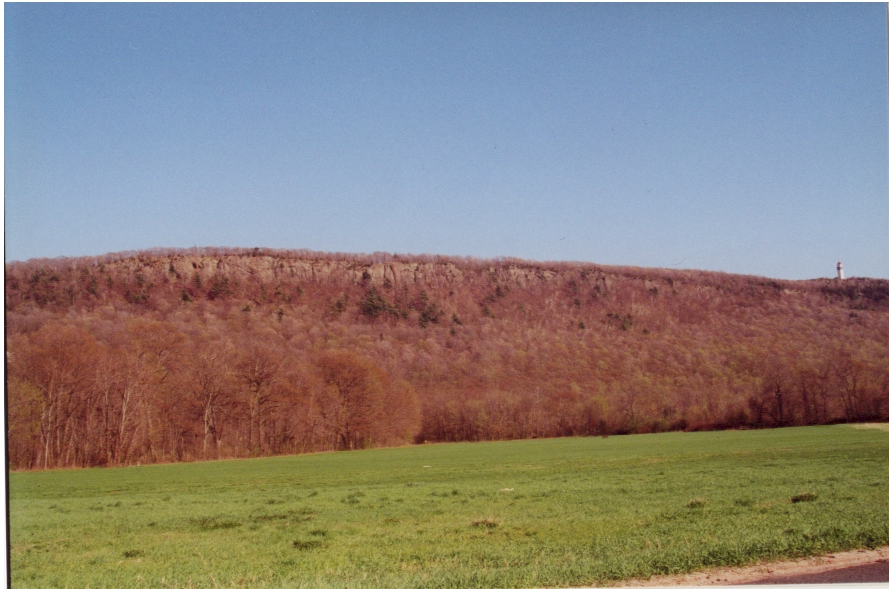
Talcott Mountain ridgeline

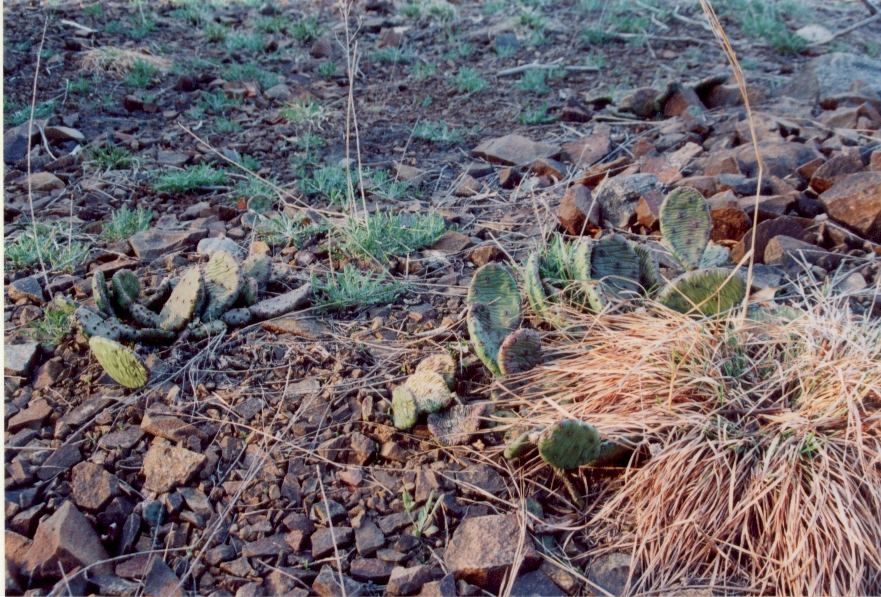
Prickly pear cactus, Metacomet Ridge in Connecticut

Name	Elevation	Location
Beacon Hill	130 ft (40 m) *	Branford
Saltonstall Mountain	320 ft (98 m) *	Branford, North Branford, and East Haven
Peter's Rock	373 ft (114 m)	North Haven
Totoket Mountain	720 ft (219 m) *	North Branford, Durham, and Guilford
Pistapaug Mountain	700 ft (213 m) *	Durham
Fowler Mountain	750 ft (229 m)	Wallingford
Trimountain	760 ft (232 m) *	Durham and Wallingford
Besek Mountain	840 ft (256 m) *	Meriden, Wallingford, and Middlefield
Higby Mountain	892 ft (272 m)	Middlefield and Middletown
Chauncey Peak	688 ft (210 m)	Meriden
Lamentation Mountain	720 ft (219 m)	Berlin, Middletown, and Meriden
The Hanging Hills	1,024 ft (312 m)	Berlin, Meriden, and Southington
Short Mountain	530 ft (162 m)	Berlin and Southington
Ragged Mountain	761 ft (232 m)	Berlin and Southington
Bradley Mountain	700 ft (213 m)	Plainville and Southington
Pinnacle Rock	600 ft (183 m)	Plainville and Farmington
Rattlesnake Mountain	750 ft (229 m)	Farmington
Farmington Mountain	530 ft (162 m)	Farmington
Talcott Mountain	950 ft (290 m)*	West Hartford, Farmington, Avon, Bloomfield, and Simsbury
Hatchet Hill	510 ft (155 m)	East Granby
Peak Mountain	730 ft (223 m)	East Granby
Barn Door Hills	580 ft (177 m) *	Granby
West Suffield Mountain	710 ft (216 m)	Suffield
Manitook Mountain	638 ft (194 m)	Granby

In Massachusetts

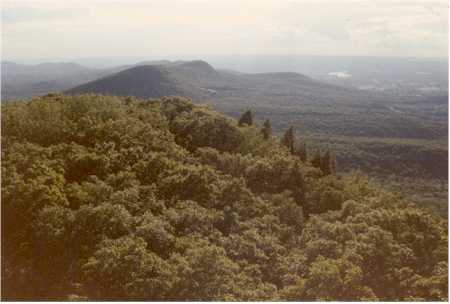
Holyoke Range, Long Mountain from Mount Norwottuck

Name	Elevation	Location
Provin Mountain	600 ft (183 m)	Southwick, Agawam, and Westfield
East Mountain	776 ft (237 m)	Holyoke, West Springfield, and Westfield
Mount Tom Range	1202 ft (363 m)	Holyoke and Easthampton
Holyoke Range	1106 ft (337 m)	Hadley, South Hadley, Granby, Amherst, and Belchertown
Mount Toby	1269 ft (387 m)	Sunderland and Leverett
Sugarloaf Mountain	791 ft (241 m)	Deerfield
Pocumtuck Range	846 ft (258 m)	Deerfield and Greenfield

* Estimated elevation accurate within +9/-0 ft (+3/-0 m).
