= McLean Game Refuge =

Nature preserve in Connecticut, US

- Lean Refuge
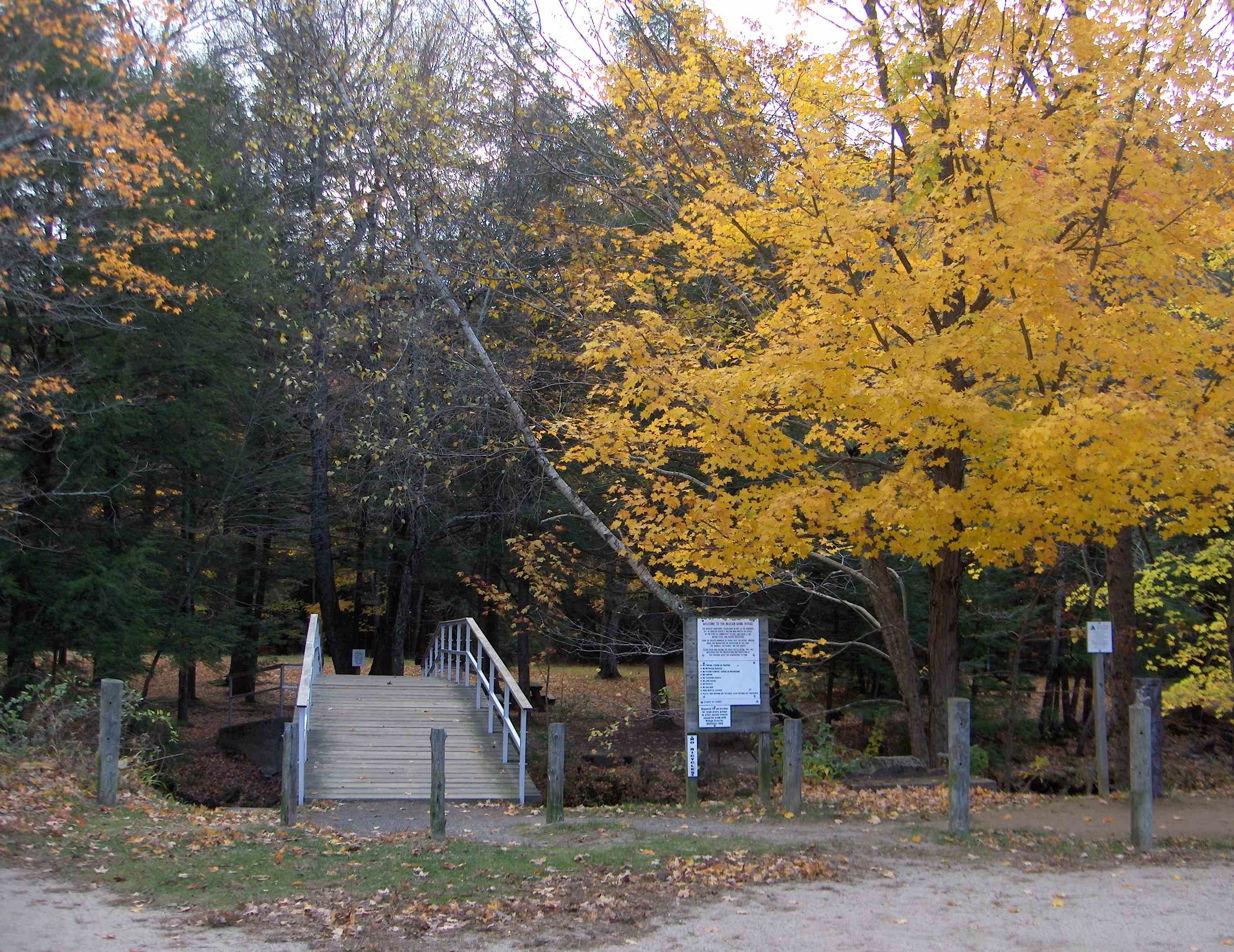
- Barndoor Hills Road entrance to McLean Game Refuge

- Location within Connecticut
- Location: Hartford County, Connecticut
- Coordinates: 41°55′14″N 72°47′19″W
- Area: 4,400 acres (1,800 ha)
- Established: 1932

U.S. National Natural Landmark
- Designated: 1973

The McLean Game Refuge is a 4,400 acres (1,800 ha) nature preserve with the overwhelming majority of the land being in the town of Granby, with smaller tracts of land on the Granby border in Simsbury and Canton, Connecticut. Senator and Governor of Connecticut, George P. McLean had purchased the land throughout his life. It was left to the McLean Fund upon his death in 1932 and remains open to the public today. In November 1973, 1,800 acres (730 ha) of the Refuge were designated a National Natural Landmark.

== History ==
In 1903, after serving as governor, McLean returned to his family farm and began purchasing land. In 1905, he received a $3 million inheritance which he immediately put to work increasing his land which continued until his death. He became a Senator in 1911 and served three terms, during which he helped pass the Migratory Bird Treaty Act of 1918. He often brought political colleagues to visit the Refuge, including United States Presidents Coolidge, Taft and Hoover.

In 1912, McLean met Amos Everett George, a Pequot Indian who became the caretaker of his lands, building the trails and huts throughout the Refuge. George's two sons followed him as caretaker in turn.

=== McLean Fund ===
When McLean died in 1932, he created the McLean Fund to be responsible for McLean, a senior living community and health care services provider, as well as the Refuge. The McLean Fund has eight Trustees which are overseen by the Simsbury Probate Court.

The McLean Fund continues to manage the Refuge today.

On October 1, 2008, the senior living community and services (McLean Village, Health Center, Home Care, and Hospice) were re-organized as a subsidiary of the McLean Fund named McLean Affiliates, Inc., and the McLean Game Refuge was set up as a separate corporation as a subsidiary of the parent company "The McLean Fund".

== Description ==
=== Geography ===
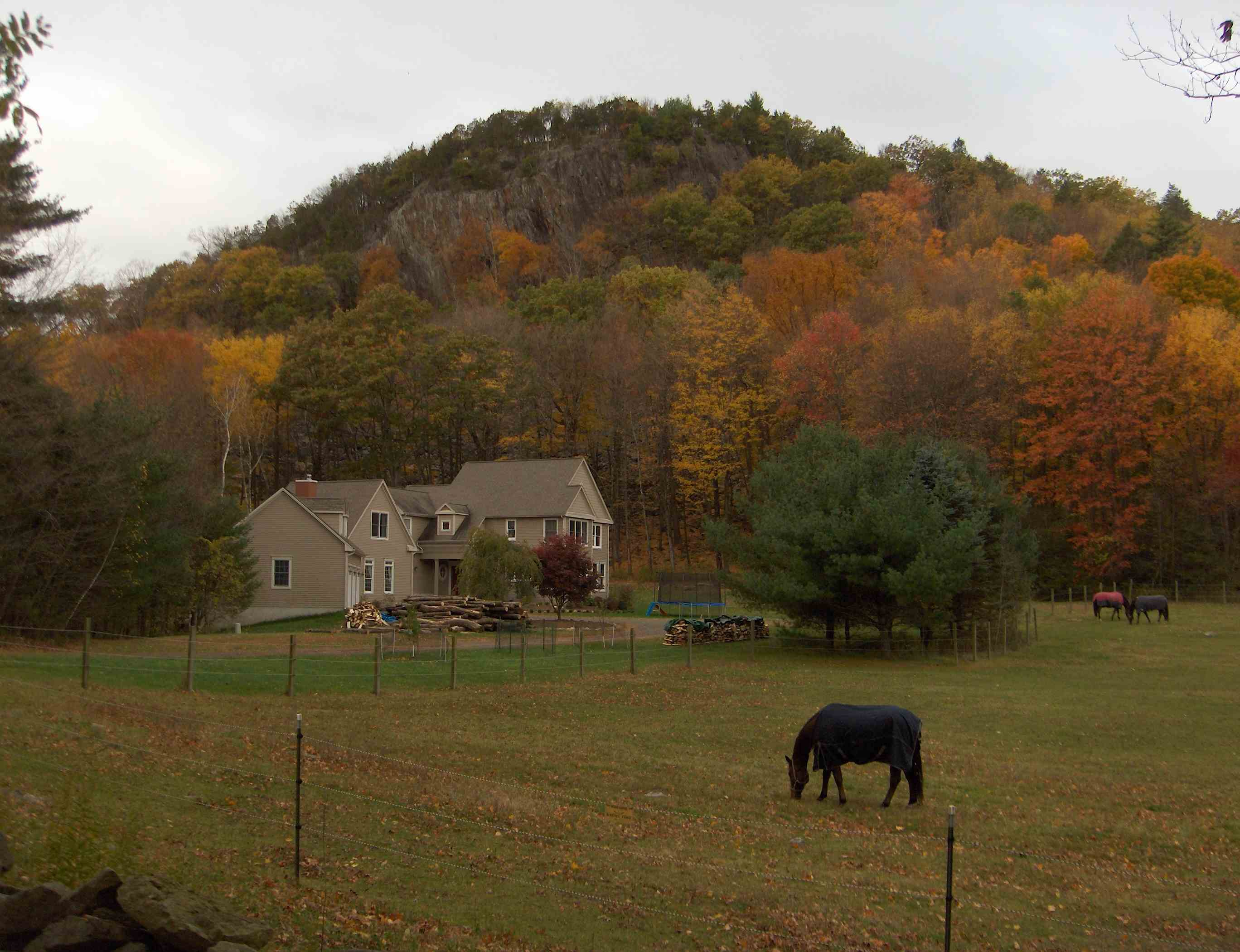
Western Barndoor Hill

The diverse geology of the Refuge includes Paleozoic metamorphic rock in the western sections. In the east are trap rock ridges from the Triassic period including the Barn Door Hills which are part of the Metacomet Ridge. Other portions of the Refuge are sandy plains, esker fields and kettle ponds created by the melting glaciers in the Pleistocene period.

Trout Pond and Spring Pond were created by damming creeks. East Barn Door hill at 560 feet (170 m) is inside the Refuge while West Barn Door hill at 671 feet (205 m) is in the nearby Granby Land Trust.

=== Hiking trails ===
There are over 20 miles (32 km) of hiking trails as well as two horse trails. There are two main entrances and several access points.

=== Archaeological survey ===
In 1993 and 1995, the McLean Game Refuge was the subject of an archaeological survey, conducted by Kenneth Feder of Central Connecticut State University and Marc Banks of the University of Connecticut. Their investigation "produced some important data about the prehistoric landscape signature of this region and implicitly of the prehistoric Indian use of an interior portion of the Farmington Valley."

== Flora and fauna ==
The Refuge is known as a beautiful and prolific birdwatching site. Many species of birds including pileated woodpecker, blue-headed vireo, winter wren, hermit thrush and Blackburnian warbler are commonly seen.

Vegetation in the area varies with the terrain, but can include chestnut, oak, beech, birch, maple, and hemlock. Shrubs include huckleberry, blueberry, and mountain laurel. Since this area had been logged for timber and charcoal before McLean purchased it, many of these are stump sprouts.
