= Hypolith =

Photosynthetic organism that lives underneath rocks

In Arctic and Antarctic ecology, a hypolith is a community of photosynthetic organisms, and extremophiles, that live underneath rocks in climatically extreme deserts such as Cornwallis Island and Devon Island in the Canadian high Arctic. The community itself is the hypolithon.

Hypolithons are protected by their rock from harsh ultraviolet irradiation and wind scouring. The rocks can also trap moisture and are generally translucent allowing light to penetrate while omitting incident ultra-violet light. Writing in Nature, ecologist Charles S. Cockell of the British Antarctic Survey and Dale Stokes (Scripps Institution of Oceanography) describe how hypoliths reported to date (until 2004) had been found under quartz, which is one of the most common translucent minerals.

However, Cockell reported that on Cornwallis Island and Devon Island, 94-95% of a random sample of 850 opaque dolomitic rocks were colonized by hypoliths, and found that the communities were dominated by cyanobacteria. The rocks chosen were visually indistinguishable from those nearby, and were about 10 cm across; the hypolithon was visible as a greenish coloured band. Cockell proposed that rock sorting by periglacial action, including that during freeze–thaw cycles, improves light penetration around the edges of rocks (see granular material and Brazil nut effect).

Cockell and Stokes went on to estimate the productivity of the Arctic communities by monitoring the uptake of sodium bicarbonate labelled with Carbon-14 and found that (for Devon Island) productivity of the hypolithon was comparable to that of plants, lichens, and bryophytes combined (0.8 ± 0.3 g m^{−2} y^{−1} and 1 ± 0.4 g m^{−2} y^{−1} respectively) and concluded that the polar hypolithon may double previous estimates of the productivity of that region of the rocky polar desert.

== See also ==
- Endolith
