= Beacon Hill (Branford, Connecticut) =

- Location within Connecticut

Highest point
- Elevation: 130+ feet (40+ m) NGVD 29
- Listing: Metacomet Ridge summits
- Coordinates: 41°16′18″N 72°51′29″W

Geography
- Location: Branford, Connecticut
- Parent range: Metacomet Ridge

Geology
- Rock age: 200 Ma
- Mountain type(s): Fault-block; igneous

Climbing
- Easiest route: Branford Trail

Beacon Hill, (est.) 130 feet (40 m) above sea level, is a traprock outcrop located 1.2 miles (1.9 km) southeast of New Haven, Connecticut overlooking the mouth of the Farm River 1.2 miles north of Long Island Sound. It is the southernmost notable summit of the Metacomet Ridge which extends from Long Island Sound near New Haven, Connecticut, north through the Connecticut River Valley of Massachusetts to nearly the Vermont border. Beacon Hill is known for its scenic ledges overlooking a surrounding salt marsh and the greater Sound and for its unique microclimate ecosystems and rare plant communities. Beacon Hill is traversed by several trails, most notably the 28-mile (45 km) Branford Trail. The Shoreline Trolley Museum runs trolley service to the base of the hill.

Beacon Hill should not be confused with Beacon Hill of New Haven, another traprock hill, 2 miles (3 km) to the west.

== Geography ==
Beacon Hill rises steeply 100 feet (30 m) above the surrounding landscape and (est.) 130 feet (40 m) above Long Island Sound. It is roughly 0.8 miles (1.3 km) long by 0.3 miles (0.5 km) wide. The hill lies within the town of Branford. The Farm River runs along the west side of the hill and a tributary salt marsh extends around the south and southeast sides. U.S. 1 borders the hill to the north and separates it from Saltonstall Mountain. A small rock quarry (Johnson's Quarry) abandoned in 1942, occupies the south end of the hill.

The Metacomet Ridge continues north from Beacon Hill as Saltonstall Mountain. Low outcrops of traprock continue south from the hill to the shore of Long Island Sound and out into the sound as tide-swept rock outcrops and tiny islands.

== Geology and ecology ==
Beacon Hill, like much of the Metacomet Ridge, is composed of basalt, also called traprock, a volcanic rock. The hill formed near the end of the Triassic Period with the rifting apart of the North American continent from Africa and Eurasia. Lava welled up from the rift and solidified into sheets of strata hundreds of feet thick. Subsequent faulting and earthquake activity tilted the strata, creating the cliffs of Beacon Hill. Hot, dry upper slopes, cool, moist ravines, and mineral-rich ledges of basalt talus produce a combination of microclimate ecosystems on the mountain that support plant and animal species uncommon in greater Connecticut. (See Metacomet Ridge for more information on the geology and ecosystem of Beacon Hill).

== Conservation and recreation ==
Beacon Hill, open to hiking, picnicking, snowshoeing, bird watching, and other passive pursuits, is isolated from the surrounding suburban areas of Branford and East Haven by salt marsh, riverway, and other wetlands. The hill is steep, with talus slopes in several locations, and offers scenic vistas of Long Island Sound and protected salt marsh from a number of outlooks. Several hiking trails cross the property, most notably the Branford Trail, which loops around the circumference of the town of Branford, passing through a number of scenic conservation areas. Short Beach, also a Branford Land Trust property, lies 1 mile (1.6 km) to the south of Beacon Hill along the Branford Trail.

An historic trolley, run by the non-profit Shoreline Trolley Museum, drops hikers and picnickers at a platform at the base of Beacon Hill. The Shoreline Trolley is the oldest running suburban trolley in the United States. Parking for Beacon Hill and the Branford Trail is located on a cul-de-sac at the end of Dominican Road in Branford, less than 0.25 miles (0.3 km) south of U.S. 1 near the East Haven border.

Beacon Hill and several surrounding parcels were conserved by the cooperative effort of the Branford Land Trust, the state of Connecticut, the Town of Branford, and other partners.

== See also ==
- Metacomet Ridge
