= Barn Door Hills =

Mountains in Connecticut, United States

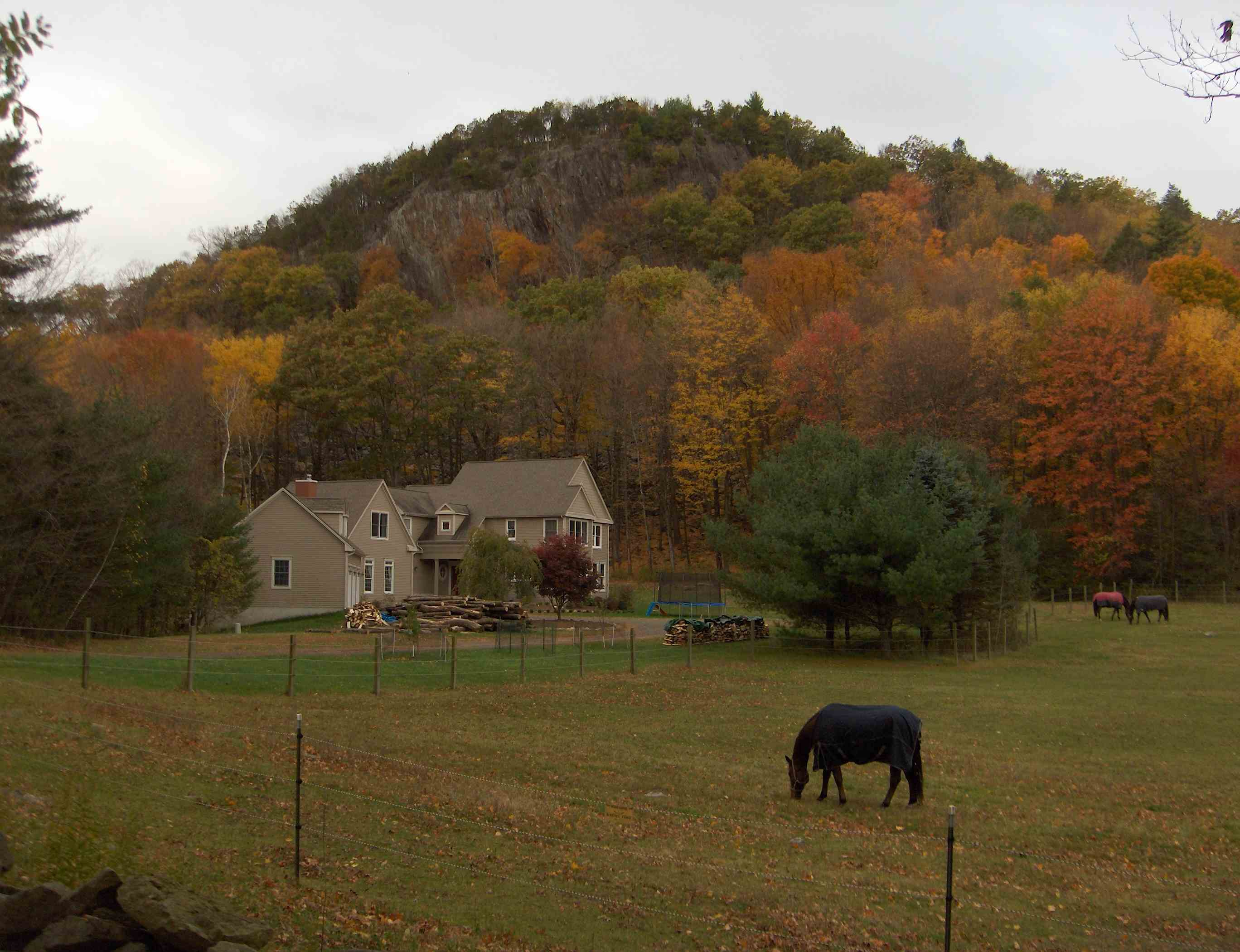
- Western Barndoor Hill from Barndoor Hills Road, looking slightly south of west

Highest point
- Elevation: c. 560 feet (171 m) and c.. 580 feet (177 m)
- Listing: Metacomet Ridge summits
- Coordinates: 41°55′46″N 72°49′31″W and 41°55′57″N 72°49′04″W

Geography
- Location within Connecticut
- Location: Granby, Connecticut
- Parent range: Metacomet Ridge

Geology
- Rock age: 200 million yrs.
- Mountain type(s): Fault-block; igneous

The Barn Door Hills of north-central Connecticut are a pair of prominent rocky trap rock knobs separated by a steep sided gap. They are located in Granby, Connecticut. The hills are an outlying section of the narrow, linear Metacomet Ridge that extends from Long Island Sound near New Haven, north through the Connecticut River Valley of Massachusetts to the Vermont border. The crest of the Metacomet Ridge is located 3.75 miles (6.04 km) east at Hatchet Hill.

== Recreation and conservation ==
East Barndoor Hill is located in the 4,000-acre (16 km^{2}) McLean Game Refuge founded by former United States Senator George P. McLean and now a National Natural Landmark. A hiking trail climbs the summit of the hill. West Barndoor Hill is maintained by the Granby Land Trust.

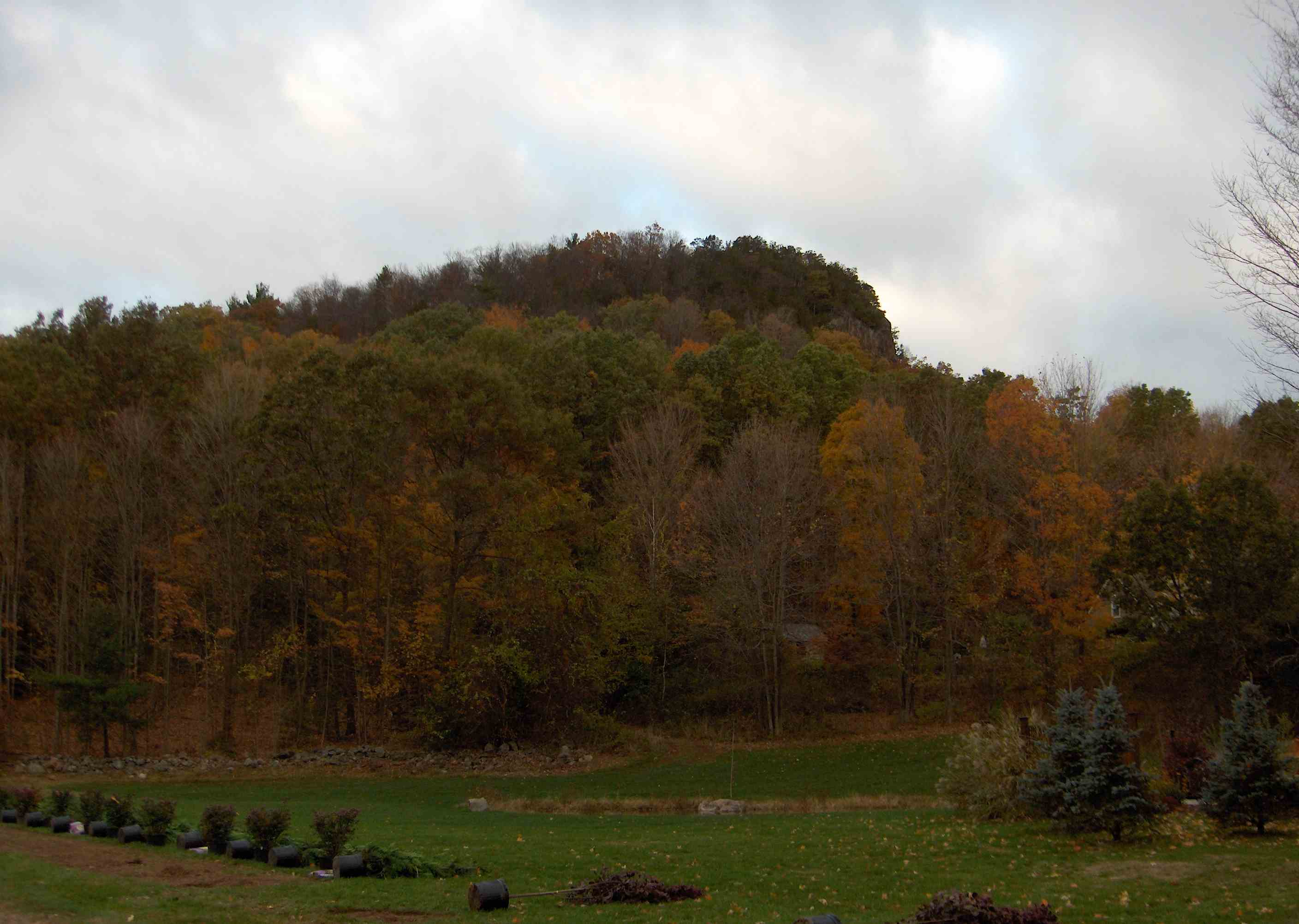
Western Barndoor Hill from Barndoor Hills Road and Kettle Pond Lane
