= Manitook Mountain =

Traprock mountain ridge in the American state of Connecticut

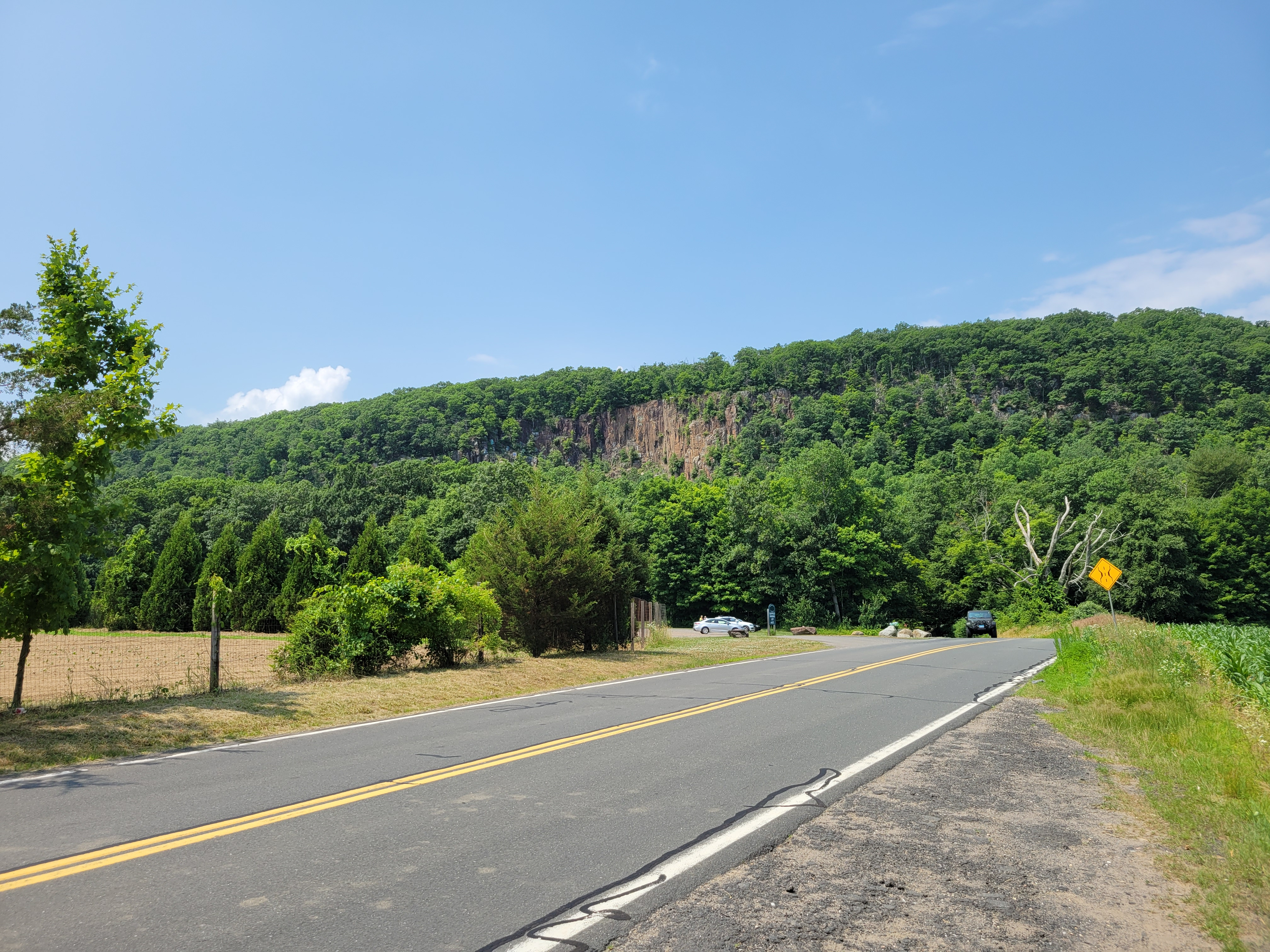
- Northern end of Manitook Mountain

Highest point
- Elevation: 638 ft (194 m)ridge high point
- Coordinates: 41°59′42″N 72°46′33″W

Geography
- Location within Connecticut
- Location: Granby, Connecticut
- Parent range: Metacomet Ridge

Geology
- Rock age: 200 Ma
- Mountain type(s): Fault-block; igneous

Climbing
- Easiest route: trailless

Manitook Mountain, also called Manituck Mountain, 638 feet (194 m), is a 1.6-mile (2.6 km) long traprock mountain ridge located between the Berkshires and the Connecticut River Valley in north-central Connecticut. It is an outlying ridge belonging to the narrow, linear Metacomet Ridge that extends from Long Island Sound near New Haven, Connecticut, north through the Connecticut River Valley of Massachusetts to the Vermont border. Manitook Mountain is known for its ledges and microclimate ecosystems. The mountain has no official trail.

== Geography ==
The Manitook Mountain ridgeline rises steeply to 400 feet (120 m) above the surrounding landscape, with several distinct summits and a high point of 638 feet (194 m) above sea level. Located entirely within Granby, Connecticut, its northern summit abuts the Connecticut/ Massachusetts border near Southwick, Massachusetts. The mountain is particularly prominent as viewed from the Congamond Lakes to the north.

The north side of the mountain drains into the Congamond Lakes then into Great Brook, thence to the Westfield River, the Connecticut River, and Long Island Sound. The remainder of the mountain is of the Salmon Brook watershed, which drains into the Farmington River, thence into the Connecticut River.

== Geology and ecology ==
Manitook Mountain, like much of the Metacomet Ridge, is composed of basalt, also called traprock, a volcanic rock. The mountain formed near the end of the Triassic Period with the rifting apart of the North American continent from Africa and Eurasia. Lava welled up from the rift and solidified into sheets of strata hundreds of feet thick. Subsequent faulting and earthquake activity tilted the strata, creating the cliffs and ridgeline of Manitook Mountain. Hot, dry upper slopes, cool, moist ravines, and mineral-rich ledges of basalt talus produce a combination of microclimate ecosystems on the mountain that support plant and animal species uncommon in greater Connecticut. Manitook Mountain is also an important raptor migration path. (See Metacomet Ridge for more information on the geology and ecosystem of Manitook Mountain).

== Conservation and recreation ==
Expanding suburban sprawl presents the greatest threats to the unique ecosystem and landscape of Manitook Mountain. As of 2007, much of the mountain was still wooded and undeveloped. The Granby Land Trust manages several properties on and near the mountain.
