= Peck Mountain (New Haven County, Connecticut) =

Highest point
- Elevation: 371 ft (113 m)ridge high point
- Coordinates: 41°31′18″N 72°55′15″W

Geography
- Location: Cheshire, Connecticut
- Parent range: Metacomet Ridge

Geology
- Rock age: 200 million yrs.
- Mountain type(s): Fault-block; igneous

Climbing
- Easiest route: trailless

Peck Mountain of south-central Connecticut, 371 feet (113 m), is a traprock mountain ridge located in Cheshire, Connecticut. It is part of the narrow, linear Metacomet Ridge that extends from Long Island Sound near New Haven, north through the Connecticut River Valley of Massachusetts to the Vermont border. The Metacomet Ridge continues south from Peck Mountain as Mount Sanford and north as a diminishing series of hills that extend into Southington, Connecticut.

== See also ==
- Metacomet Ridge
- Adjacent summits:

↓ South

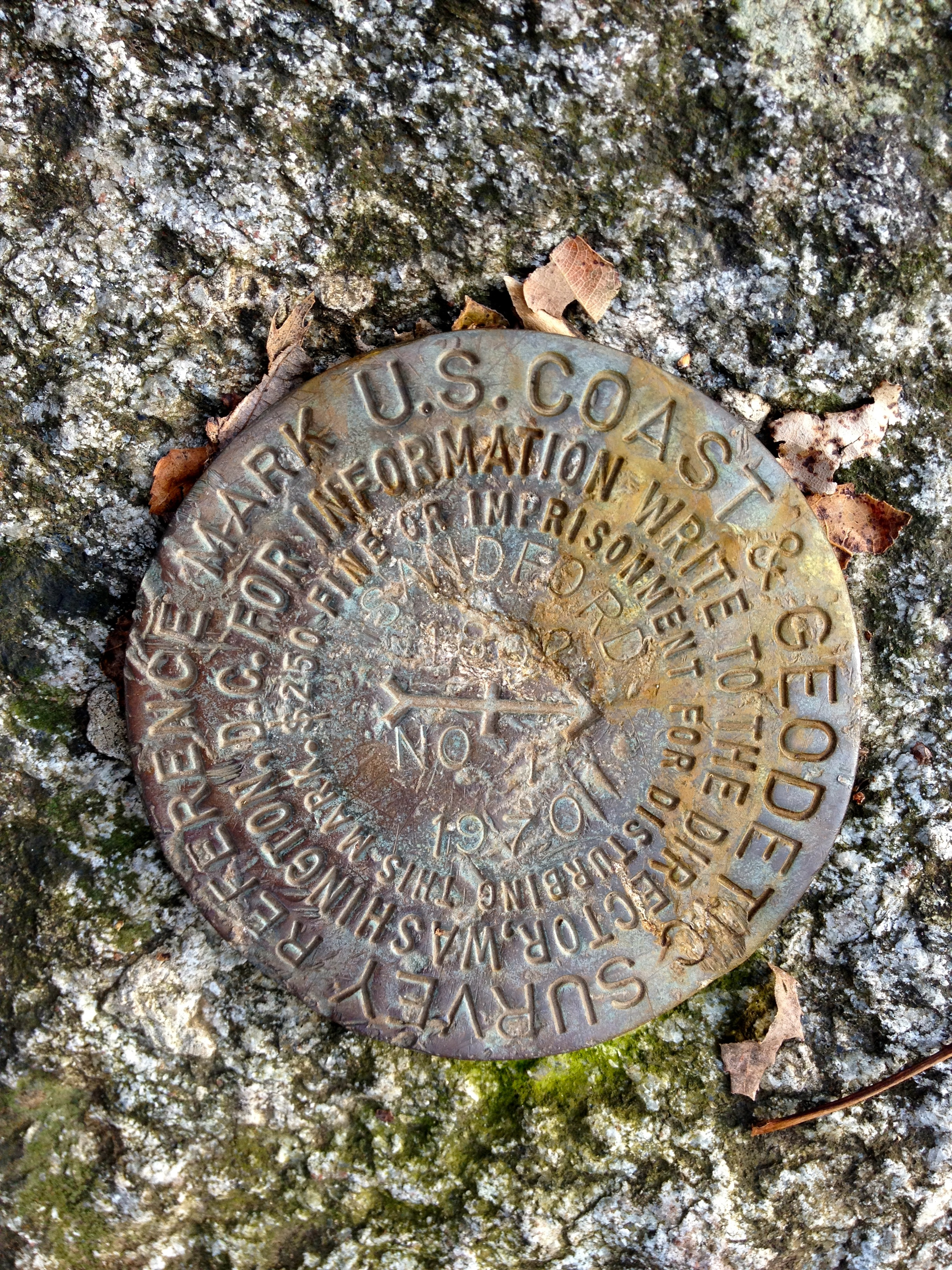
Mount Sanford

↓ Southeast

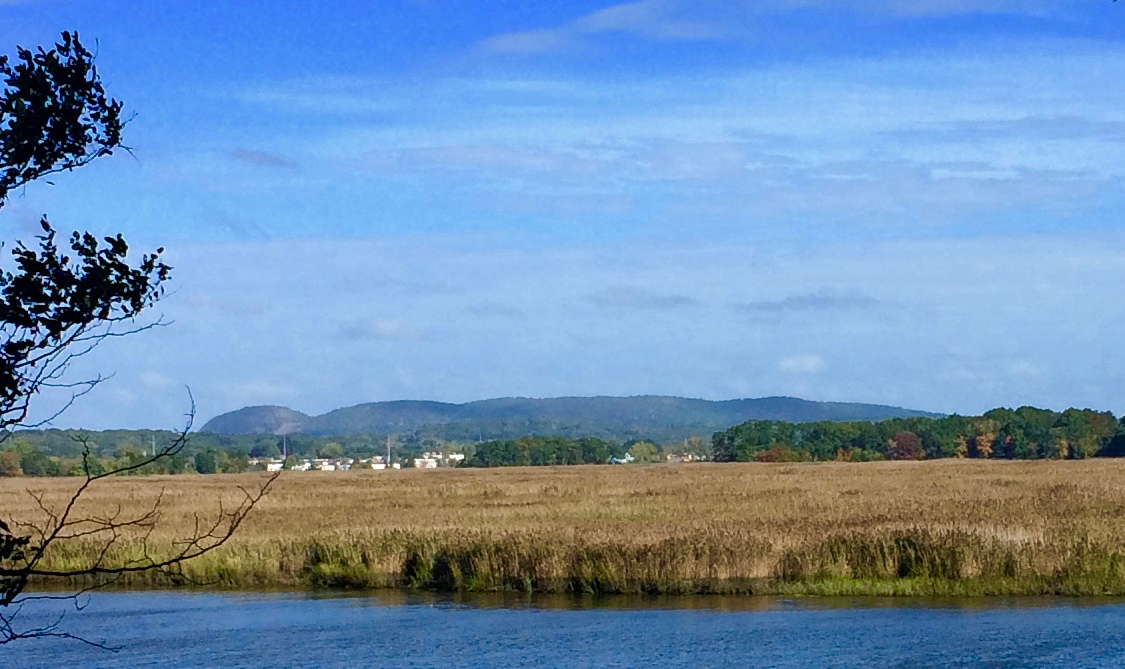
Sleeping Giant (Connecticut)

North ↑
Prospect Ridge
(no image)
Northeast ↑

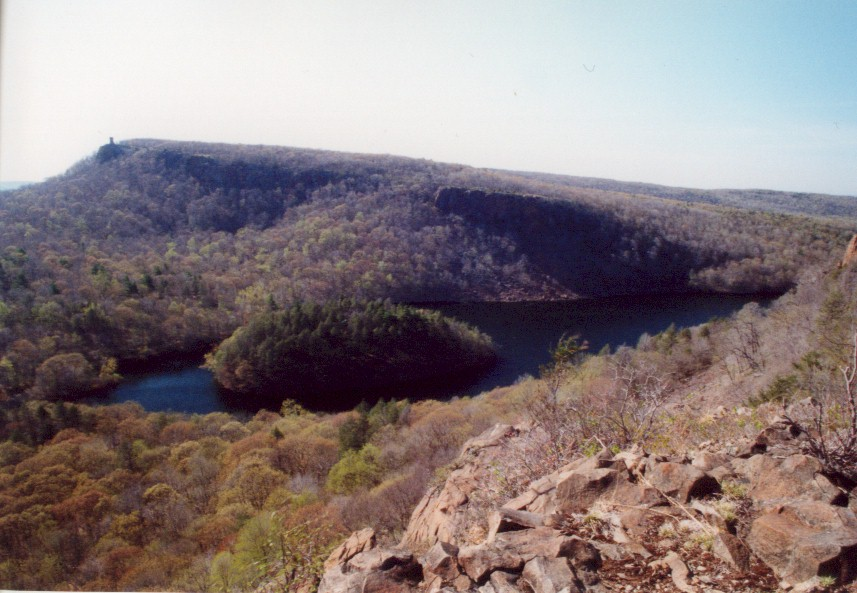
Hanging Hills
