= Peter's Rock =

Mountain in Connecticut, United States

Highest point
- Elevation: 373 ft (114 m)
- Coordinates: 41°20′31″N 72°51′11″W

Geography
- Location: North Haven
- Parent range: Metacomet Ridge

Geology
- Rock age: 200 Ma
- Mountain type(s): Fault-block; igneous

Climbing
- Easiest route: Red Trail

Peter's Rock, also known as Rabbit Rock, Rabbit Hill, Indian Rock and Great Rock, with a high point of (est.) 373 feet (114 m) above sea level, is a trap rock peak located 4 miles (6 km) northeast of downtown New Haven, Connecticut in the town of North Haven. It is part of the Metacomet Ridge that extends from Long Island Sound near New Haven, north through the Connecticut River Valley of Massachusetts to the Vermont border. Peter's Rock is known for its scenic views, unique microclimate ecosystems, rare plant communities, and columnar basalt rock formations. It is traversed by a number of hiking trails managed by the non-profit Peter's Rock Association.

== Geography ==
Peter's Rock rises steeply 300 feet (91 m) above the surrounding landscape, with a high point of (est.) 373 feet (114 m). It is roughly three quarters of a mile long by a quarter of mile (1,000 m × 400 m) wide. The peak lies within the town of North Haven, near the border of East Haven.

The summit is open with a 360° view encompassing Long Island Sound, the Quinnipiac River estuary, New Haven Harbor, and the surrounding peaks of the Metacomet Ridge.

The Metacomet Ridge continues west from the isolated Peter's Rock as East Rock, east as Totoket Mountain and southeast as Saltonstall Mountain. Like East Rock, Peter's Rock lies between the main east and west ridges of the Metacomet Ridge. The east side of Peter's Rock drains into the Farm River, thence to the East Haven River and Long Island Sound; the west side into the Quinnipiac River, thence to New Haven Harbor and Long Island Sound.

== History ==
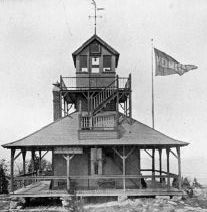
"The Hermitage"

The peak bears a number of competing names. The name Indian Rock was derived from the peak's alleged use as a Native American lookout. Rabbit Rock or Rabbit Hill came about by the peak's notability as a source of cottontail rabbits in the 19th century. According to local folklore the name Peter's Rock is derived from the alleged Peter Brockett, an American Revolutionary War veteran, who, suffering from a crippling and deforming spinal injury, built a small hut on the peak and lived there as a hermit. The United States Board on Geographic Names and the United States Geological Survey refer to the peak as "Rabbit Rock."

A spring on the southwest side of Peter's Rock has been a source of local fresh water since the 19th century when families would travel to the mountain on Sundays to fill up jugs of fresh water. A group of New Haven businessmen built a hunting lodge on the summit in 1901 called The Hermitage; the lodge was abandoned during the Great Depression and fell to ruin. The only remains of the Hermitage are the ruins of the wine cellar that may be seen on one of the trails leading up to the summit.

== Geology and environment ==
Peter's Rock, like much of the Metacomet Ridge, is composed of basalt, also called traprock, a volcanic rock. The mountain formed near the end of the Triassic Period with the rifting apart of the North American continent from Africa and Eurasia. Lava welled up from the rift and solidified into sheets of strata hundreds of feet thick. Subsequent faulting and earthquake activity tilted the strata, creating the cliffs and ridgeline of Peter's Rock. Of particular note is the large, well-defined columnar basalt formation on the southwest side of Peter's Rock.

Hot, dry upper slopes, cool, moist ravines, and mineral-rich ledges of basalt talus produce a combination of microclimate ecosystems on the mountain that support plant and animal species uncommon in greater Connecticut. Peter's Rock is also an important raptor migration path. (See Metacomet Ridge for more information on the geology and ecosystem of Peter's Rock).

== Conservation and recreation ==
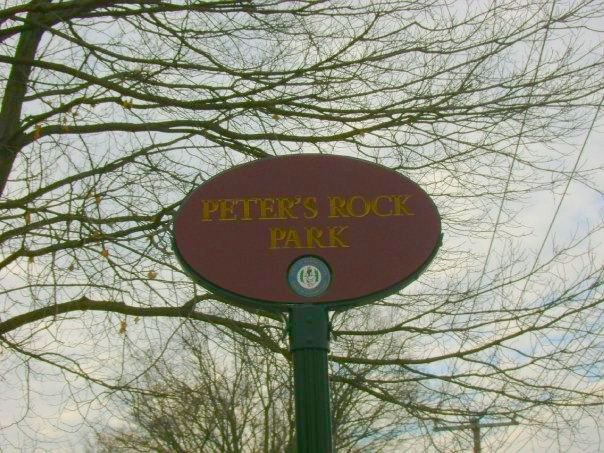
The entrance in 2008

Although Peter's Rock is almost entirely surrounded by suburban neighborhoods, much of it has been conserved by the town of North Haven and through the volunteer efforts of the Peter's Rock Association, which maintains a network of trails on the property. Parking lots and trailheads are located on Middletown Avenue (Connecticut Route 17), just .75 miles (1 km) north of the New Haven city line, and on Hermitage Lane, off Middletown Avenue.

Peter's Rock is open to hiking, picnicking, birdwatching, and other passive pursuits during daylight hours. Alcoholic beverages and ATV's are not allowed on the property.

== See also ==
- Lithoprotection
- Metacomet Ridge
- Adjacent summits:

< West

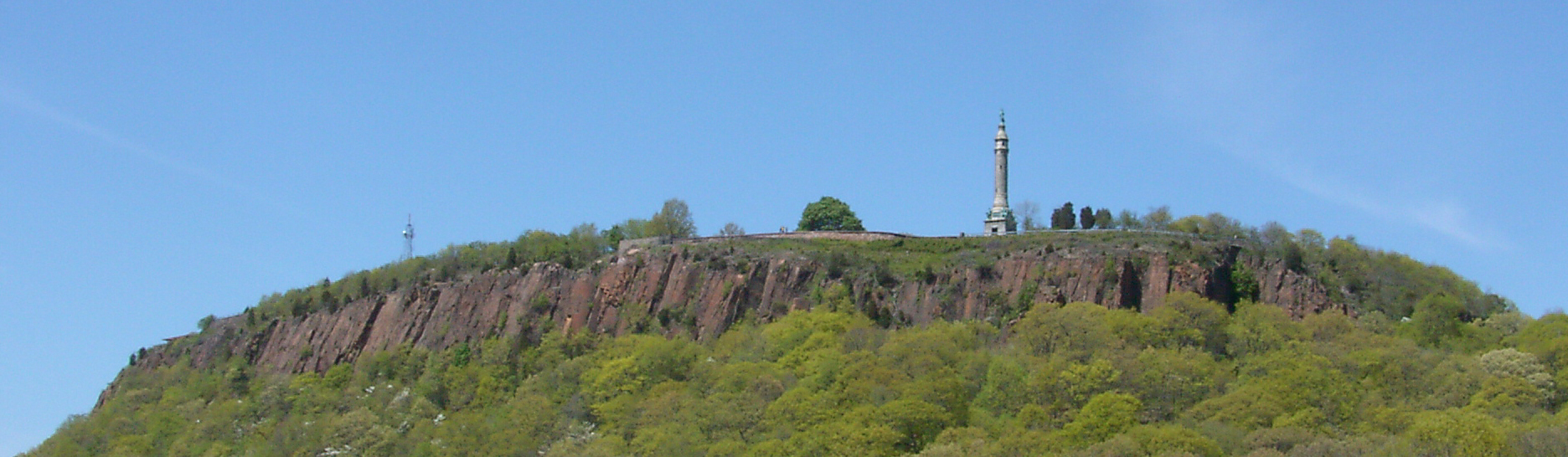
East Rock

East >

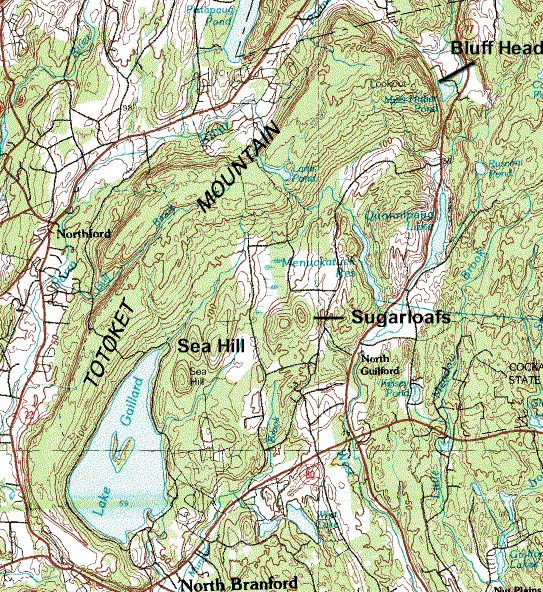
Totoket Mountain

Southeast /

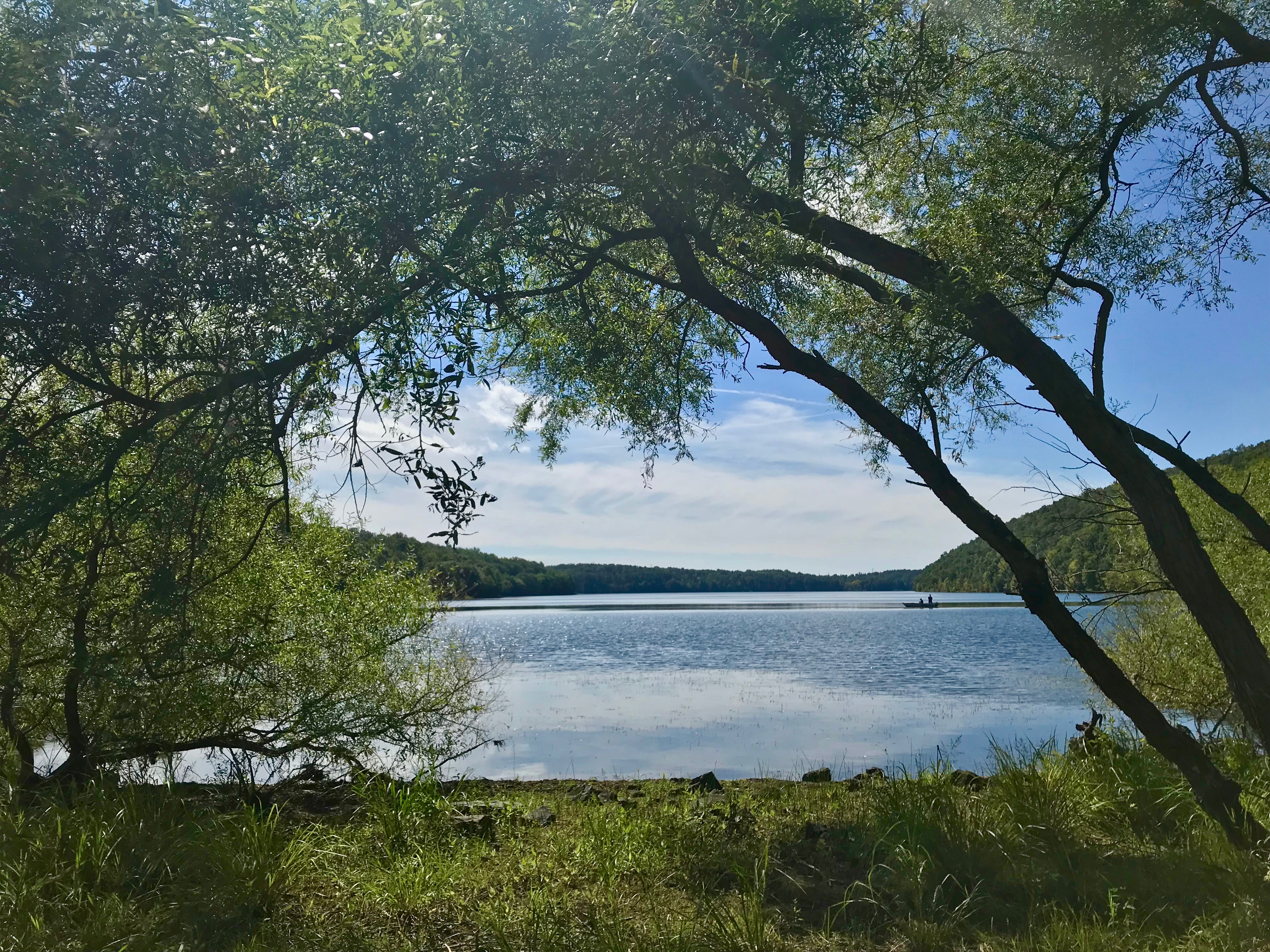
Saltonstall Mountain
