= Saltonstall Mountain =

Traprock mountain ridge in the American state of Connecticut

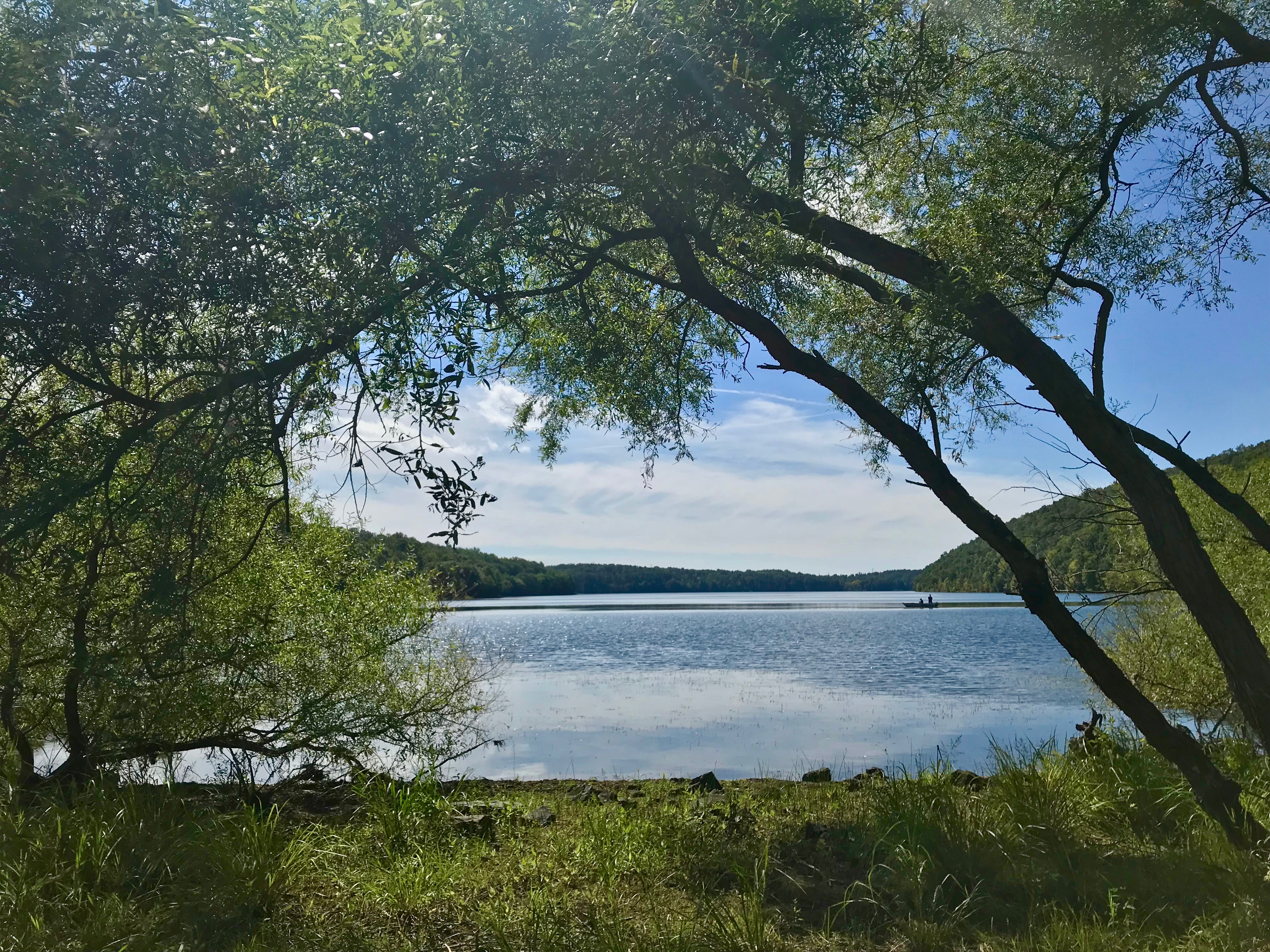
- Looking south at two men fishing from a boat in Lake Saltonstall, Saltonstall Mountain is on the right.

Highest point
- Elevation: est. 320 ft (98 m) ridge high point
- Coordinates: 41°16′44″N 72°51′42″W to 41°18′58″N 72°47′12″W

Geography
- Location: Branford, North Branford, and East Haven, Connecticut
- Parent range: Metacomet Ridge

Geology
- Rock age: 200 Ma
- Mountain type(s): Fault-block; igneous

Climbing
- Easiest route: Ridge Trail or Branford Trail

Saltonstall Mountain, also known as Saltonstall Ridge (Lonotonoquet in Quinnipiac), with a high point of (est.) 320 feet (98 m) above sea level, is a traprock mountain ridge located 3 miles (5 km) east of New Haven, Connecticut and 1.75 miles (2.8 km) north of Long Island Sound. It is part of the Metacomet Ridge that extends from Long Island Sound near New Haven, Connecticut, north through the Connecticut River Valley of Massachusetts to the Vermont border. Saltonstall Mountain is known for its 100 foot (30 m) scenic cliff faces and sharp ridgeline, unique microclimate ecosystems, rare plant communities, and for Lake Saltonstall, a 3 miles (5 km) long by 0.3 miles (400 m) wide municipal reservoir nearly enclosed by the mountain. Saltonstall Mountain is traversed by a number of hiking trails managed by the South Central Connecticut Regional Water Authority (SCCRWA) and Branford Land Trust.

== Geography ==
Saltonstall Mountain rises steeply 200 feet (61 m) above the surrounding landscape, with a high point of (est.) 320 feet (98 m). It is roughly 5.75 miles (9.3 km) long by 1.25 miles (2.0 km) wide and shaped like a hunting bow. The mountain lies within the towns of Branford, North Branford, and East Haven, Connecticut. Its western side is steepest, with vertical ledges and talus slopes, while its eastern side is lower and punctuated by hilly rises. The high point lies at the north end of the mountain; Lake Saltonstall is sandwiched in the mountain's southern arms. Beside Lake Saltonstall, the mountain shelters several other small bodies of water, including Lidyhites Pond, located in the center of the ridge north of Lake Saltonstall; Linsley Pond and Cedar Pond, located at the mountain's northern foot; and the two Branford Supply Ponds, located at the eastern foot. The Farm River runs along the western foot of the mountain. Interstate 95 cuts through the southern tip of the ridge.

The Metacomet Ridge continues north from Saltonstall Mountain as Totoket Mountain and south as Beacon Hill where the ridge terminates at Long Island Sound. To the west, the Metacomet Ridge continues from Saltonstall Mountain through urban East Haven and New Haven as a series of parallel traprock rises culminating in East Rock. An outlying peak, Peter's Rock, lies to the north-northwest of Saltonstall Mountain. The west side of Saltonstall Mountain drains into the Farm River, thence to the East Haven River and Long Island Sound; the east side into Pisgah Brook, thence into the Branford River and Long Island Sound.

== Geology and environment ==
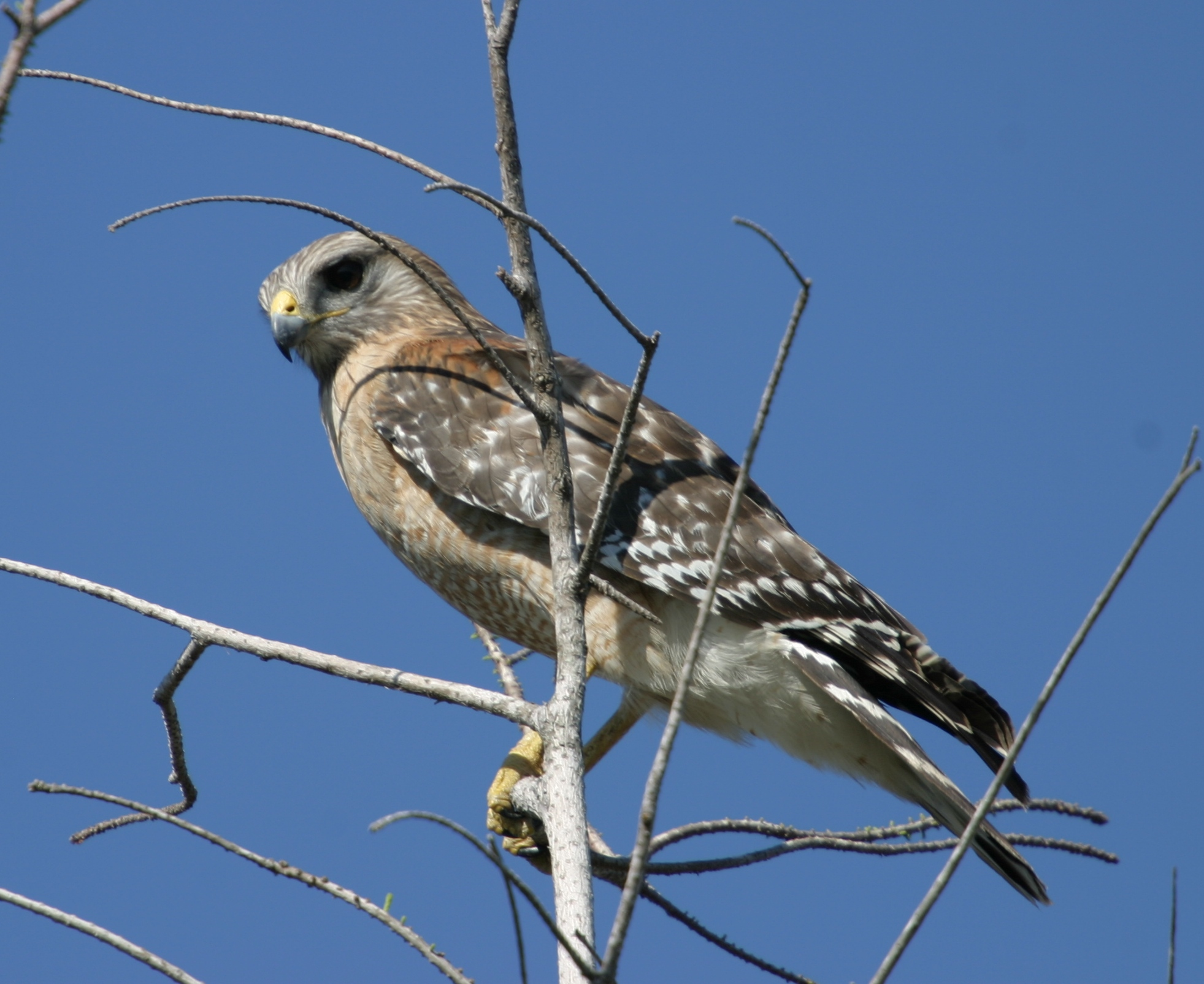
Red-shouldered hawk

Saltonstall Mountain, like much of the Metacomet Ridge, is composed of basalt, also called traprock, a volcanic rock. The mountain formed near the end of the Triassic Period with the rifting apart of the North American continent from Africa and Eurasia. Lava welled up from the rift and solidified into sheets of strata hundreds of feet thick. Subsequent faulting and earthquake activity tilted the strata, creating the cliffs and ridgeline of Saltonstall Mountain. Hot, dry upper slopes, cool, moist ravines, and mineral-rich ledges of basalt talus produce a combination of microclimate ecosystems on the mountain that support plant and animal species uncommon in greater Connecticut. Examples of rare plant and animal species (protected by the state of Connecticut) that live on Saltonstall Mountain include the eastern box turtle, red-shouldered hawk, and violet wood sorrel. Saltonstall Mountain is also an important raptor migration path. (See Metacomet Ridge for more information on the geology and ecosystem of Saltonstall Mountain).

== Conservation and recreation ==
The southern half of the mountain is protected as public watershed managed by the SCCRWA. The SCCRWA maintains a number of hiking trails and pedestrian/bicycle roads on the ridge and along the shore of Lake Saltonstall. A permit (good for a year, fee charged), available from the SCCRWA, is required to visit the property. Permitted activities on the mountain include hiking, bicycling, picnicking, snowshoeing, and other passive activities. Notable trails include an interpretive nature trail and a dead-end ridgeline trail with precipitous views to the west. The 28-mile (45 km) Branford Trail, a recreational footpath that loops around the town of Branford and visits the town's many conservation properties, passes through the east side of the SCCRWA watershed property. Fishing and boating (using the SCCRWA's boats only) are allowed on Lake Saltonstall, where the SCCRWA manages a boat rental shop and handicap accessible fishing pier in season. Swimming and dogs are prohibited, and most of the southernmost 0.5 miles (800 m) of the mountain is off limits to the public.

The northern half of the mountain is surrounded by suburban subdivisions; a few reach to parts of the ridgeline. Nonetheless, the Branford Land Trust and the town of Branford manage 800 acres (3.2 km^{2}) of protected open space on the north summit and adjoining parts of the mountain. The Branford Trail crosses through these properties. Passive activities such as hiking and picnicking are encouraged. The town of East Haven maintains open frontage on the Farm River at the west base of Saltonstall Mountain where fishing is allowed.

=== Trailheads ===
The SSCRWA parking lots are located off Hoseley Avenue, 1.9 miles (3.1 km) north of U.S. Route 1 in Branford. A permit is required to park and use the trails or lake. There are two parking areas for the Branford Trail. The first is located on Laurel Hill Road via Brushy Hill Road, 1.25 miles (2.0 km) north of its junction with Route 1. The second is located on Northford Avenue via Mill Plain Road, 1.2 miles (1.9 km) north of Route 1. Three parking lots for the Branford Supply Ponds trails are located on Chestnut Street and its extension, Short Rocks Road, 0.3 miles (0.5 km) north of Route 1. Permits are not required to use the Branford Trail and Branford Supply Ponds parking areas.

== See also ==
- Lake Saltonstall
- Metacomet Ridge
- Adjacent summits:

↓ South
Beacon Hill
(no image)
North ↑

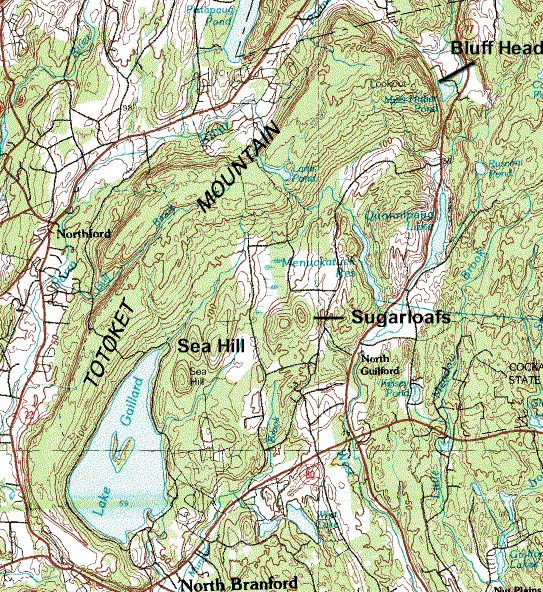
Totoket Mountain

North ↑

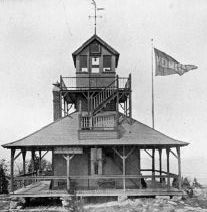
Peter's Rock

< West

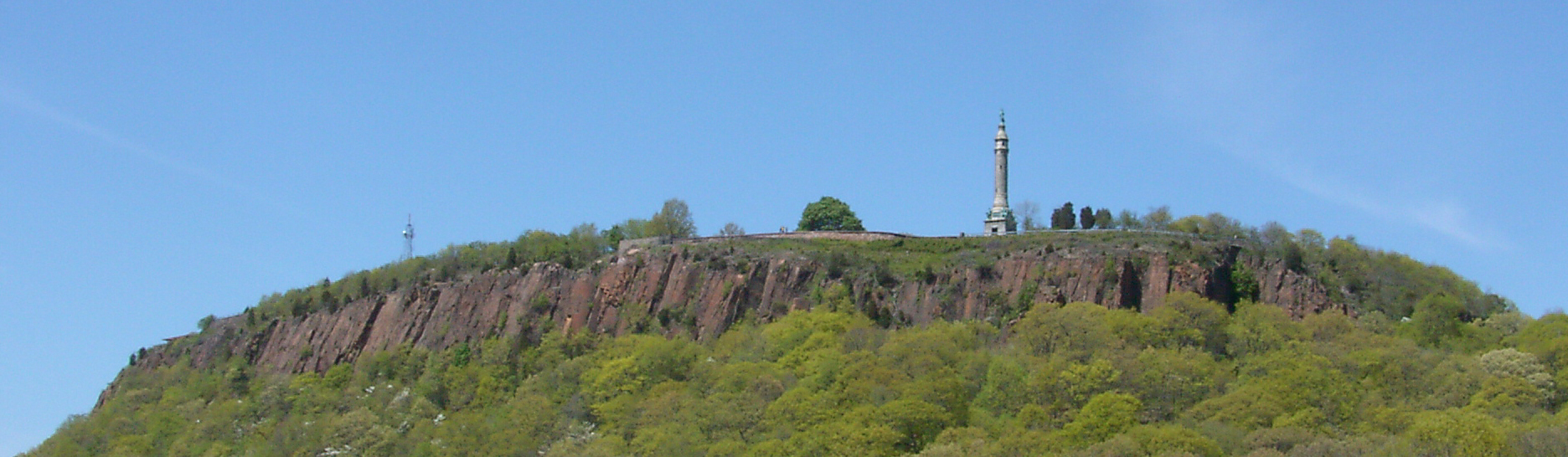
East Rock
