= Lithoprotection =

Term where rock cover in a habitat provides a diversity of local wildlife

Lithoprotection is a term introduced in 2001 by Armenian biologist Tigran Tadevosyan as the name for the phenomenon where rock cover of a habitat diversifies local wildlife.

== Etymology ==
The word "lithoprotection" originates from the Greek root "lithos", meaning "stone", and the Latin root "protectus", meaning "to cover".

== Definition ==
Originally an existence of a lithoprotection had been proposed based on observations of increased plant and animal diversity in habitats with rock cover compared to habitats without rock cover in the same conditions of an arid climate and steep slopes (Safarian, 1960; Tadevosyan, 2001). To explain this phenomenon, the author compared the life forms of plants, and the body sizes and escape strategies of animals inhabiting habitats with and without rock cover (Tadevosyan, 2001 - 2002). His conclusion was that many groups of vascular plants, including trees, shrubs, succulents, ferns, and moss species, linked to rocky substrates because they require higher than an area's average soil humidity, sometimes being shaded by a solid piece of rock, as well as strong attachment to the substrate. On the other hand, many relatively large animals (including larger lizards, snakes, some mammals and many bird species) need habitats with a dense network of shelters created by crevices and spaces between rocks in order survive overheating and predation. Thus, due to its ability to prevent the evaporation of humidity from the soil, to catch the seeds of plants, to hold trees and shrubs securely to the ground and to serve as a network of efficient shelters for many animals and shade-loving plants, rock cover lithoprotection is being considered as a protective element of a habitat biodiversity.

== Conservation ==
Managing lithoprotection may be used as a measure of managing wildlife. Removal of a lithoprotection by cleaning an area of stone and rocks is a common practice in an urban landscape development. Because a lack of lithoprotection is equal to decreased biodiversity, this practice can be considered one of the core mechanisms of biodiversity loss in urban landscapes. Adding lithoprotection in contrary typically attracts wildlife and helps diversify and maintain biodiversity of a landscape (Tadevosyan, 2001). Bright examples of artificial use of lithoprotection are attractive rockeries, Japanese rock garden and other elements of a garden design.
