= Trap rock =

Dark-colored, fine-grained, non-granitic igneous rock

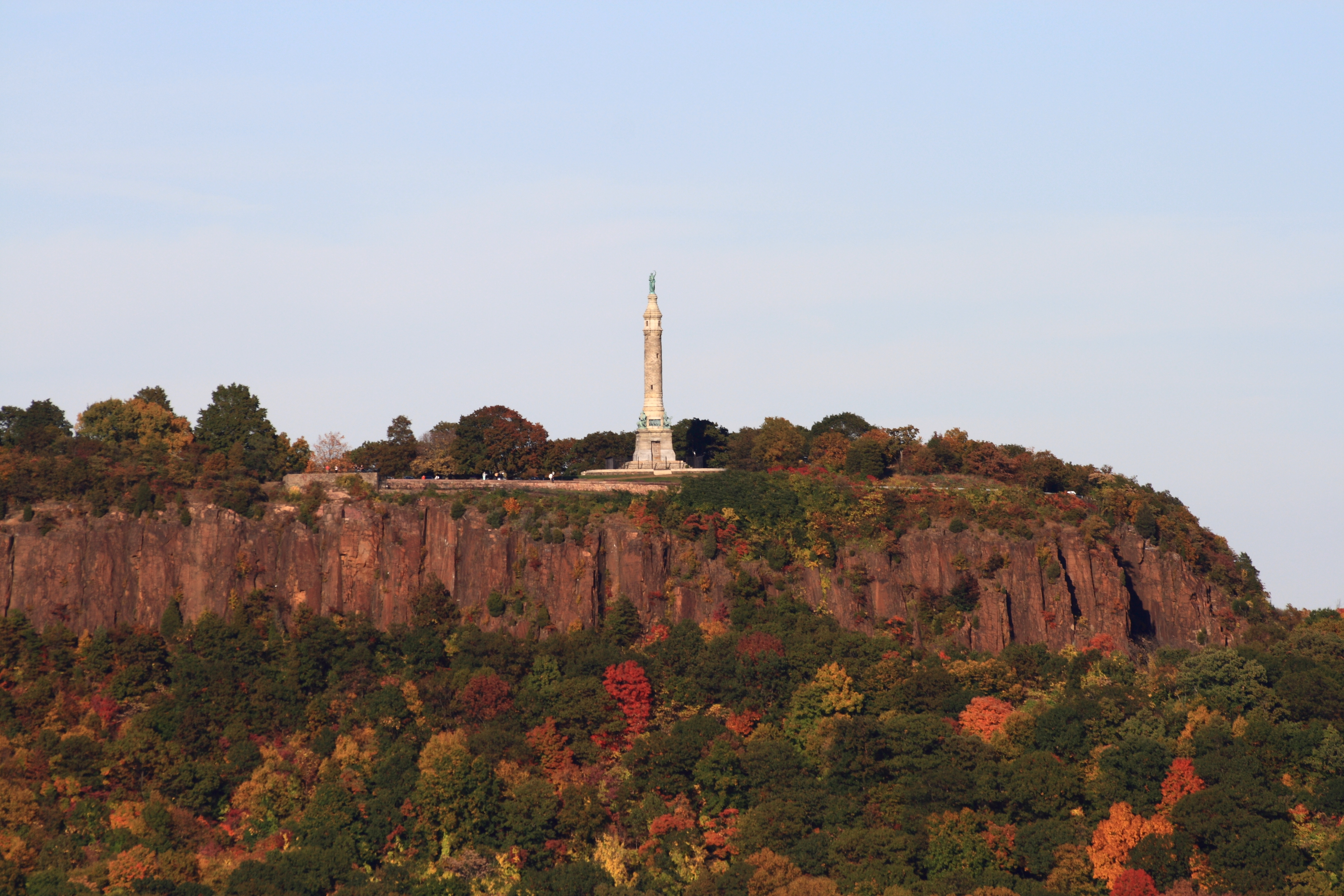
The East Rock trap rock ridge overlooking New Haven, Connecticut, U.S.

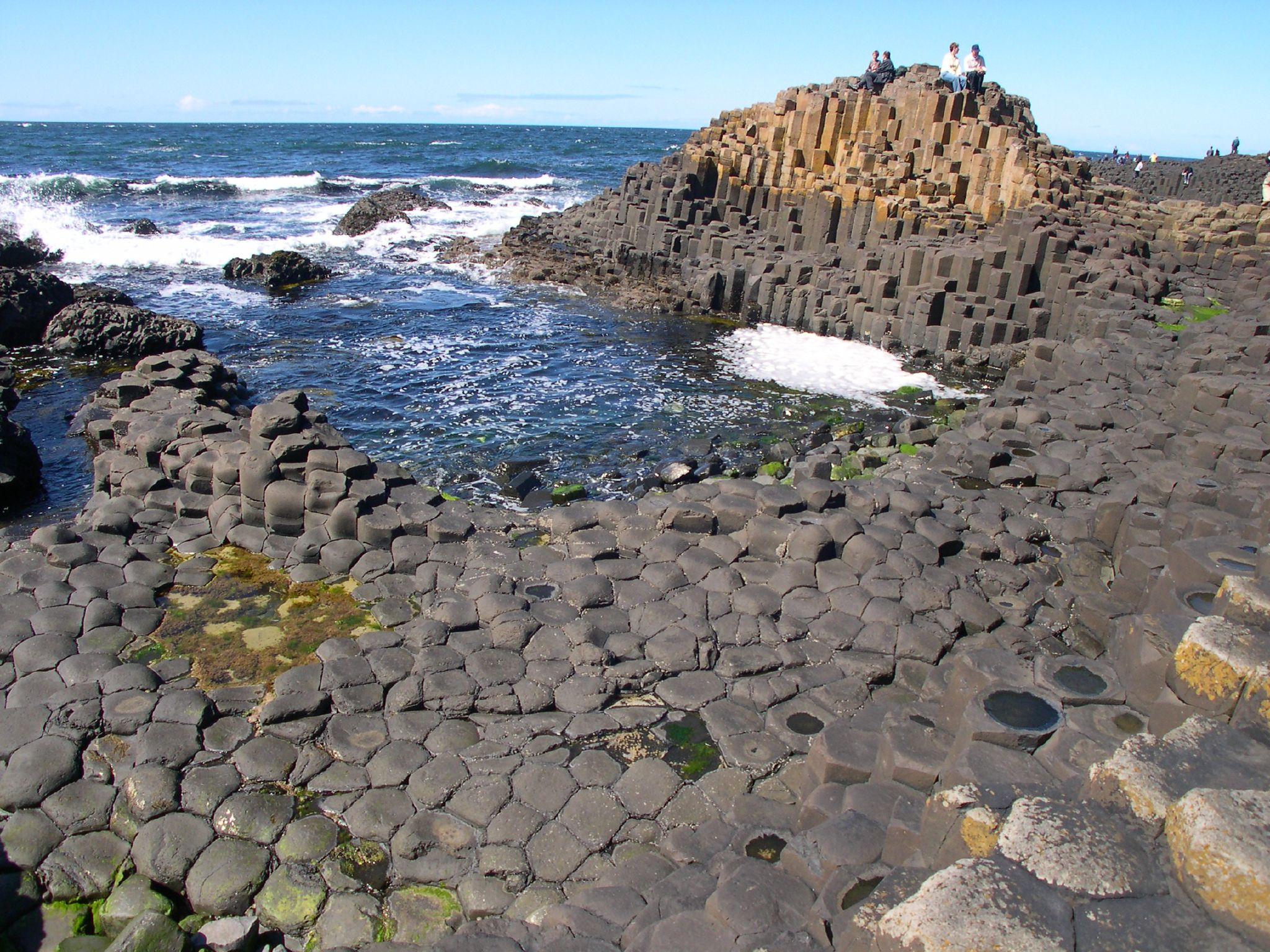
Trap rock forming a characteristic pavement, Giant's Causeway, Northern Ireland

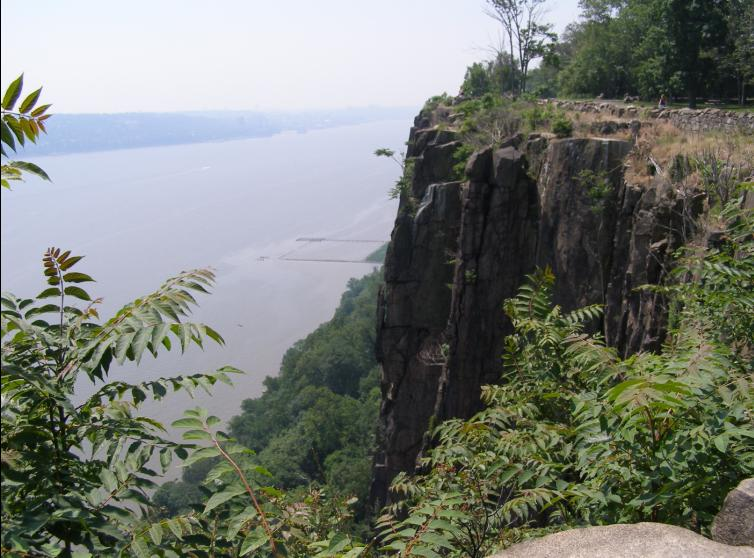
Trap rock cliff overlooking the Hudson River from an overlook on the Hudson Palisades in Bergen County, New Jersey, U.S.

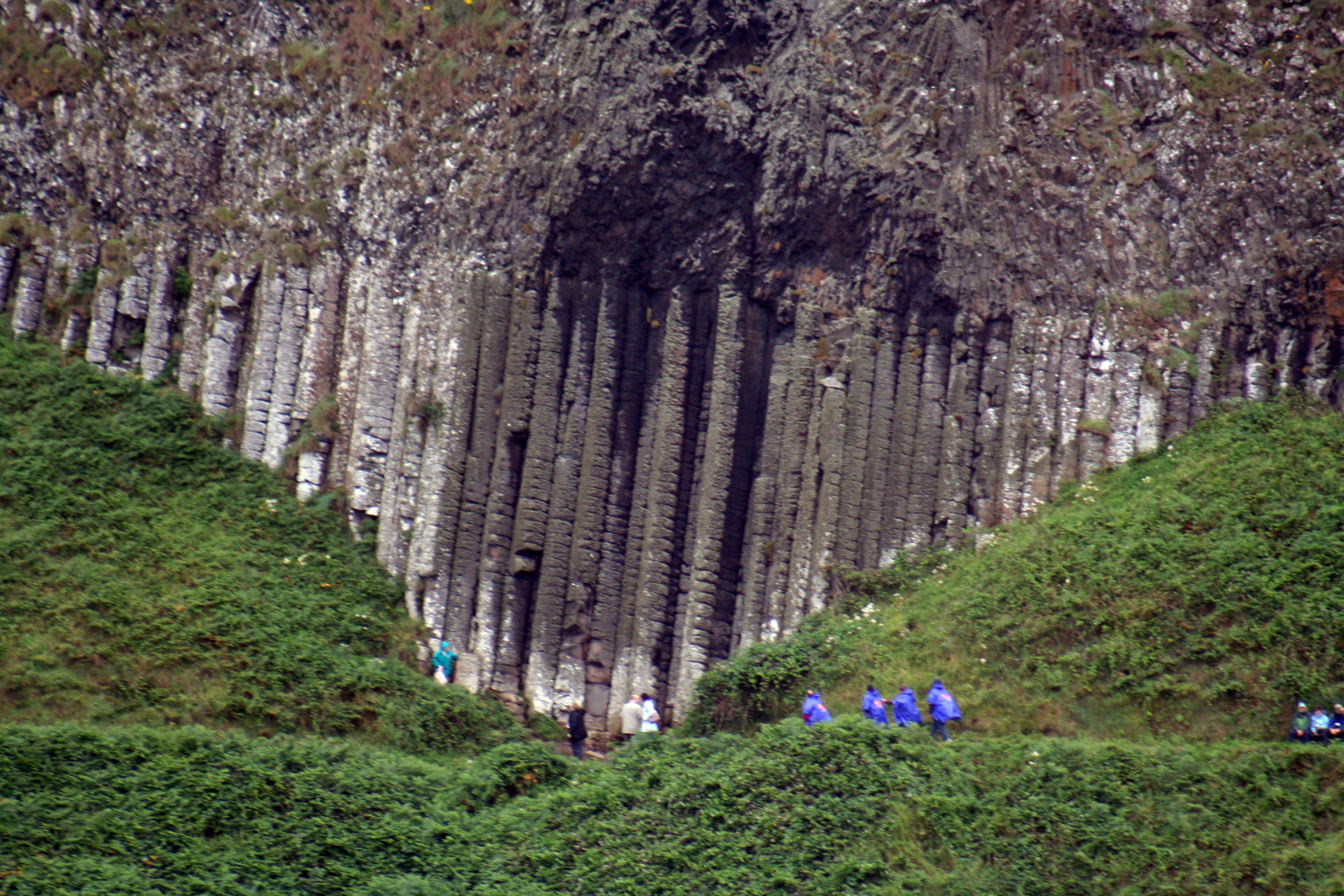
Trap rock forming a characteristic stockade wall, Giant's Causeway, Northern Ireland

Trap rock, also known as either trapp or trap, is any dark-colored, fine-grained, non-granitic intrusive or extrusive igneous rock. Types of trap rock include basalt, peridotite, diabase, and gabbro. Trap is also used to refer to flood (plateau) basalts, such as the Deccan Traps and Siberian Traps. The erosion of trap rock created by the stacking of successive lava flows often creates a distinct stairstep landscape from which the term trap was derived from the Swedish word trappa, which means "stairs".

The slow cooling of magma either as a sill or as a thick lava flow sometimes creates systematic vertical fractures within the resulting layer of trap rock. These fractures often form rock columns that are typically hexagonal but could be four- to eight-sided.

== Uses ==
Trap rock has a variety of uses. A major use for basalt is crushed stone for road and housing construction in concrete, macadam, and paving stones. Because of its insensitivity to chemical influences, resistance to mechanical stress, high dry relative density, frost resistance, and seawater resistance, trap rock is used as ballast for railroad track bed and hydraulic engineering rock (riprap) in coast and bank protection for paving embankments. It is also used for the production of cast rock that is used in corrosion and abrasion protection, such as for sewage pipes.

Other uses include gardening and landscaping, millstones, mineral wool, as a flux in ceramic masses and glazes, for the production of glass ceramics, crushed as a filter aggregate (air filtration of poison gas) in ABC bunkers, as filter bed material at water treatment facilities, and ground as a soil improvement product. Trap rock has been used to construct buildings and churches: Trinity Church on the Green with trap rock quarried from Eli Whitney's quarry is a particularly colorful example of a red-orange-brown-colored, natural-faced trap rock.

== Examples ==
Well-known examples of outcropping trap rock include both intrusive sills and extrusive lava flows. They include the Palisades Sill, a Triassic, 200-Ma diabase intrusion that forms The Palisades along 80 kilometers (50 mi) of the Hudson River in New York and New Jersey. Vast areas of trap rock in the form of thick lava flows and other volcanic rocks comprise the Deccan Traps of India and Siberian Traps of Russia.

Other prominent basalt ridges, mountains, buttes, canyons, and other landscape features include:

- In North America:
  - The ridges and cliffs of the Columbia River Gorge in Oregon and Washington. Behind Latourell Falls are columns of trap rock.
  - Basalt Mountain near Basalt, Colorado.
  - The Metacomet Ridge of Connecticut and Massachusetts.
  - The Watchung Mountains of New Jersey
  - Devils Postpile National Monument and other parts of California's inner coastal range.
  - Most of the Hawaiian Islands and their mountains are composed of basalt or similar volcanic rock.
  - The Green Gardens region of Gros Morne National Park in Newfoundland
- The Emeishan Traps in China
- Giant's Causeway in Ireland
- Organ Pipes National Park in Australia
- The Paraná and Etendeka Traps of Brazil
- The island of Surtsey in Iceland, a new (1963) volcanic island.
- The Vilyuy Traps of Russia

== See also ==
- List of flood basalt provinces
