= Chauncey Peak =

Traprock mountain in Connecticut, U.S.

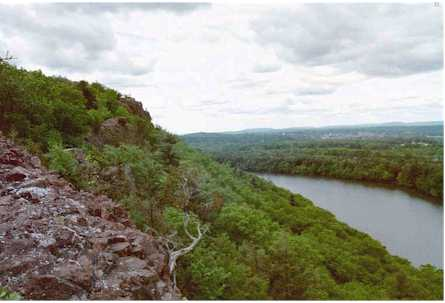
- Cliffs of Chauncey Peak above Crescent Lake

Highest point
- Elevation: 688 ft (210 m)
- Parent peak: 41° 33' 31"N, 72° 45' 34"W
- Coordinates: 41°33′31″N 72°45′34″W

Geography
- Location: Meriden, Connecticut
- Parent range: Metacomet Ridge

Geology
- Rock age: 200 Ma
- Mountain type(s): Fault-block; igneous

Climbing
- Easiest route: Mattabesett Trail

Chauncey Peak, 688 feet (210 m), is a traprock mountain located 2 miles (3 km) northeast of the center of Meriden, Connecticut. It is part of the narrow, linear Metacomet Ridge that extends from Long Island Sound near New Haven, Connecticut, north through the Connecticut River Valley of Massachusetts to the Vermont border. Chauncey Peak is known for its scenic vistas, vertical cliff faces overlooking the Bradley Hubbard Reservoir, unique microclimate ecosystems, and rare plant communities. It rises steeply 400 feet (120 m) above the city of Meriden to the south with west-facing cliffs that plunge into Crescent Lake 300 feet (91 m) below. The mountain is traversed by the 50-mile (80 km) Mattabesett Trail.

== Geography ==
Roughly 0.75 miles (1.2 km) in diameter, Chauncey Peak is located within the town of Meriden, Connecticut. Although Chauncey Peak is described by some sources as part of Lamentation Mountain, it rises more than 300 feet (91 m) above the common gap between the two, making it its own mountain by regional standards (see Four-thousand footers). Crescent Lake, (formerly called Bradley Hubbard Reservoir), lies nestled between Lamentation Mountain and Chauncey Peak. The lake provides emergency drinking water to the city of Meriden. Much of the east side of the mountain has been subject to quarrying; as of 2007, the quarry was .5 mi (.8 km) wide, roughly 3/4 the width of the entire mountain. Interstate 91 cuts through the gap between Higby Mountain and Chauncey Peak to the north.

The Metacomet Ridge continues north from Chauncey Peak to become Lamentation Mountain and south to become Higby Mountain. The western half of Chauncey Peak drains into the Quinnipiac River, then to Long Island Sound; the eastern half to the Mattabesett River, thence to the Connecticut River and Long Island Sound.

== Geology and environment ==
The origin of Chauncey Peak and the Metacomet Ridge dates back 200 million years ago with the rifting apart of North America from Eurasia in the process that would ultimately create the Atlantic Ocean. In the area that is now the Metacomet Ridge and surrounding sedimentary rock basin, massive basalt (traprock) lava flows spread across the prehistoric rift valley, some of them several hundred feet thick, over a period of 20 million years. Sediment accumulated between lava flows and lithified into sedimentary rock. After the rifting processes ceased, layers of strata faulted and tilted upward. Subsequent erosion, glaciation, and uplift exposed the weather resistant edge of the traprock lava sheets, creating the cliffline of the Metacomet Ridge as it is today. The mineral content and the shape of the ridge make possible a variety of microclimate ecosystems. Hot and dry cliff faces support plant and animal species uncommon so far north. Deeply gouged ravines support cooler climate species found in more northerly climes, while gradual backslope environments support species typical of the surrounding latitude. Talus slopes beneath cliffs accumulate minerals that support alkaline-loving plant species uncommon in surrounding acidic southern New England. Extensive cliffs provide ideal habitat and important migration corridors for raptor species.

== Recreation and conservation ==
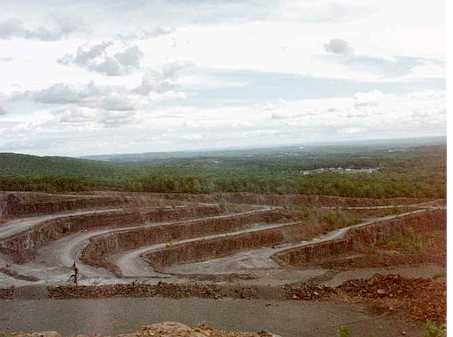
Quarry on the east side of Chauncey Peak. 2000 photo; more rock has been removed since.

The west side of Chauncey Peak lies within Giuffrida Park, managed by the city of Meriden. The park boasts a lake, golf course, woodlands, and the rocky peaks of Lamentation Mountain and Chauncey Peak. Permitted activities within the park include hiking, snowshoeing, cross-country skiing, picnicking, and bicycling. Swimming, boating, rock climbing, and fishing are prohibited. The park supports a number of trails, most notably the Mattabesett Trail (maintained by the Connecticut Forest and Park Association), which stretches from the northern end of Lamentation Mountain, south to Totoket Mountain and north again to the Connecticut River. Trailhead parking for Chauncey Peak is located at Giufridda Park on Westfield Road, 1.2 miles (1.9 km) east of its junction with U.S. Route 5 and 1.8 miles (2.9 km) west of Interstate 91, exit 20, via Country Club Road (which becomes Westfield Road).

The ecosystem and ridgeline of Chauncey Peak is most threatened by quarrying, although the west side of the peak, within Giuffrida Park, is protected. In 2000, Chauncey Peak was included in a study by the National Park Service for the designation of a new National Scenic Trail now tentatively called the New England National Scenic Trail, which would include the Metacomet-Monadnock Trail in Massachusetts and the Mattabesett Trail and Metacomet Trail trails in Connecticut.

== See also ==
- Metacomet Ridge
- Adjacent summits:

↓ South

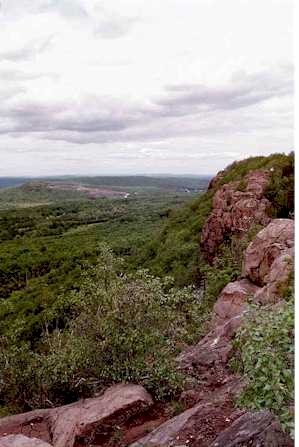
Higby Mountain

North ↑

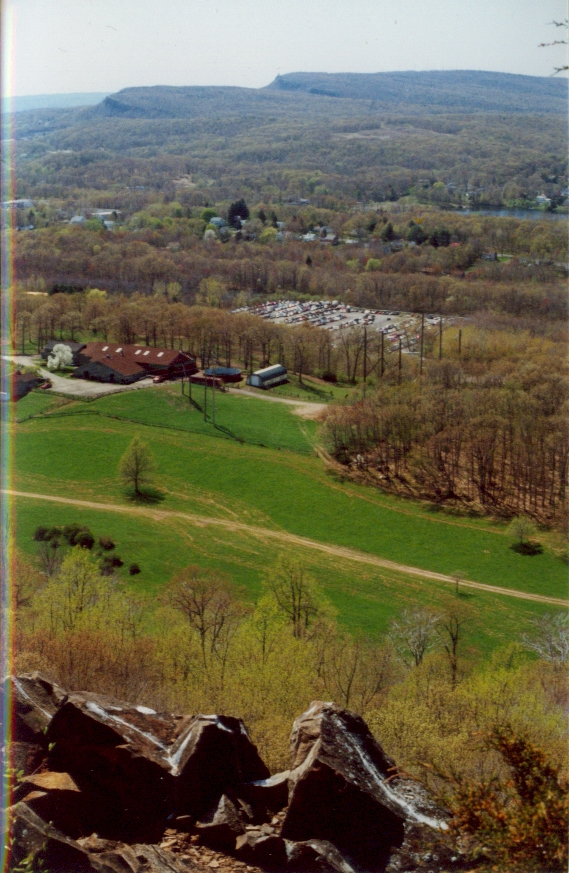
Lamentation Mountain
