= Besek Mountain =

Mountain in United States of America

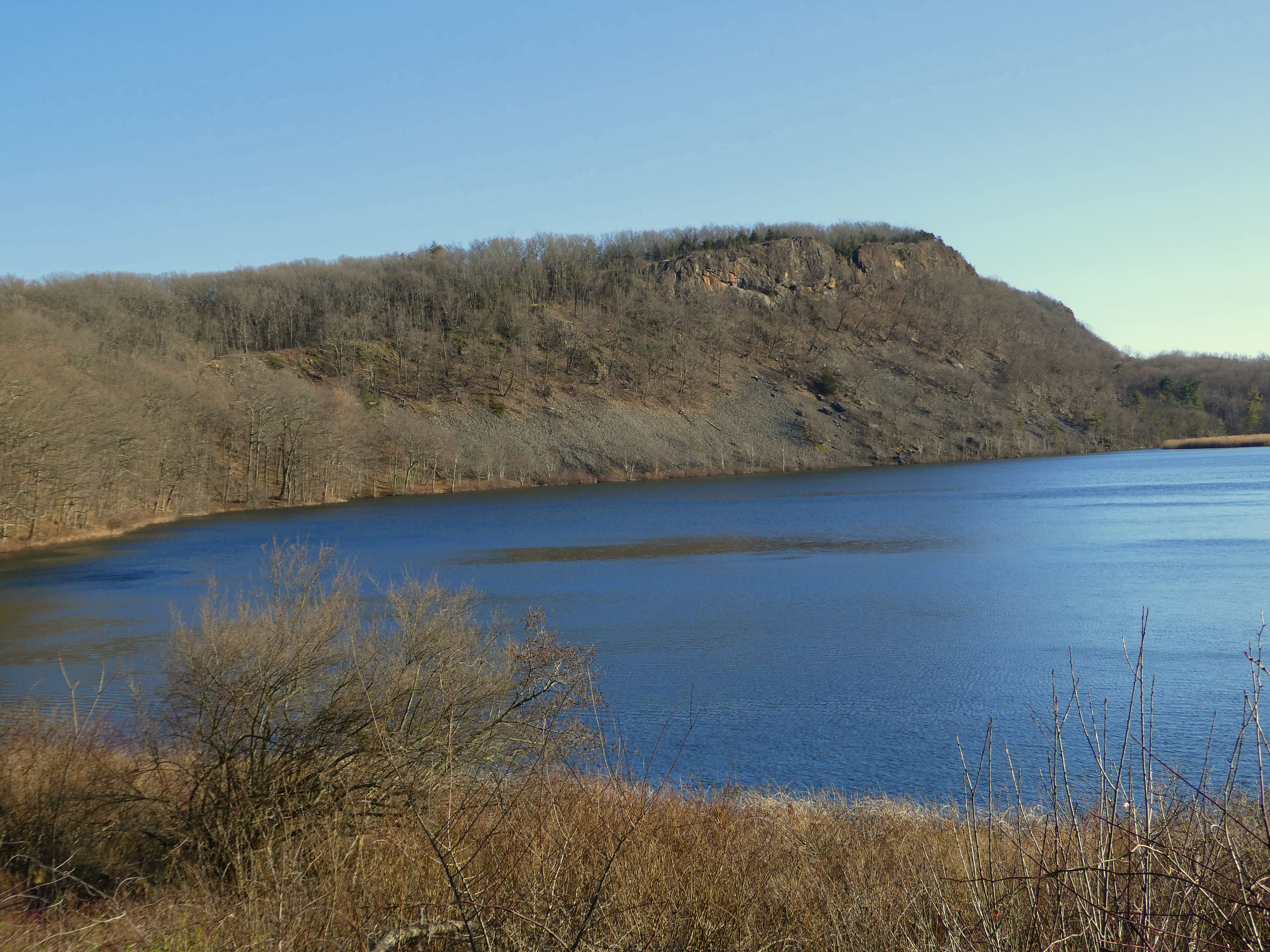
- Besek Mountain and Black Pond in March 2023

Highest point
- Elevation: c. 840 feet (256 m) (ridge high point)
- Coordinates: 41°30′48″N 72°44′45″W

Geography
- Location within Connecticut
- Location: Durham, Meriden, Middlefield, and Wallingford, Connecticut
- Parent range: Metacomet Ridge

Geology
- Rock age: 200 Ma
- Mountain type(s): Fault-block; igneous

Climbing
- Easiest route: Mattabesett Trail

Besek Mountain (Alternate spelling: Bessic Mountain) also known as Black Mountain, est. 840 feet (260 m), is a traprock mountain ridge located 4.75 miles (7.6 km) southeast of Meriden, Connecticut. It is part of the narrow, linear Metacomet Ridge that extends from Long Island Sound near New Haven, Connecticut, north through the Connecticut River Valley of Massachusetts to the Vermont border. Besek Mountain is known for its 3-mile (4.8 km) long line of open cliffs, unique microclimate ecosystems, and rare plant communities. The mountain is traversed by the 51-mile (82 km) Mattabesett Trail, and is home to the Powder Ridge Ski Area.

== Geography ==
According to the Connecticut Forest and Park Association, the word "Besek" is a corruption of "Besett", a Native American word for "black." Besek Mountain, 4 miles (6.4 km) long by 0.75 miles (1.2 km) wide, with a 200–300-foot (60–90 m) high continuous 3-mile (5 km) long cliffline visible for miles, is located in Meriden, Middlefield, and Wallingford, Connecticut; its lower southeast slope is located in Durham, Connecticut.

Considered particularly scenic is Black Pond, located on the northwest side of the mountain. Cliffs and talus slopes plunge 200 feet (61 m) into the pond from the ridgeline. Other bodies of water on the mountain include the developed Besek Lake on the east side of the mountain, and the lower end of the Mount Higby Reservoir on the north side. Powder Ridge Ski Area is located on the east side of the mountain and extends to the summit. The northeast side of the mountain is occupied by a housing development, which reaches to the ridgeline. Powder Ridge or Powder Hill, 550 feet (170 m), forms the lower, eastern tier of Besek Mountain beneath the ski area. Powder Ridge is dominated by apple orchards and agricultural fields, and is traversed by Powder Hill Road; the ridge offers expansive views to the east over the Connecticut River Valley, and is a popular local scenic drive.

The Metacomet Ridge continues north from Besek Mountain as Higby Mountain and south as Trimountain. The east side of Besek Mountain drains into the Coginchaug River, thence to the Connecticut River and Long Island Sound; the southwest side drains into the Muddy River, thence into the Quinnipiac River and Long Island Sound; and the northwest side into Harbor Brook, thence into the Quinnipiac River.

== Geology and ecology ==
Besek Mountain, like much of the Metacomet Ridge, is composed of basalt, also called traprock, a volcanic rock. The mountain formed near the end of the Triassic Period with the rifting apart of the North American continent from Africa and Eurasia. Lava welled up from the rift and solidified into sheets of strata hundreds of feet thick. Subsequent faulting and earthquake activity tilted the strata, creating the cliffs and ridgeline of Besek Mountain. Hot, dry upper slopes, cool, moist ravines, and mineral-rich ledges of basalt talus produce a combination of microclimate ecosystems on the mountain that support plant and animal species uncommon in greater Connecticut. Besek Mountain is also an important raptor migration path. (See Metacomet Ridge for more information on the geology and ecosystem of Besek Mountain).

== Conservation and Recreation ==
Activities enjoyed on Besek Mountain include hiking, picnicking, snowshoeing, and other passive pursuits. Downhill skiing, snowboarding, and snow tubing are offered at the Powder Ridge Ski Area. Fishing and boating are allowed on Black Pond. The mountain is traversed by the Mattabesett Trail (maintained by the Connecticut Forest and Park Association), which stretches from the northern end of Lamentation Mountain, south to Totoket Mountain and north again to the Connecticut River. A trailhead for the Mattabesett Trail on Besek Mountain is located just west of the junction of Connecticut Route 68 and Connecticut Route 157 in Reeds Gap between Trimountain and Besek Mountain, 3 miles (5 km) west of Durham center. Black Pond can be accessed via a small parking lot off East Main Street in Meriden, 1.2 miles (1.9 km) east of Connecticut Route 15. The mountain may also be accessed via the parking area for Higby Mountain on Connecticut Route 66, just east of Black Pond, and via the ski slopes of the Powder Ridge Ski Area on Powder Hill Road in western Middlefield. Black Pond, undeveloped and scenic, is part of the Black Pond Wildlife Management Area.

The Powder Ridge Ski area, in operation for 47 years, went up for sale in 2007 after the owner was forced into bankruptcy. A Middlefield town referendum in April 2007 to buy the Powder Ridge property was voted in favor, 1,097 to 151 votes. Residents have authorized the town to bid up to $2.85 million for purchase of the property, however, due to legal complications, the sale has been postponed. In December 2007, the Powder Ridge Ski Area website indicated that the ski area was closed. In 2012, the ski park was sold to the owner of Brownstone Exploration & Discovery Park in nearby Portland, Connecticut, and was reopened as Powder Ridge Mountain Park & Resort in December 2013.

Besek Mountain, its habitat, and access to its ridgeline are most threatened by potential development. In 2000, Besek Mountain was included in a study by the National Park Service for the designation of a new National Scenic Trail now tentatively called the New England National Scenic Trail, which would include the Metacomet-Monadnock Trail in Massachusetts and the Mattabesett Trail and Metacomet Trail in Connecticut.

The Wallingford Land Trust and the Middlesex Land Trust are active conservation partners in the area.

== Historic events ==
The infamous aborted Powder Ridge Rock Festival was to be held on Besek Mountain July 30, August 1 and August 2, 1970 at Powder Ridge Ski Area. A legal injunction forced the event to be cancelled just a few days before it was to begin, keeping the musicians away; but a crowd of 30,000 attendees arrived anyway, to find no food, no entertainment, no adequate plumbing, and at least seventy drug pushers.

== See also ==
- Metacomet Ridge
- Adjacent summits:

↓ South

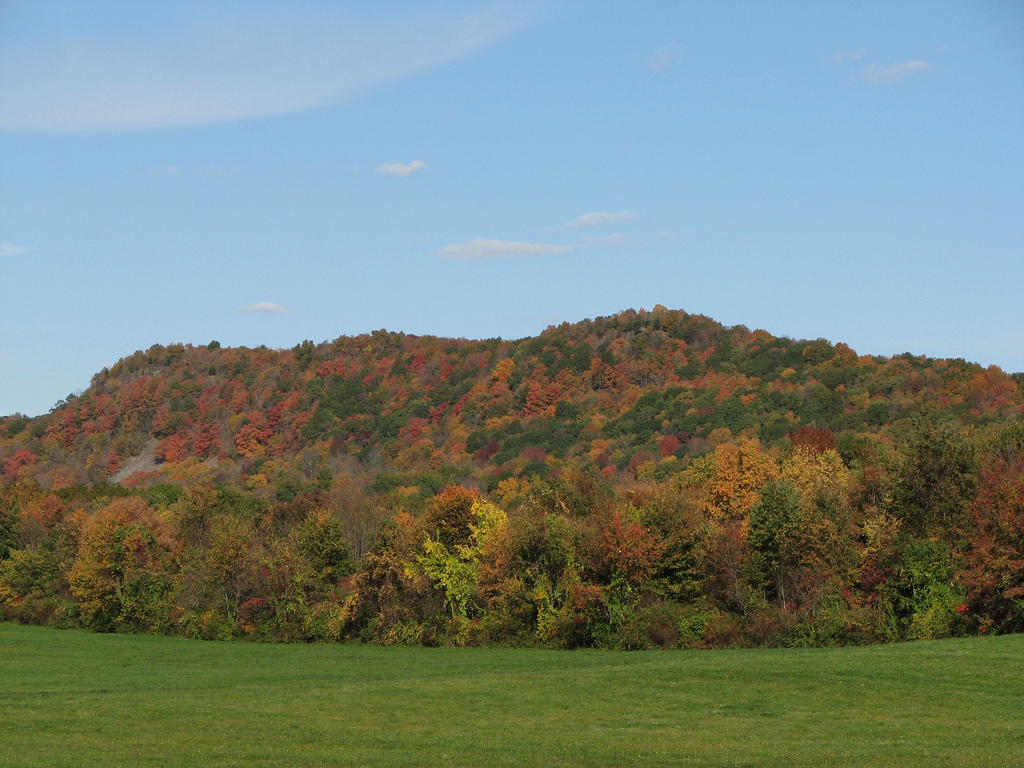
Trimountain

North ↑

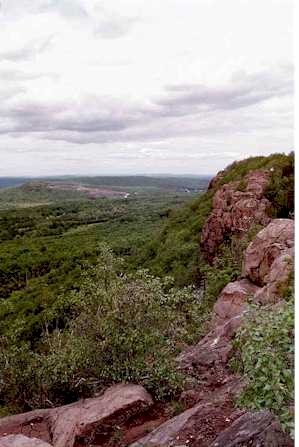
Higby Mountain
