= Trimountain =

Mountain in the American state of Connecticut

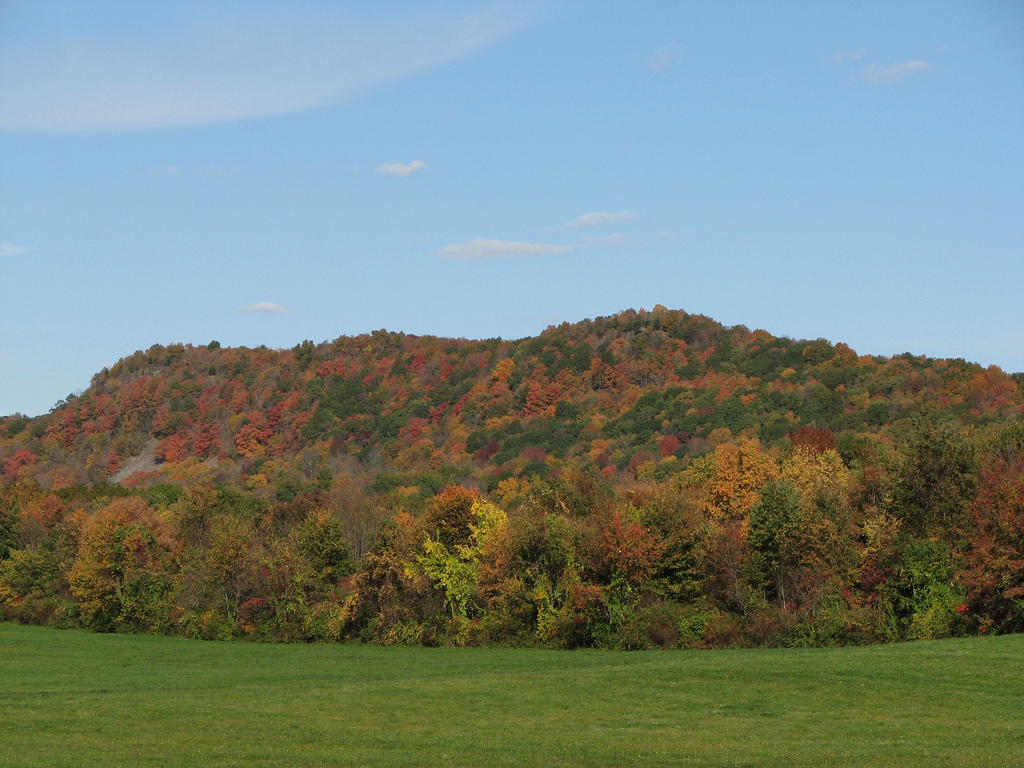
- Trimountain west facing side

Highest point
- Elevation: (est.) 760 ft (230 m)
- Parent peak: 41° 27' 37"N, 72° 44' 10"W
- Coordinates: 41°27′37″N 72°44′10″W

Geography
- Location: Durham and Wallingford, Connecticut
- Parent range: Metacomet Ridge

Geology
- Rock age: 200 Ma
- Mountain type(s): Fault-block; igneous

Climbing
- Easiest route: Mattabesett Trail

Trimountain or Tri-mountain, est. 760 feet (230 m), is a traprock mountain located 6 miles (10 km) southeast of Meriden, Connecticut. It is part of the narrow, linear Metacomet Ridge that extends from Long Island Sound near New Haven, Connecticut, north through the Connecticut River Valley of Massachusetts to the Vermont border. Trimountain is known for its scenic cliff faces, unique microclimate ecosystems, and rare plant communities. The mountain is traversed by the 51-mile (82 km) Mattabesett Trail.

== Geography ==
Trimountain is located in Durham and Wallingford, Connecticut. It takes its name from its overall triangular shape, its three southern pinnacles, and the three notches between the pinnacles. A prominent landscape feature that rises 500 feet (150 m) above the surrounding valleys, Trimountain is roughly 1.5 miles (2.4 km) long by 1 mile (1.6 km) wide, although the steepness of the terrain makes the actual square mileage much larger. Although Trimountain has been subject to intensive quarrying, which has obliterated much of the northwestern face of the mountain, the Mattabesett Trail still traverses the southern pinnacles and the wooded eastern side of the mountain.

The Metacomet Ridge continues north from Trimountain as Besek Mountain and south as Fowler Mountain. The east side of Trimountain drains into the Coginchaug River, thence to the Connecticut River and Long Island Sound; the west side drains into the Muddy River, thence into the Quinnipiac River and Long Island Sound.

== Geology and ecology ==
Trimountain, like much of the Metacomet Ridge, is composed of basalt, also called traprock, a volcanic rock. The mountain formed near the end of the Triassic Period with the rifting apart of the North American continent from Africa and Eurasia. Lava welled up from the rift and solidified into sheets of strata hundreds of feet thick. Subsequent faulting and earthquake activity tilted the strata, creating the cliffs and ridgeline of Trimountain. Hot, dry upper slopes, cool, moist ravines, and mineral-rich ledges of basalt talus produce a combination of microclimate ecosystems on the mountain that support plant and animal species uncommon in greater Connecticut. Trimountain is also an important raptor migration path. (See Metacomet Ridge for more information on the geology and ecosystem of Trimountain).

== Conservation and recreation ==
Trimountain is used for hiking, cross country skiing, and snowshoeing. The mountain is traversed by the 50-mile (80 km) Mattabesett Trail (maintained by the Connecticut Forest and Park Association), which stretches from the northern end of Lamentation Mountain, south to Totoket Mountain and north again to the Connecticut River. Trimountain State Park, and undeveloped property, is located on the southeastern side of the mountain. A trailhead for the Mattabesett Trail on Trimountain is located at the junction of Connecticut Route 68 and Connecticut Route 157 in Reeds Gap between Trimountain and Besek Mountain, 3 miles (5 km) west of Durham center.

The ridgeline of Trimountain and its ecosystem is most threatened by quarrying and suburban development. The quarry on the western side of the mountain was approximately 0.75 by 0.8 miles (1,210 by 1,290 m) as of 2007.

In 2000, Trimountain was included in a study by the National Park Service for the designation of a new National Scenic Trail now tentatively called the New England National Scenic Trail, which would include the Metacomet-Monadnock Trail in Massachusetts and the Mattabesett Trail and Metacomet Trail trails in Connecticut.

The Wallingford Land Trust and the Middlesex Land Trust have been active in conserving the viewshed of Trimountain.

== See also ==
- Metacomet Ridge
- Adjacent summits:

↓ South

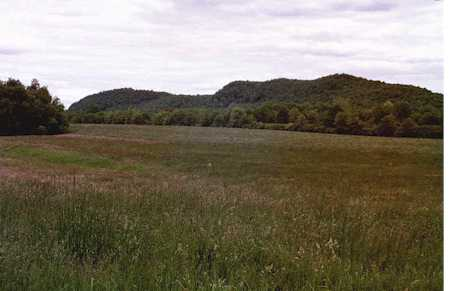
Fowler Mountain

North ↑

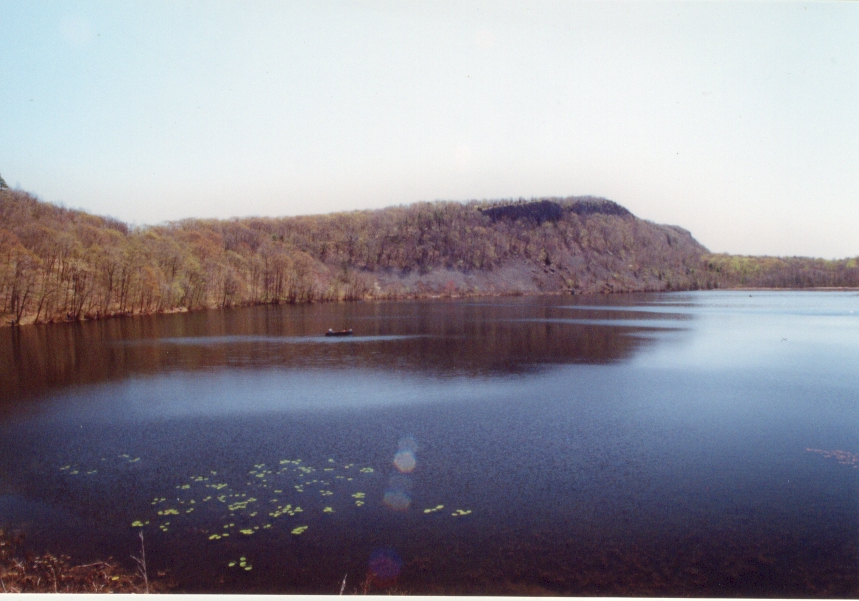
Besek Mountain
