= Higby Mountain =

Traprock mountain in the American state of Connecticut

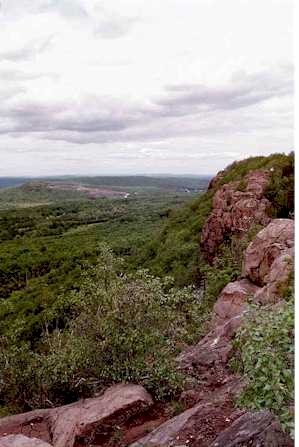
- Ledges of Higby Mountain

Highest point
- Elevation: est. 892 ft (272 m) (ridge high point)
- Coordinates: 41°34′02″N 72°43′28″W to 41°31′49″N 72°44′37″W

Geography
- Location: Middletown, Meriden, and Middlefield
- Parent range: Metacomet Ridge

Geology
- Rock age: 200 Ma
- Mountain type(s): Fault-block; igneous

Climbing
- Easiest route: Mattabesett Trail

Higby Mountain or Mount Higby 892 feet (272 m), is a traprock mountain ridge located 3.75 miles (6.04 km) east of Meriden, Connecticut. It is part of the narrow, linear Metacomet Ridge that extends from Long Island Sound near New Haven, Connecticut, north through the Connecticut River Valley of Massachusetts to the Vermont border. Higby Mountain is known for its high cliff faces, unique microclimate ecosystems, and rare plant communities. It rises steeply 600 feet (180 m) above the Quinnipiac River valley and the city of Meriden to the west as a continuous 2-mile (3 km) long ledge. The mountain is traversed by the 50-mile (80 km) Mattabesett Trail.

== Geography ==
Located within the towns of Middletown, Meriden, and Middlefield, Higby Mountain is 3 miles (4.8 km) long by 1.2 miles (1.9 km) wide at its widest point, although rugged topography makes its total surface area much larger. Higby Mountain is an important aquifer; two reservoirs and one pond lie at its base: Higby Mountain Reservoir at its east foot; Adder Reservoir, on the upper eastern slope; and Black Pond between Besek Mountain and Higby Mountain. The mountain forms a conspicuous, sharp 2-mile (3 km) long cliffline visible throughout the upper Quinnipiac River Valley and metropolitan Meriden. Camel's Hump, est. 750 feet (230 m), also called The Pinnacle is a prominent southern high point on the ridge just above a shallow gap called Preston Notch. (The Pinnacle should not be confused with a similarly named peak on Talcott Mountain, or with Pinnacle Rock of Farmington, Connecticut, both part of the Metacomet Ridge to the north of Higby Mountain). Interstate 91 cuts through the gap between Higby Mountain and Chauncey Peak to the north.

The Metacomet Ridge continues northwest from Higby Mountain as Chauncey Peak and south as Besek Mountain. A line of smaller hills extends from the Higby Mountain ridgeline north into Middletown; most notable of these is Fall Hill from which tumbles the 50 feet (15 m) high Westfield Falls, visible from Interstate 91 just north of Higby Mountain. The north and east sides of Higby Mountain drain into Fall Brook, then Sawmill Brook, then the Mattabesett River, thence to the Connecticut River and Long Island Sound. The west and south side drain into Harbor Brook thence into the Quinnipiac River and Long Island Sound.

== Geology and ecology ==
Higby Mountain, like much of the Metacomet Ridge, is composed of basalt, also called traprock, a volcanic rock. The mountain formed near the end of the Triassic Period with the rifting apart of the North American continent from Africa and Eurasia. Lava welled up from the rift and solidified into sheets of strata hundreds of feet thick. Subsequent faulting and earthquake activity tilted the strata, creating the cliffs and ridgeline of Higby Mountain. Hot, dry upper slopes, cool, moist ravines, and mineral-rich ledges of basalt talus produce a combination of microclimate ecosystems on the mountain that support plant and animal species uncommon in greater Connecticut. Higby Mountain is also an important raptor migration path. (See Metacomet Ridge for more information on the geology and ecosystem of Higby Mountain).

== Recreation and conservation ==
Activities enjoyed on the mountain include hiking, snowshoeing, bird watching picnicking, and other passive pursuits. Swimming, boating, and fishing are prohibited in the reservoirs but fishing and boating are allowed on Black Pond. The Mattabesett Trail (maintained by the Connecticut Forest and Park Association), which stretches from the northern end of Lamentation Mountain, south to Totoket Mountain and north again to the Connecticut River, traverses the ridgeline of Higby Mountain. Higby Mountain has two trailheads. There is a roadside parking area at the south end of the mountain on the westbound side of Connecticut Route 66, 1.5 miles (2.4 km) east of Connecticut Route 15 in Meriden. The second trailhead is located at the north end of the mountain at the junction of Miner Street and Interstate 91, exit 20 in Middletown; parking is permitted along the road. Black Pond can be accessed via a small parking lot off East Main Street in Meriden, 1.2 miles (1.9 km) east of Connecticut Route 15.

The Nature Conservancy maintains a 158 acres (64 ha) reservation on the south ridgeline of Higby Mountain. The town of Middletown owns part of the mountain, both as open space and as watershed. Black Pond, undeveloped and scenic, is part of the Black Pond Wildlife Management Area.

Threats to the ecosystem and ridgeline of Higby Mountain include development and quarrying. In 2000, Higby Mountain was included in a study by the National Park Service for the designation of a new National Scenic Trail now tentatively called the New England National Scenic Trail, which would include the Metacomet-Monadnock Trail in Massachusetts and the Mattabesett Trail and Metacomet Trail trails in Connecticut.

The Meriden Land Trust and the Middlesex Land Trust have been active in conserving the viewshed of Higby Mountain.

== See also ==
- Metacomet Ridge
- Adjacent summits:

↓ South

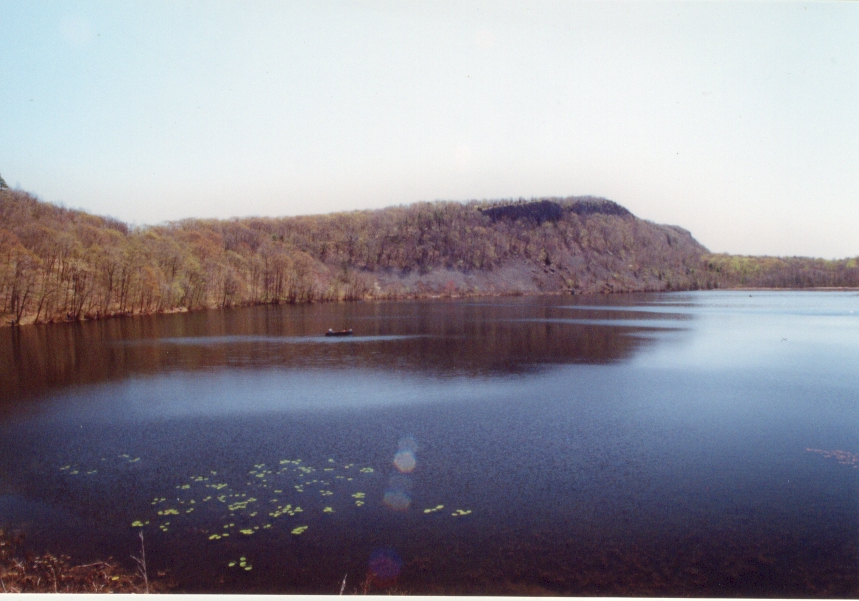
Besek Mountain

North ↑

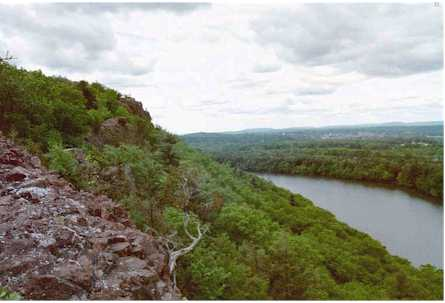
Chauncey Peak
