= Fowler Mountain =

Mountain in the American state of Connecticut

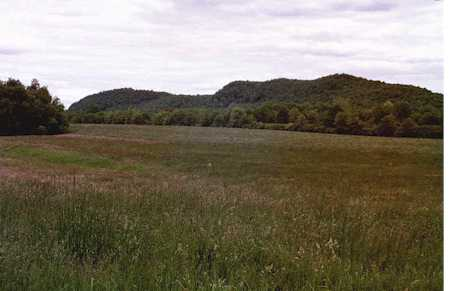
- Fowler Mountain ridgeline from below

Highest point
- Elevation: c. 750 ft (230 m)
- Parent peak: 41° 26' 39"N, 72° 44' 25"W
- Coordinates: 41°26′39″N 72°44′25″W

Geography
- Location within Connecticut
- Location: Durham and Wallingford, Connecticut
- Parent range: Metacomet Ridge

Geology
- Rock age: 200 Ma
- Mountain type(s): Fault-block; igneous

Climbing
- Easiest route: Mattabesett Trail

Fowler Mountain, est. 750 feet (230 m), is a traprock mountain located 7 miles (11 km) southeast of the center of Meriden, Connecticut. It is part of the narrow, linear Metacomet Ridge that extends from Long Island Sound near New Haven, Connecticut, north through the Connecticut River Valley of Massachusetts to the Vermont border. Fowler Mountain is known for its rugged topography, unique microclimate ecosystems, and rare plant communities. It rises steeply 300 feet (91 m) above the Ulbrich Reservoir and the Quinnipiac River valley to the west. The mountain is traversed by the 50-mile (80 km) Mattabesett Trail.

== Geography ==
Located within the towns of Durham and Wallingford, Connecticut, Fowler Mountain is 1.2 miles (1.9 km) long by 0.5 miles (0.80 km) wide, although rugged topography makes the actual square mileage much larger. Fowler Mountain is an important aquifer; two reservoirs lie at the base of it: Ulbrich Reservoir to the west, in the town of Wallingford and Pistapaug Pond to the south, between Fowler Mountain and Pistapaug Mountain. The mountain is largely wooded with a few lookouts from rugged ledges over the reservoirs below.

The Metacomet Ridge continues north from Fowler Mountain as Trimountain and south as Pistapaug Mountain. The western half of Fowler Mountain drains into Muddy River, then into the Quinnipiac River, thence to Long Island Sound; the east side drains into the Coginchaug River, thence into the Connecticut River and Long Island Sound.

== Geology and ecology ==
Fowler Mountain, like much of the Metacomet Ridge, is composed of basalt, also called traprock, a volcanic rock. The mountain formed near the end of the Triassic Period with the rifting apart of the North American continent from Africa and Eurasia. Lava welled up from the rift and solidified into sheets of strata hundreds of feet thick. Subsequent faulting and earthquake activity tilted the strata, creating the cliffs and ridgeline of Fowler Mountain. Hot, dry upper slopes, cool, moist ravines, and mineral-rich ledges of basalt talus produce a combination of microclimate ecosystems on the mountain that support plant and animal species uncommon in greater Connecticut. Fowler Mountain is also an important raptor migration path. (See Metacomet Ridge for more information on the geology and ecosystem of Fowler Mountain).

== Recreation and conservation ==
Much of the summit and the west side of Fowler Mountain has been conserved as part of the undeveloped Trimountain State Park and as municipal watershed land. Suburban housing occupies the lower slopes of the east side of the mountain. Activities enjoyed on the mountain include hiking, snowshoeing, picnicking, and other passive pursuits. Swimming, boating, and fishing are prohibited in the reservoirs. The Mattabesett Trail (maintained by the Connecticut Forest and Park Association), which stretches from the northern end of Lamentation Mountain, south to Totoket Mountain and north again to the Connecticut River, traverses the ridgeline of Fowler Mountain. A trailhead can be found on the south side of Fowler Mountain where the blue blazed Mattabesett trail crosses Howd Road after descending from Pistapaug Mountain. After traversing Fowler Mountain the trail continues directly to Trimountain; a trailhead can be found on route 68 after this traversal.

Threats to the ecosystem of Fowler Mountain include development and quarrying. In 2000, Fowler Mountain was included in a study by the National Park Service for the designation of a new National Scenic Trail now tentatively called the New England National Scenic Trail, which would include the Metacomet-Monadnock Trail in Massachusetts and the Mattabesett Trail and Metacomet Trail trails in Connecticut.

The Wallingford Land Trust and the Middlesex Land Trust have been active in conserving the viewshed of Fowler Mountain.

== See also ==
- Metacomet Ridge
- Adjacent summits:

↓ South
North ↑

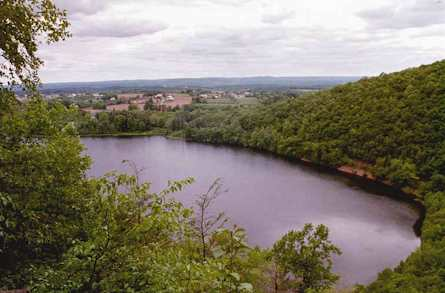
Pistapaug Mountain

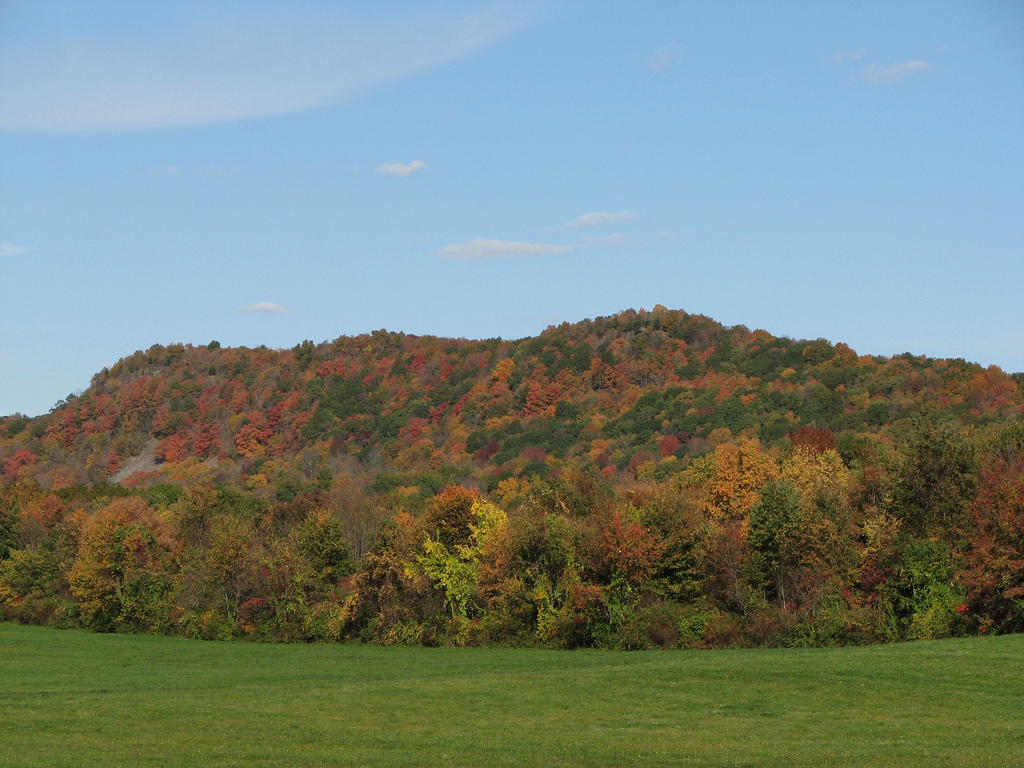
Trimountain
