= Menunkatuck Trail =

Hiking trail in Connecticut, United States

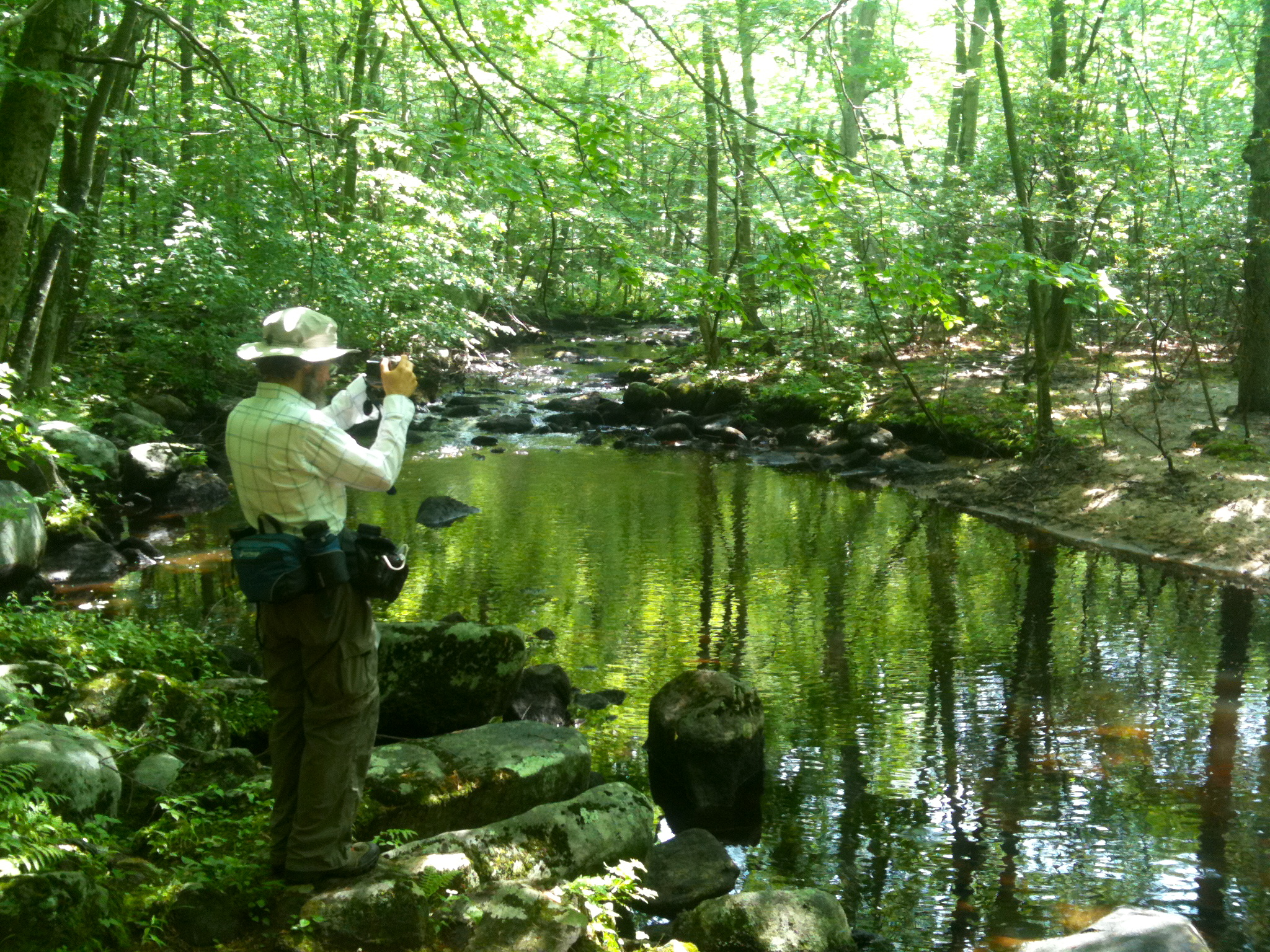
- Vernal pond along the Menunkatuck Trail near the Iron Stream in the Timberlands town forest. Guilford, Connecticut.
- Length: 11.0 miles (17.7 km)
- Location: Connecticut
- Designation: CFPA Blue-Blazed Trail
- Use: hiking, cross-country skiing, snowshoeing, fishing, mountain biking (parts of the trail), other
- Hazards: hunters, deer ticks, poison ivy

The Menunkatuck Trail is an 11.0-mile (17.7 km) Blue-Blazed hiking trail in Guilford, Connecticut and, currently, is almost entirely on protected land owned by the Town of Guilford, the Guilford Conservation Land Trust, the Regional Water Authority (RWA) and on Cockaponset State Forest land.

The mainline (official "Blue" "non-dot") trail is primarily a north / south linear trail with a northern trail head which terminates at the Mattabesett Trail near its southernmost point (approximately 1.3-mile (2.1 km) east of the Mattabesett Trail's intersection with (and "Bluff Head" parking lot on) Connecticut Route 77.

The current southern trail head terminates at a parking lot just outside the Town of Guilford's bulky waste site (and "Stump Dump" on Sullivan Drive just off Goose Lane (41.3125°N 72.6745°W) although the official Menunkatuck Trail blue-blazes end just after the Menunkatuck Trail splits southward from the "White Trail" in the Nut Plains Woods (Guilford Land Conservation Trust). South of Nut Plains Road the trail to the Guilford dump is marked with red-orange plastic ribbons tied to trees. Eventually the plan is for the Menunkatuck Trail to be extended to Long Island Sound (possibly via some road walks) but the trail currently is approximately 3.0-mile (4.8 km) directly due north of Guilford Harbor (and approximately 2.0-mile (3.2 km) due north of US I-95.).

The trail walk can be extended southward from just outside the waste site on Sullivan Drive by following a red-orange plastic ribbon marked trail through the Guilford town-owned East River Preserve to a trailhead on Clapboard Hill Road north of the intersection with Meadowlands. By walking from the East River Preserve trail head on Clapboard Hill Road and then down Meadowlands a ways the trail head to a nature trail on Audubon Society property (the Guilford Salt Meadows Sanctuary) can be found and can extend the walk a bit farther.

== Trail description ==
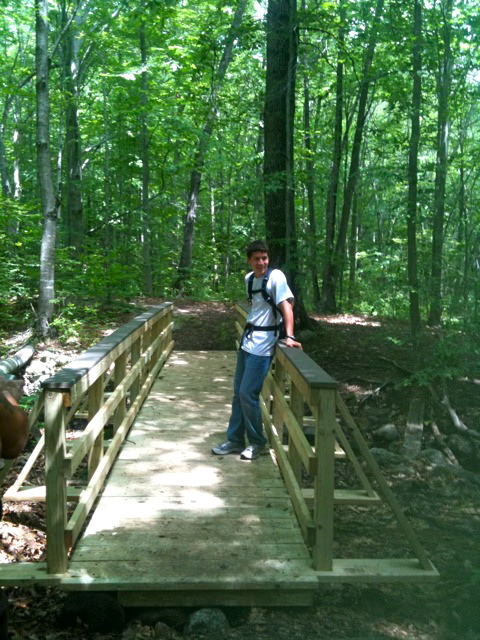
This bridge over a stream in the Guilford section of the Cockaponset State Forest is this young man's Eagle Scout project.

The Blue-Blazed Menunkatuck Trail was created by the Connecticut Forest and Park Association (CFPA). It is a vital segment of the expansive New England National Scenic Trail (NET), establishing a connection between the terminus of the Mattabesett Trail in northern Guilford, Connecticut, and the shores of Long Island Sound. The Menunkatuck Trail is primarily used for hiking, backpacking, picnicking, and in the winter, snowshoeing. Portions of the trail are suitable for, and are used for, cross-country skiing and geocaching. Site-specific activities enjoyed along the route include bird watching, hunting (very limited), fishing, horseback riding, bouldering and rock climbing (limited).

The Menunkatuck Trail's mainline primarily traverses a forested, elevated ridge system in the Guilford area. This terrain features significant variation, generally ranging from near sea level at the southern end to heights of over 400 feet (122 meters), with high points in the broader region often exceeding 600 feet (183 meters).

== History and trail development ==
The CFPA (Connecticut Forest and Park Association), Connecticut’s first private, non-profit conservation organization founded in 1895, launched the Blue-Blazed Hiking Trail System in 1929. The establishment of the Menunkatuck Trail is a relatively recent addition to this system, necessitated by the 2009 designation of the larger New England National Scenic Trail (NET). This federal designation, which combined the historic Metacomet, Monadnock, and Mattabesett (MMM) trails, required a southern connector to reach the Long Island Sound as specified in the legislation.

Development of the Menunkatuck Trail connector primarily occurred around 2010 to fulfill this federal requirement. The trail travels through a mosaic of protected lands and easements, showcasing the dedication of multiple partners to secure the continuous footpath from inland forests to the coast. The route eventually reaches the Long Island Sound at Chittenden Park, which serves as the official Southern Gateway for the New England Trail.

== Hiking the trail ==
The mainline trail is blazed with blue rectangles. Trail descriptions are available from a number of commercial and non-commercial sources, and a complete guidebook is published by the Connecticut Forest and Park Association

Weather along the route is typical of Connecticut. Conditions on exposed ridge tops and summits may be harsher during cold or stormy weather. Lightning is a hazard on exposed summits and ledges during thunderstorms. Snow is common in the winter and may necessitate the use of snowshoes. Ice can form on exposed ledges and summits, making hiking dangerous without special equipment.

Biting insects can be bothersome during warm weather. Parasitic deer ticks (which are known to carry Lyme disease) are a potential hazard. Wearing bright orange clothing during the hunting season (Fall through December) is recommended.

== Conservation and maintenance of the trail corridor ==
A large portion of the Menunkatuck Trail passes through or near protected wetlands: bogs, swamps, vernal ponds and marsh lands. Wooden walkways are planned to allow easy passage over some of these which flood or become muddy often.

There are sections of the trail which are narrow forested easements between streets of substantial houses. These protected green spaces are often 'set asides' created during residential housing development.

Much of the trail is protected, owned and managed by either the Town of Guilford (often by the Conservation Committee), the Guilford Conservation Land Trust or the state (as a part of the Cockaponset State Forest).

Land owned by the Regional Water Authority and private owners is not necessarily nor specifically protected but temporary easements have been negotiated to allow the trail to pass through these properties.
