= Tri-Mountain State Park =

State park in Middlesex County, Connecticut

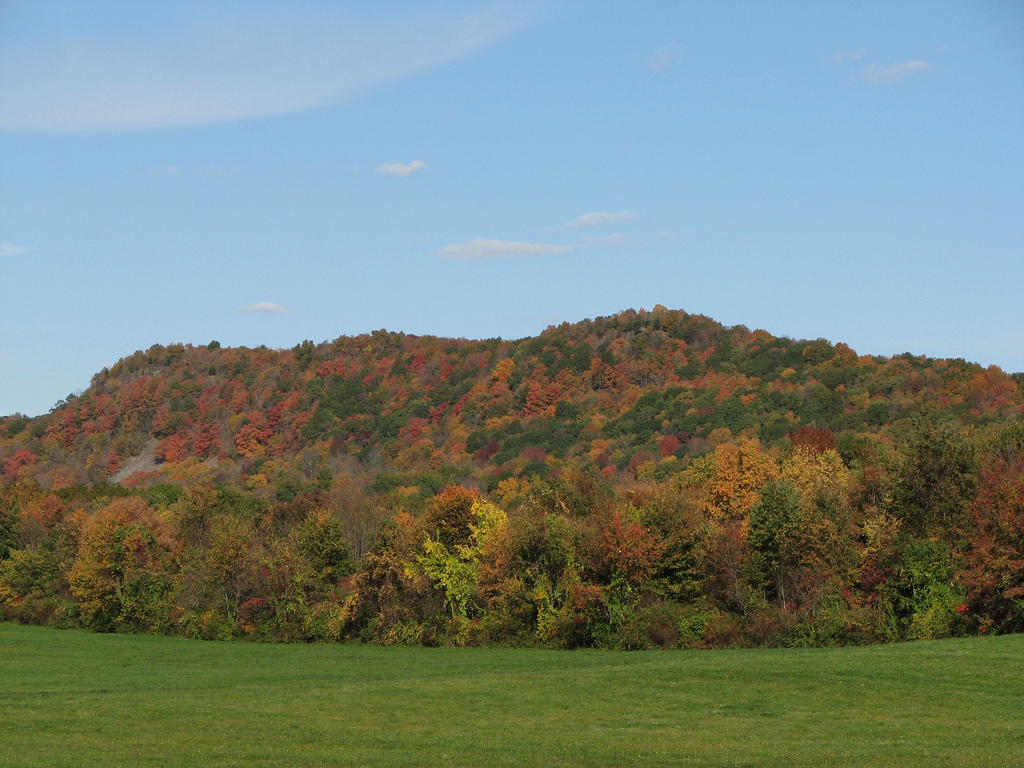
- Tri-Mountain

- Location within Connecticut Location within the United States
- Location: Wallingford & Durham, Connecticut, United States
- Coordinates: 41°26′33″N 72°44′27″W
- Area: 157 acres (64 ha)
- Elevation: 748 ft (228 m)
- Established: 1925
- Administrator: Connecticut Department of Energy and Environmental Protection
- Designation: Connecticut state park
- Website: Official website

Tri-Mountain State Park is an isolated public recreation area located in the towns of Wallingford and Durham, Connecticut. The state park encompasses portions of Fowler Mountain and Trimountain. With no road access, the park can only be reached via the Mattabesett Trail. The park originated in 1925 after Wallingford resident John B. Kendrick donated a six-acre parcel on the summit of Trimountain's southern peak that he had purchased for protective purposes in 1906.
