= Pistapaug Mountain =

Mountain in the American state of Connecticut

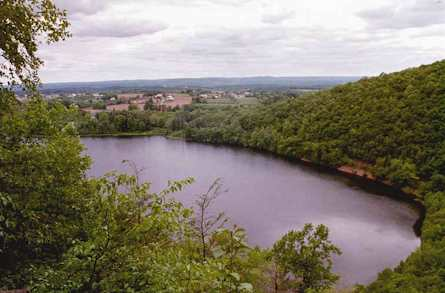
- Pistapaug Pond from Pistapaug Mountain

Highest point
- Elevation: est. 700 ft (210 m)
- Parent peak: 41° 26' 00"N, 72° 44' 13"W
- Coordinates: 41°26′00″N 72°44′13″W

Geography
- Location: Durham and Wallingford, Connecticut
- Parent range: Metacomet Ridge

Geology
- Rock age: 200 Ma
- Mountain type(s): Fault-block; igneous

Climbing
- Easiest route: Mattabesett Trail

Pistapaug Mountain, also known as Paug Mountain, est. 700 feet (210 m), is a traprock mountain located 11 miles (18 km) northeast of New Haven, Connecticut. It is part of the narrow, linear Metacomet Ridge that extends from Long Island Sound near New Haven, Connecticut, north through the Connecticut River Valley of Massachusetts to the Vermont border. Pistapaug Mountain is known for its rugged topography and bluff overlooks, unique microclimate ecosystems, and rare plant communities. It rises steeply 300 feet (91 m) above the Pistapaug Pond and the Quinnipiac River valley to the west. The mountain is traversed by the 50-mile (80 km) Mattabesett Trail.

== Geography ==
Located within the town of Durham, Pistapaug Mountain is 2 miles (3.2 km) long by 0.5 miles (0.8 km) wide, although rugged topography makes the actual square mileage much larger. The Metacomet Ridge continues north from Pistapaug Mountain as Fowler Mountain and south as Totoket Mountain. Pistapaug Mountain is an important aquifer; Pistapaug Pond, located at the foot of the mountain to the east, is a drinking water supply. The mountain is largely wooded but offers a few clifftop overlooks to the west over Pistapaug Pond and the Quinnipiac River Valley.

The western half of Pistapaug Mountain drains into the Farm River, thence to the East Haven River and Long Island Sound; the east side drains into Parmalee Brook, then into the Coginchaug River, thence into the Connecticut River and Long Island Sound.

== Geology and ecology ==
Pistapaug Mountain, like much of the Metacomet Ridge, is composed of basalt, also called traprock, a volcanic rock. The mountain formed near the end of the Triassic Period with the rifting apart of the North American continent from Africa and Eurasia. Lava welled up from the rift and solidified into sheets of strata hundreds of feet thick. Subsequent faulting and earthquake activity tilted the strata, creating the cliffs and ridgeline of Pistapaug Mountain. Hot, dry upper slopes, cool, moist ravines, and mineral-rich ledges of basalt talus produce a combination of microclimate ecosystems on the mountain that support plant and animal species uncommon in greater Connecticut. Pistapaug Mountain is also an important raptor migration path. (See Metacomet Ridge for more information on the geology and ecosystem of Pistapaug Mountain).

== Recreation and conservation ==
Much of the east side of the mountain is private property; the west side is municipal watershed land. The Mattabesett Trail (maintained by the Connecticut Forest and Park Association), which stretches from the northern end of Lamentation Mountain, south to Totoket Mountain and north again to the Connecticut River, traverses the ridgeline of Pistapaug Mountain. Activities enjoyed on Mattabesett Trail include hiking, snowshoeing, picnicking, and other passive pursuits. Pistapaug Pond is not open to the public. The trailhead for Pistapaug Mountain and the Mattabesett Trail is located between Totoket Mountain and Pistapaug Mountain on Connecticut Route 17, 4 miles (6.4 km) east of Northford and 3.3 miles (5.3 km) west of the junction of Connecticut Route 77. Parking is available alongside Route 17.

The ecosystems and ridgeline of Pistapaug Mountain are most threatened by development. In 2000, Pistapaug Mountain was included in a study by the National Park Service for the designation of a new National Scenic Trail now tentatively called the New England National Scenic Trail, which would include the Metacomet-Monadnock Trail in Massachusetts and the Mattabesett Trail and Metacomet Trail trails in Connecticut.

The Middlesex Land Trust and the Wallingford Land Trust have been active in conserving the viewshed of Pistapaug Mountain.

== See also ==
- Metacomet Ridge
- Adjacent summits:

↓ South

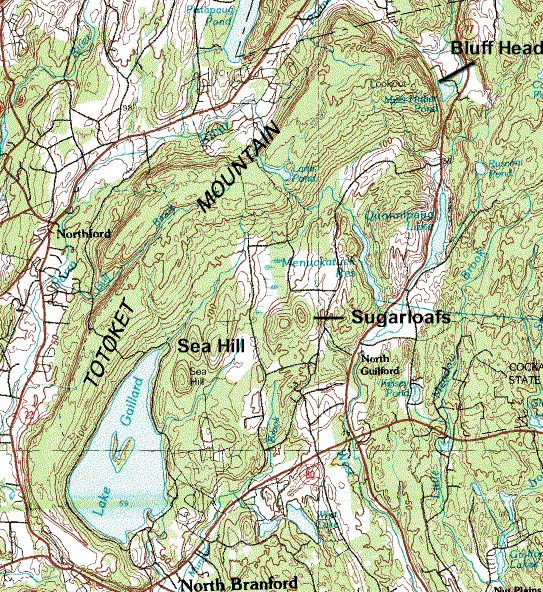
Totoket Mountain

North ↑

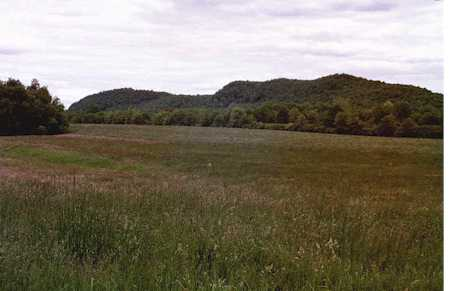
Fowler Mountain
