= Farm River =

Farm River can refer to:

- Farm River (Connecticut), a short river near New Haven, Connecticut
- Farm River (Massachusetts), a short river near Boston, Massachusetts
