= Cathole Mountain =

Mountain peak in Meriden, Connecticut, US

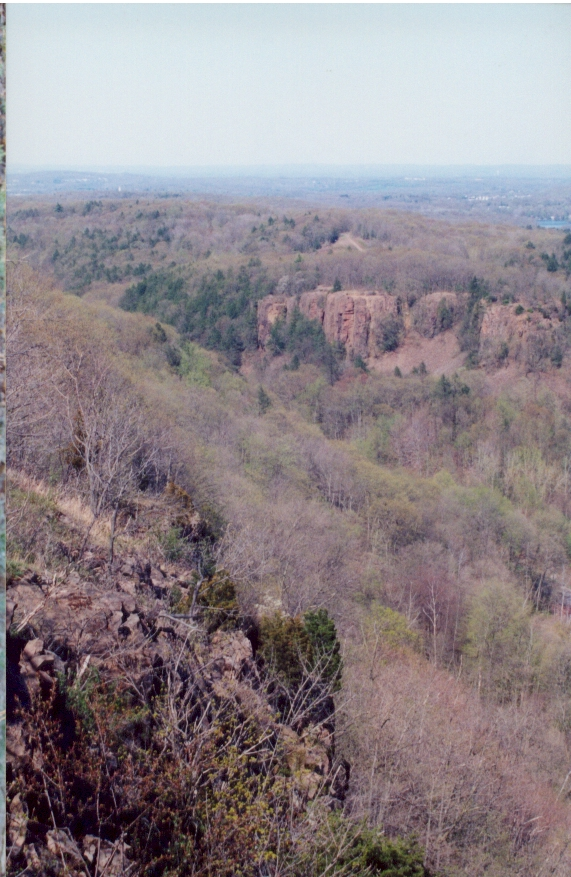
- Cathole Mountain from South Mountain

Highest point
- Elevation: 515 ft (157 m)
- Parent peak: 41° 33' 35"N, 72° 48' 38"W
- Coordinates: 41°34′33″N 72°48′02″W summit; 41°33′35″N 72°48′38″W southern ledge

Geography
- Location within Connecticut
- Location: Meriden, Connecticut
- Parent range: Hanging Hills / Metacomet Ridge

Geology
- Rock age: 200 million yrs.
- Mountain type(s): fault-block; igneous

Climbing
- Easiest route: Metacomet Trail

Cathole Mountain, 515 feet (157 m), is the lowest peak in the trap rock Hanging Hills of Meriden, Connecticut. The rugged southern ledges of the mountain rise steeply 150 feet (46 m) above the city of Meriden. The mountain is separated from South Mountain by the narrow, rocky Cathole Pass through which Connecticut Route 71 ascends.

The mountain consists of two prominences, the southern ledges 341 feet (104 m) and the main peak one mile to the north. The 51 mile Metacomet Trail crosses Cathole Mountain and offers views of Cathole Pass. The cliffs continue south with views over Meriden, but there is no official trail that runs the length of them. Activities enjoyed on the peak include hiking, rock climbing, and in the winter, snowshoeing.

Much of the northern half of the mountain is privately owned.

== Adjacent summits ==
< East

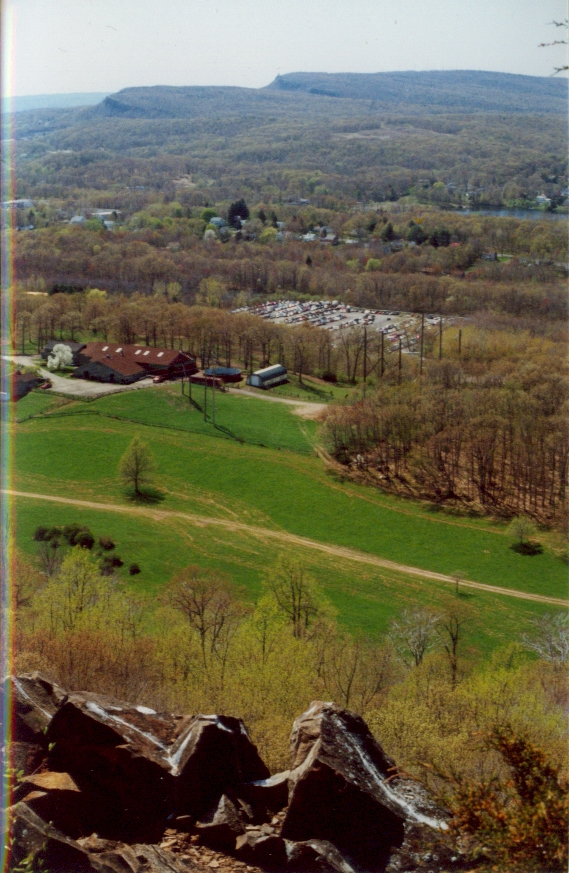
Lamentation Mountain

West >

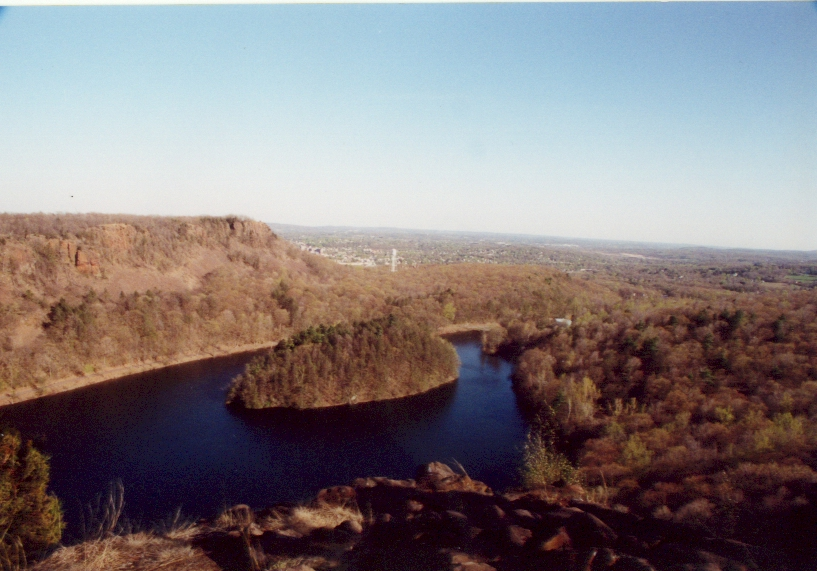
South Mountain

== See also ==
- Metacomet Ridge
- Mattabesett Trail
