= Maltby-Stevens Factory Site =

Archaeological site in Connecticut, United States

- U.S. National Register of Historic Places
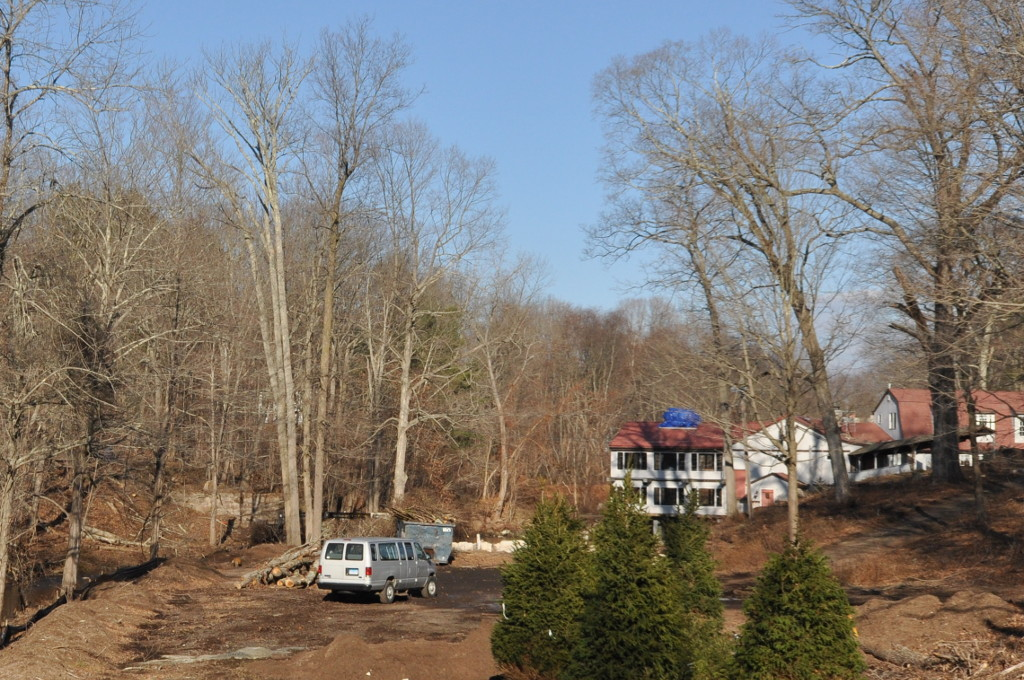
- Dam remnants are visible to the left of the building, which postdates the factory
- Location: Address Restricted, North Branford, Connecticut
- Area: less than one acre
- Built: 1850
- NRHP reference No.: 99001668
- Added to NRHP: January 27, 2000

The Maltby-Stevens Factory Site is a historic archaeological industrial site in North Branford, Connecticut. Located on the banks of the Farm River, the factory was a major local employer in the second half of the 19th century, producing buttons and dried coconut, among a diversity of products. The site, now foundations and water power infrastructure remnants, was listed on the National Register of Historic Places in 2000.

== Description and history ==
The Maltby and Fowler families were prominent families in the 19th century history of the Northford village of North Branford. In 1830, Maltby Fowler, a scion of both families, opened a factory on the Farm River, which was engaged in the manufacture of buttons. In 1850, Fowler and his relatives Samuel and Julius Maltby began manufacturing tools and agricultural implements. E.C. Maltby, Julius' son, took over the business about 1860. He used coconut shells in the manufacture of ladles, and initially discarded the flesh of the nut. Kitchen experimentation produced a method for preserving the flesh by desiccation, with the result that dried shredded coconut also became a product of the factory.

The Maltbys moved their business to Shelton in 1880. The plant was then taken over by David Stevens, who produced a popular series of Christmas cards that inaugurated their manufacture in Northford as one of its major industries. By the early 20th century, the factory was in decline. It was demolished about 1935, and the dam on the Farm River was washed away by flooding in 1971. A tavern was then built on the site.

== See also ==
- National Register of Historic Places listings in New Haven County, Connecticut
