= Lamentation Mountain State Park =

State park in Connecticut, United States

- IUCN category III (natural monument or feature)
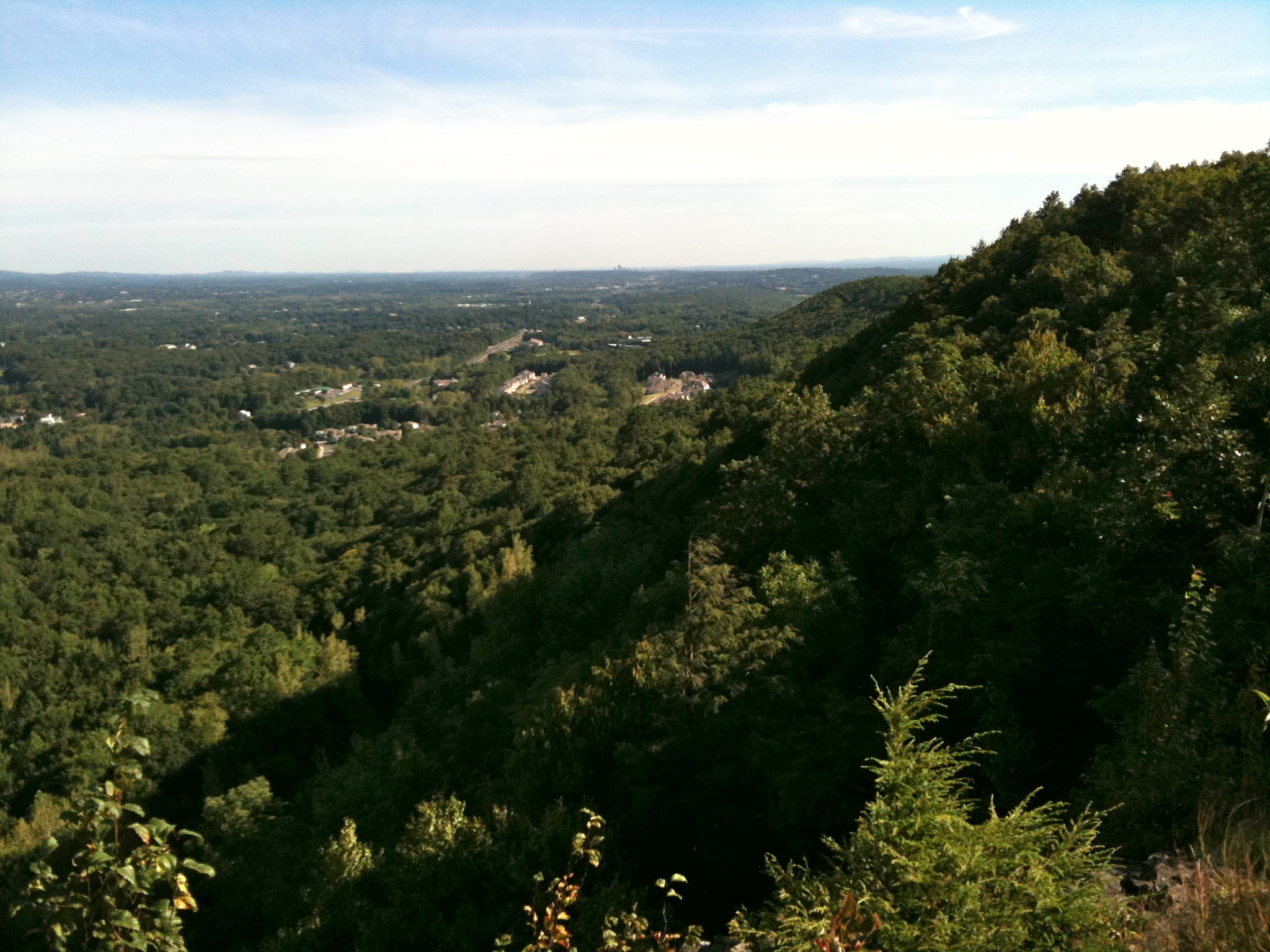
- View from high point on Mattabesett ridgeline in Guiffrida Park looking north at Lamentation Mountain (and State Park).

- Location within Connecticut Location within the United States
- Location: Berlin, Connecticut, United States
- Coordinates: 41°34′44″N 72°45′45″W
- Area: 47 acres (19 ha)
- Elevation: 299 ft (91 m)
- Designation: Connecticut state park
- Established: 1936
- Administrator: Connecticut Department of Energy and Environmental Protection
- Website: Lamentation Mountain State Park

Lamentation Mountain State Park is an undeveloped public recreation area covering 47 acres (19 ha) in the town of Berlin, Connecticut. It entered the roll of state parks in the 1936 edition of the Connecticut Register and Manual. The state park extends for about 0.4 miles (0.64 km) from the Berlin Turnpike up the western flank of Lamentation Mountain to the ridgeline near the Mattabesett Trail. The park offers hiking and scenic vistas.
