= Farm River State Park =

State park in East Haven, United States

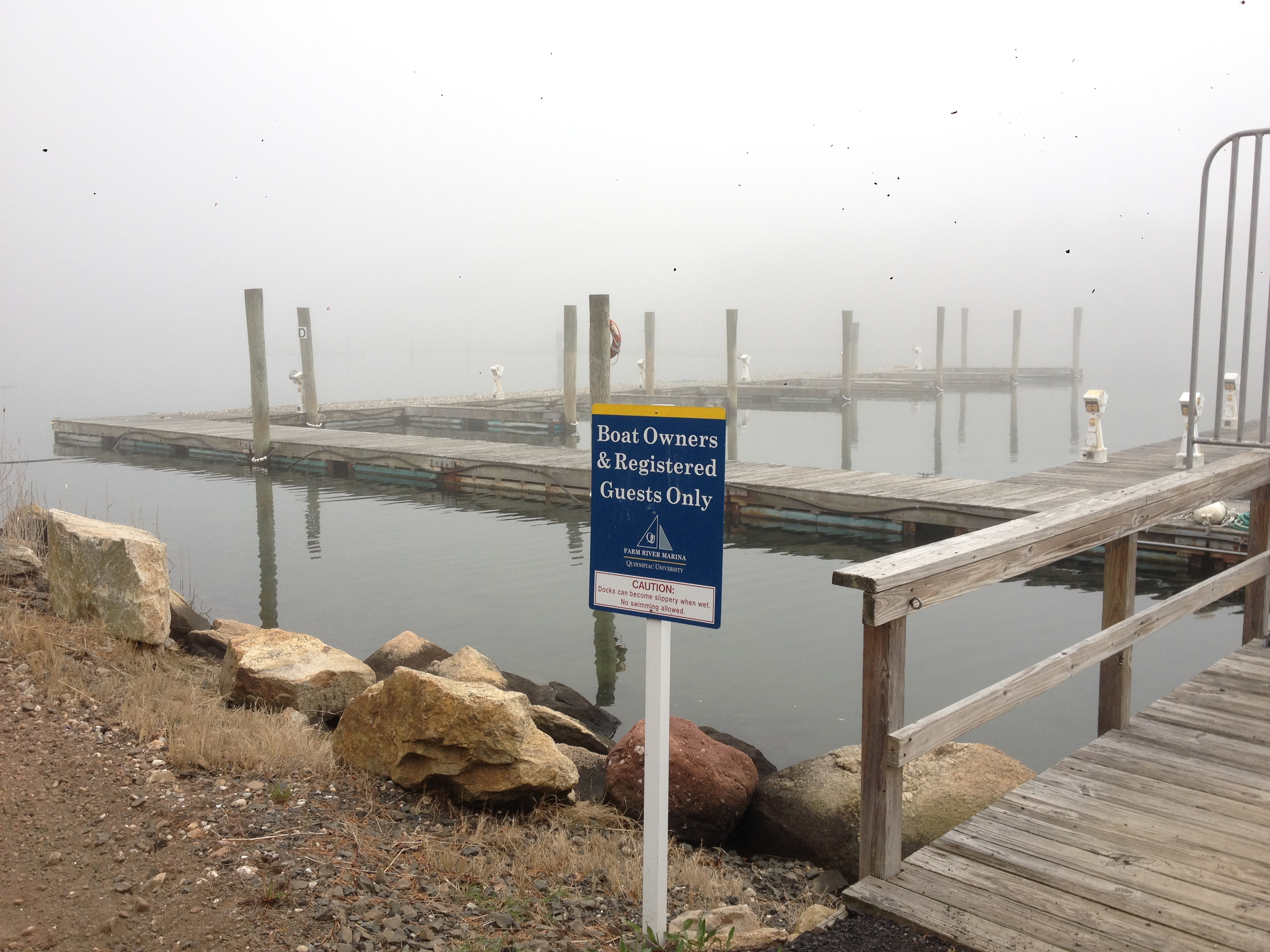

- Location within Connecticut Location within the United States
- Location: East Haven, Connecticut, United States
- Coordinates: 41°15′17″N 72°51′25″W
- Area: 62 acres (25 ha)
- Designation: Connecticut state park
- Established: 1998
- Administrator: Connecticut Department of Energy and Environmental Protection
- Website: Farm River State Park

Farm River State Park is a privately operated, publicly owned recreation area on the western shore of the Farm River estuary in the town of East Haven, Connecticut. Public access to the 62-acre state park is limited and boating is restricted to those with passes obtained from Quinnipiac University, which manages the park for the Connecticut Department of Energy and Environmental Protection. Park activities include nature trail hiking, bird watching, and fishing.

== Ecology ==
The park sits along the estuarine portion of the Farm River, which begins as a freshwater stream 16 miles (26 km) to the north in North Branford. The park contains marshland, tidal wetlands and a rocky shore that hosts bird species including ducks, gulls, snowy egrets, and blue herons. The unique geology of the uplands and bedrock outcrops provide landscape diversity and allow tidal marsh flooding to separate the park into upper and lower portions.

== History ==
To create the park, the State of Connecticut, in conjunction with the U.S. Fish and Wildlife Service and the Trust for Public Lands, purchased a 57-acre parcel and another 15-acre parcel for $1.75 million in 1998. The land was obtained and designated a state park before luxury condominiums were constructed along the river. In 2006, Quinnipiac University installed a wireless network communication system to be used for educational purposes. A trail from the D.C. Moore School through Farm River State Park was cleared by Boy Scout Troop 401 in 2012, as part of the development of the Shoreline Greenway.

== Activities and amenities ==
Park activities include hiking, fishing, bird watching, and car-top boating. The boat launch and docks are managed by a private concessionaire contracted by the state. Trails lead to scenic vistas and a self-guided nature trail. The main access points are off Connecticut Route 142 (Short Beach Road) and via an electrically controlled gate off Mansfield Grove Road. Access to the park is restricted to trailheads with limited parking.
