= Higby =

Higby is a surname. Notable people with the surname include:

- Higby (baseball), American baseball player
- Lawrence Higby, American businessman and political activist
- Lynn Carlton Higby (1938 – 1992), former United States federal judge
- Mary Higby Schweitzer, paleontologist at North Carolina State University
- Wayne Higby (born 1943), American artist working in ceramics
- Wilbur Higby (1867 – 1934), American actor
- William Higby (1813 – 1887), United States Representative from California
- William Eugene Higby, 29th Lieutenant Governor of Colorado

== See also ==
- Higby, Ohio
- Higby, Roane County, West Virginia
- Higbee (disambiguation)
