= Farm River (Connecticut) =

Farm River (Alternately, East Haven River among many other names)
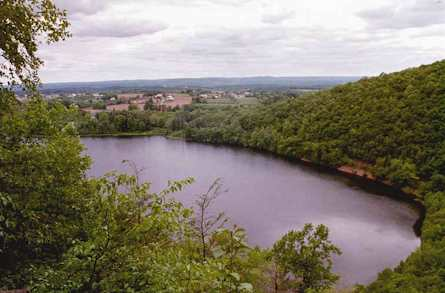
- Pistapaug Pond, one of the sources of the Farm River Beginning and end of Farm River in Connecticut

Location
- Country: United States
- State: Connecticut
- County: New Haven
- Towns: East Haven, Branford, North Branford

Physical characteristics
- Source
  - location: North Branford, Connecticut, United States
  - coordinates: (41°25′23″N 72°44′16″W)
  - elevation: 345 ft (105 m)
- Mouth
  - location: Long Island Sound, New Haven County, Connecticut, United States
  - coordinates: (41°14′51″N 72°51′33″W)
  - elevation: 0 ft (0 m)
- Length: 16.5 mi (26.6 km)

Farm River is a south-flowing river located entirely within the U.S. state of Connecticut. Because it begins as freshwater in its northern reaches and flows into tidal salt water at Long Island Sound, Farm River is by definition an estuary. The river is 16.5 miles (26.6 km) long.

== Sources ==
The USGS identifies the river's headwaters as an area below the southeast flank of Pistapaug Mountain in the town of North Branford. The Friends of the Farm River Estuary name the river's source as Pistapaug Pond, a reservoir straddling the town lines of Wallingford, Durham and North Branford, below the west flank of Pistapaug Mountain.

== Course ==
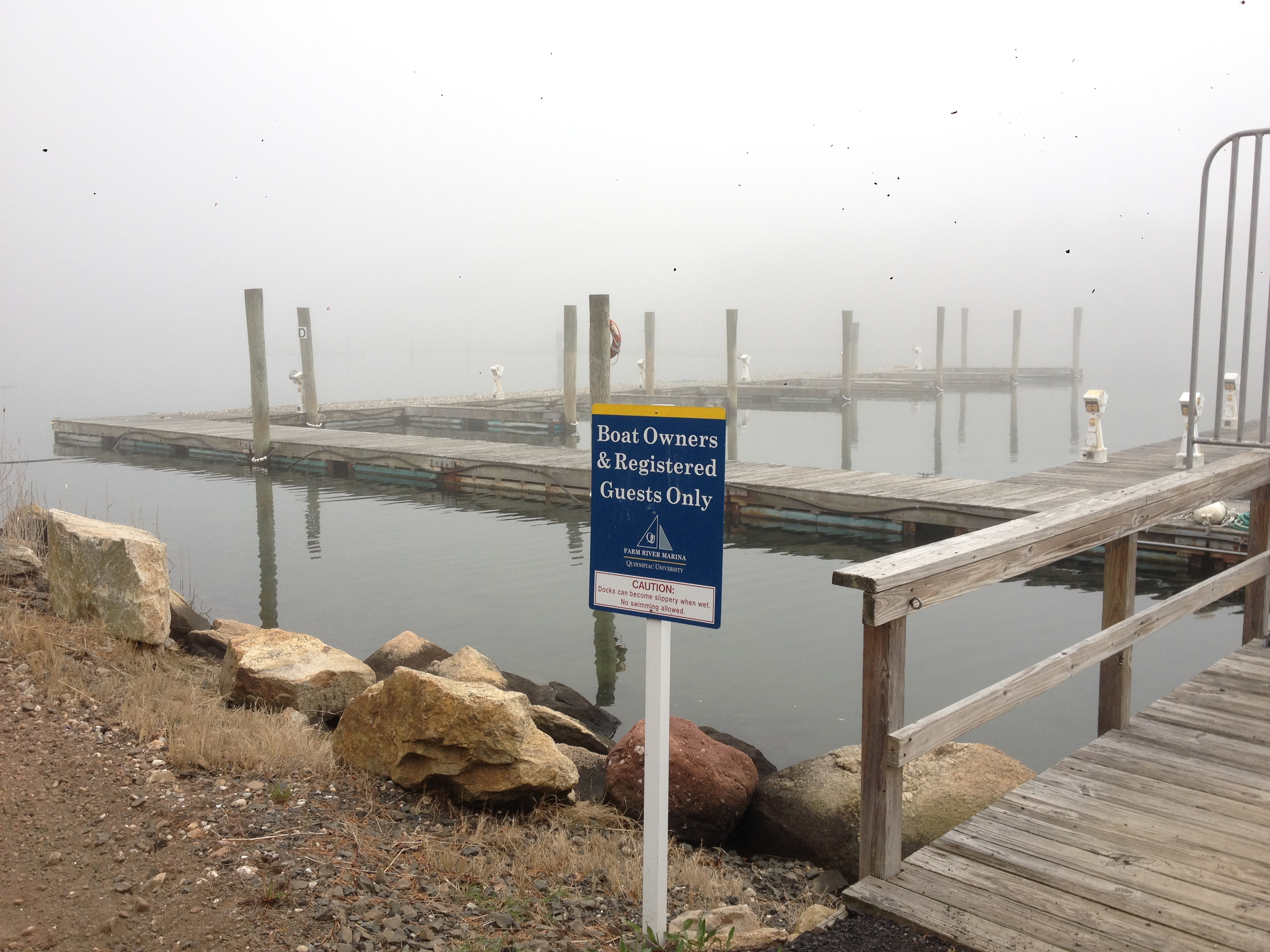
Docks in Farm River State Park

From its northern reaches, the river flows southward into the town of East Haven where it becomes the dividing line between East Haven and Branford. Along its route, the river supplies water via tunnel to Lake Saltonstall, a public water source owned by the South Central Connecticut Regional Water Authority. Near the river's mouth it flows past Farm River State Park.

== Other names ==
The USGS lists among the river's many alternate names Beaver River, Deborah River, Deborah's Stream, East Haven River, Foxon River, Great River, Ironworks River, Mainnuntaquck, Moe River, Muddy River, Scotch Cap River, Stony River, and Tapamshasick. The name Farm River was officially decided upon in 1968.

== See also ==
- List of rivers of Connecticut
