= Higby, West Virginia =

Higby
- Ghost town
- Location within the state of West Virginia
- Coordinates: 38°39′26″N 81°29′26″W
- Country: United States
- State: West Virginia
- County: Roane
- Elevation: 689 ft (210 m)
- Time zone: UTC-5 (Eastern (EST))
  - Summer (DST): UTC-4 (EDT)
- GNIS ID: 1740904

Higby is a ghost town in Roane County, West Virginia.

The town's name is a corruption of nearby Higly Creek.
