= Lamentation Mountain =

Traprock mountain in the American state of Connecticut

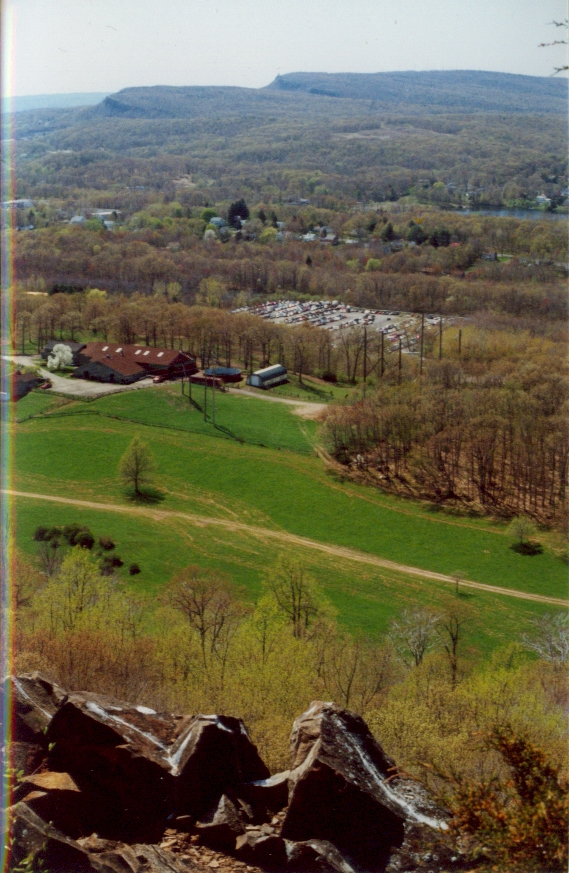
- View of the Hanging Hills from Lamentation Mountain

Highest point
- Elevation: 720 ft (220 m)
- Parent peak: 41° 34' 27"N, 72° 45' 45"W
- Coordinates: 41°34′27″N 72°45′45″W

Geography
- Location: Middletown, Berlin, and Middlefield, Connecticut
- Parent range: Metacomet Ridge

Geology
- Rock age: 200 Ma
- Mountain type(s): Fault-block; igneous

Climbing
- Easiest route: Mattabesett Trail

Lamentation Mountain, or Mount Lamentation, 720 feet (220 m), is a traprock mountain located 2.5 miles (4.0 km) north of Meriden, Connecticut. It is part of the narrow, linear Metacomet Ridge that extends from Long Island Sound near New Haven, Connecticut, north through the Connecticut River Valley of Massachusetts to the Vermont border. Lamentation Mountain is known for its scenic vistas, extensive cliff faces, unique microclimate ecosystems, and rare plant communities. It rises steeply 550 feet (170 m) above the city of Meriden to the south with west-facing cliffs of 200 feet (61 m) or more. The cliff line, described by the Connecticut Forest and Park Association as "perhaps the most scenic traprock ridge walk in the state" is a prominent landscape feature visible for miles. The mountain is traversed by the 50-mile (80 km) Mattabesett Trail.

== Origin of name ==
Lamentation Mountain takes its name from an incident in 1653 when a member of a nearby colony became lost on the mountain for three days before he was found by a search party. Also known from a legend in the 1700s when a Native American girl committed suicide by jumping off the Mountaintop from the loss of her love.

== Geography ==
Roughly 3 miles (5 km) long by 0.75 miles (1.21 km) wide, Lamentation Mountain is located within the towns of Middletown, Berlin, and Meriden, Connecticut.

Crescent Lake, (formerly called Bradley Hubbard Reservoir), lies nestled in the gap between Lamentation Mountain and Chauncey Peak. The lake provides emergency drinking water to the city of Meriden. Silver Lake, visible from the cliffs, is located in the low gap between Lamentation Mountain and Cathole Mountain.

The Metacomet Ridge continues west from Lamentation Mountain to become Cathole Mountain of the Hanging Hills; it continues south as Chauncey Peak. Another, lower extension continues 8 miles (13 km) north culminating in the uplands of Rocky Hill, Connecticut. The southern half of Lamentation Mountain drains into the Quinnipiac River, thence to Long Island Sound; the northern half to the Mattabesett River, then to the Connecticut River, thence to Long Island Sound.

== Geology and ecology ==
Lamentation Mountain, like much of the Metacomet Ridge, is composed of basalt, also called traprock, a volcanic rock. The mountain formed near the end of the Triassic Period with the rifting apart of the North American continent from Africa and Eurasia. Lava welled up from the rift and solidified into sheets of strata hundreds of feet thick. Subsequent faulting and earthquake activity tilted the strata, creating the cliffs and ridgeline of Lamentation Mountain. Hot, dry upper slopes, cool, moist ravines, and mineral-rich ledges of basalt talus produce a combination of microclimate ecosystems on the mountain that support plant and animal species uncommon in greater Connecticut. Lamentation Mountain is also an important raptor migration path. (See Metacomet Ridge for more information on the geology and ecosystem of Lamentation Mountain).

== Recreation and conservation ==
The southern third of Lamentation Mountain lies within Giuffrida Park, managed by the city of Meriden. The park boasts a lake, golf course, woodlands, and the rocky peaks of Lamentation Mountain and Chauncey Peak. Permitted activities within the park include hiking, snowshoeing, cross-country skiing, picnicking, and bicycling. Swimming, boating, and fishing are prohibited on Crescent Lake. Rock climbing is prohibited within the park but is permitted elsewhere on the mountain. The park supports a number of trails, most notably the 50 mile (80k) Mattabesett Trail which stretches from the northern end of Lamentation Mountain, south to Totoket Mountain and north again to the Connecticut River. The 51 mile (80k) Metacomet Trail connects to the Mattabesett Trail at the foot of Lamentation Mountain; the Connecticut Forest and Park Association maintains both trails. Trailhead parking for Lamentation Mountain is located at Giufridda Park on Westfield Road, 1.2 miles (1.9 km) east of its junction with U.S. Route 5 and 1.8 miles (2.9 km) west of Interstate 91, exit 20, via Country Club Road (which becomes Westfield Road) and alongside Spruce Brook Road in Berlin, 0.5 miles (0.80 km) east of its junction with U.S. Route 5 and 1.75 miles (2.82 km) south of Berlin center.

In 2000, Lamentation Mountain was included in a study by the National Park Service for the designation of a new National Scenic Trail now tentatively called the New England National Scenic Trail, which would include the Metacomet-Monadnock Trail in Massachusetts and the Mattabesett Trail and Metacomet Trail trails in Connecticut.

The Berlin Land Trust and the Meriden land Trust are active in the conservation of Lamentation Mountain and its viewshed.

== See also ==
- Lamentation Mountain State Park
- Metacomet Ridge
- Metacomet Trail
- Adjacent summits:

↓ South

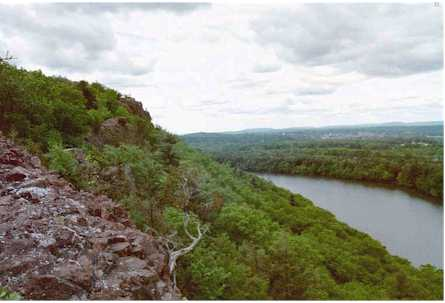
Chauncey Peak

West >

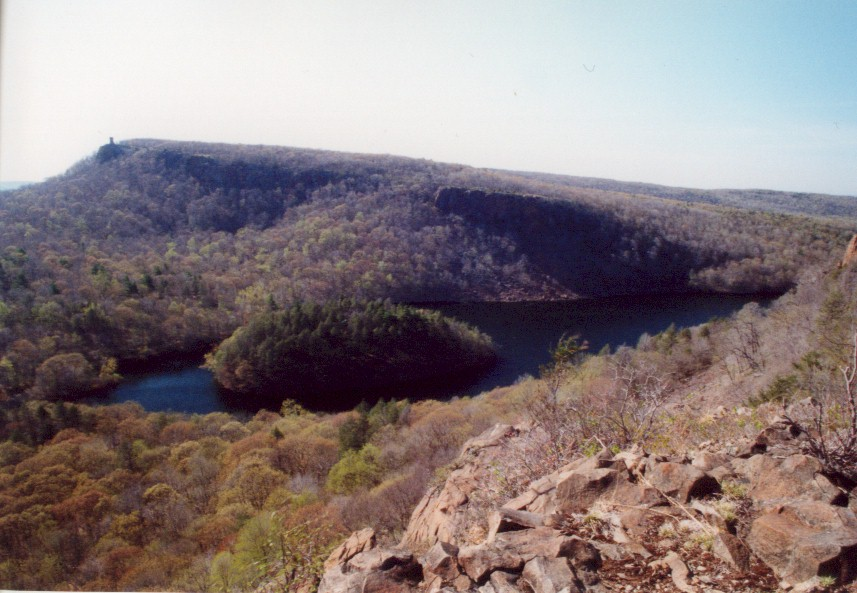
Hanging Hills
