= Totoket Mountain =

Traprock massif near New Haven, Connecticut

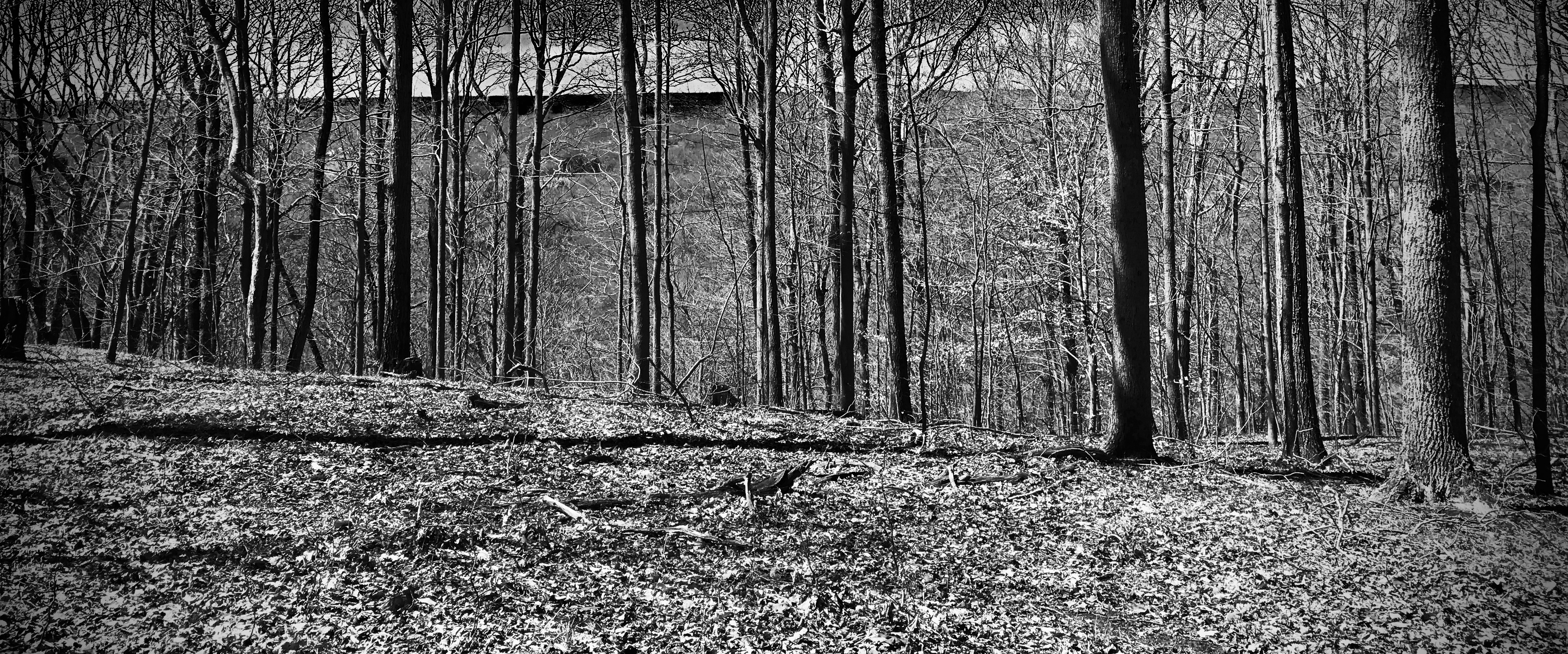
- View from Totoket Mountain facing west towards the Farm River Valley from the Regional Water Authority's Green (Vista) Trail in the Big Gulph Recreation Area.

Highest point
- Elevation: est. 720 ft (220 m) ridge high point
- Coordinates: 41°25′02″N 72°42′07″W Bluff Head (high point)

Geography
- Location: Durham, North Branford, and Guilford, Connecticut
- Parent range: Metacomet Ridge

Geology
- Rock age: 200 million years
- Mountain type(s): Fault-block; igneous

Climbing
- Easiest route: Mattabesett Trail

Totoket Mountain, with a high point of (est.) 720 ft (220 m) above sea level, is a traprock massif with several distinct summits, located 7 mi (11 km) northeast of New Haven, Connecticut. It is part of the Metacomet Ridge that extends from the Long Island Sound near New Haven, north through the Connecticut River Valley of Massachusetts to the Vermont border. Totoket Mountain is known for its 500 ft-high (150 m) scenic cliffs, microclimate ecosystems, rare plant communities, and for Lake Gaillard, a 2.5 mi-wide (4.0 km) public reservoir nearly enclosed by the mountain. The north ridge of Totoket Mountain is traversed by the 50 mi (80 km) Mattabesett Trail and a significant network of shorter trails. The name "Totoket Mountain" applies to both the entire mountain and to a subordinate northwestern peak (577 ft or 176 m).

== Geography ==
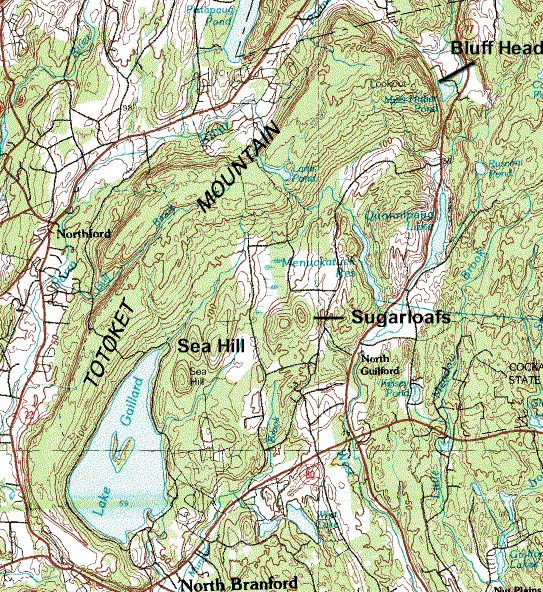
USGS map showing Totoket Mountain

Totoket Mountain rises steeply between 200 ft (61 m) and 650 ft (198 m) above the surrounding landscape, with a high point of (est.) 720 ft (219 m) above sea level. It is roughly 11.5 mi (18.5 km) long by 4.25 mi (10 km) wide at its widest point and lies within the towns of Durham, North Branford, and Guilford, Connecticut. Major peaks on the mountain include Sea Hill 410 ft (120 m); East and West Sugarloaf Hill, 512 and 476 ft (156 and 145 m); Totoket Mountain (a subordinate peak), 577 ft (176 m); and Bluff Head, est. 720 ft (220 m), the high point. The southern half of the mountain splits into two arms which completely encircle the Lake Gaillard Reservoir. Beside Lake Gaillard, the mountain shelters several other small bodies of water, including Menuckatuck Reservoir, West Lake, Clear Lake, Bartlett Pond, Lane Pond, and the scenic Myerhuber Pond (protected as part of the Northwoods conservation area), just below the high cliffs of Bluff Head.

The Metacomet Ridge continues north from Totoket Mountain as Pistapaug Mountain and south as Saltonstall Mountain. An outlying peak, Peter's Rock, lies to the west of Totoket Mountain. The west side of Totoket Mountain drains into the Farm River, thence to the East Haven River and Long Island Sound; the south side into the Branford River and Long Island Sound, the east side into West River and Long Island Sound, and the north side into Parmalee Brook, then to the Coginchaug River, thence to the Connecticut River and Long Island Sound.

== Geology and environment ==
The origin of Totoket Mountain and the Metacomet Ridge dates back 200 million years ago with the rifting apart of North America from Eurasia in the process that would ultimately create the Atlantic Ocean. In the area that is now the Metacomet Ridge and surrounding sedimentary rock basin, massive basalt (traprock) lava flows spread across the prehistoric rift valley, some of them several hundred feet thick, over a period of 20 million years. Sediment accumulated between lava flows and lithified into sedimentary rock. After the rifting processes ceased, layers of strata faulted and tilted upward. Subsequent erosion, glaciation, and uplift exposed the weather resistant edge of the traprock lava sheets, creating the cliffline of the Metacomet Ridge as it is today. The mineral content and the shape of the ridge make possible a variety of microclimate ecosystems. Hot and dry cliff faces support plant and animal species uncommon so far north. Deeply gouged ravines support cooler climate species found in more northerly climes, while gradual backslope environments support species typical of the surrounding latitude. Talus slopes beneath cliffs accumulate minerals that support alkaline-loving plant species uncommon in surrounding acidic southern New England. Extensive cliffs provide ideal habitat and important migration corridors for raptor species.

See Metacomet Ridge for detailed information about the geology and ecosystem of Totoket Mountain.

== Conservation and recreation ==
Recreational activities enjoyed on the mountain include hiking, mountain biking, hunting (in season), picnicking, fishing (certain locations only) and snowshoeing; many high cliffs provide excellent views of the rural countryside. The South Central Connecticut Regional Water Authority (SCCRWA) maintains two networks of trails on Totoket Mountain: Big Gulph on the northwest side of the mountain, and Sugarloaf Hills located in the center of the ridge. An admission permit (fee charged) is required to use these trails. The Northwoods trailhead area is located in the area of Bluff Head, on the northeast side of the mountain; it is maintained by the Guilford Land Trust and is free to the public; 500 ft (152 m) sheer basalt cliffs and a firetower provide sweeping views. The 50 mile (80k) Mattabesett Trail (managed by the Connecticut Forest and Park Association), passes over Bluff Head and through the Northwoods area. A fourth trailhead is located in the gap between Pistapaug Mountain and Totoket Mountain.

Much of the mountain has been protected as public watershed. The balance of the landscape is relatively rural, with farmland and semi-rural home development in the center of the ridge and some conservation land on the northeast bluffs. The SCCRWA restricts public access on portions of its watershed property; boating and fishing on Lake Gaillard are prohibited.

Threats to Totoket Mountain and its unique habitat include suburban sprawl and quarrying. A large quarry operates on the southwest side of the mountain, but expansion is restricted by watershed property to the east and housing to the north. In 2000, the north side of Totoket Mountain was included in a study by the National Park Service for the designation of a new National Scenic Trail now tentatively called the New England National Scenic Trail, which would include the Metacomet-Monadnock Trail in Massachusetts and the Mattabesett Trail and Metacomet Trail trails in Connecticut.

=== Trailheads and parking ===
The Northwoods-Bluff Head parking lot is located on Connecticut Route 77, 3.75 mi (6.04 km) south of Durham center and 9 mi (14 km) north of Guilford center. The Mattabesett Trail is accessible from this lot and via a trailhead located between Totoket Mountain and Pistapaug Mountain on Connecticut Route 17, 4 mi (6 km) east of Northford and 3.3 mi (5.3 km) west of the junction of Route 77; parking is permitted along the road. The Big Gulph trailhead is located behind the Northford Park recreation fields on Connecticut Route 17, 2.2 mi (3.5 km) east of Northford and 5.4 mi (8.7 km) west of the junction of Route 77. Parking is free, but a permit is required to use the trails. The Sugarloaf Hills trailhead and parking lot are located on West Street, 2 mi (3 km) north of its junction with Connecticut Route 80 in North Branford. A permit is required to park and use the trails.

== See also ==
- Metacomet Ridge
- Adjacent summits:

↓ South

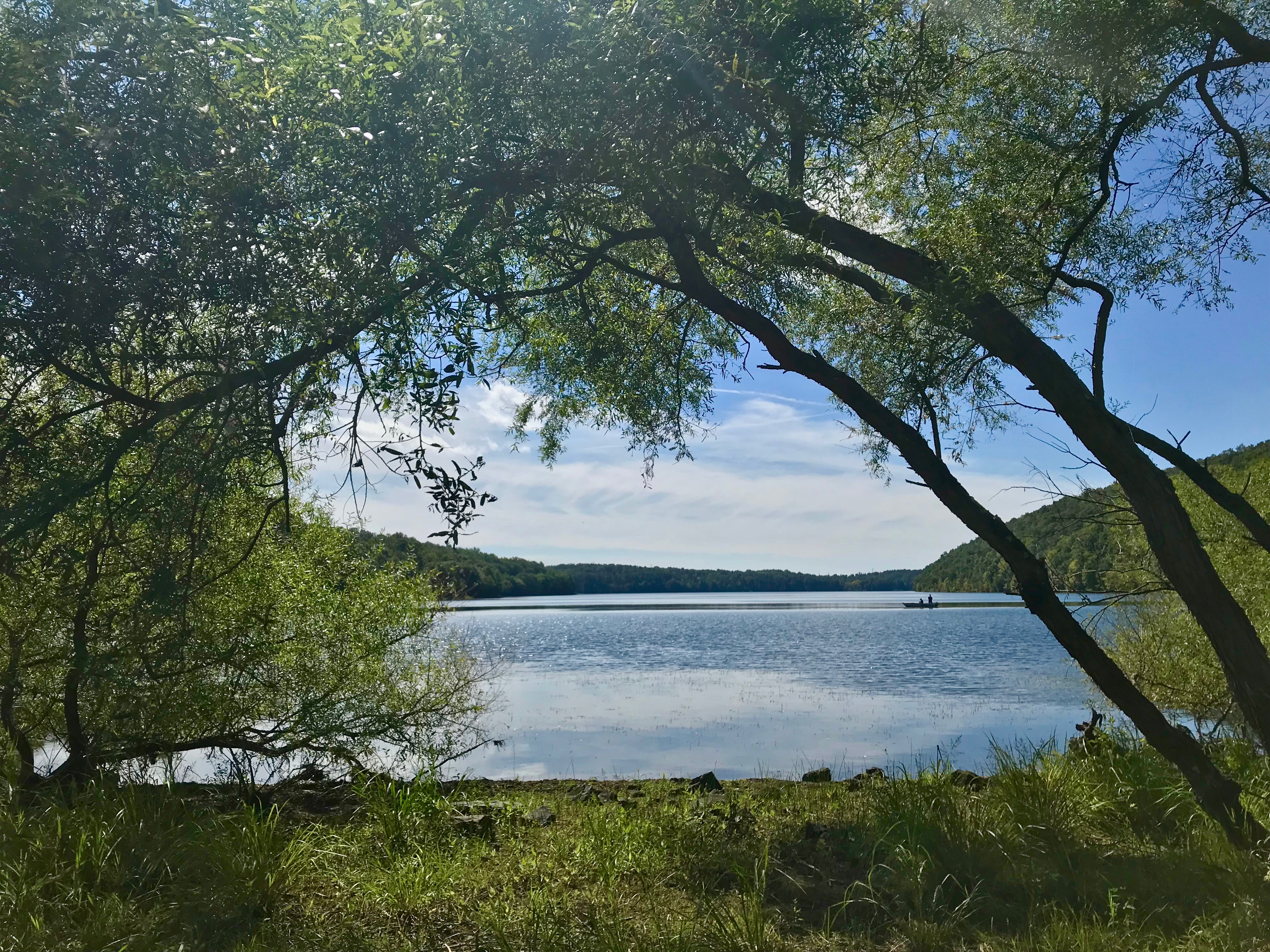
Saltonstall Mountain

North ↑

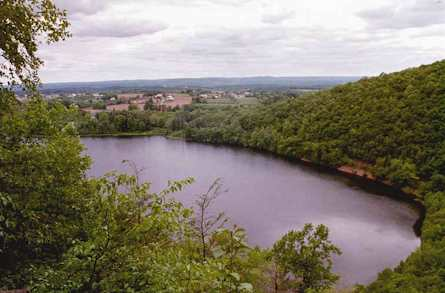
Pistapaug Mountain

< West

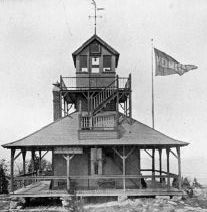
Peter's Rock
