= Mattabesett Trail =

Hiking trail in Connecticut, United States

Coordinates: 41°26′12.33″N 72°40′49.31″W

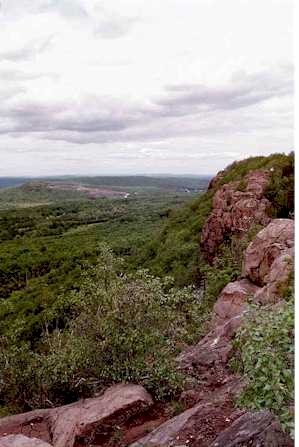
- Higby Mountain along the Mattabesett Trail
- Length: 62.0 miles (99.8 km)
- Location: Connecticut
- Designation: National Scenic Trail, CFPA Blue-Blazed Trail
- Trailheads: Start: River Road in Middletown, opposite power plant on Connecticut River. End: Berlin Turnpike in Berlin.
- Use: hiking, trail running, cross-country skiing, snowshoeing, fishing, geocaching, other
- Highest point: Higby Mountain north summit, 892 ft (272 m)
- Lowest point: Connecticut River, Middletown, 18 ft (5.5 m)
- Difficulty: Easy to difficult with a few dangerous ridge walk sections
- Hazards: deer ticks, poison ivy

The Mattabesett Trail is a 62-mile (100 km) long, hook-shaped blue-blazed hiking trail in central Connecticut and a part of the New England National Scenic Trail. One half of the trail follows the high traprock ridges of the Metacomet Ridge, from Totoket Mountain in Guilford, Connecticut, to Lamentation Mountain in Meriden, Connecticut, from south to north. This ridge is known for its biodiversity, miles of scenic cliffs, and rugged hiking. The second half of the trail extends north from Guilford to Middletown, Connecticut, and ends at the Connecticut River. Here, the trail follows an upland of metamorphic rock with occasional views and dense forests.

Important features along the trail include Lamentation Mountain, Chauncey Peak, Higby Mountain, Besek Mountain, Fowler Mountain, Trimountain, Pistapaug Mountain, Totoket Mountain, the Broomstick Ledges, Seven Falls, and Coginchaug Cave. The Metacomet Trail continues north from Lamentation Mountain where the Mattabesett Trail leaves off.

The geology, ecology, and landscape of the trail are similar to that of the Metacomet-Monadnock Trail to the north in Massachusetts.

In 2000, the United States Congress authorized the National Park Service to research a new National Scenic Trail now called the New England National Scenic Trail in southern New England, which includes the Mattabesett Trail as well as the Metacomet-Monadnock Trail and the Metacomet Trail.

On March 30, 2009 President Barack Obama signed the Omnibus Public Land Management Act of 2009 establishing the New England National Scenic Trail (and two other national scenic trails).

The combination of the Metacomet, Monadnock and Mattabesett trails is also often referred to as the 3-M, MMM or Metacomet-Monadnock-Mattabesett trail. The New England National Scenic Trail will eventually include all or almost all of the MMM trails as well as a proposed extension trail from the southernmost point on the Mattabesett Trail through Guilford, Connecticut to the northern shore of Long Island Sound.

== Trail description ==
The southern-western terminus of the trail is located on the eastern side of the state road known as Connecticut Route 5 and Route 15 across the road from the trailhead for the Metacomet Trail.

The trail is primarily used for trail running, hiking, backpacking, picnicking, and in the winter, snowshoeing. As with all Connecticut Blue Blazed trails, the use of bicycles on the trail is prohibited.

Portions of the trail are suitable for, and are used for, cross-country skiing and geocaching. Site-specific activities enjoyed along the route include bird watching, hunting, fishing, horseback riding, bouldering and rock climbing.

=== Trail route ===
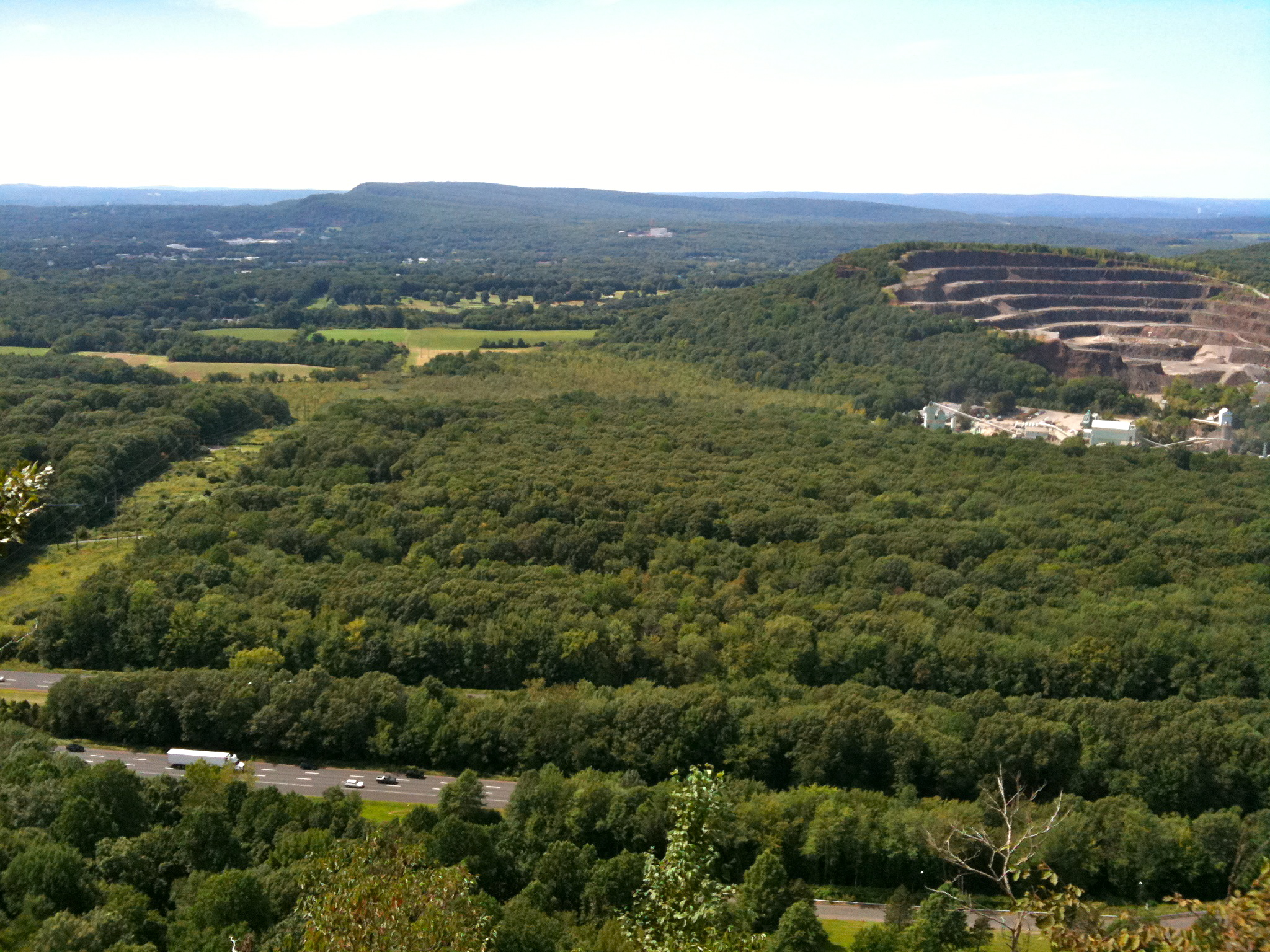
View from Higby Mountain of Interstate 91 and the eastern quarry face of Chauncey Peak. In the far distance is Lamentation Mountain's long ridge.

=== Trail communities ===
The official trail passes through land located within the following Connecticut municipalities, from northwest to south then northeast: Berlin, Middletown, Meriden, Meriden, Middlefield, Wallingford, Durham, Wallingford, Durham, North Branford, Guilford, Madison, Durham, Haddam, Middletown.

== History and folklore ==
The Trail was the third trail created by the Connecticut Forest and Park Association and was completed in 1932. Students from Wesleyan University helped to clear and blaze the trail.

The rough route of the original trail blazed in the 1930s can be seen in the Connecticut Forest and Park Association's 1940 Connecticut Walk Book map of major trails.

=== Origin and name ===
The trail is named for the Mattabesset River (alternate forms Mattabeseck, Mattabesick and Metewemesick—as written by Roger Williams) and the Mattabesset settlement of the Wangunk Native American tribe (also known as "Black-hill Indians" and ) that inhabited the Middletown area.

Mattabesett was also the original name for Middletown at the time European settlers arrived. The derivation Mete-wis translates to "black earth".

=== Historic sites ===
The following historic sites can be found on the Mattabesett Trail route:

- The Powder Ridge Ski area ski lifts and slopes.
- Several colonial area stagecoach roads including Stagecoach Road and Wadsworth Farm Road (which George Washington is alleged to have used in 1775 and 1789).
- Myerhuber Pond—excavated by farmer Conrad Myerhuber using a team of oxen.
- The Selectman's Stones border marker at the corners of Durham, Guilford and Madison.
- The Pest House cellar ruins off of the Mica Ledges in Durham.

== Hiking the trail ==
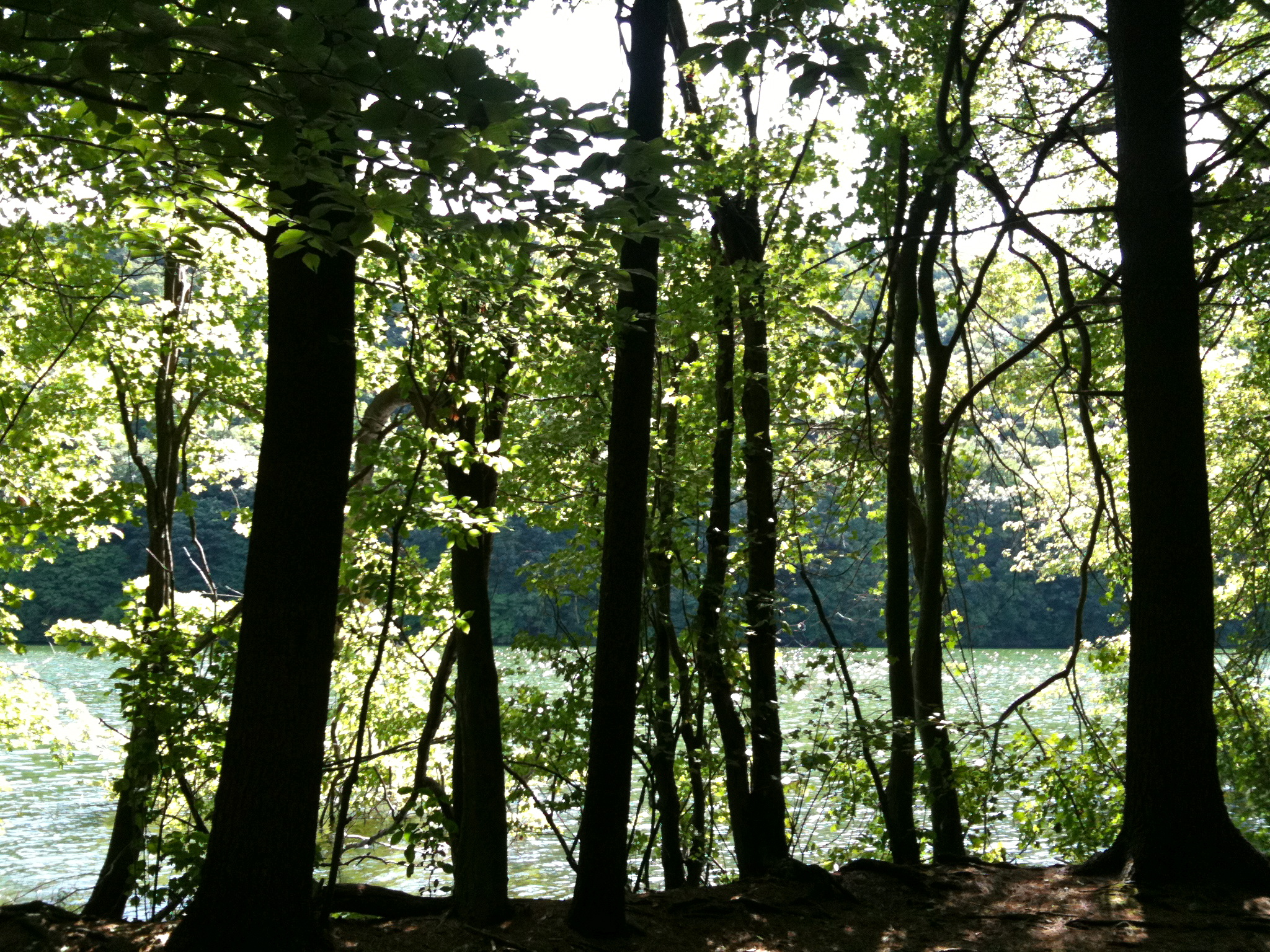
Crescent Lake (Bradley Hubbard Reservoir) in Meriden's Giuffrida Park on the Mattabesett Trail. .

The mainline trail is blazed with blue rectangles. Trail descriptions are available from a number of commercial and non-commercial sources, and a complete guidebook is published by the Connecticut Forest and Park Association

It is regularly maintained, and is considered moderately challenging due to the amount of elevation change with sections of rugged and moderately difficult hiking. As there are dangerous ridge walks children should be supervised in the eastern section's heights.

Much of the trail is close to public roads. There are no camping facilities along the trail and camping is generally prohibited in the areas along the trail.

Weather along the route is typical of Connecticut. Conditions on exposed ridge tops and summits may be harsher during cold or stormy weather. Lightning is a hazard on exposed summits and ledges during thunderstorms. Snow is common in the winter and may necessitate the use of snowshoes. Ice can form on exposed ledges and summits, making hiking dangerous without special equipment.

Extensive flooding in ponds, puddles and streams may occur in the late winter or early spring, overflowing into the trail and causing very muddy conditions. In this case fairly high waterproof boots are recommended. Some southern and eastern parts of the trail follow forest roads which often contain ruts from ATVs and four-wheel drive vehicles.

Biting insects can be bothersome during warm weather. Parasitic deer ticks (which are known to carry Lyme disease) are a potential hazard.

Parts of the trail (particularly the easternmost sections) are adjacent to, or is on lands where hunting and the use of firearms are permitted. Wearing bright orange clothing during the hunting season (Fall through December) is recommended.

Trail runners sometimes run the trail in its entirety, attempting to set a time record for traversing the length of the trail.

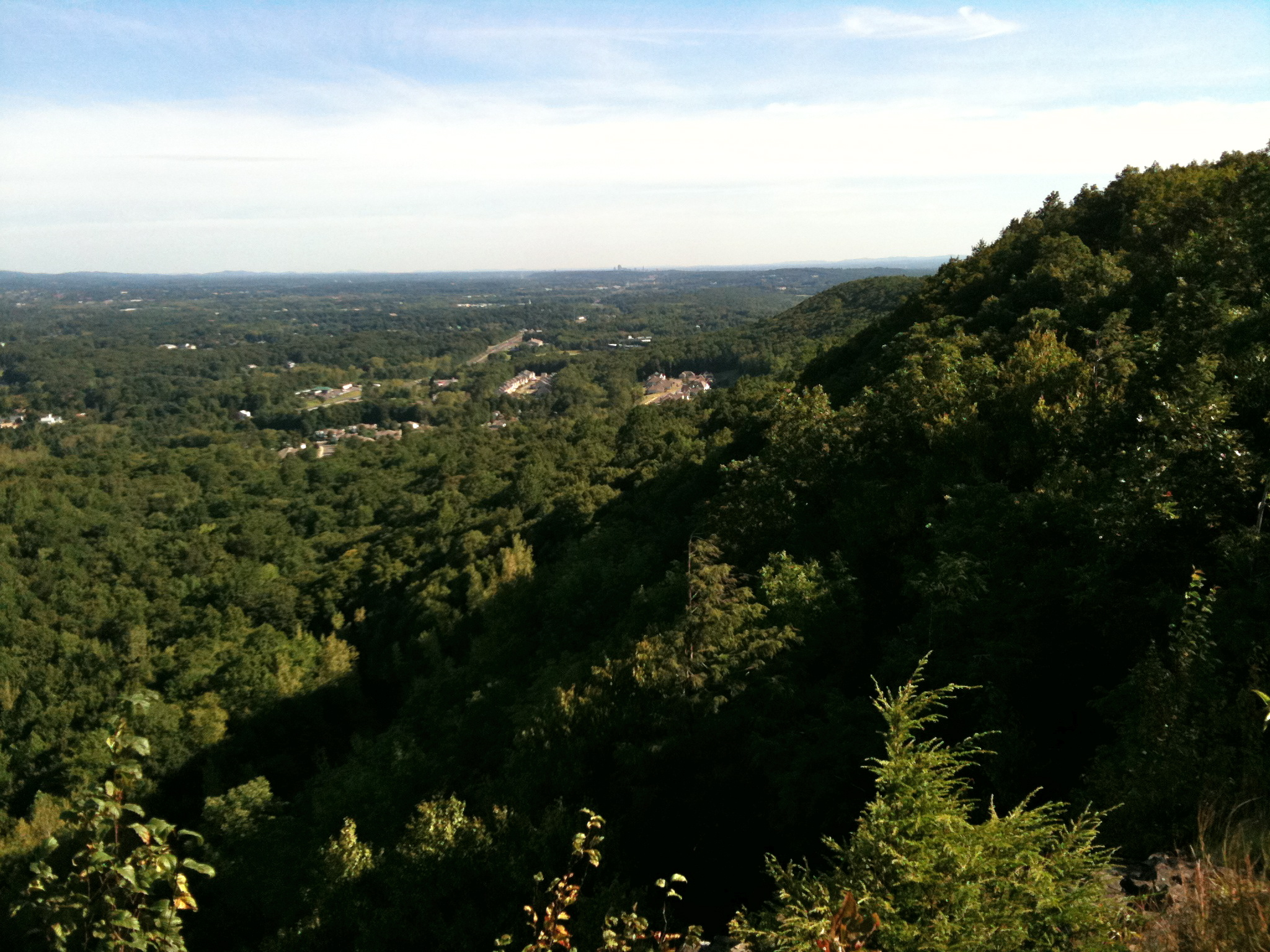
Looking north at Lamentation Mountain from the Lamentation Mountain ridge.

== Recognition / Inspiration Programs ==
The Connecticut Forest and Park Association (CFPA) provides commemorative patches as recognition to hikers completing the entire length of one of the three original Blue-Blazed trails in Connecticut (Quinnipiac, Metacomet and Mattabesett). The Mattabesett Trail patch can be obtained for a small fee ($1) after the hiking the entire trail is completed by contacting the Connecticut Forest and Park Association.

== See also ==
- New England National Scenic Trail
- Mattabesset tribe
- Metacomet Trail
- Metacomet-Monadnock Trail
