= New England National Scenic Trail =

Hiking trail in the United States

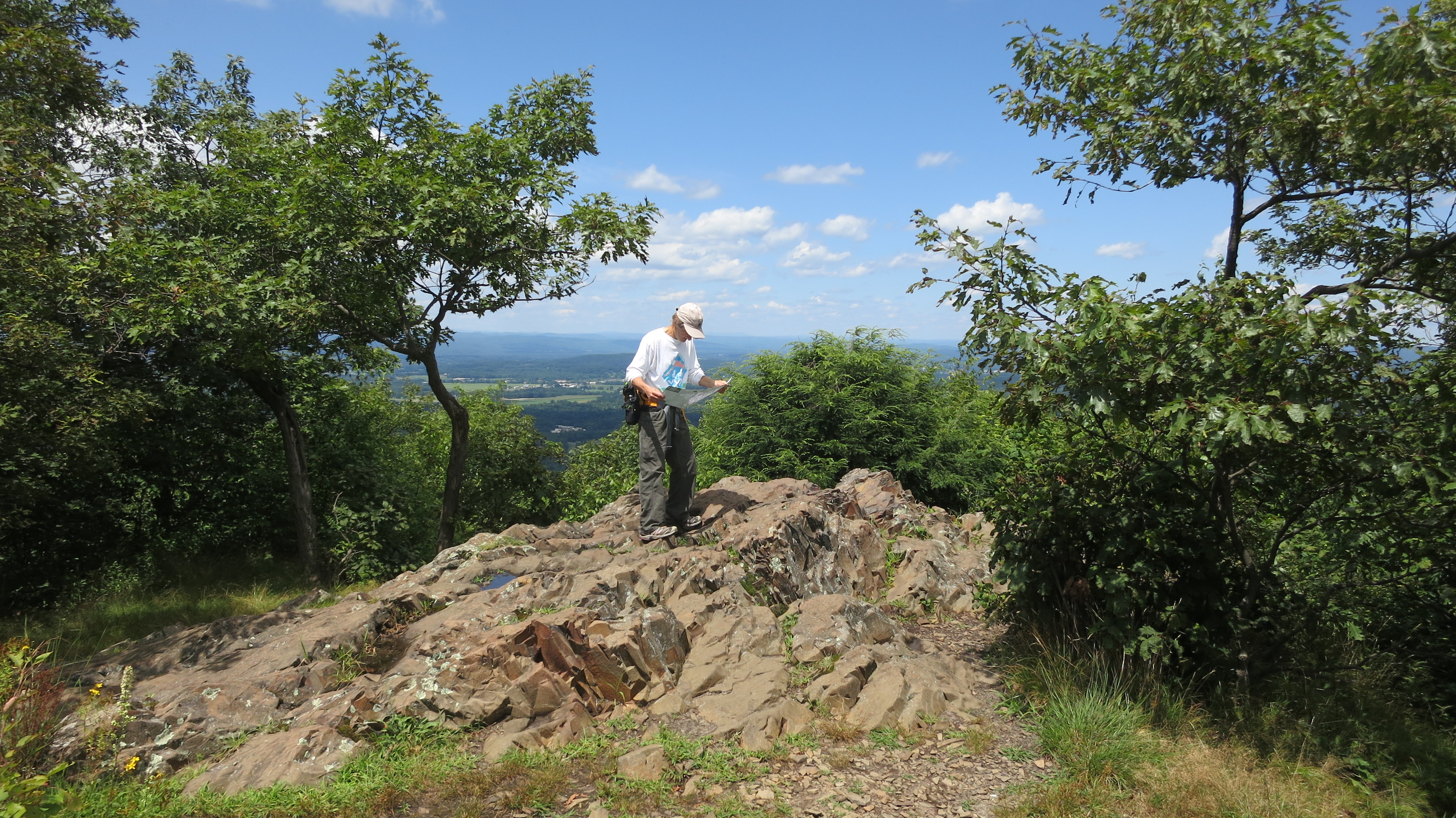
- The summit of Mount Norwottuck in the Holyoke Range provides a panoramic view of the Pioneer Valley.
- Length: Approx. 215 miles (346 km)
- Location: Central Connecticut and western Massachusetts
- Designation: National Scenic Trail
- Trailheads: South: Guilford Harbor, CT; North: MA-32, Royalston, MA
- Use: Hiking
- Highest point: Mount Grace, 1,617 ft (493 m)
- Lowest point: Long Island Sound, Guilford, CT, 0 ft (0 m)
- Difficulty: Moderate to strenuous
- Season: Spring to Fall
- Sights: Mount Tom Range, Connecticut River, Oxbow, Holyoke Range
- Hazards: Severe weather Tick-borne diseases Mosquitos; Yellowjackets; Biting flies Poison ivy Venomous snakes

The New England National Scenic Trail (NET) is a National Scenic Trail in southern New England, which includes most of the three single trails Metacomet-Monadnock Trail, Mattabesett Trail and Metacomet Trail. After the Metacomet-Monadnock-Mattabesett trail system, the trail is sometimes called the Triple-M Trail. The 215-mile (346 km) route extends through 41 communities from Guilford, Connecticut, at Long Island Sound over the Metacomet Ridge, through the highlands of the Pioneer Valley of Massachusetts, to the New Hampshire state border. (The remainder of the M-M Trail to the summit of Mount Monadnock in southern New Hampshire is not included in the designation.) This includes a now (2013) complete connector trail (the Menunkatuck Trail) from the southernmost location of the Mattabesett Trail (in northern Guilford, Connecticut) to the sea (Long Island Sound) and a deviation of the Metacomet-Monadnock Trail in Massachusetts, to lead the trail through state-owned land instead of largely unprotected land.

The trail is administered by the National Park Service, and managed by two non-profit and member-volunteer based organizations: the Connecticut Forest and Park Association in Connecticut, and the Appalachian Mountain Club in Massachusetts. The trail is maintained by the volunteers of these organizations. It became an official unit of the National Park System in 2023.

== History ==
In 2000, the United States Congress authorized the National Park Service to research the new trail composed of the Mattabesett Trail, Metacomet Trail, and Metacomet-Monadnock Trail in Connecticut and Massachusetts. This was backed by Public Law 107-338 (signed by President George W. Bush in December 2002). The argument, as testified before Congress, was that the preservation of the trail system as a recreational resource is only possible through its joint protection.

The draft study was concluded in April 2006, published and made available for public review and comment. At this time, the trail was referred to as the MMM Trail (Metacomet-Monadnock-Mattabesett). Public meetings in Connecticut and Massachusetts on September 26 and 27, 2006, respectively, yielded large support for the project and inquired about trail use and management, and alternative trail routes.

In March 2007, Representative John Olver (D-MA) introduced the New England Scenic Trail Designation Act. Co-sponsors were the Democratic representatives Richard Neal (D-MA), John B. Larson (D-CT), Joe Courtney (D-CT), Rosa DeLauro (D-CT) and Chris Murphy (D-CT); a companion bill was introduced by Senator John Kerry. The bill, proposed amending the National Trail System Act to add the Monadnock, Metacomet and Mattabesett (MMM or triple-M) Trail System as a National Scenic Trail, was passed by the House of Representatives in 2008. This measure was subsequently rolled into the Omnibus Public Land Management Act of 2009, which was signed into law by President Barack Obama on March 30, 2009. The act established three new national scenic trails, including the New England National Scenic Trail.

On March 30, 2009, the New England Scenic Trail was officially designated by United States Public Law 111-11 Section 5202. This section defines the trail as extending from Long Island Sound in Guilford, Connecticut, to the Massachusetts / New Hampshire border. But it also encourages talks with New Hampshire officials and municipalities so as to enable future expansion to Mount Monadnock in New Hampshire.

Since the designation in 2009 there have been two significant changes to the trail. In 2010, a north-south connector (the Menunkatuck Trail) was built from the southernmost point on the Mattabesset Trail section, extending eleven miles south in Guilford, Connecticut. In 2012 and 2013 the remaining four miles to Long Island Sound was completed, primarily traversing the historic central downtown Guilford district south to the town harbor.

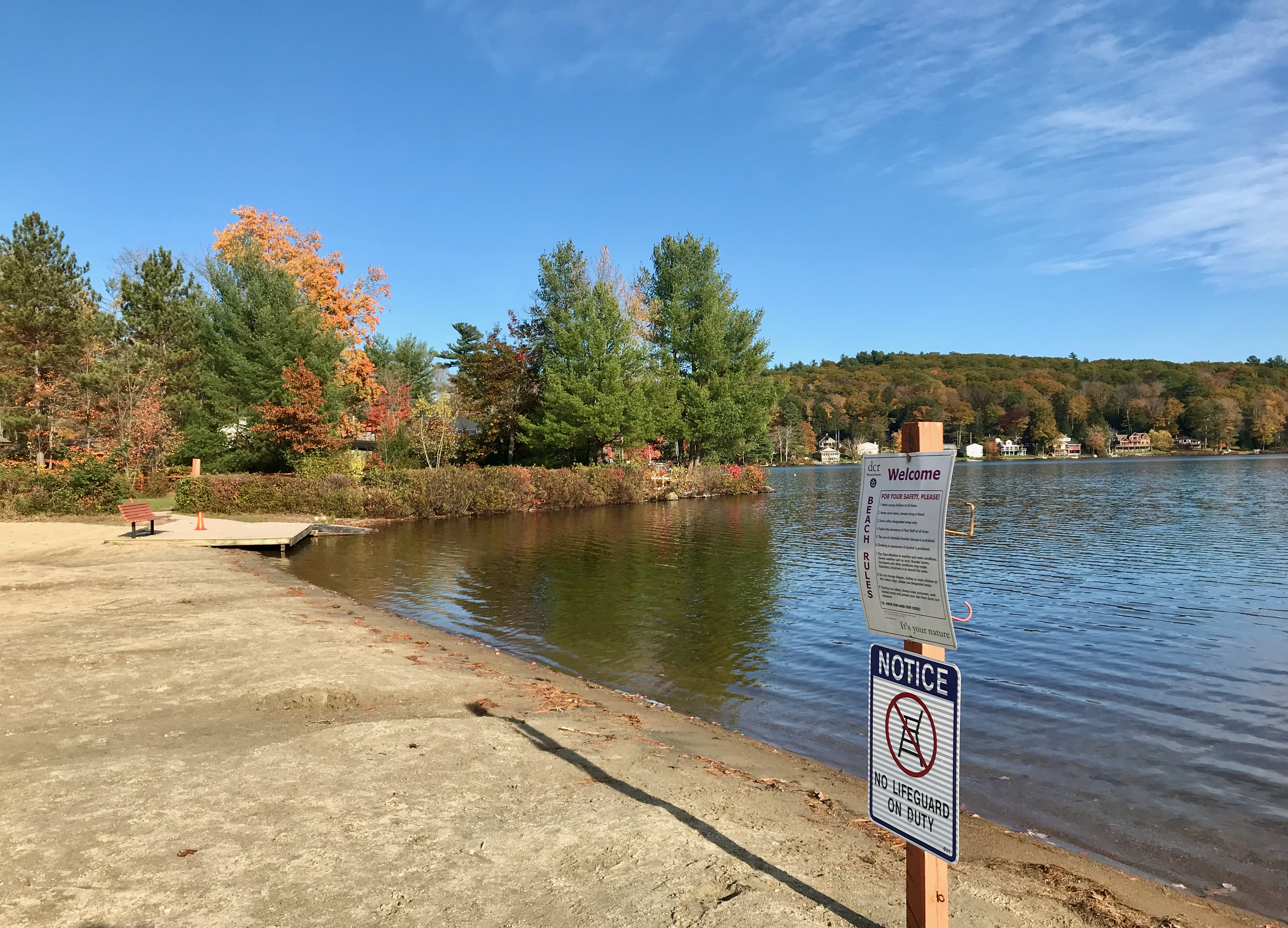
The re-routed MA NET 14 and 15 sections now pass through Lake Wyola State Park and near the shore of Lake Wyola.

Also, in Massachusetts in 2012 and 2013 22 miles (35 km) of the NET's Metacomet-Monadnock trail sections were re-routed. These sections (Massachusetts' NET sections 10-14 and part of 15) had been interrupted for a number of years due to issues where the MM passed through private land (from just northeast of the Holyoke Range north to Massachusetts' Wendell State Forest). These NET/MM sections generally parallel both U.S. Route 202 and the western shore of Quabbin Reservoir. The re-routed section (MA NET 10 - Belchertown, MA) from the eastern descent of the Holyoke Range to the Scarborough Pond Conservation Area now constitutes the longest "road walk" on the Massachusetts portion of the NET.

In 2023, the National Park Service recognized the trail as a unit of the National Park Service. Two other national scenic trails, the Ice Age Trail and the North Country Trail, also became the country’s newest units of the National Park Service.
