= Connecticut Forest and Park Association =

US nonprofit organization

- Abbreviation: CFPA
- Formation: 1895; 131 years ago
- Type: Nonprofit
- Tax ID no.: 06-0613430
- Legal status: 501(c)(3)
- Headquarters: Rockfall, Connecticut
- Board President: Richard Croce
- Executive Director: Andy Bicking
- Website: https://ctwoodlands.org/

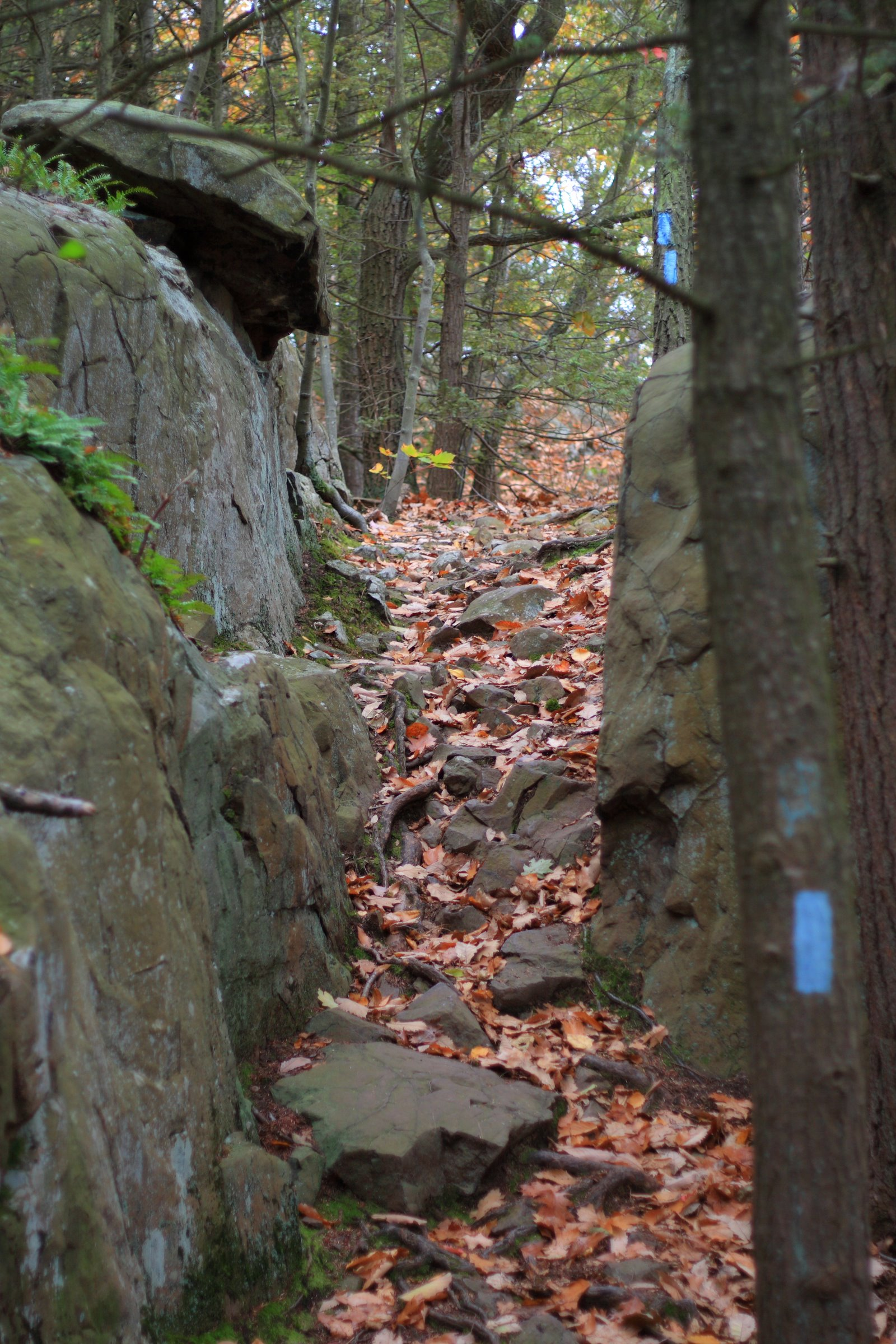
Blue blazes marking the Metacomet Trail

The Connecticut Forest and Park Association (CFPA), established in 1895, is the oldest private, nonprofit conservation organization in Connecticut. The organization is credited as an important early pioneer of the national land conservation movement and as an early advocate of long distance trail building. The mission of the CFPA is “to conserve the land, trails, and natural resources of Connecticut. The CFPA established and maintains the 825-mile Blue-Blazed Trails Hiking Trail system and has been instrumental in acquiring more than 100 state parks and forests across Connecticut.

The organization publishes guidebooks and maps, conducts ecological surveys, provides advice on sustainable forestry, advocates for land conservation, maintains and builds trails, and conducts a variety of educational programs for adults and children. It publishes the “Connecticut Walk Book East” and “Connecticut Walk Book West” for their Blue-Blazed Trails in Eastern and Western Connecticut that are available at many public libraries.

== Blue-Blazed Hiking Trails ==
The CFPA established the Blue-Blazed Hiking Trail System in 1929, when the Quinnipiac Trail was created. This trail system includes more than 825 miles of Blue-Blazed Hiking Trails that pass through 88 towns traversing both public and private lands.

Notable trails managed by the CFPA include the Quinnipiac, Regicides, Nipmuck, Mohawk, Tunxis, Mattatuck, and Shenipsit Trails. The Metacomet and Mattabesett Trails are part of the New England National Scenic Trail, also referred to as Triple-M Trail. This 220 mile route extends from Long Island Sound to Mount Monadnock in Southern New Hampshire.

== Connecticut Woodlands magazine ==
Connecticut Woodlands is a quarterly magazine publication of the CFPA. Originally it began publication in 1936. The print magazine is a benefit for members and supporters of the CFPA, but a collection of previous issues are accessible directly from the website.
