= Cedar Hill, New Haven =

Neighborhood in New Haven, Connecticut

Coordinates: 41°19′21″N 72°53′42″W

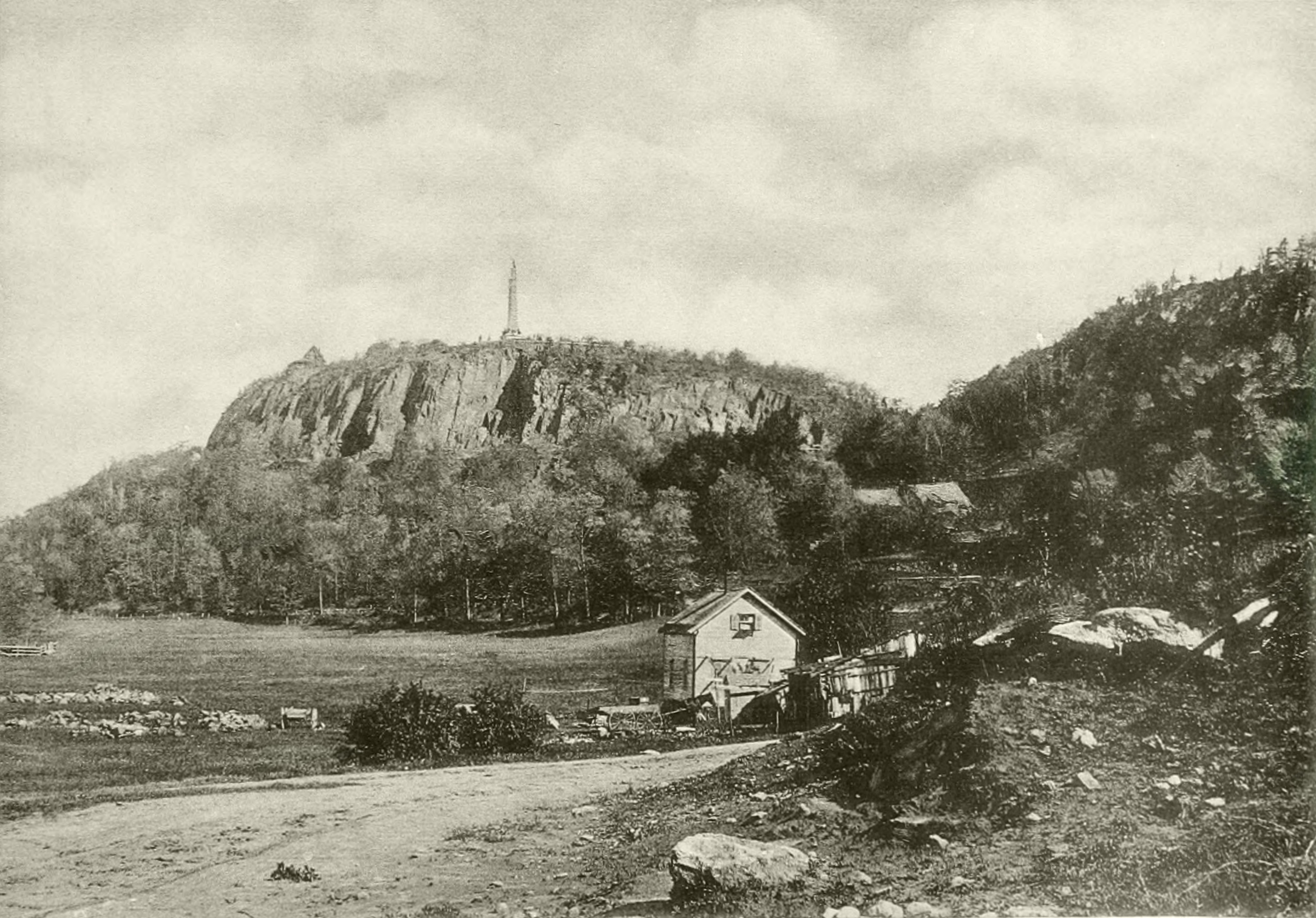
View of East Rock and Indian Head from Cedar Hill Area (now Rice Field), 1898. Note the cedar trees in the background.

Cedar Hill is a neighborhood in New Haven, Connecticut. It includes portions of the city-designated neighborhoods of East Rock, Quinnipiac Meadows, and Mill River. Cedar Hill was named for cedar trees that were once plentiful there in 1665. The area was divided from the local surroundings by the construction of I-91 in the 1960s. Cedar Hill's boundary runs from James Street, up the Mill River, to Rice Field, over Indian Head Rock, to the Hamden town line, across to Middletown Avenue, to the Eastern side of State Street, back up to James Street.

== History ==
=== Early settlement ===
David Atwater was one of the earliest European settlers recorded living in Cedar Hill (at that time called the East Farm). David Atwater, who died October 5, 1692, was the first of the New Haven Colony who was sworn a freeman of the united colony. A farm was assigned to him in the "Neck", the tract between the Mill and Quinnipiac Rivers.

=== 19th century ===
Prior to the mid-19th century, the Cedar Hill district remained one of the most undeveloped portions of New Haven. The earliest significant settlement of the district does not appear to have taken place until the mid or late 1840s. An 1851 map shows that only about a dozen scattered houses and shops were standing in the area by that time. Virtually all of the buildings stood along or close to the area's two principal streets The Road to Wallingford (now known as upper State Street) and the Middletown Turnpike (now known as Middletown Avenue).

The few residents of the area during this period included M. Atwater, J. Matlby, R. Atwater and R. Augur. Major Lyman Atwater (Lyman Street was named after him) and son Lyman Hotchkiss Atwater also were born and lived in Cedar hill. Elias B. Bishop married the Major's daughter Grace (Grace Street in Cedar Hill is named after her; at one time it was the road around the bottom of East Rock and is now partly called Rock Street and English Drive) and bought the Atwater House on State Street, Cedar Hill from the Major when he moved to Vermont. Henry Eld had lived in the area now known as View Street, but when it started becoming more populated he relocated. Charles A. Warren President of the State Street House Railroad Company took over the property his office was at 82G Grand Street, Atwater building.

In 1818 Asclepias lanceolata, which is now called Asclepias viridiflora, was discovered in Cedar Hill by Dr. Eli Ives in 1779.

From the late 1860s through the 1890s most of the development was residential and concentrated it that portion of the area which lay near the junction of State Street and Middletown Avenue.

Rock Street, one of the gateway streets going into East Rock Park, was built in or around 1875. It was originally called the Highway to the top of East Rock. Charles Warren and Charles Blatchley developed the Road. Warren Place in the Cedar Hill was named after Charles Warren. The beginning of the street is now a residential area but the better part of it is now closed to cars but can be hiked up to the top of East Rock.

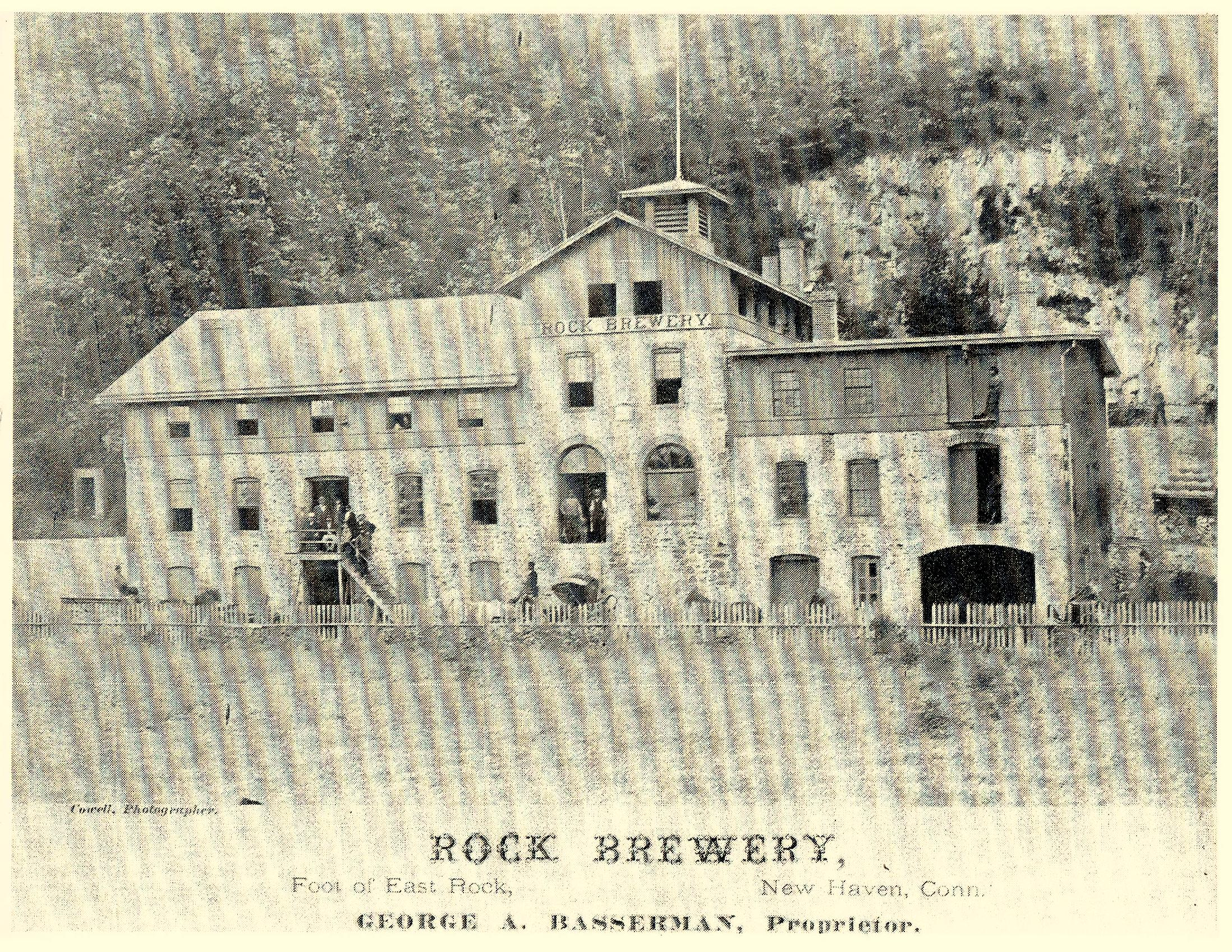
Rock Street Brewery, Cedar Hill, New Haven, CT The Brewery burned down in the 1890s.

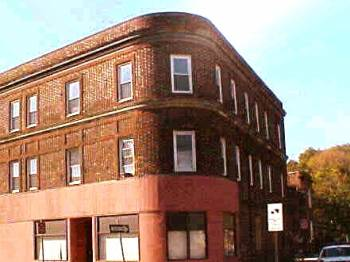
George Basserman apartment building at 1395 State Street

One of the more important light industry built in the area was the Rock Street Brewing Company, owned by George Basserman. Basserman's Rock Brewery on State Street. The brewery took its name from Snake Rock, an extension of East Rock. Basserman owned the brewery and the adjacent apartment building, which still stands on the corner of Rock and 1395 State Street. He sold the property in 1888 to John M. Manning of Buffalo, a brother of the late Daniel Manning. He had plans to enlarge it, before the fire. No exact date of its closing can be found but there is record of a fire in the 1930s.

Until the late 19th century, Cedar Hill was an area of Hamden. When the railyards were built, it was incorporated into New Haven's Fair Haven neighborhood.

=== 20th century ===
The most significant feature of the area's development during the first half of the 20th century was the construction of the Cedar Hill Yard in the central part of the district between State Street and Middletown Avenue.

Begun in 1909 as part of an effort by the New York, New Haven and Hartford Railroad, during the building of the new railyard in Cedar Hill rail men wanted to strike, but were able to get the extra pay to work all the hours the construction of the yard would require. Cedar Hill Yards had 14 yards of the 25 that were in New Haven at the time. The railyard could hold over 15,000 cars at a time. The trolleys were stored in what is now the Connecticut Transit Bus Terminal. The building still stands virtually unchanged from when it housed trolleys. Even though the railyards are now all but empty, they still are a dominant part of the central part of the Cedar Hill District.

The development of Cedar Hill continued at a gradual pace through the early years of the 20th century. Most of the residents of Cedar Hill Avenue at that time were there to help with the Ferry Street Congregational Church work. Grace, May and Cedar Hill Avenues were laid out in the Reconstruction Era. These houses were constructed for the working men of the burgeoning manufacturing industries in the adjacent Fair Haven neighborhood.

The National Folding Box & Paper Co. is on James Street across from the Cedar Hill Station (car barn when there were trolleys), and both buildings still stand today. City lines at the time defined this area as Cedar Hill. It was a large factory for its time, a four-story building over 240,000 sq ft (22,000 m^{2}). Over 22,629 people were employed there. The Bridgeport branch had 23,343. This showed that Bridgeport was the largest manufacturing city in the State during this time, but New Haven was a close second.

Although the economic character of Cedar Hill changed gradually, the architectural complexion of the area appears to have changed little since the late 1940s. The best remaining example of scattered commercial structures built in Cedar Hill is the Michael W. Ferrell Building at 1296-1304 State Street. Mostly brick structures were popping up around the area. An excellent example would also be the John H. Slator Building (built and owned by John Slator, President of the Masons at the time), a late 19th-century Italianate style detached duplex row house at 1515-1517 State Street. And is a registered historical home.

== Present time ==
Up until the 2002 Cedar Hill was part of the Fair Haven District of New Haven. The community members in 2000 (based on the finds of the 2000 census) were asked to vote what district they wanted to be part of because of census results requiring New Haven to redistrict before elections of 2002, they became part of the East Rock district because of the shift of the congressional districts.

== Cedar Hill streets, past and present ==
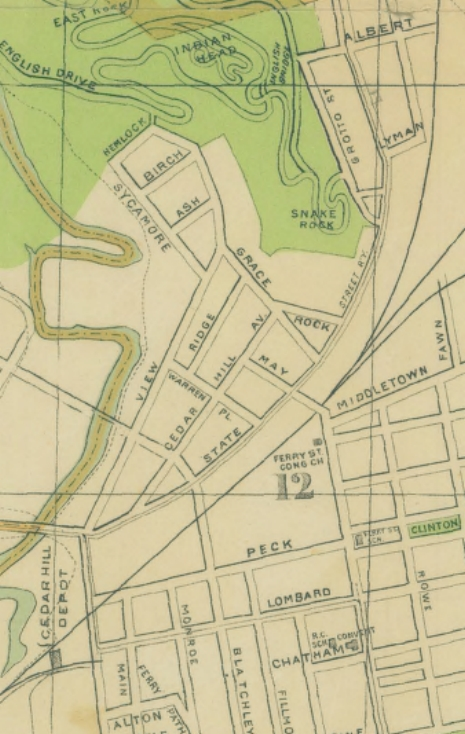
Map of the missing streets from the construction of I-91 in the 1950s; also note the Cedar Hill Depot for the trolleys now housing the CT Transit

This is a list of the original streets of Cedar Hill. When I-91 was built some were removed (marked as gone); see map. The importance of this is that the community is now isolated from its communities on all sides, stalling city services from getting to it. Three other communities in New Haven were isolated in the same way: Mill River, City Point and part of the Annex.

Present streets:

- Welton Street
- Lyman Street
- Albert Street
- Grace Street
- Rock Street
- Ridge Street
- Warren Street State Street
- May Street *Willow Street (turns into Blatchley right on the Cedar Hill Line)
- a small part of James Street

Partially removed streets:

- Cedar Hill Avenue
- View Street
- Some homes removed on State and Willow

Streets removed:

- Hemlock Street
- Sycamore Street
- Ash Street
- Birch Street
- Grotto Street

== Landmarks ==
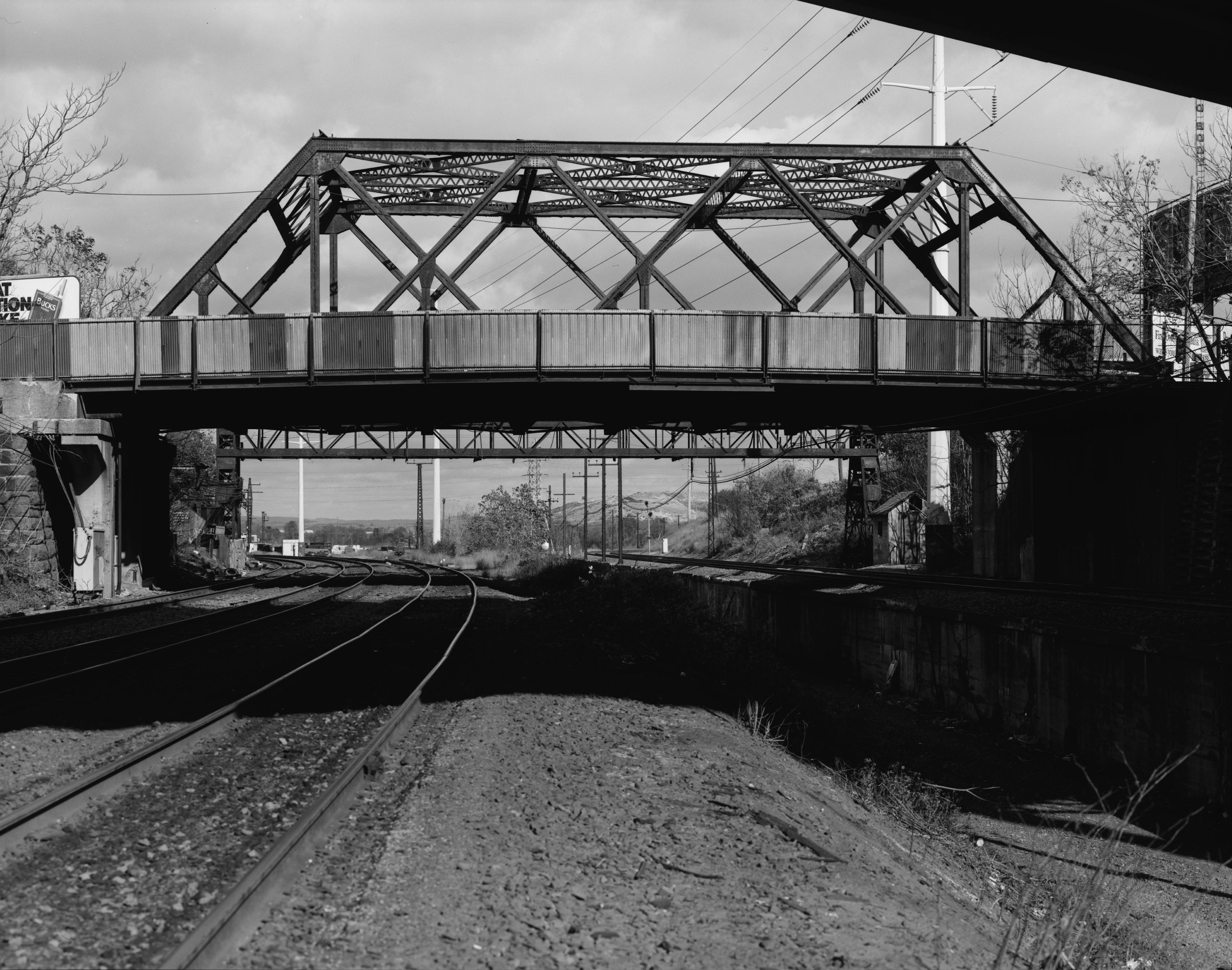
Ferry Street truss bridge in Cedar Hill

- Ferry Street Railroad Bridge is significant as a representative example of standard 20th century truss construction; as a product of Boston Bridge Works, a regionally important bridge fabricator; and as part of the New Haven Railroad's extensive improvements to its freight facilities in Cedar Hill, New Haven, CT.

Between 1910 and 1913, the railroad built a large new classification yard in the northeast part of New Haven, the Cedar Hill Terminal, in order to consolidate and expand its freight operations. In connection with that work, the railroad right-of-way was then further widened to accommodate more tracks, and electrification was extended to the new Cedar Hill yards. The widening required a new bridge at Ferry Street. The bridge was entirely paid for by the railroad with the exception of $316.92 paid by the city of New Haven for a temporary bridge during construction.

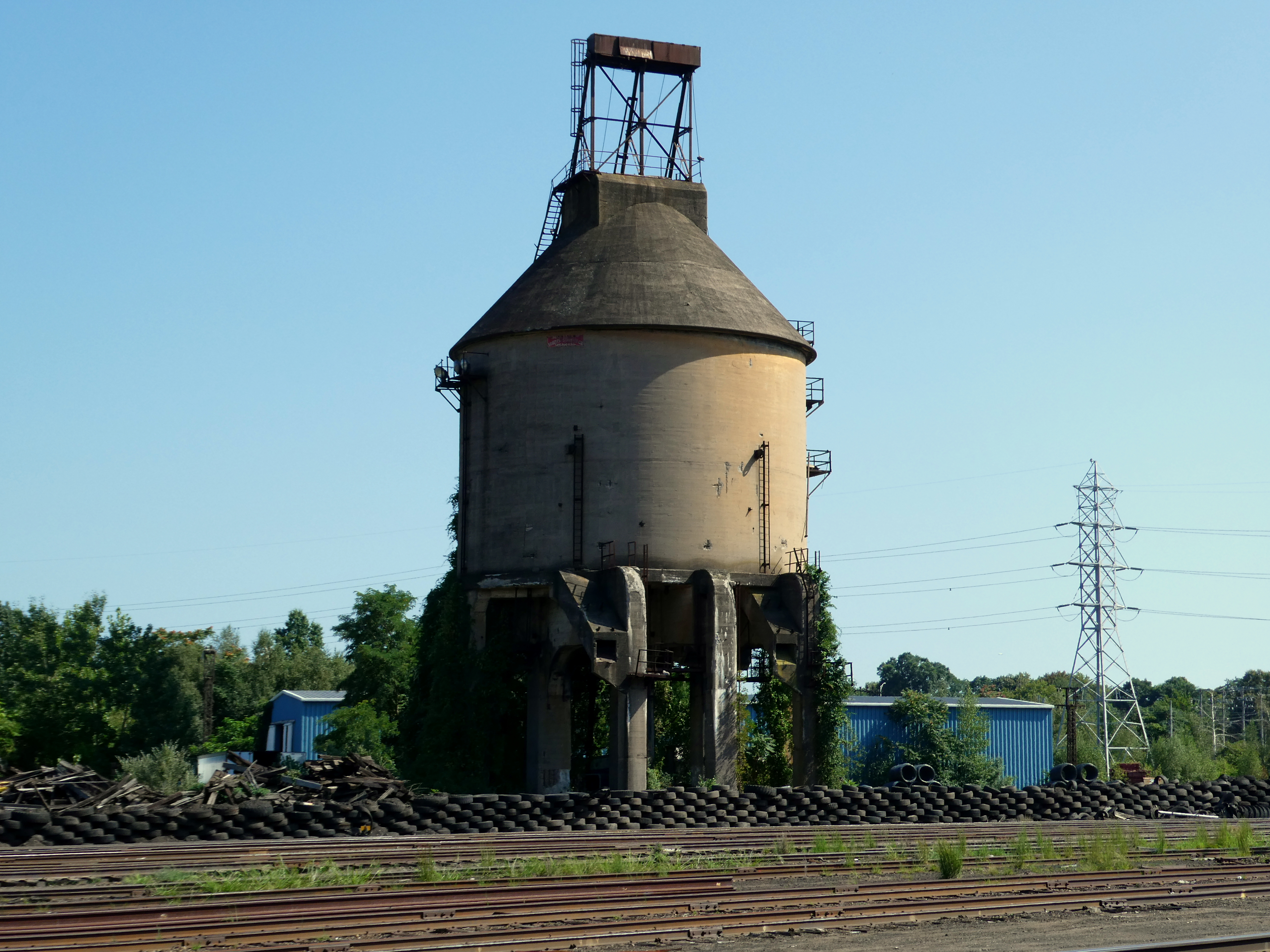
Cedar Hill Coal Tower

- Cedar Hill Coal Tower in the Cedar Hill Yard was a coaling tower for refueling steam locomotives for the New York, New Haven and Hartford Railroad at the "hump". West Hump was closed by the NH during the 1960s, but was briefly reopened in the early Penn Central era to relieve snow-related congestion at Selkirk, NY during the "Lindsay Storm of 1969". East Hump was closed by Conrail in April 1980.

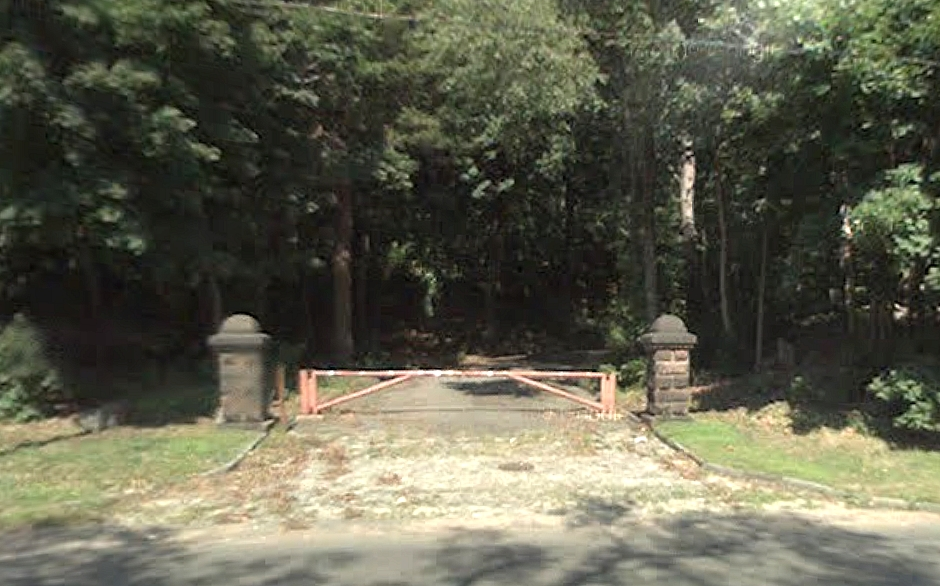
Bishop Gate - State Street Cedar Hill, New Haven, CT - First road to East Rock the trolley used to take people to it.

- Bishop Gate - on State Street across from the old New York, New Haven and Hartford Railroad YMCA - The first road to the top of East Rock was called the Old Stewart's Road. It started near Rice Field in Cedar Hill, up to the summit via the dip between East Rock and Indian Head. The newly formed Parks Commission constructed Indian Head Drive in 1890 which started at Bishops Gate (Mrs. John Bishop sold a good part of her land to the parks department, the land going down to Rock Road at the time) on State Street and over Snake Rock, Indian Head and to the top of East Rock. Bishops Gate has been closed off to motor vehicles due to falling rocks, but the two red traprock pillars still mark the start of a fantastic trail for biking and joggers.
- Snake Rock - The source of the stones used in the construction of Bishops Gate is a broad mass of trap measuring 900 ft (270 m) by 450 ft (140 m) in its two diameters lying encased in sandstone. The height on the rock's eastern side is 160 ft (49 m) and on the west side over 200 ft (61 m). The traprock covers the eastern slope, while the sandstone covers the western slope. At the south end of the rock, behind the property lines on the north side of Rock Street, at a junction of the trap and sandstone, the dip measures about 45°.

Snake Rock contains a half-emerged laccolith, its summit exposed, but with the western wall of sandstone still standing and overtopping the trap. The sandstone shows everywhere the effects of metamorphism, and before industrial encroachments on the rock in the 19th century there was a prominence of columnar sandstone in the southwestern bluff.

- English Gate - Also locally sourced and built in 1890. It is located at the intersection of Rock and View Streets where they end and English Drive begins. It was named after Governor James Edward English who donated a significant amount (along with two others) to the building of the park. One of several vehicular entrances to East Rock Park, English Gate offers the longest, and the most scenic, drive to the summit of East Rock.

== Bibliography ==
- Genealogical Register of the Descendants in the Male Line of David Atwater, one of the original planters of New Haven, to the sixth generation, 1873
- New Haven Resources Inventory Phase III Northern New Haven pages 6–9, written by the city of New Haven, found in the New Haven Historical Library
