= East Rock, New Haven =

Neighborhood in New Haven, Connecticut

East Rock
- Neighborhood of New Haven
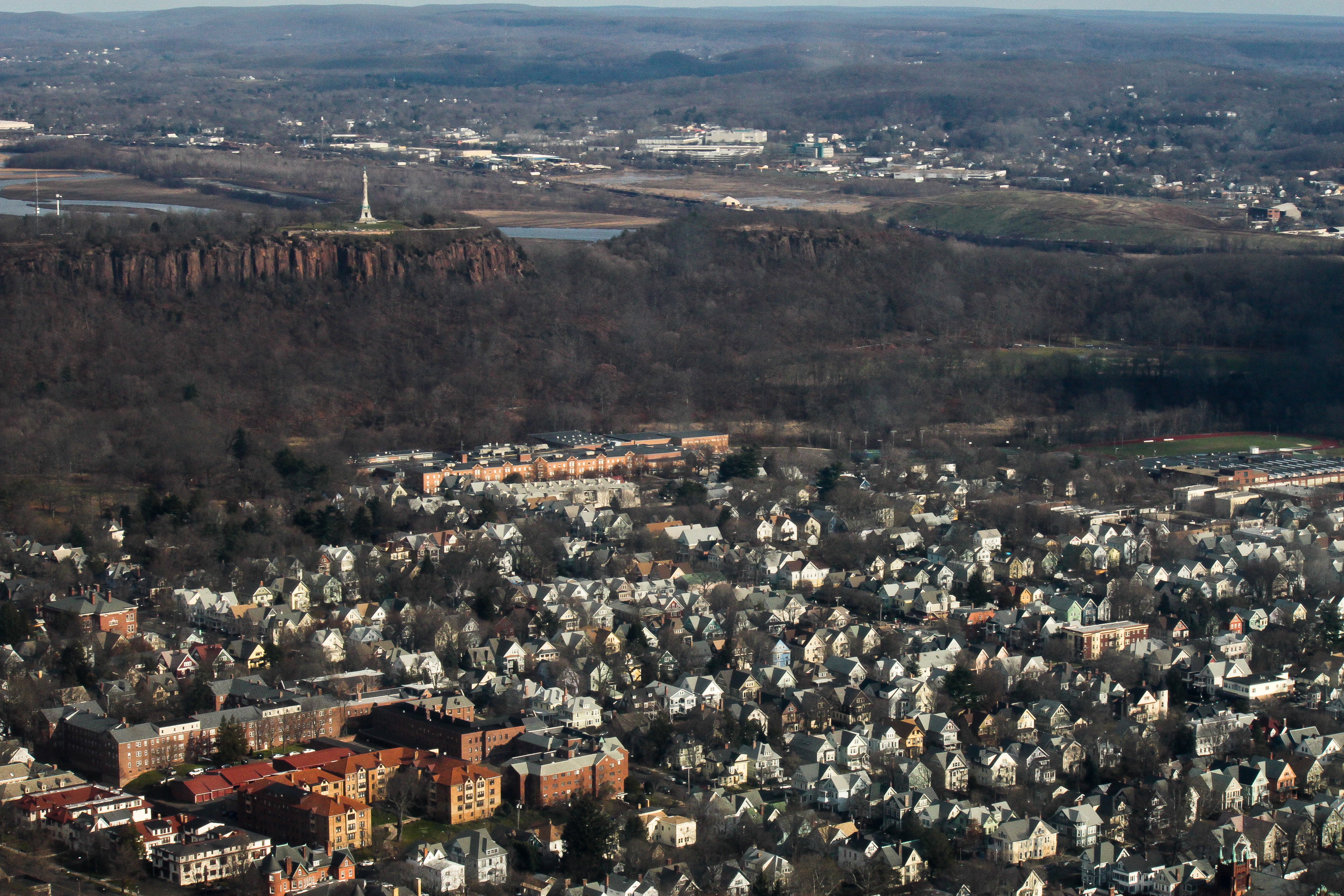
- East Rock neighborhood with the trap rock feature for which it is named, behind

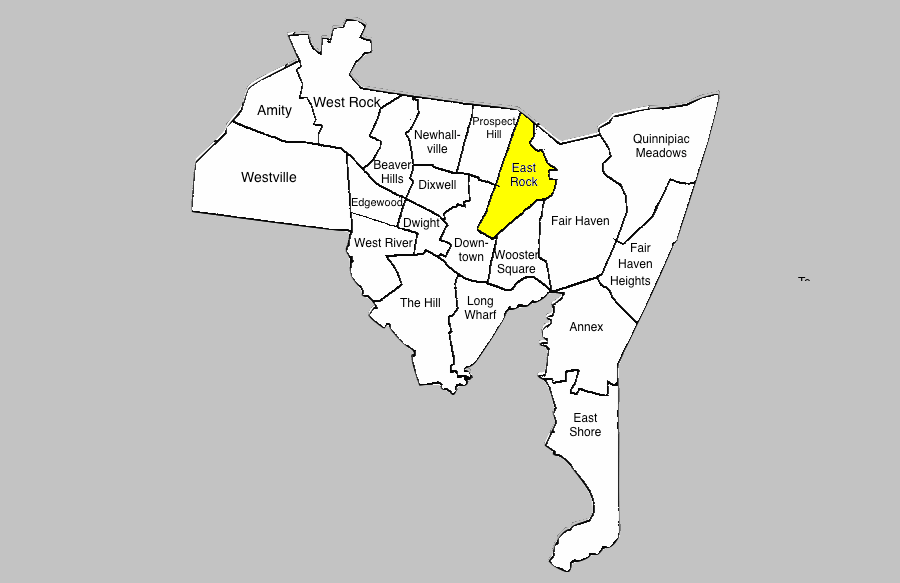
- East Rock within New Haven
- Coordinates: 41°19′16″N 72°54′25″W
- Country: United States
- State: Connecticut
- City: New Haven

East Rock is a neighborhood in the city of New Haven, Connecticut, named for nearby East Rock, a prominent trap rock ridge. The area is home to a large group of Yale students, staff, and faculty, as well as many young professionals and families.

== About ==
Writing in the Times Literary Supplement, Hirsh Sawhney describes East Rock as a "yuppie enclave", which is "increasingly composed of wealthy professionals and graduate students, most of whom are affiliated with Yale University, whose lavish campus lies just over a mile away". East Rock is also a popular destination for cyclists, as a city bike lane runs along Orange Street, the neighborhood's spine. East Rock is one of the safest neighborhoods in New Haven County. East Rock is home to East Rock Park, which is frequently visited by families and tourists.

== History ==
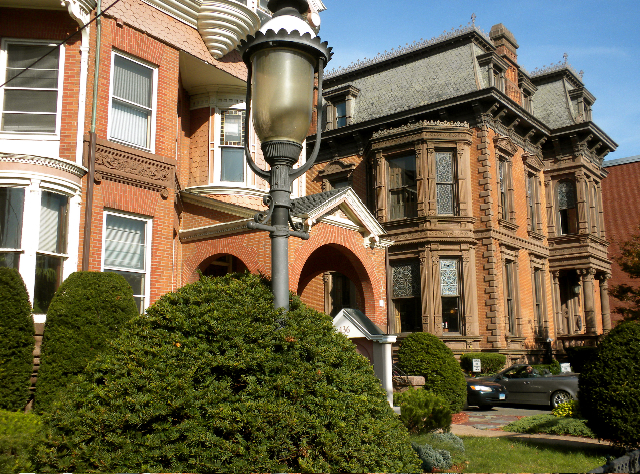
Houses in the Orange Street Historic District

The current East Rock neighborhood remained unsettled farmland into the 1800s, when its largest landowner was Abraham Bishop, a prominent New Haven lawyer and businessman. The southernmost streets were developed first, between the late 1830s and 1860, as these were nearest to the industrializing city center. Following Bishop's death in 1844, the rest of the neighborhood was gradually subdivided and developed.

Sub-neighborhoods developed as New Haven continued to industrialize and grow, with immigrants arriving to take newly available jobs. An Irish community developed in Goatville (around Upper State Street) and a Polish population formed around St. Stanislaus Roman Catholic Church. A commercial district developed on Upper State Street. By 1900 most of the neighborhood's land was developed. The final blocks, near East Rock Park, were developed in the first decades of the 1900s.

Throughout its history East Rock has contained residences of faculty and alumni from neighboring Yale University. As the university has grown, the East Rock neighborhood has increasingly housed the university's graduate students and researchers while many faculty now live outside New Haven's borders.

During the late 20th century a series of businesses were developed on primarily residential Orange Street, including markets and coffee shops. During the 2010s a large-scale addition of 238 apartments was constructed on the 'Corsair' site, a former airplane propeller factory on Upper State Street.

== Geography ==
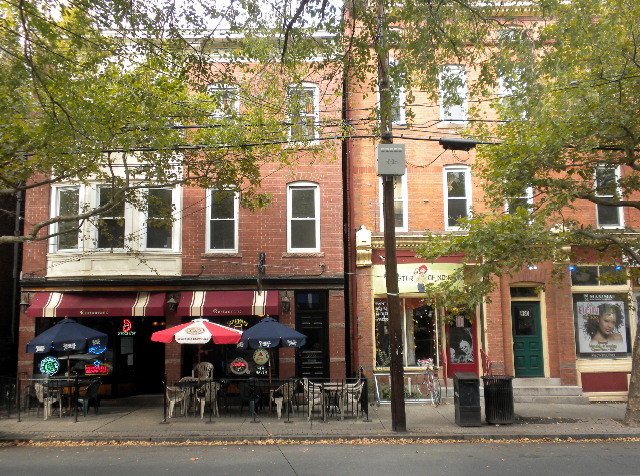
Restaurants on Upper State Street, East Rock's main commercial strip

The neighborhood is bordered on the north by the town of Hamden, on the east by Amtrak railroad tracks, on the southeast by Interstate 91 (between Exits 3 and 6), on the south by Trumbull Street, and on the west by Whitney Avenue. The northeast corner of the area, separated from the main neighborhood by the Mill River and the East Rock hill, is part of the community known as Cedar Hill.

The neighborhood is divided between New Haven's ninth and tenth aldermanic wards. Before redistricting, it lay in the fifteenth ward; the area was the subject of William Lee Miller's book The Fifteenth Ward and the Great Society. The western half of the neighborhood (west of Orange Street) is within the Whitney Avenue Historic District. The southerly parts of the neighborhood are also listed as historic districts: Upper State Street Historic District along State Street, and Orange Street Historic District along Orange Street. The northern portion of the neighborhood is occupied by part of East Rock Park.

== Notable sites ==
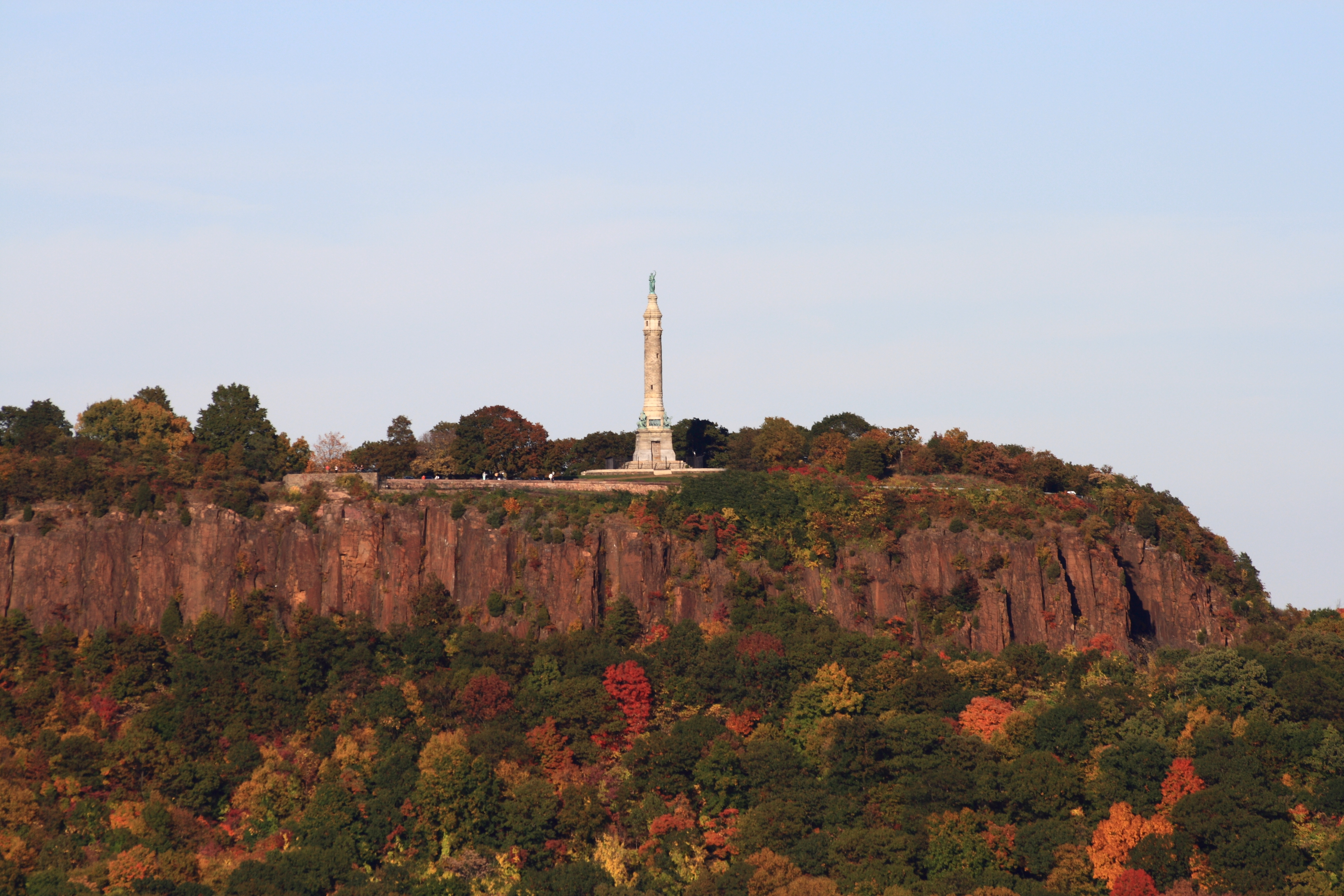
East Rock with its trap rock cliffs and Soldiers & Sailors monument

- East Rock Park
- New Haven Lawn Club
- Wilbur Cross High School
- Worthington Hooker School
- Cedar Hill neighborhood
- St. John's Episcopal Church
- St. Joseph's Catholic Church
- The Anderson Mansion

== List of streets ==
Street	Origin of name	Other
Anderson Street	possibly William S. Anderson of Boston, who owned land in the area	
Alburt Street		
Avon Street	probably Avon, New York	
Bishop Street	Bishop family, heirs of Abraham Bishop	
Bradley Street	Abraham Bradley, landowner	previously named Third Street as well as Marshall Street
Burns Drive	possibly James Burns, painter, or Mary C. Burns, mother of John W. Bishop, landowner	
Canner Street	either Henry Caner, Bostonian constructor of Yale College, or his son Dr. Henry Caner, rector of King's Chapel in Boston.	The name of the street has become misspelled with time.
Cedar Hill Avenue	Named after the Cedar Trees that once grew in the area	
Clark Street	Mary Ann Clark, daughter of Abraham Bishop	
Cold Spring Street	named for a cold spring that sourced from the Mill River	
Cottage Street	named for a Greek villa on the estate of wealthy New Yorker Henry Whitney	previously called Amity Place
Eagle Street		previously called North Vernon Street
East Rock Road	East Rock	previously called Rock Lane
Edwards Street	probably Pierpont Edwards	
Eld Street	Lt. Henry Eld who originally settled in Cedar Hill	
Everit Street	Richard Mansfield Everit, landowner	
Farnum Drive		
Foster Street	Stella Bishop Foster, daughter of Abraham Bishop	
Grace Street	Grace Clarissa, Major Lyman Atwater's daughter who was married to Elias B. Bishop	
Humphrey Street	David Humphreys	previously Humphreys
Lawrence Street	Cornelia Lawrence, daughter-in-law of James Hillhouse	
Lincoln Street	Abraham Lincoln	previously Clinton Place
Linden Street	named for the Linden tree	
Livingston Street	Maria Whitney Livingston, heir to Henry Whitney's estate	
Lyman Street	Named after Major Lyman Atwater	
May Street		
Mechanic Street	houses were built on this street for mechanics of the Marlin Firearms Co.	
Mitchell Drive	Donald D. Mitchell, landscape gardener	
Nash Street	possibly Thomas Nash, gunsmith, or Burr Nash, blacksmith	
Nicoll Street	Caroline B. Nicoll, daughter of Abraham Bishop	
North Bank Street		located on the south bank of the Mill River
Orange Street	William III of England, Prince of Orange	one of the first paved streets in the city, called Mill Lane in colonial days
Pearl Street	named for the pearly oyster shells covering the roads	
Pleasant Street		
Ridge Street		
Rock Street	The Highway to East Rock is its nickname built by Mr. Warren and Mr. Blatchley	previously called Rock Lane
State Street		Previously named Neck Lane "The Neck", Hancock Avenue
Trumbull Street	named for the widow of Jonathan Trumbull	previously called New Street, then Second Street
View Street	the original place of residence of Henry Eld	
Warren Place	Charles Warren, one of the two men that built the road to the top of East Rock	
Welton Street	One of the main Streets to the Cedar Hill Rail Yards	
Whitney Avenue	Eli Whitney	previously Long Lane
Willow Street	Willow trees on the river bank	

== Bibliography ==
=== Print ===
- Harrison's Illustrated Guide: Greater New Haven ISBN 0-927054-39-6
- The Streets of New Haven – The Origin of Their Names, 2nd edition 1998 ISBN 0-943143-02-0
