= East Rock Park =

- U.S. National Register of Historic Places
- U.S. Historic district
- Location within Connecticut Location within the United States
- Location: Roughly bounded by State, Davis, Livingston Streets, Park and Mitchell Drives, and Whitney Avenue, New Haven, Connecticut
- Coordinates: 41°19′48″N 72°54′16″W
- Area: 427 acres (173 ha)
- Architect: Mitchell, Donald Grant; Olmsted Brothers, et al.
- Architectural style: Queen Anne, Shingle Style, Tudor Revival
- NRHP reference No.: 97000299
- Added to NRHP: April 15, 1997

East Rock Park is a park in the city of New Haven and the town of Hamden, Connecticut, that is operated as a New Haven city park. The park surrounds and includes the mountainous ridge named East Rock and was developed with naturalistic landscaping. The entire 427-acre (173 ha) park is listed on the National Register of Historic Places.

== Description ==
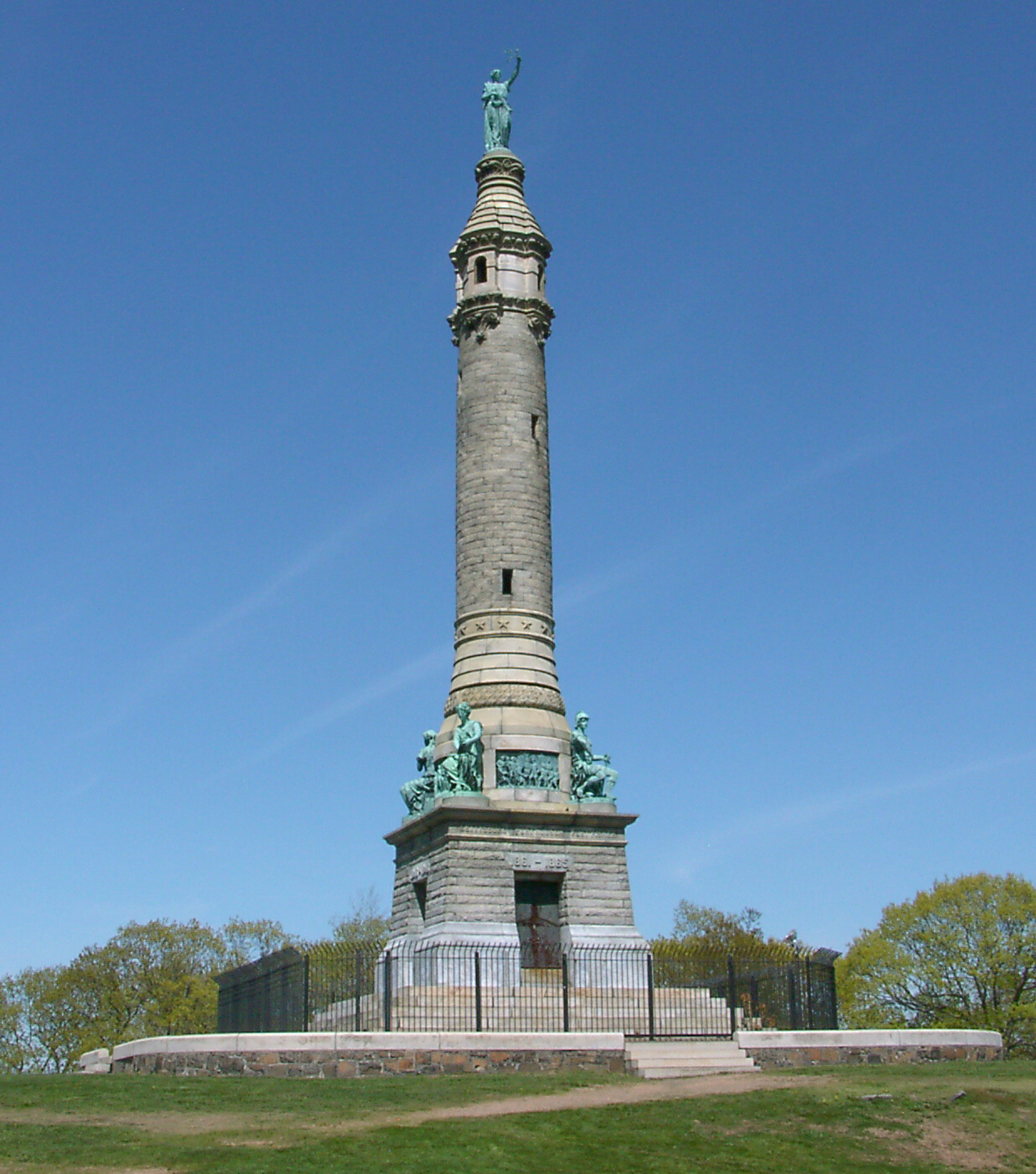
Soldiers and Sailors Monument

East Rock is a popular outdoor recreation destination among residents and visitors of the greater New Haven region. Views from the clifftops span metropolitan New Haven, Long Island Sound, and Long Island. The park is open year-round to hikers and walkers. The automobile road is open April 15 to November 1, 8 a.m. to sunset and November 1 to March 31, Friday, Saturday, Sunday, and holidays, 8 a.m. to 4 p.m., weather permitting. Activities permitted in the park include hiking, snowshoeing, cross-country skiing, picnicking, bicycling (on roads and city-designated mountain bike trails only), boating (on the Mill River), bird watching, and dog walking. Rock climbing, swimming, and alcoholic beverages are prohibited. A number of hiking trails traverse the ridge, most notably the Giant Steps Trail which ascends to the summit at a near-vertical pitch from the south. At the foot of the mountain are located football, baseball, and soccer fields, tennis courts, basketball courts, and playgrounds. The Trowbridge Environmental Center is open Thursdays and Fridays from 10:00 am to 5:00 pm, and at least one Saturday a month for public programs; it offers displays and information about the geology and ecosystem of East Rock. The Pardee Rose Garden and Greenhouse features roses and other flowering plants from spring to fall, and is a popular place to shoot wedding pictures.

The park's layout is the work of Donald Grant Mitchell and the Olmsted Brothers. The covered bridge is named after A. Frederick Oberlin, a local hero of the First World War.

Friends of East Rock, New Haven Graffiti Clean up. The experienced rock climbers of the group rappelled off the rock to get the harder to reach places.

The Friends of East Rock Park organization, founded in 1982, is a community and environmental advocacy group that assists with park maintenance by hosting social events and volunteer work days.

== National Register of Historic Places ==
The National Register of Historic Places listing for East Rock Park recognizes six contributing buildings, one other contributing structure, six contributing objects and one contributing site The park's historic, contributing elements include:

- English Gate, c. 1890, at View Street, with trap rock
- Pardee Rose Garden, 1922, on State Street
- Bishop Gate, c. 1890, on State Street, with trap rock
- Director's Residence, c. 1900
- Sheep Barn, c. 1900, a large Colonial/Shingle-style building
- Queen Anne Barn, c. 1900
- Greenhouses, 1920s
- Soldiers' and Sailors' Monument, from 1887, a 122-foot monument at the summit
- Whitney Gate, c. 1890 on Whitney Avenue, with brownstone
- Walls, c. 1900
- East Rock Road Bridge, a steel arch span bridge from the 1940s

There are also a contributing storage shed and a number of non-contributing buildings.

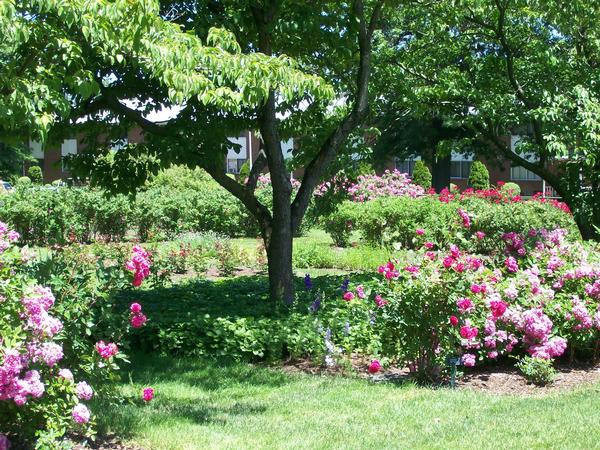
Pardee Rose Garden

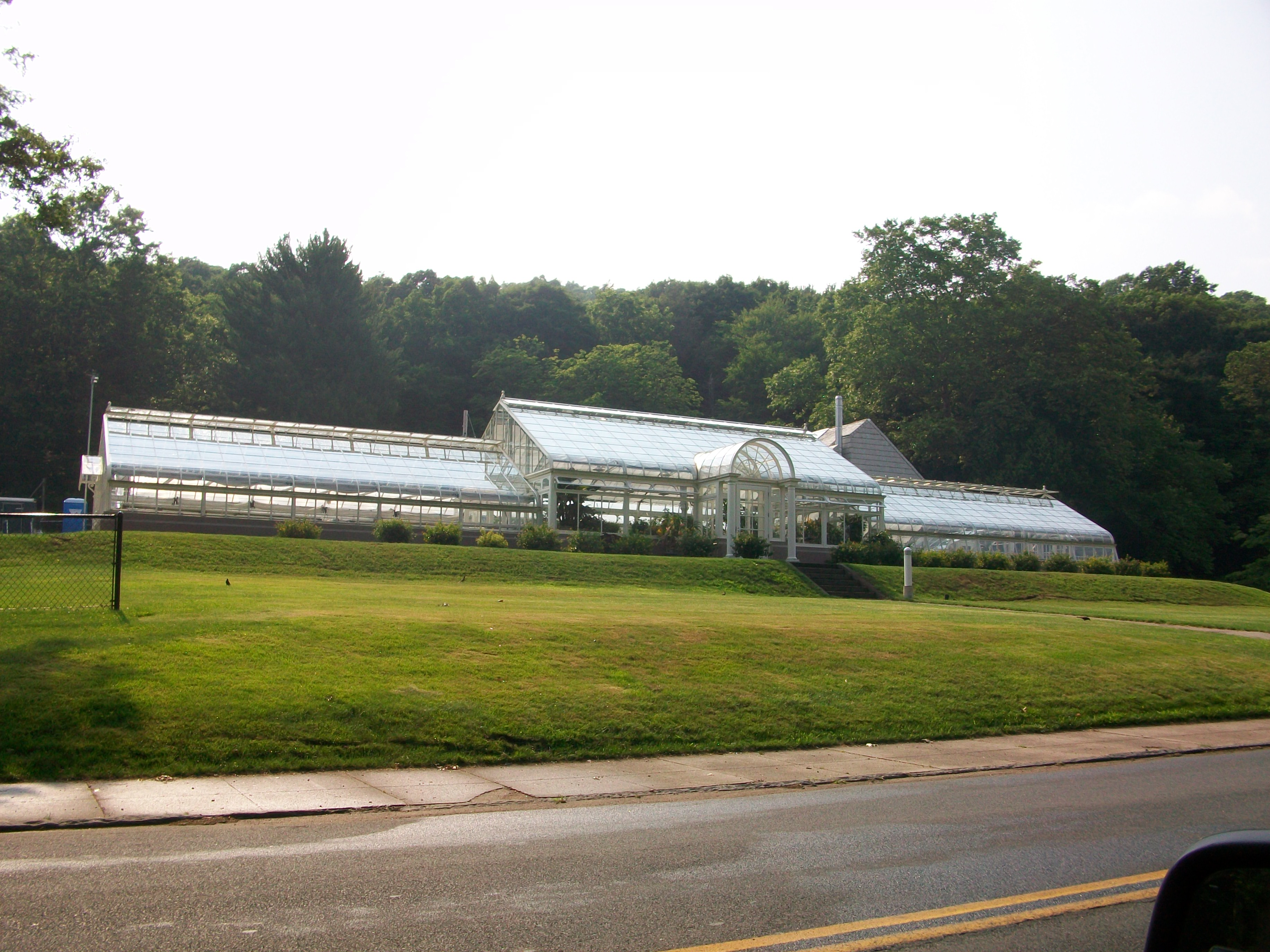
Greenhouses and Learning center at Pardee Rose Gardens

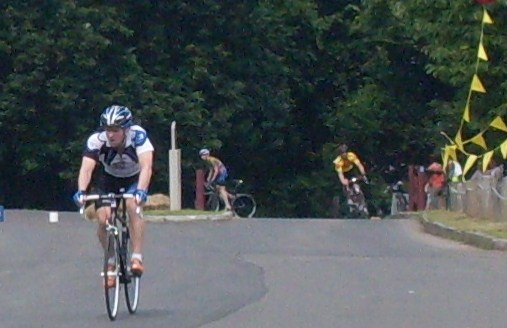
Annual cycling race

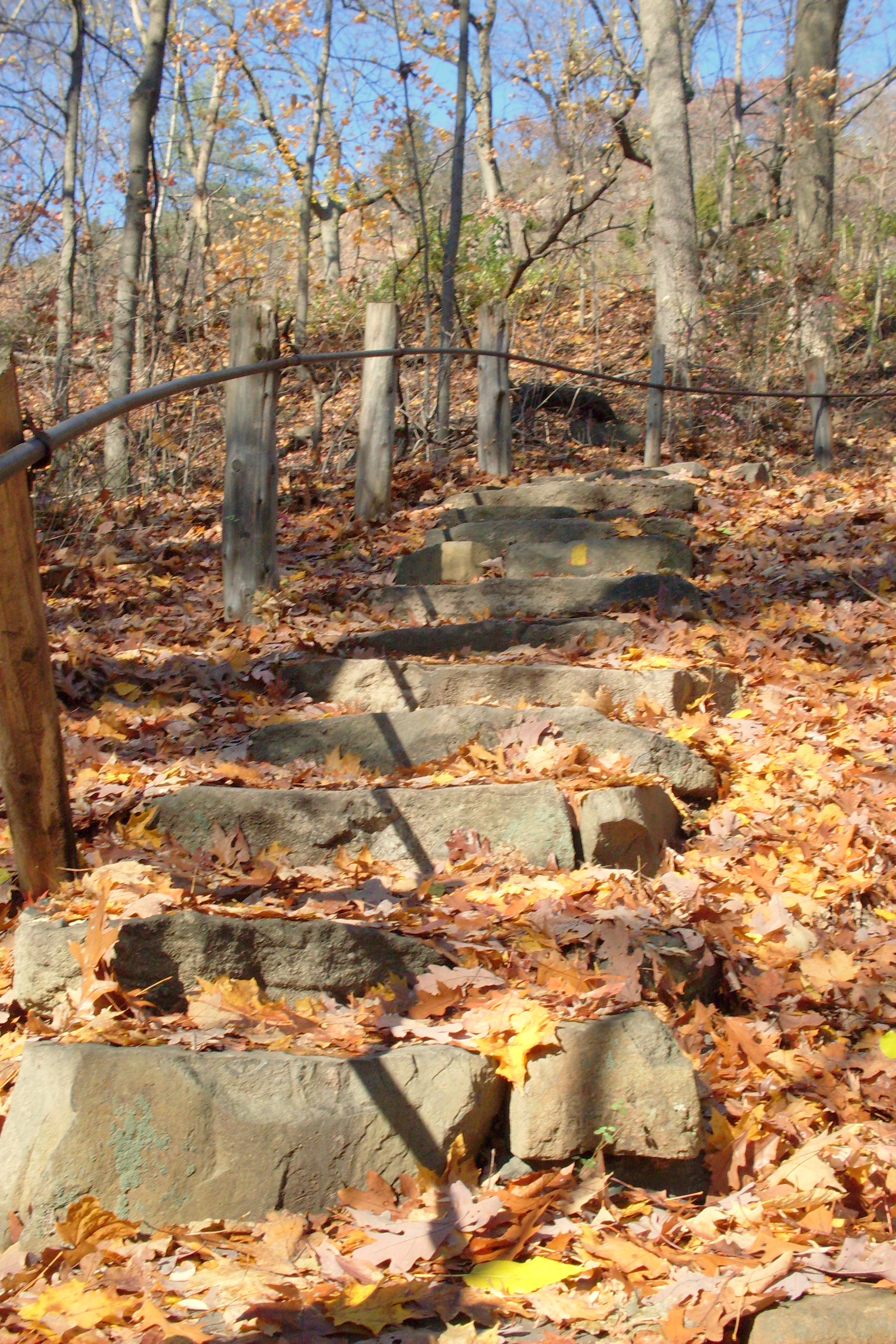
The stairs to the top of East Rock

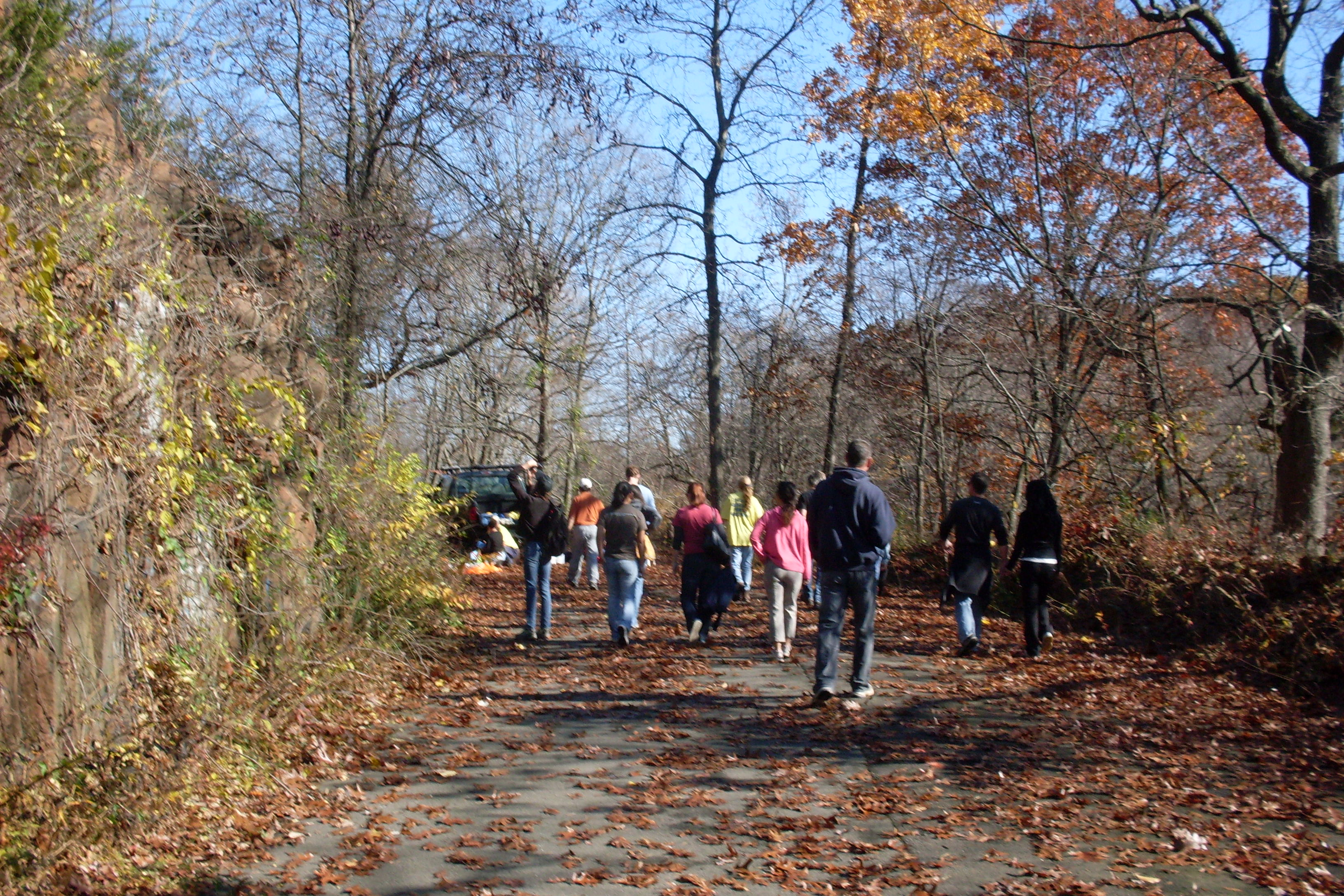
The paved hiking road to the top of East Rock

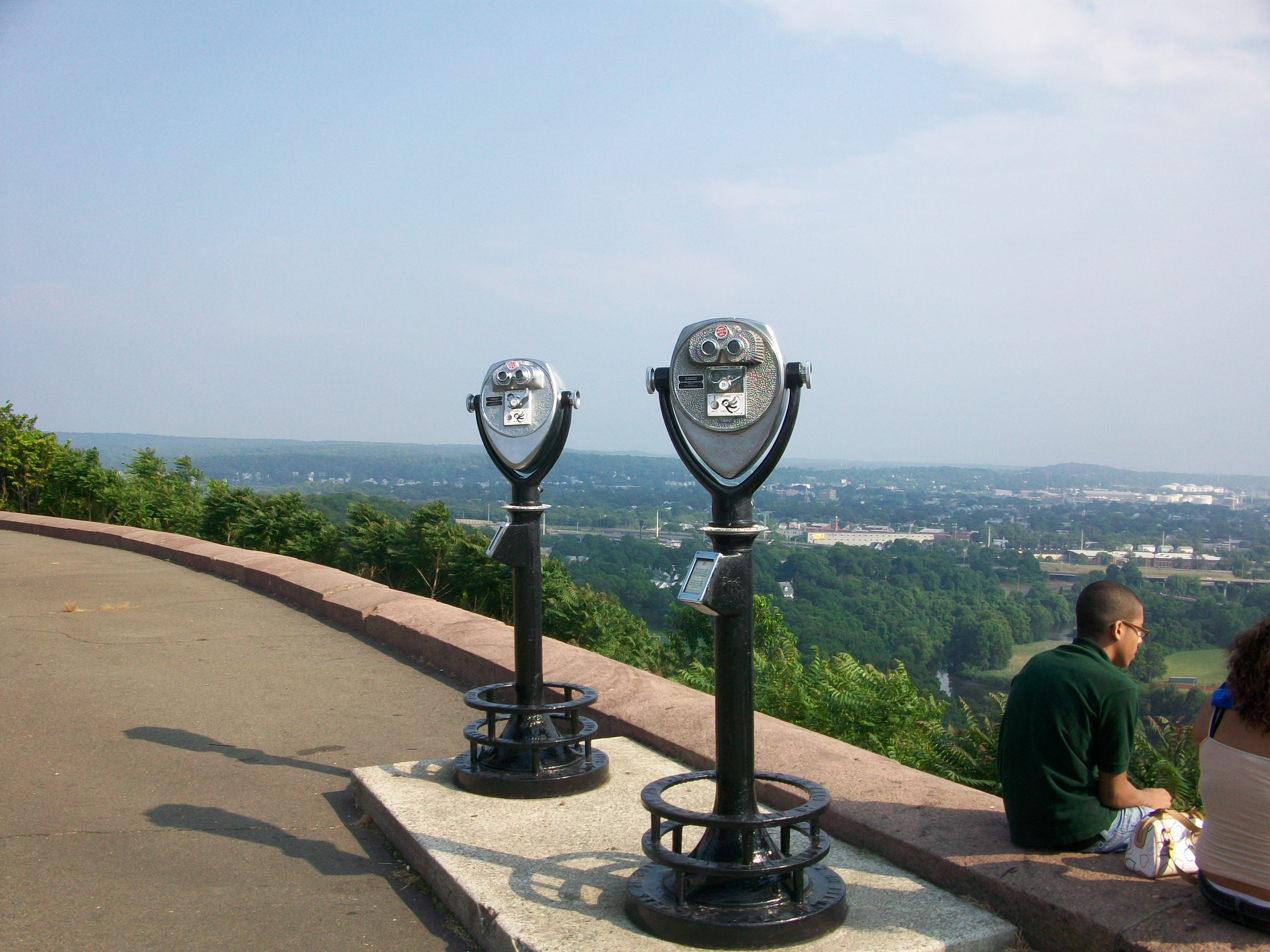
View the city and harbor

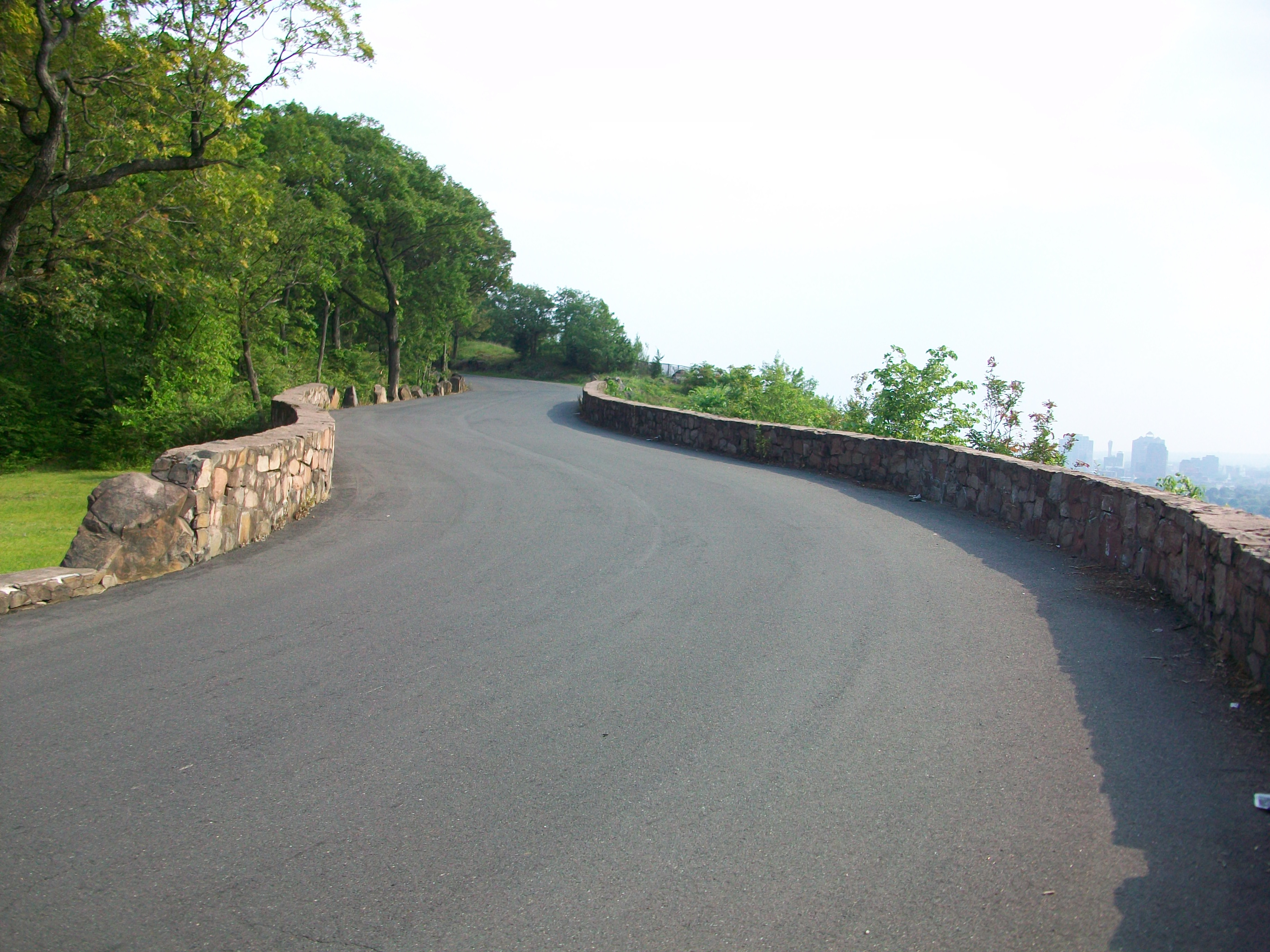
The historic walls on the roadway to the Summit

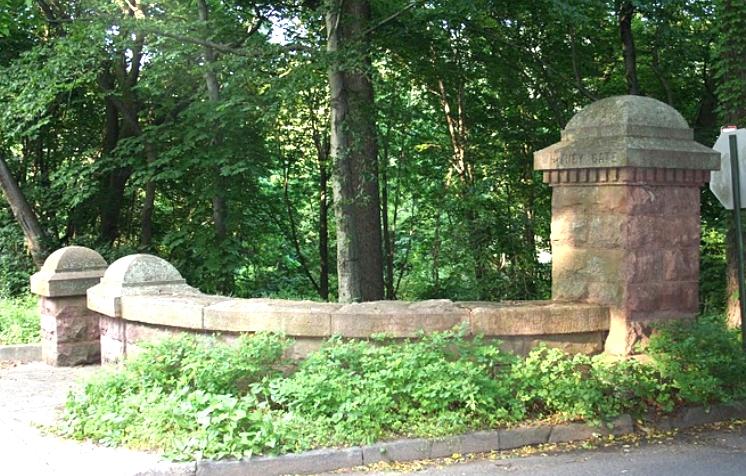
Whitney Gate

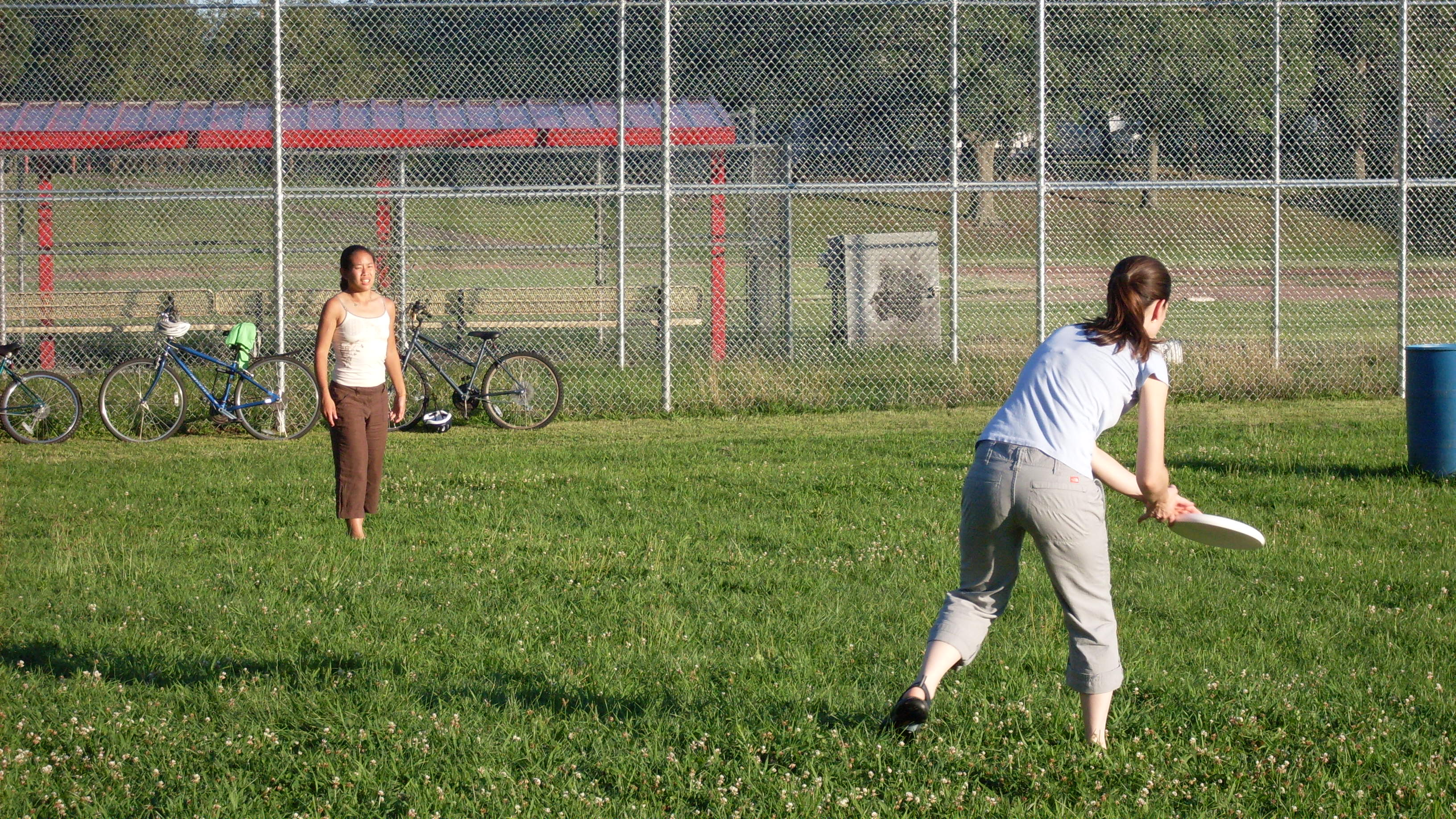
Frisbee players at Rice Field. The Frisbee was invented in New Haven

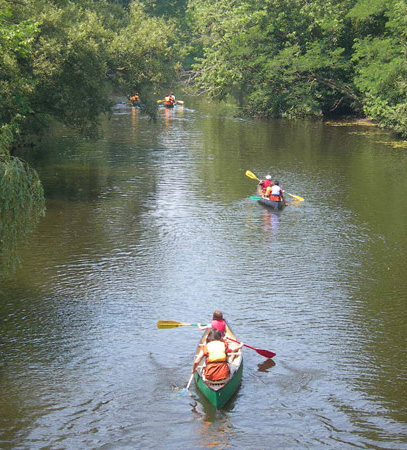
Canoeing down the Mill River

== See also ==
- East Rock (neighborhood)
- Cedar Hill (New Haven)
- Mill River (Connecticut)
- National Register of Historic Places listings in New Haven, Connecticut
- National Register of Historic Places listings in New Haven County, Connecticut
