= Frank Rice =

Frank Rice may refer to:

- Frank Rice (actor) (1892–1936), American actor
- Frank Rice (politician) (1845–1914), New York politician
- Frank P. Rice (1838–1923), Georgia (US) politician
- Frank J. Rice (1869–1917), Republican mayor of New Haven, Connecticut
- Franklin Pierce Rice (1852–1919), publisher, historian and antiquarian

== See also ==
- Francis Rice (disambiguation)
