= George Basserman =

German-American brewer

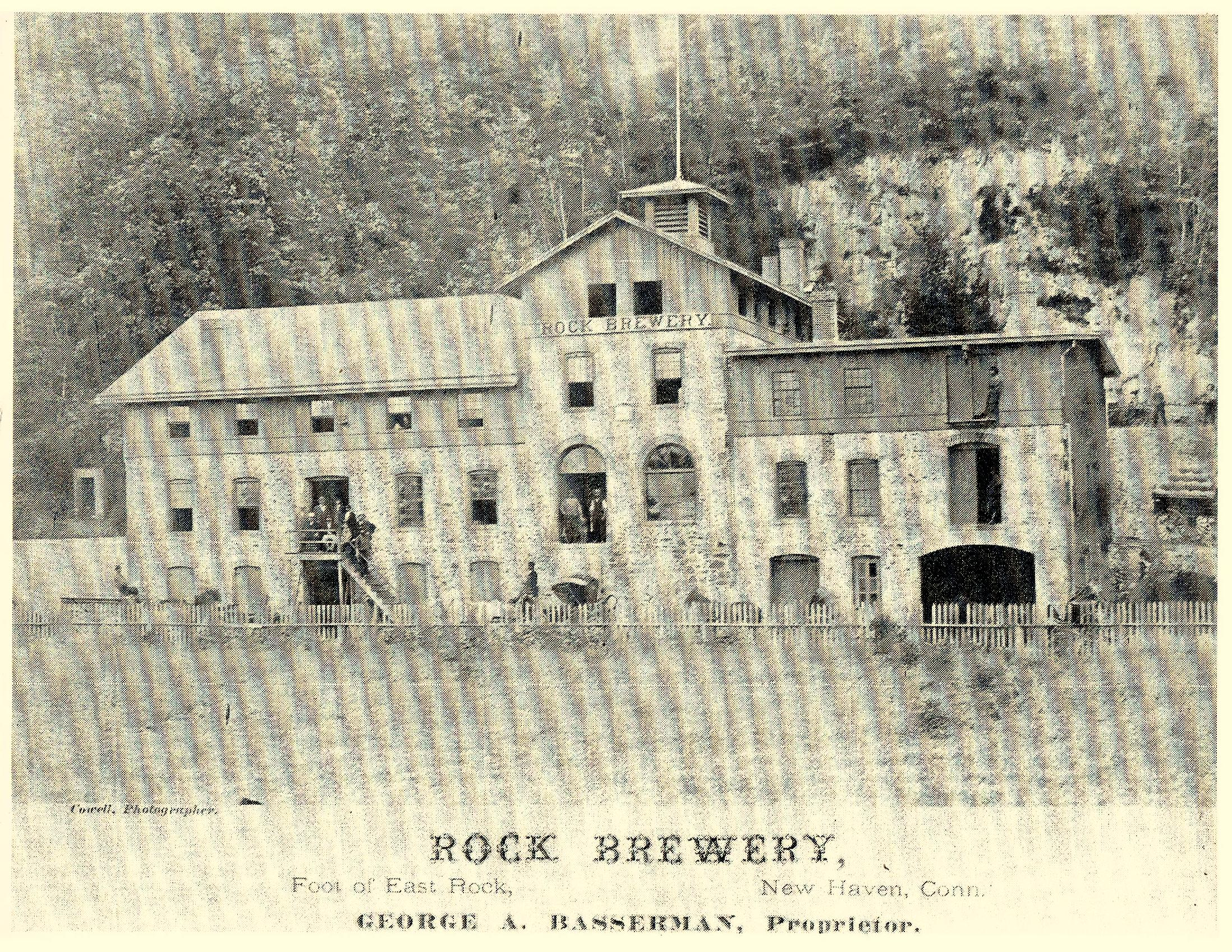
Rock Street Brewery, Cedar Hill, New Haven, CT The Brewery burned down in the 1890s.

George Anton Basserman (4 October 1832 – 27 September 1887) was a brewery owner in the Cedar Hill neighborhood of New Haven, Connecticut during the late 19th century. Born in what is now Germany in 1832, and came to New Haven in 1851.

Basserman was owner of the Rock Brewery on State and Rock St. He blasted a cellar in at the foot of East Rock to start his brewery under which he excavated a cellar, 200 feet deep, 24 feet wide, and 16 feet high, for storing his brewings. The average production of this brewery was from 15,000 to 20,000 barrels a year. Once in business, he made a large bottling plant. The brewery proper comprised a three-story building, partly of stone, 185 by 50 feet in dimensions, while the attached sheds and barns covered an area 688 by 50 feet. It was also remembered for its authentic German beer gardens, built next to the brewery. Although the building was destroyed in a fire, part of the wall remains. Across the street he built a residence for his employees, which was later known as the "George Basserman Building".

1886 The State of Connecticut vs Basserman: A complaint was filed against Basserman for selling "intoxicating" liquors. He was found guilty of selling lager in Hamden, CT without a license.

George Basserman was married to Johannette. They had a son named George Anton Basserman, II. After his father's death, G.A. Basserman II sold the Rock Brewery in 1888 to a John M. Manning of Buffalo, a brother of the late Daniel Manning. He had plans to enlarge it until the fire.

Basserman's granddaughter Anna Basserman married William Hall August 2, 1914. The Hall family still owns several properties in the Cedar Hill community.
