= Frances Rice =

Frances Rice may refer to:

- Frances J. Rice, responsible for the establishment of Old Town Historic District (Huntsville, Alabama)
- Frances Rice, character in Peril at End House (play)
- Frances V. Rice, co-author with Wallace Rice

== See also ==
- Francis Rice (disambiguation)
