= Francis Rice (disambiguation) =

Francis Rice, 5th Baron Dynevor (1804–1878) was a British clergyman and peer.

Francis Rice may also refer to:

- Francis Spring Rice, 4th Baron Monteagle of Brandon (1852–1937), Anglo-Irish peer
- Francis Rice, victim of Shankill Butchers
- Francis Rice, victim of Provisional IRA, see Chronology of Provisional Irish Republican Army actions
- Francis Rice of the 15th, and 16th New Brunswick Legislative Assembly
- Francis Rice, candidate for South Down

== See also ==
- Frank Rice (disambiguation)
- Frances Rice (disambiguation)
