= Lyman Hotchkiss Atwater =

American Presbyterian philosopher

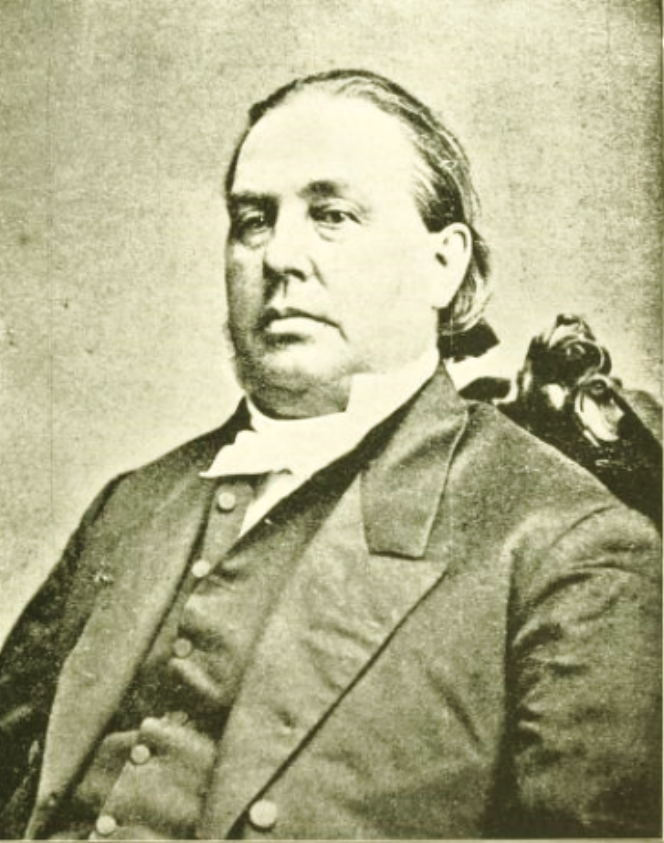
Lyman Hotchkiss Atwater

Lyman Hotchkiss Atwater (February 23, 1813 – February 17, 1883) was an American Presbyterian philosopher.

== Life ==
He was born in Cedar Hill, New Haven, Connecticut. He started going to Yale University at the age of 14 in 1827 and graduated in 1831. He spent some time after graduating as the head of the classical Department of Mount Hope Institute in Baltimore and then entered Yale Divinity School He was then licensed to preach by the Congregational Association of New Haven in May 1834. Then heading on to the First Congregational Church of Fairfield Connecticut. He remained there for 20 years.

He moved on to Princeton in 1854 and started to lecture on religion and metaphysics. And contributed to The Princeton Review. In 1861 he was appointed to the Lectureship Extraordinary in the Theological Seminary at Princeton University. In 1869 he became a professor of logic metaphysics ethics, ethics, economics, and politics and remained with the university. 1871 Yale presented him with the degree of LL.D. From 1876 till his death he was the vice-president of the board of trustees of Princeton Theological Seminary He died in Princeton.

He worked with the Presbyterian Church his whole life and wrote and published articles and one book.

== Family ==
His father was “Major” Lyman Atwater (died March 1862, at Bennington, Vermont). His brothers and sisters were Charles Henry, born September 29, 1808, Grace Clarissa, born April 4, 1814, Susan, born July 14, 1817, and Wyllys, born December 9. 1821. His sister Grace married Elias B. Bishop and bought the family property when the Major moved to Vermont. Lyman being the oldest son would receive the property if had not relocated down to New Jersey.
