= St. John's Episcopal Church (New Haven, Connecticut) =

Episcopal church in New Haven, Connecticut

- St. John's Church in 2026
- St. John's Episcopal Church
- 41°18′58″N 72°55′1″W
- Location: 400 Humphrey Street; New Haven, Connecticut, U.S.
- Denomination: Episcopal Church
- Website: www.stjohnsnewhaven.org

History
- Founded: 1852

Architecture
- Architect: William Halsey Wood

Administration
- Diocese: Diocese of Connecticut

St. John's Episcopal Church is a historic church in the East Rock neighborhood of New Haven, Connecticut. The parish is under the jurisdiction of the Episcopal Diocese of Connecticut.

== History ==
The church was established in 1852. The current building was constructed in 1895 and designed by the architect William Halsey Wood. It is a historic landmark and is listed in the New Haven Preservation Trust's historic resources inventory.

The church is located in the East Rock neighborhood, near Yale University, and has a historic tie to Yale Divinity School and Berkeley Divinity School.
