= English Station =

Abandoned power plant in New Haven, Connecticut

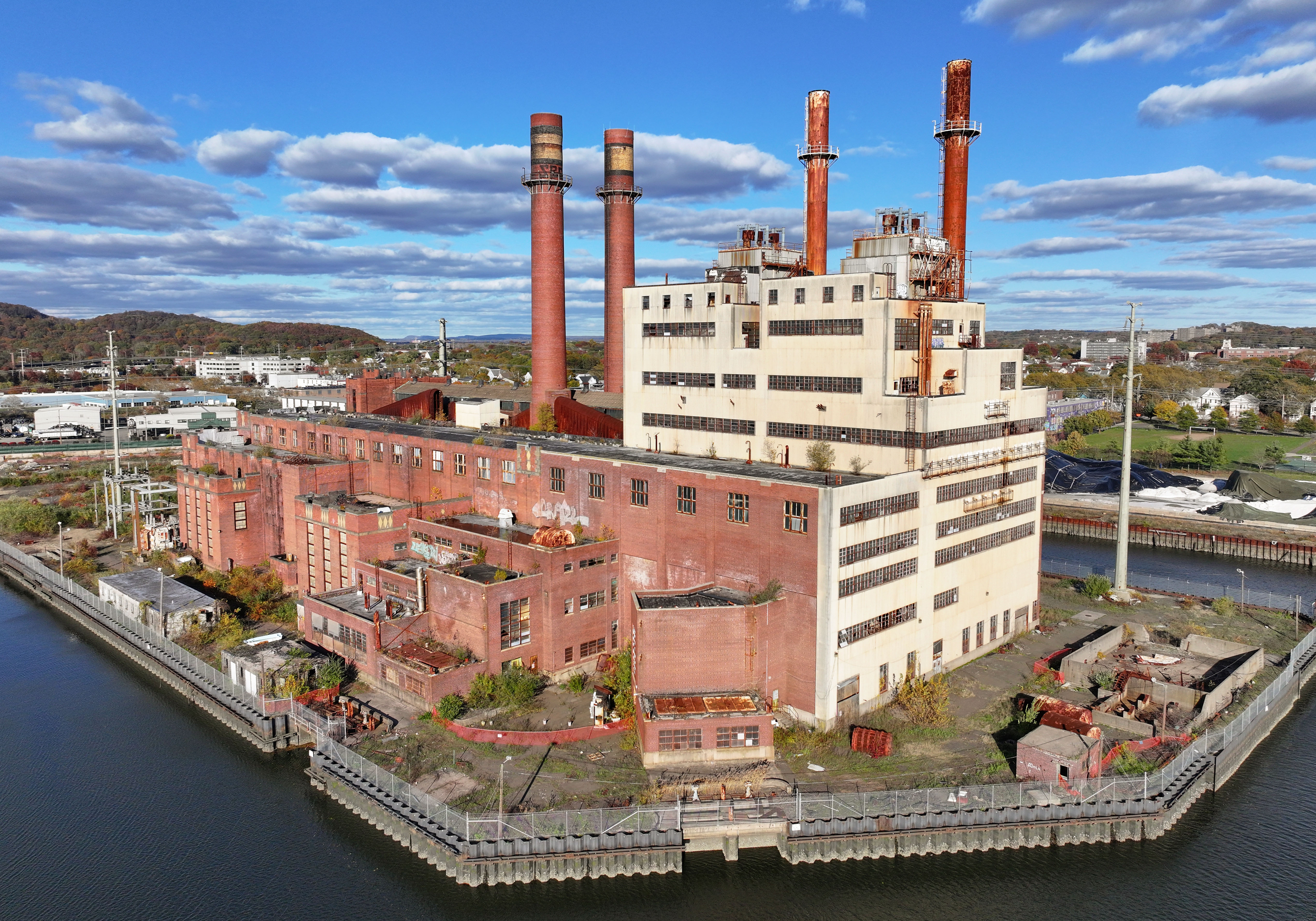
- The abandoned plant in 2025
- Country: United States
- Location: Ball Island, Mill River, New Haven, Connecticut
- Coordinates: 41°18′26″N 72°54′25″W
- Status: Decommissioned
- Commission date: 1929
- Decommission date: 1991–1992
- Owner: United Illuminating (1929–2000)

Thermal power station
- Primary fuel: Fuel oil (coal backup)
- Cooling source: Mill River / New Haven Harbor

Power generation
- Units operational: 14 boilers feeding steam turbine–generators (historical)
- Nameplate capacity: ~200 MW (peak mid-20th century)

English Station is a decommissioned power station on Ball Island in the Mill River in New Haven, Connecticut, United States. Built for the United Illuminating Company, it began operation in 1929 and supplied electricity to the New Haven area until it was shut down in 1991–1992.

Originally coal-fired and later converted to heavy fuel oil, the plant had multiple boilers and turbine units with a peak capacity of about 200 MW, making it one of southern Connecticut’s largest mid-century generating sites. Its ten-story brick and steel powerhouse with twin smokestacks remains a notable Mill River landmark.

The site has remained vacant since deactivation. Environmental officials have documented contamination from asbestos and polychlorinated biphenyls, prompting decades of cleanup orders and litigation involving United Illuminating and the state. In 2025 a Connecticut judge upheld regulatory penalties against the utility for delays in remediation and sent the cleanup standard dispute back to the DEEP for clarification.

The 8.6-acre Ball Island property is now privately owned. The city has proposed purchasing and converting the site into a public waterfront park featuring shoreline access, trails, and a municipal pool.

== See also ==
- List of power stations in Connecticut
