= Soldiers' and Sailors' Monument (New Haven) =

Coordinates: 41.32725°N 72.90462°W

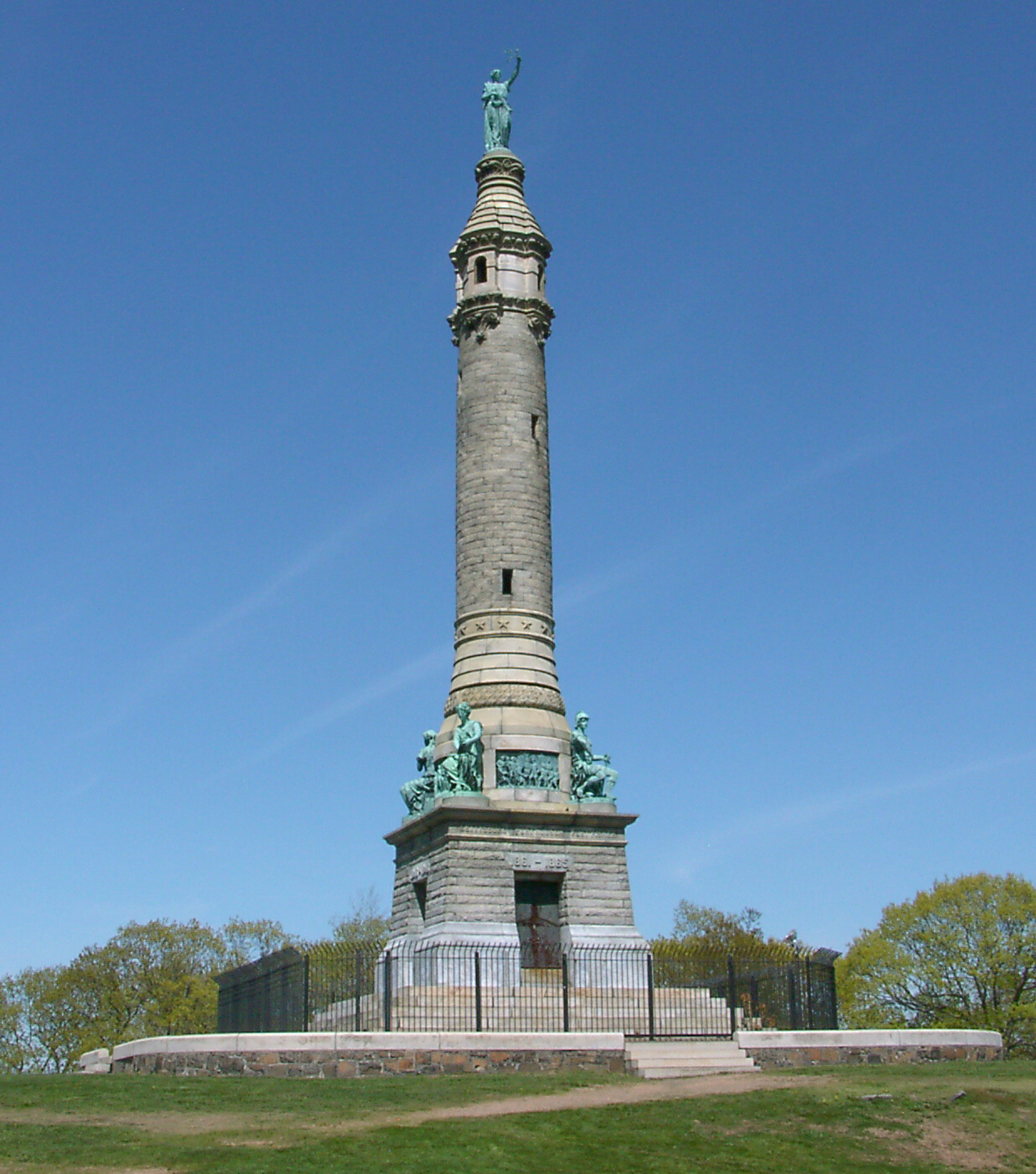
Soldiers and Sailors monument in May 2005

The Soldiers' and Sailors' Monument is a war memorial located on the 366-foot (112 m) summit of East Rock in New Haven, Connecticut. It is visible for miles from the surrounding area and Long Island Sound. The monument was completed in 1887 and honors the residents of New Haven who gave their lives in the Revolutionary War, the War of 1812, the Mexican War, and the Civil War. It is 112 feet (34 m) high and 87 steps to the top.

== History ==
Interest in the monument began as early as 1878, when the New Haven-based Admiral Hull Foote Post of the Grand Army of the Republic began lobbying citizens for a large war memorial in New Haven, and a site on the New Haven Green was dedicated in the following year. A committee and funds for the monument were formed in an 1882 town meeting, but objections about the high number of GAR members in attendance prompted litigation that stalled the project. In 1883, the monument committee advertised a design competition for the monument. At least 15 designs were submitted, including one by Alexander Doyle and John M. Moffit after the deadline. The committee also solicited designs from George Keller and Augustus Saint-Gaudens, who each had designed several well-known Civil War memorials, but both declined to submit proposals. In 1884, the monument's site was moved to East Rock after the city council decided to retain the defunct Connecticut State House, causing further delays.

Two years after the original solicitation, a neoclassical design by Moffit & Doyle was selected, including an observatory, bronze statuary, and red granite shaft. Work was undertaken in 1886 by New Haven firm Smith & Sperry, with the bronze casting completed by the Ames Manufacturing Company and the Decorative Bronze Company. The monument was dedicated on June 17, 1887, with 175,000 people in attendance at the ceremony and parade, including Generals William Tecumseh Sherman and Philip Henry Sheridan as guests of honor.

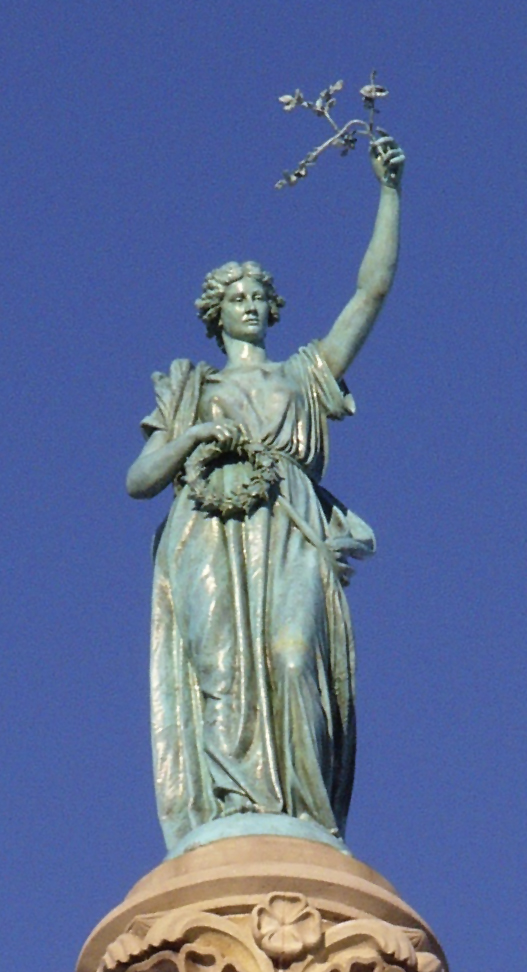
The Angel of Peace statue atop the monument

== Inscriptions ==
The inscriptions on the Soldiers and Sailors monument are as follows:

Southwest face (Civil War battles)

- Gettysburg
- Port Hudson
- Fort Fisher
- 1861-1865

Southeast face (Revolutionary War battles)

- Bunker Hill
- Bennington
- Saratoga
- 1775-1783

Northeast face (War of 1812 battles)

- Lake Erie
- Lake Champlain
- New Orleans
- 1812-1815

Northwest face (Mexican–American War)

- Palo Alto
- Molino Del Rey
- Chapultepec

In addition, the northwest face bears a large plaque with the following inscription: "1861-1865 Soldiers and Sailors of New Haven who died in defense of the Union." This inscription is followed by a three-column casualty list of twelve regiments of infantrymen. The frame of the plaque depicts numbered badges and flags. Some legible names along this border include:

- Fort Donaldson
- Hampton Roads
- Newberne, N.C.
- Fort Pulaski
- James Island
- Island No. 10
- New Orleans
- Fair Oaks
- Secessionville
- Gettysburg
- Dallas
- Bull Run
