= Lake Whitney (Connecticut) =

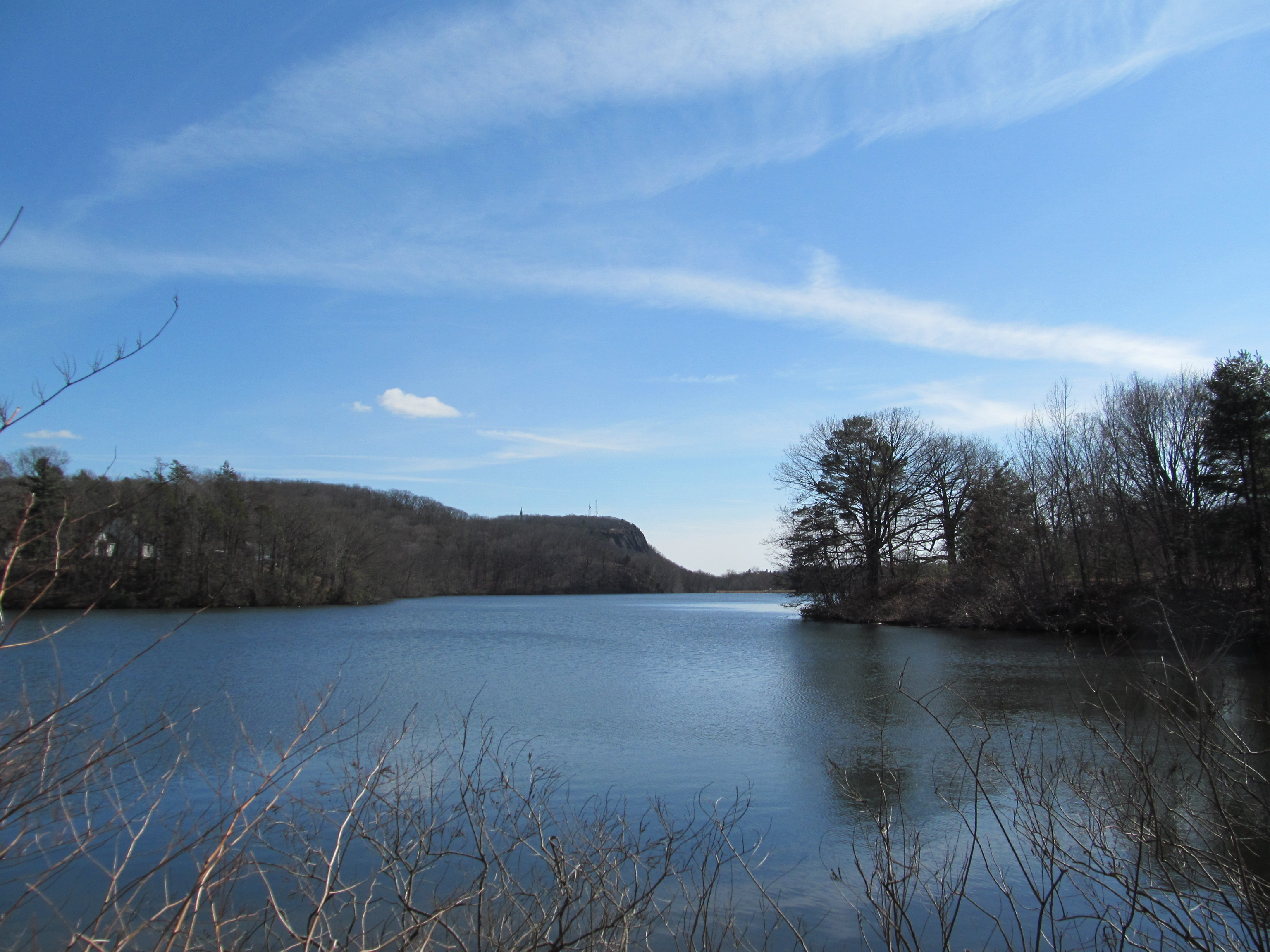
- Lake Whitney

- Location within Connecticut Location within the United States
- Location: Hamden, Connecticut
- Coordinates: 41.352°N 72.911°W
- Type: Reservoir
- Basin countries: United States
- Surface elevation: 33 ft (10 m)

Lake Whitney is a lake in Hamden, Connecticut, that is a part of the Mill River. The lake was a water source for the New Haven, Connecticut, metro area, until its associated treatment plant became antiquated in the 1990s. A new water treatment facility was constructed in the early 2000s rated for up to 15 million gallons per day. Lake Whitney now serves as one of four primary sources of surface water for the RWASouth Central Connecticut Regional Water Authority. RWA also operates a gravity release from the dam when there is no flow over the spillway, and operates an eel pass in conjunction with CT DEEP to assist with eel migration over the dam.
