= Battle of James Island =

1782 battle in the American Revolution

- Part of the American Revolutionary War
Date	November 14, 1782
Location	James Island, South Carolina
Result	British victory

Belligerents
United States	Great Britain

Commanders and leaders
Tadeusz Kościuszko	William Dansey

Strength
70	300+

Casualties and losses
5 killed 5 wounded	2 killed 3 wounded

The Battle of James Island was a minor engagement on November 14, 1782, just outside Charleston, South Carolina, between American and British forces. British troops were on the move attempting to evacuate. In an effort to encourage the British evacuation, American forces led by Tadeusz Kościuszko attempted to ambush British troops under William Dansey who were cutting wood; however, reinforcements were quickly brought to the British side and Kościuszko's soldiers, numbering 70 men, were forced to retreat.

The British, after receiving reinforcements, numbered more than 300 soldiers and vastly outnumbered the Americans. Several Americans were killed, including Captain William Wilmont, the last Continental Army soldier killed in action in the Carolinas. In addition to Wilmont, William Smith, a Black slave who assisted American troops during the battle, was taken captive by Dansey's forces and subsequently died in captivity. As the skirmish finished, the remaining American troops retreated. The British would soon withdraw from the region, marking the end of the American Revolutionary War.
