= Frank J. Rice =

American politician

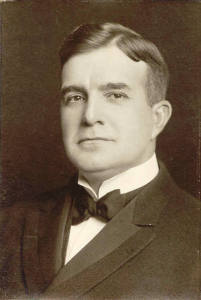
Mayor Frank J. Rice 1869 – 1917

Rice Field, Cedar Hill, New Haven Ct Named after Frank J. Rice Former Mayor of New Haven

Frank J. Rice (February 5, 1869, North Adams, Massachusetts – 1917) was a four-term Republican mayor of New Haven, Connecticut.. At 18 he went into the grocery business. And a few years after became the superintendent of H.P. Ives & Company. He was voted in as mayor in 1909, winning the race by 402 votes. He was a former member of the New Haven Councilmen. At one time in his life he was a trolley conductor in New Haven. He died midway through the first year of his fourth term as mayor.

His wife was Charlotte A. Watrous, a native of Clinton, CT. He had two children: Russel L., born July 8, 1894, and Mancel W.

He was a member of The Masons, the Odd Fellows, Elks, Red Men, Heptasophs, the Eagles, the Woodmen of the World, the Knights of Pythias, the Aryan Grotto and the Haru Gari. Mayor Rice also supported scouting and was a founding member of the boy Scouts of America in 1910 (Headquarters in New Haven, CT).

By 1915 Mayor Rice set up playgrounds across the city. He mainly focused on tenement districts and said that the cost was one cent per child per hour of play.

A baseball field named Rice Field in Cedar Hill was named after the mayor. In 1921, land along View Street in Cedar Hill was filled in for Rice Field.

When Adm. Richard E. Byrd visited New Haven in 1947, he spoke before the people of New Haven at Rice Field.

== See also ==
- Scouting in Connecticut
