= East Rock =

Rock ridge in Connecticut, US

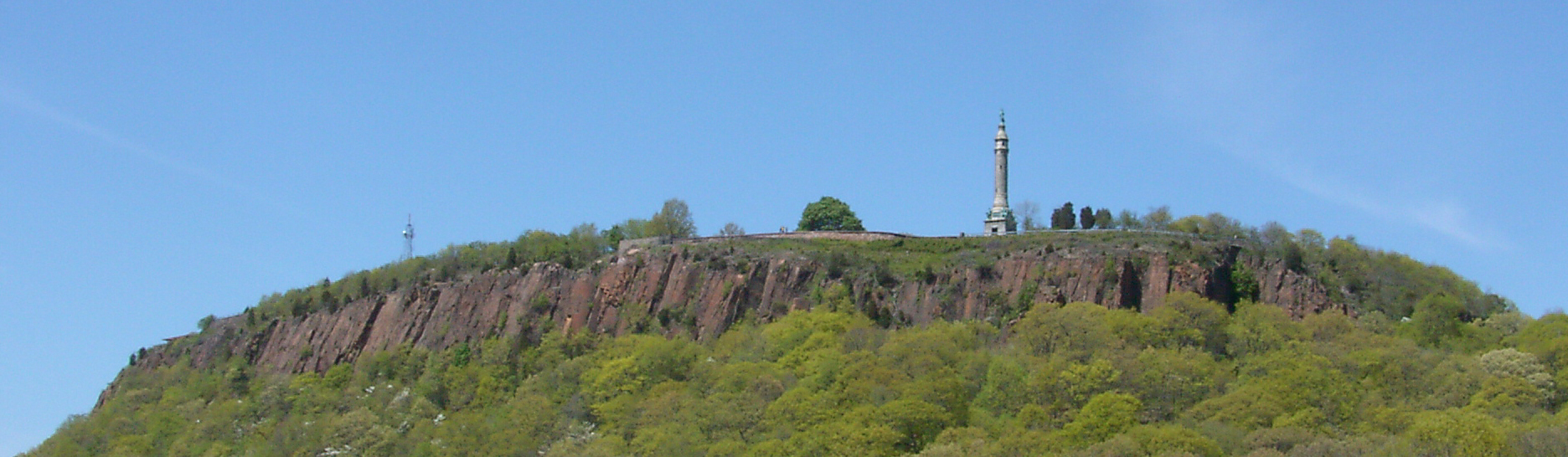
- East Rock

Highest point
- Elevation: 366 ft (112 m)
- Coordinates: 41°19′38″N 72°54′17″W

Geography
- Location: New Haven, Hamden
- Parent range: Metacomet Ridge

Geology
- Rock age: 200 Ma
- Mountain type(s): Fault-block; igneous

Climbing
- Easiest route: Auto road

East Rock of south-central Connecticut, United States, with a high point of 366 feet (112 m), is a 1.4-mile (2 km) long trap rock ridge located primarily in the neighborhood of East Rock on the north side of the city of New Haven. A prominent landscape feature and a popular outdoor recreation area with cliffs that rise 300 feet (91 m) over the city below, East Rock is part of the narrow, linear Metacomet Ridge that extends from Long Island Sound near New Haven, north through the Connecticut River Valley of Massachusetts to the Vermont border. East Rock is the central feature of East Rock Park, a municipal park owned by the city of New Haven along the New Haven-Hamden town line.

== Geography ==
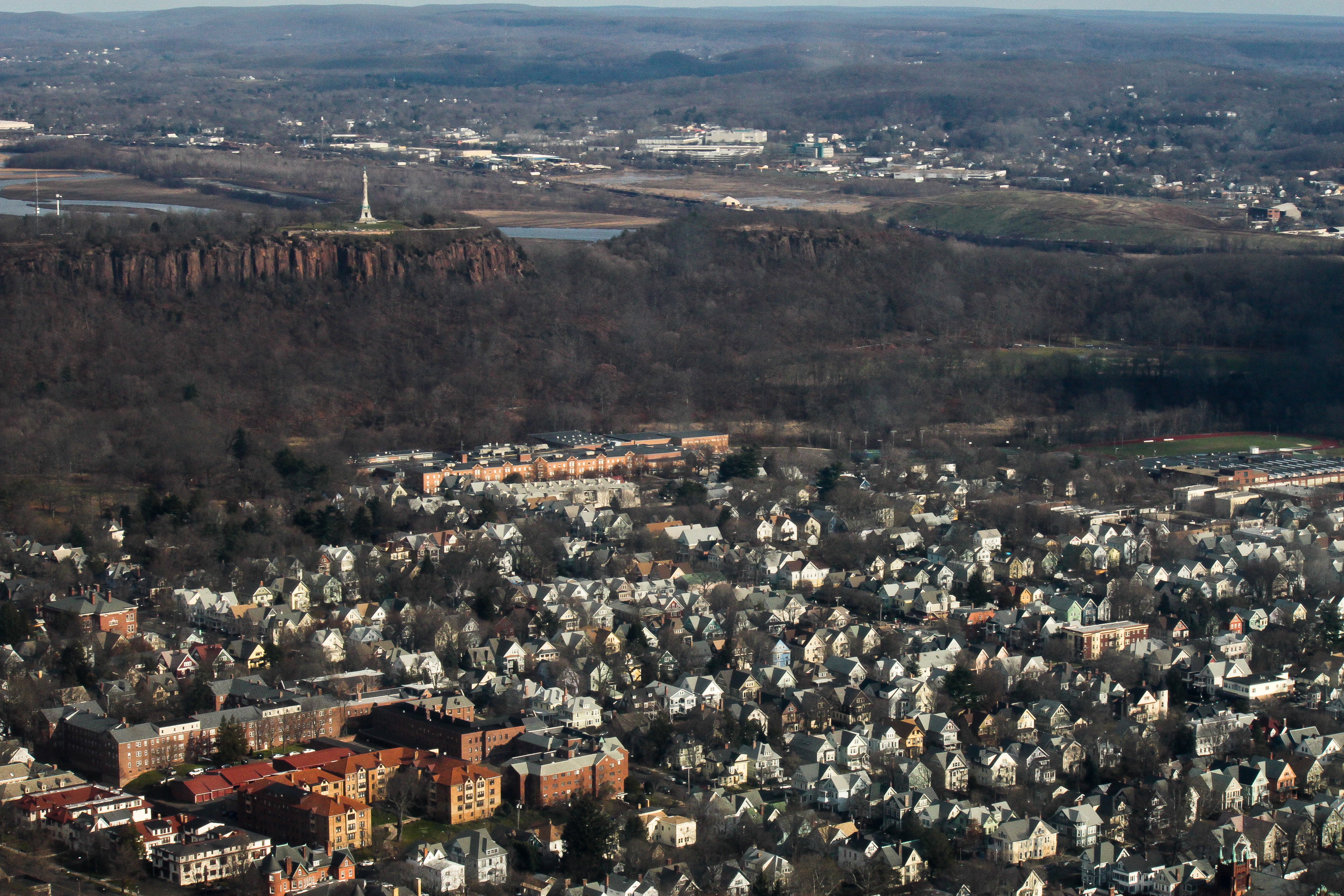
East Rock with its eponymous neighborhood below

East Rock, located in New Haven and Hamden, Connecticut, is 1.4 miles (2.3 km) long by 0.5 miles (800 m) wide at its widest point, although steepness of the terrain make the actual land area much larger. Beside the high point, East Rock has three other distinct peaks: Whitney Peak, 300 feet (91 m), a sharp-sided pinnacle on the north side of the ridge; Indian Head, 310 feet (94 m), just south of the high point; and Snake Rock, 205 feet (62 m), the southern buttress of the ridge.

Whitney Peak and Lake Whitney (located at the western base of the mountain behind the dammed Mill River) are named after Eli Whitney, the inventor of the cotton gin and a former New Haven resident. The Eli Whitney Museum, a museum and workshop with hands-on projects and exhibits on Eli Whitney and A. C. Gilbert, is located at the base of the dam.

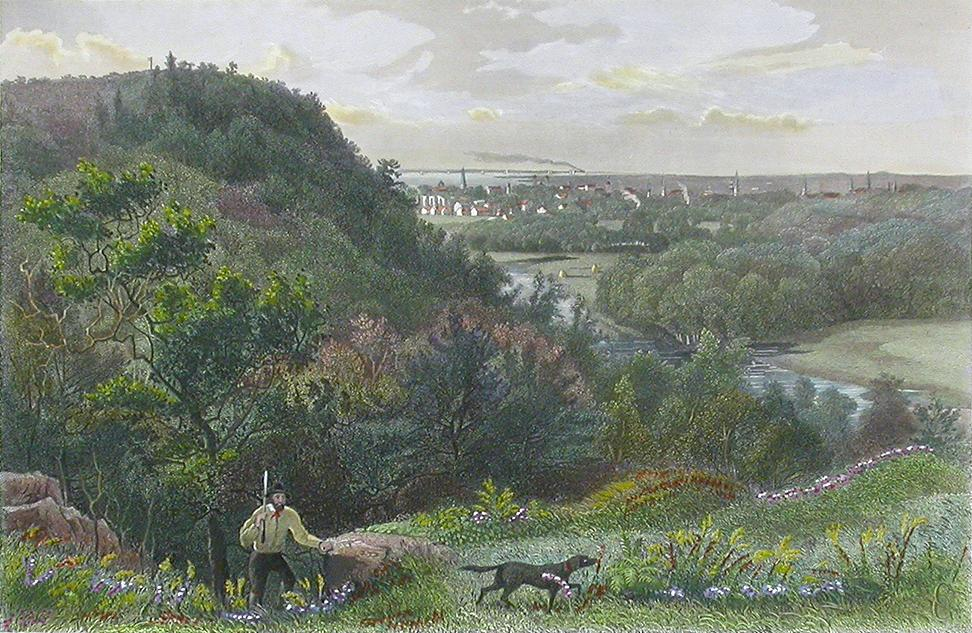
East Rock, New Haven, an 1872 engraving showing the Mill River, with New Haven in the distance

On the summit of East Rock, clearly visible miles away, is the 112-foot (34 m) Soldiers and Sailors Monument. The monument honors the residents of New Haven who gave their lives in the American Revolutionary War, the War of 1812, the Mexican War, and the Civil War.

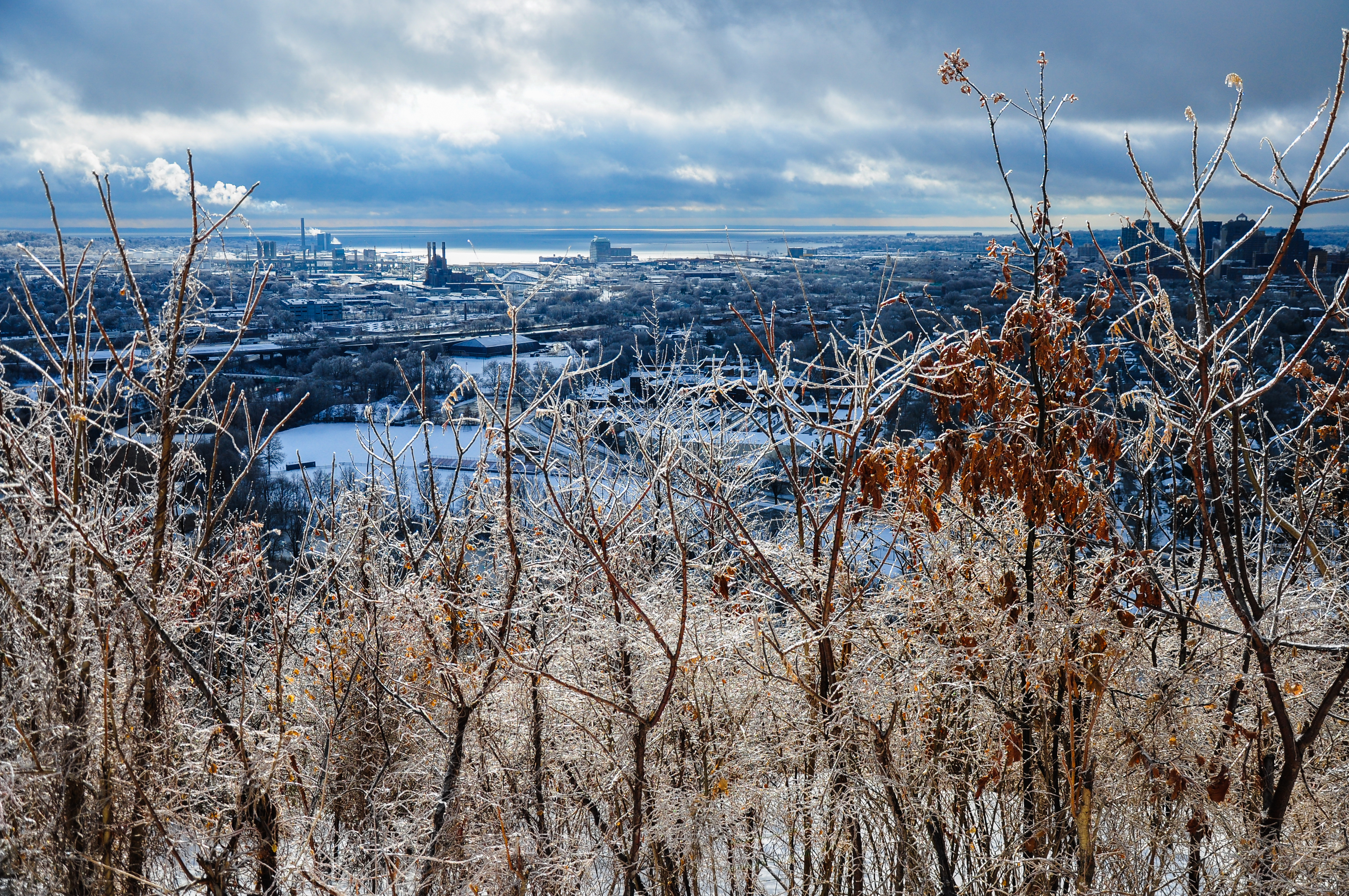
View south from East Rock in winter.

East Rock is located entirely within the 425-acre (172 ha) East Rock Park, managed by the city of New Haven, which maintains a seasonal automobile road that climbs to the summit of the ridge, a network of trails, an environmental center, and a rose garden. A number of recreation facilities are located at the southwest base of the ridge; these are also managed by the city. The ridge is completely surrounded by the urban neighborhoods of New Haven and its metropolitan extension into south Hamden. East Rock lends its name to the nearby upscale East Rock neighborhood of New Haven, known for its Queen Anne and Victorian architecture. U.S. Route 5 borders the east side of East Rock while Interstate 91 crosses below Snake Rock to the south.

The Metacomet Ridge extends west from East Rock as series of smaller, unnoteworthy traprock outcrops to West Rock Ridge; it extends east over another series of traprock outcrops to Saltonstall Mountain and Peter's Rock. The west side of East Rock drains into the Mill River thence to New Haven Harbor and Long Island Sound; the east side into the Quinnipiac River, thence to New Haven Harbor and Long Island Sound. Both rivers abut the base of the mountain.

== Geology ==
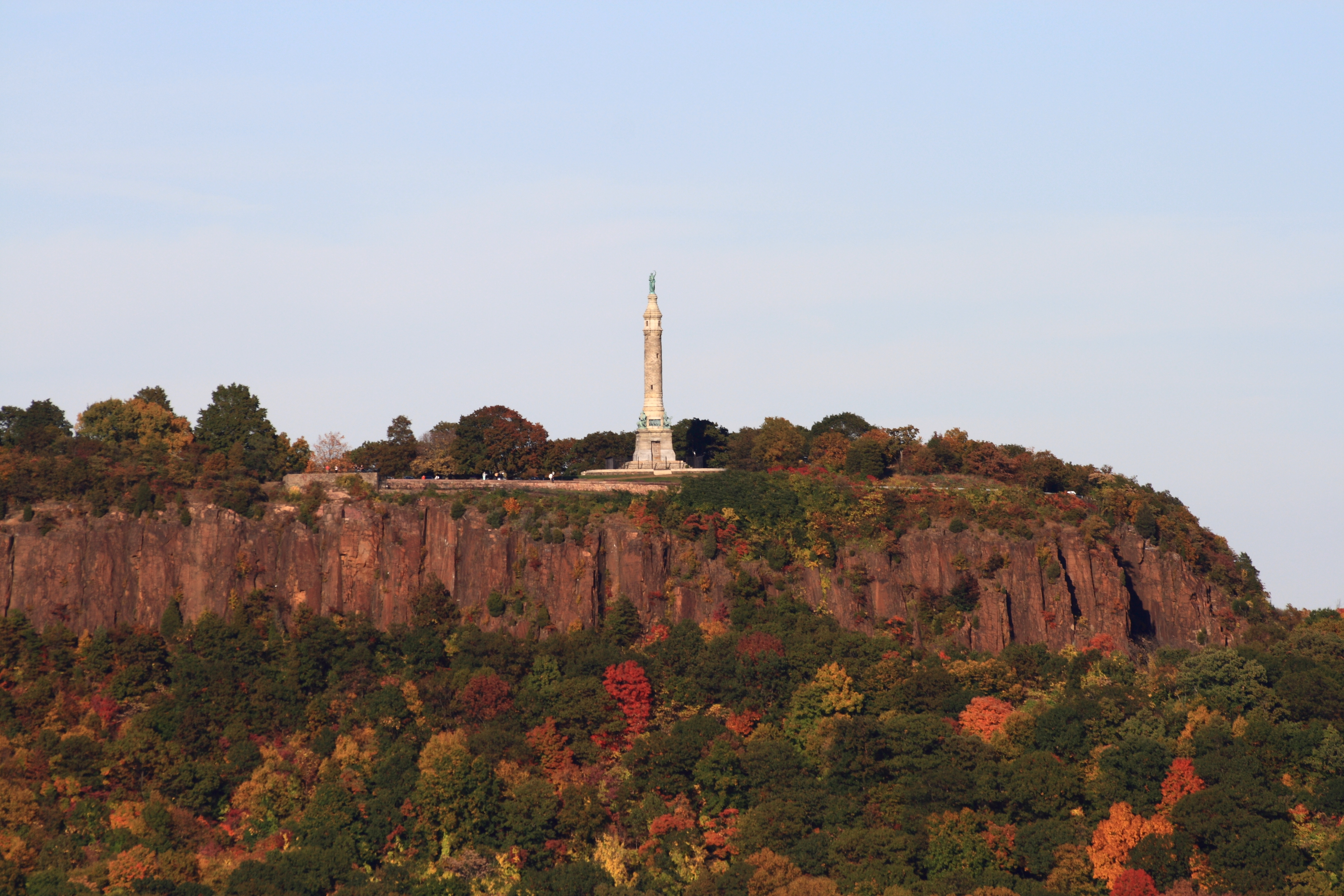
The trap rock cliffs of East Rock

East Rock is a fault-block ridge formed 200 million years ago during the Triassic and Jurassic periods and is composed of trap rock, known as basalt, if extrusive, or diabase, if intrusive. East Rock, being intrusive, is diabase. Diabase is a dark colored rock, but the iron within it weathers to a rusty brown when exposed to the air, lending the ledges a distinct reddish appearance. Diabase frequently breaks into octagonal and pentagonal columns, creating a unique "postpile" appearance. Huge slopes made of fractured diabase scree are visible beneath many of the ledges of East Rock. These diabase cliffs are the product of lava intrusions hundreds of feet deep that welled up through faults creating sills during the rifting apart of North America from Eurasia and Africa over a period of 20 million years. Erosion and glacial abrasion over the subsequent 200 million years wore away the weaker sedimentary layers, under which the sill had intruded, at a faster rate than the diabase, leaving the abruptly tilted edges of the diabase sheets exposed, creating the distinct linear ridge and dramatic cliff faces visible today.

== Ecosystem ==
East Rock hosts a combination of microclimates unusual in New England. Dry, hot upper ridges support oak savannas, often dominated by chestnut oak and a variety of understory grasses and ferns. Eastern red cedar, a dry-loving species, clings to the barren edges of cliffs. Cooler north facing backslopes tend to support extensive stands of eastern hemlock interspersed with the oak-hickory forest species more common in the surrounding lowlands. Narrow ravines crowded with hemlock block sunlight, creating damp, cooler growing conditions with associated cooler climate plant species. Talus slopes are especially rich in nutrients and support a number of calcium-loving plants uncommon in eastern Connecticut.

East Rock is also an important seasonal raptor migration path.

== Recreation ==
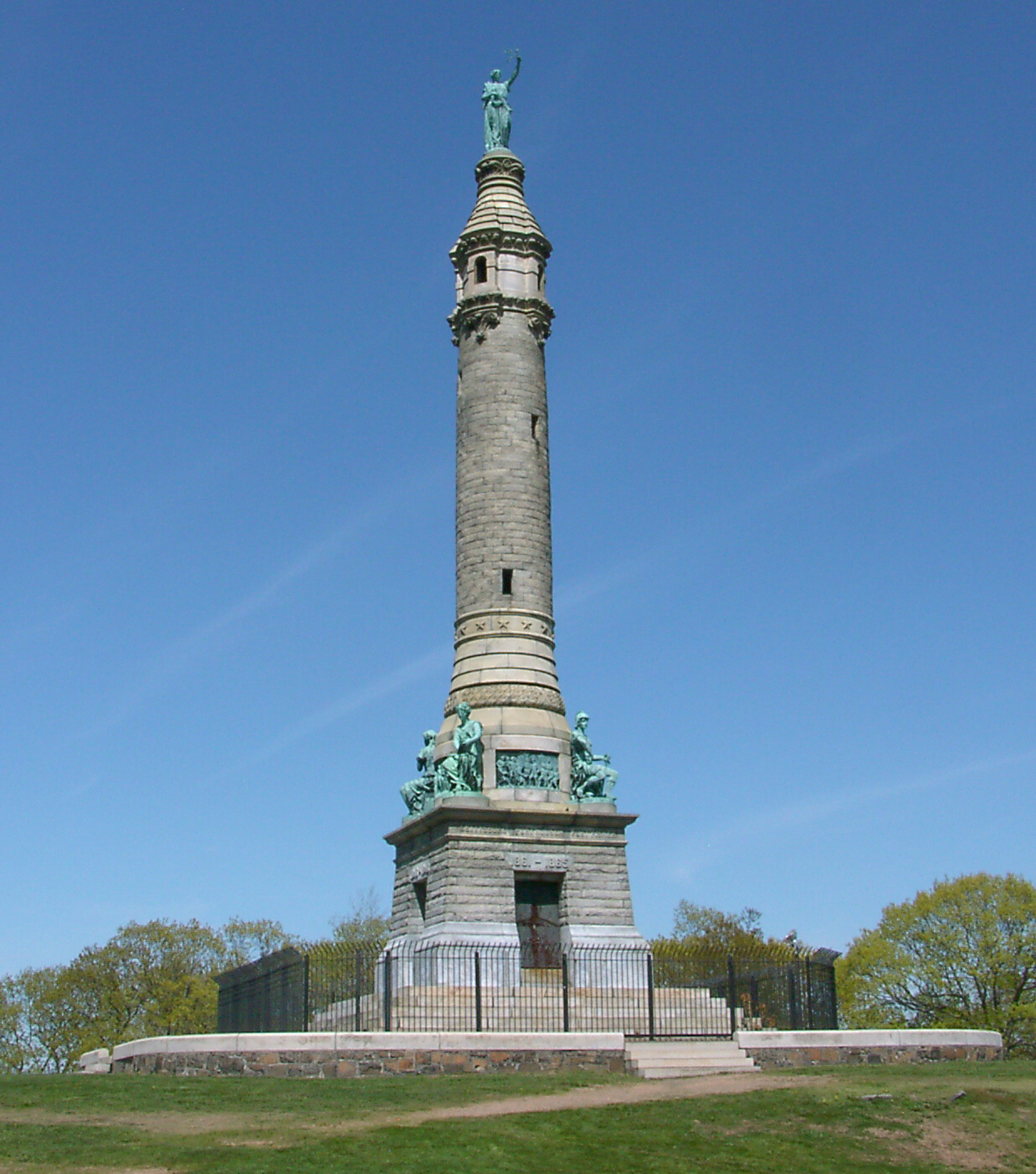
Soldiers and Sailors Monument

East Rock is a popular outdoor recreation destination among residents and visitors of the greater New Haven region. Views from the clifftops span metropolitan New Haven, Long Island Sound, and Long Island.

East Rock Park is open year-round to hikers and walkers. The automobile road is open April 1 to November 1, 8 a.m. to sunset and November 1 to March 31, Friday, Saturday, Sunday, and holidays, 8 a.m. to 4 p.m., weather permitting. Activities permitted in the park include hiking, snowshoeing, cross-country skiing, picnicking, bicycling (on roads and city-designated mountain bike trails only), boating (on the Mill River), bird watching, and dog walking. Rock climbing, swimming, and alcoholic beverages are prohibited. A number of hiking trails traverse the ridge, most notably the Giant Steps Trail which ascends to the summit at a near-vertical pitch from the south. At the foot of the mountain are located football, baseball, and soccer fields, tennis courts, basketball courts, and playgrounds. The Trowbridge Environmental Center is open Thursdays and Fridays from 10:00 am to 5:00 pm, and at least one Saturday a month for public programs; it offers displays and information about the geology and ecosystem of East Rock. The Pardee Rose Garden and Greenhouse features roses and other flowering plants from spring to fall, and is a popular place to shoot wedding pictures.

The naturalist landscaping and other aspects of the park led to its being listed on the National Register of Historic Places in 1997.

== See also ==
- East Rock (neighborhood)
- Adjacent summits:

< West

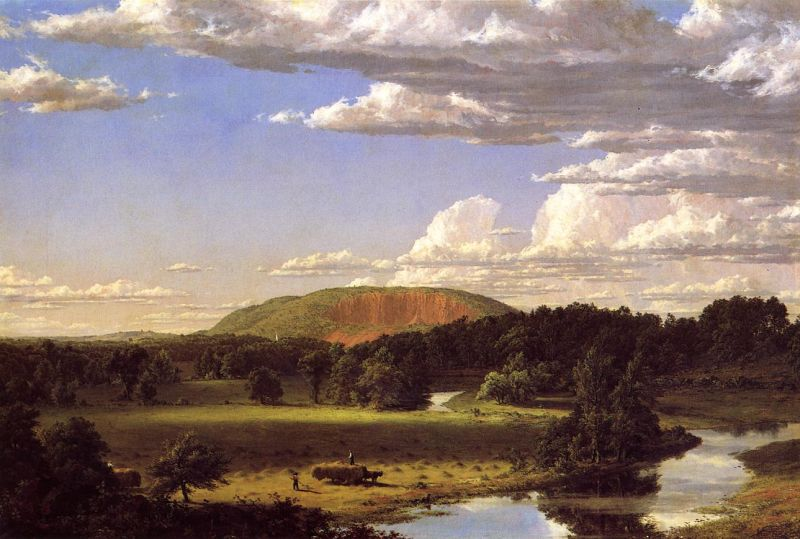
West Rock Ridge

East >

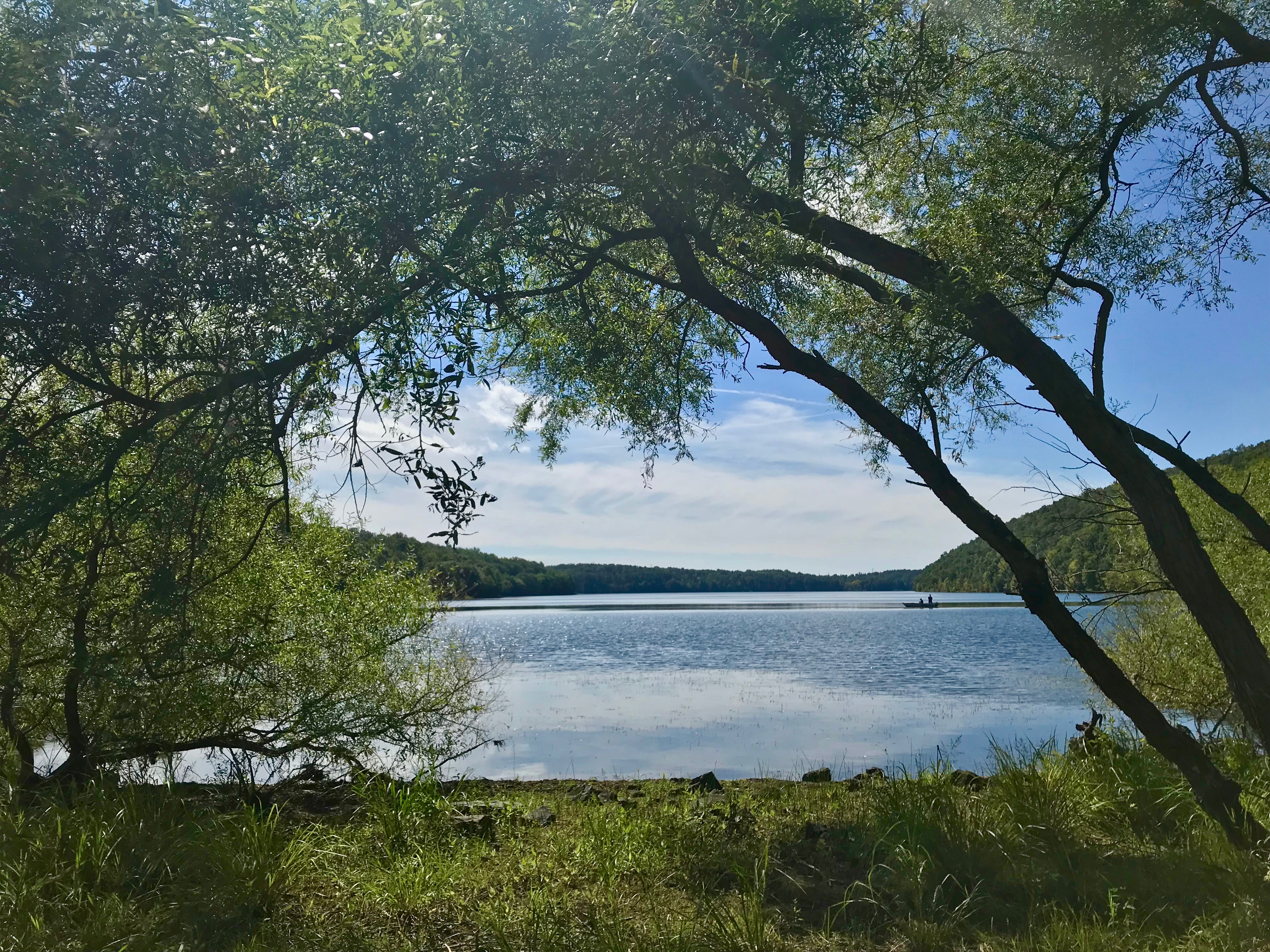
Saltonstall Mountain

East >

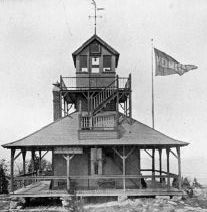
Peter's Rock
