= Mill River (Connecticut) =

River in New Haven County, Connecticut, United States

Coordinates: 41°25′15″N 72°54′12″W

The Mill River is a river in New Haven County, Connecticut, United States.

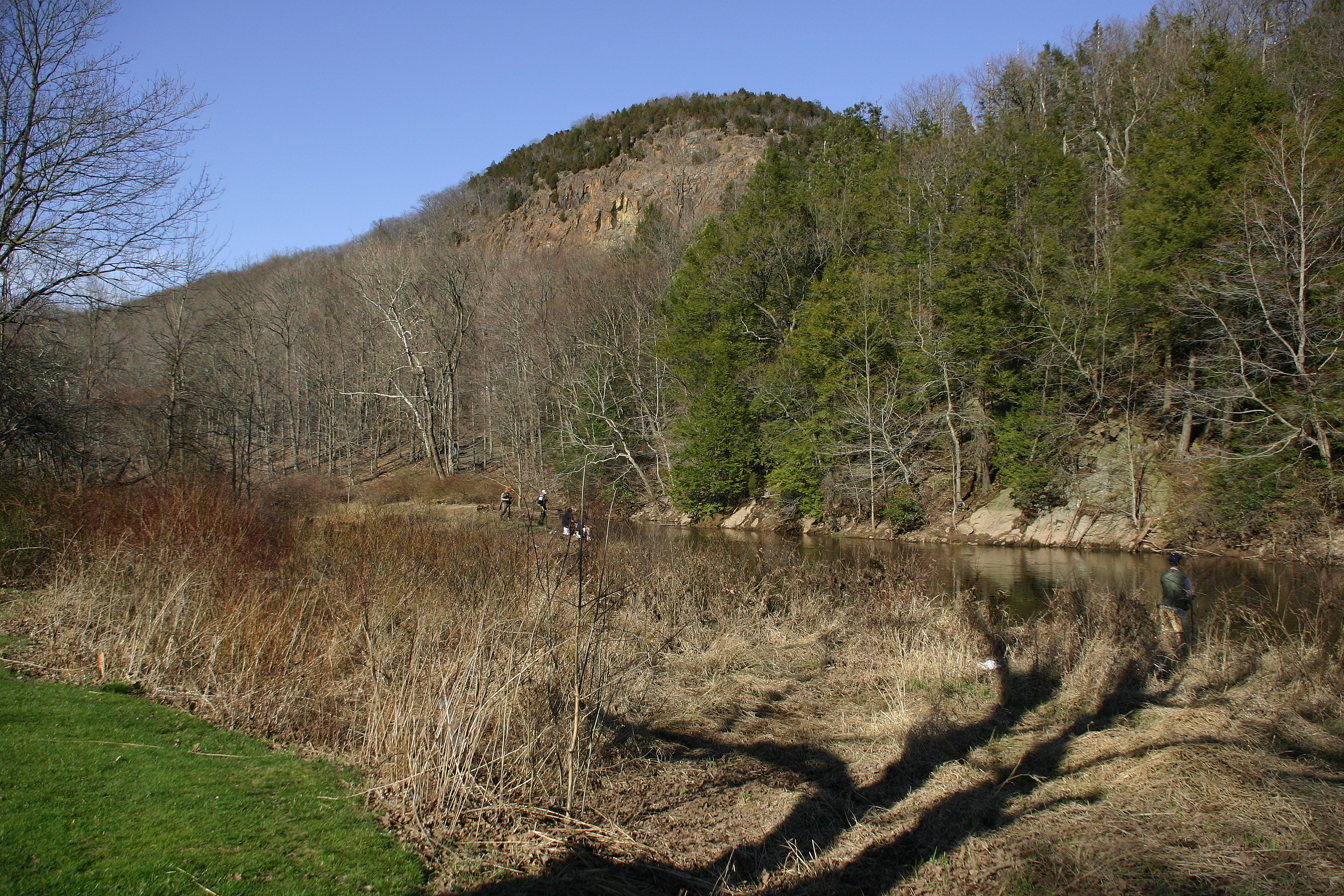
Mill River, Hamden, Connecticut. Sleeping Giant Mountain in background.

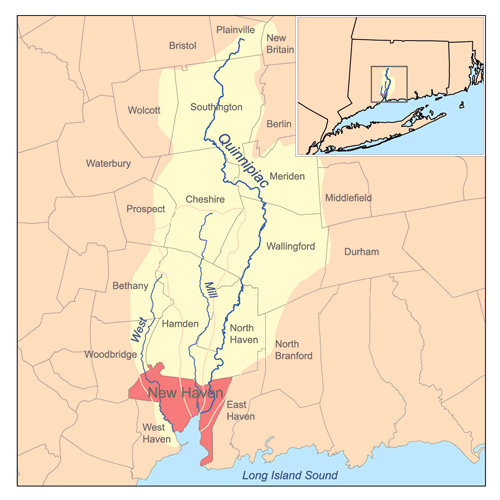
Map showing the Mill River and other rivers draining to New Haven Harbor, with their combined watersheds.

== History ==
A mill for grinding corn was built on a Quinnipiack ford near East Rock in 1642. By 1780 there were eight mills. In time the river provided power for Eli Whitney's gun factory, now the Eli Whitney Museum. It joins the Quinnipiac River at the mouth of New Haven Harbor which opens out into Long Island Sound.

== Watershed and course ==
The river starts in the town of Cheshire, flows through Hamden and New Haven, and discharges into New Haven Harbor on Long Island Sound. The upper portion of the river is formed from eastern and western branches, the latter of which is sometimes called Willow Brook. The river's length is 17.4 miles (28.0 km). The river is dammed in southern Hamden to form Lake Whitney, which is operated as a reservoir by the South Central Connecticut Regional Water Authority.

Mill River passes through Sleeping Giant State Park in northern Hamden and East Rock Park below Lake Whitney in Hamden. These are among the river's reaches that remain undeveloped and are popular spots for fishing and hiking.

The USGS has maintained a gauge (01196620) near Sleeping Giant for the past 41 year to continuously monitor flow. Real time data are available here.

A trail is under development that follows the course of the river, especially in the city of New Haven.

The lower portion of the river is a fresh tidal system because of the existence of tide gates that cyclically block flow near State Street in New Haven. This section of the river is the subject of research to determine how sediments, metals, and other substances cycle through the estuary.

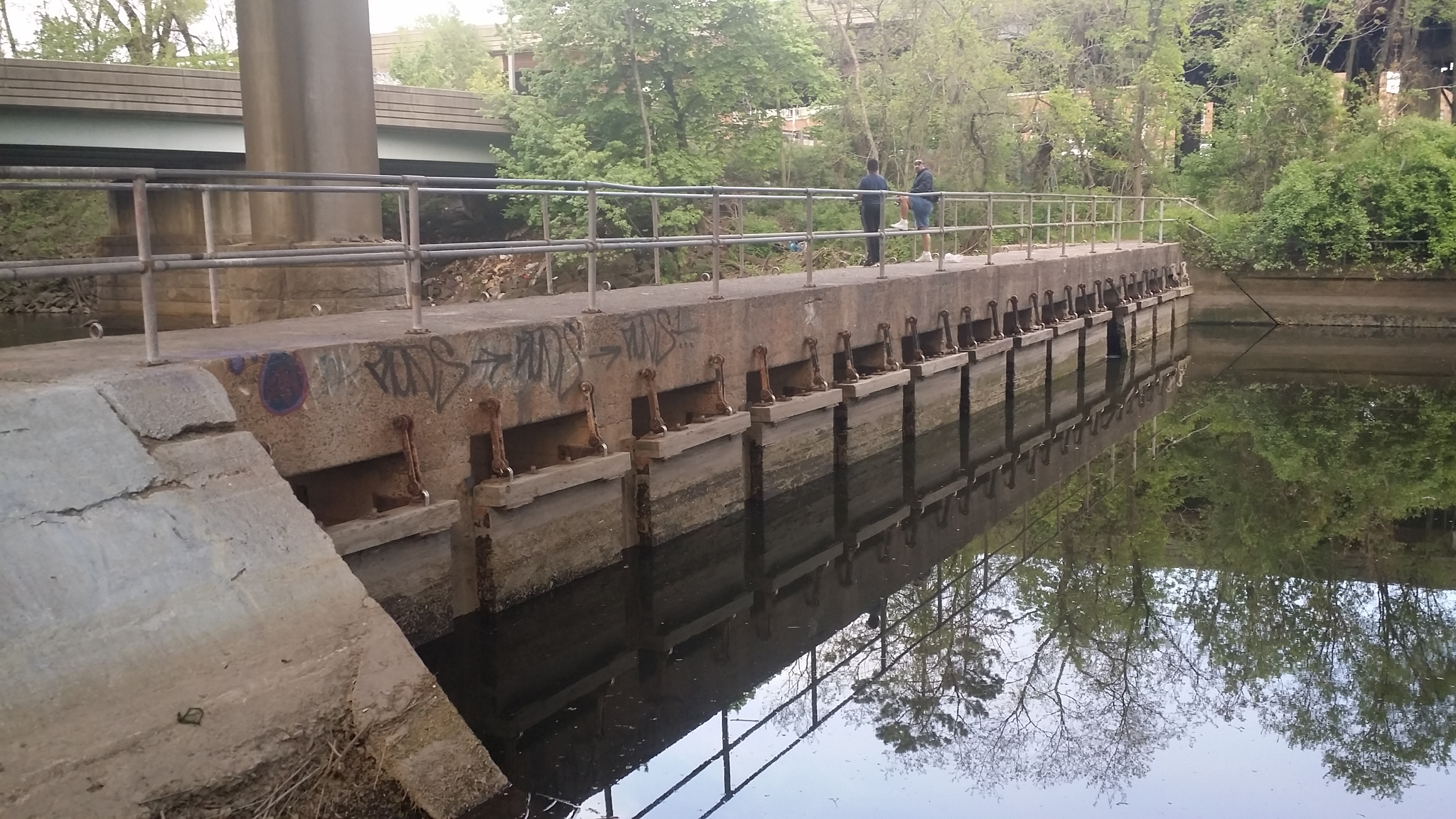
The Mill River tide gates near State Street, New Haven, at slack tide.

English Station, an abandoned power plant, lies on Ball Island in the New Haven terminus of the river. There has been a study of PAHs in this section of the river.

== Ecology and conservation ==
In 2018 a plan for protecting and restoring the Mill River Watershed was developed through collaboration between Save the Sound and Connecticut DEEP.

The river and its watershed are stewarded by a volunteer group, the Mill River Watershed Association.

In July 2020, 2.1 million gallons of raw sewage spilled into the Mill River when a corroded sewage pipe broke. Within a week the broken pipe was replaced and city officials announced water samples from the river showed safe levels of bacteria.

== See also ==
- List of rivers of Connecticut
