= South Mountain (New Haven County, Connecticut) =

Mountain in Connecticut, United States

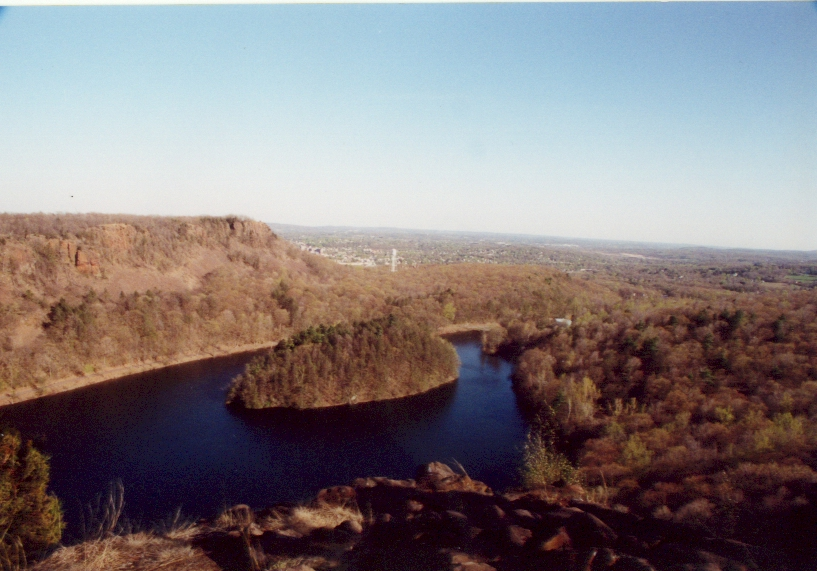
- Ledges of South Mountain from East Peak. Merimere Reservoir and Mine Island in foreground

Highest point
- Elevation: 767 ft (234 m)
- Parent peak: 41° 33' 16"N, 72° 49' 25"W
- Coordinates: 41°33′16″N 72°49′25″W

Geography
- Location: Meriden and Berlin, Connecticut
- Parent range: Hanging Hills / Metacomet Ridge

Geology
- Rock age: 200 million yrs.
- Mountain type(s): fault-block; igneous

Climbing
- Easiest route: No official trail

South Mountain, 767 ft (234 m), is a prominent traprock peak in the Hanging Hills of Meriden, Connecticut. Rugged and scenic, the peak rises steeply above the city of Meriden 400 ft (122 m) below and is characterized by its vertical cliffs and sweeping views of southern Connecticut and Long Island Sound.

Most of South Mountain is located within the 1,800-acre (7.3 km^{2}) Hubbard Park. The 51-mile (82 km) Metacomet Trail crosses the wooded backside of South Mountain, but no official trail leads to the southern cliff face. Activities enjoyed on the mountain include hiking, and in the winter, snowshoeing and backcountry skiing.

== See also ==
- Metacomet Ridge
- Adjacent summits:

< East

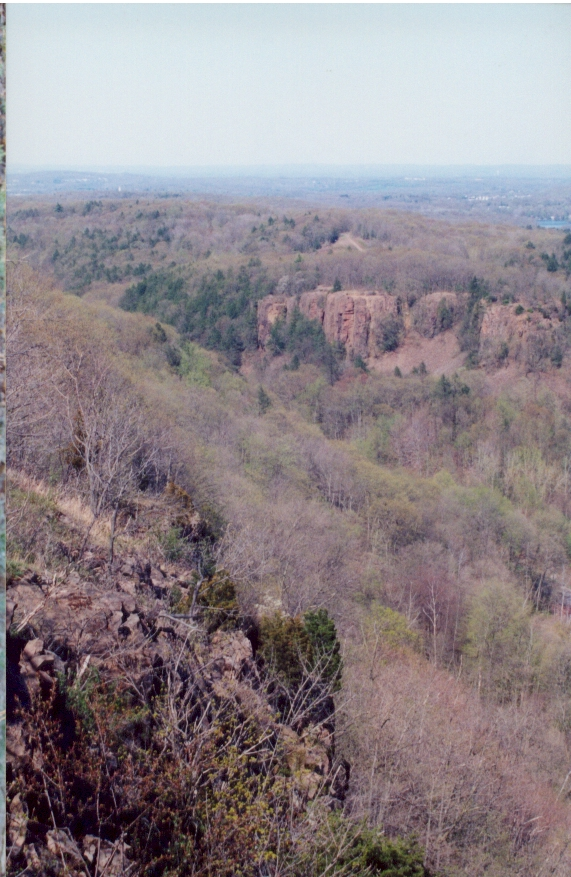
Cathole Mountain

West >

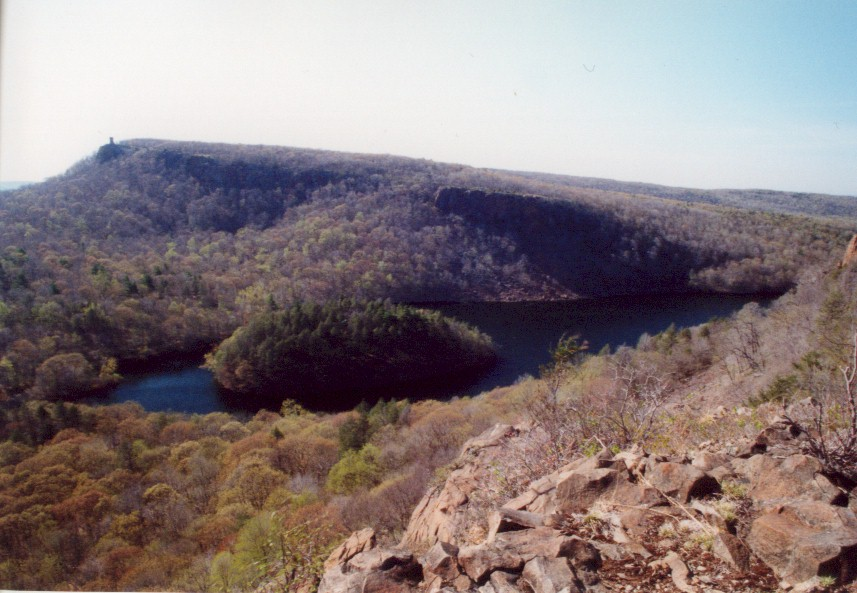
East Peak
