= Metacomet Trail =

Hiking trail in Connecticut, United States

Coordinates: 41°46′34″N 72°47′56″W

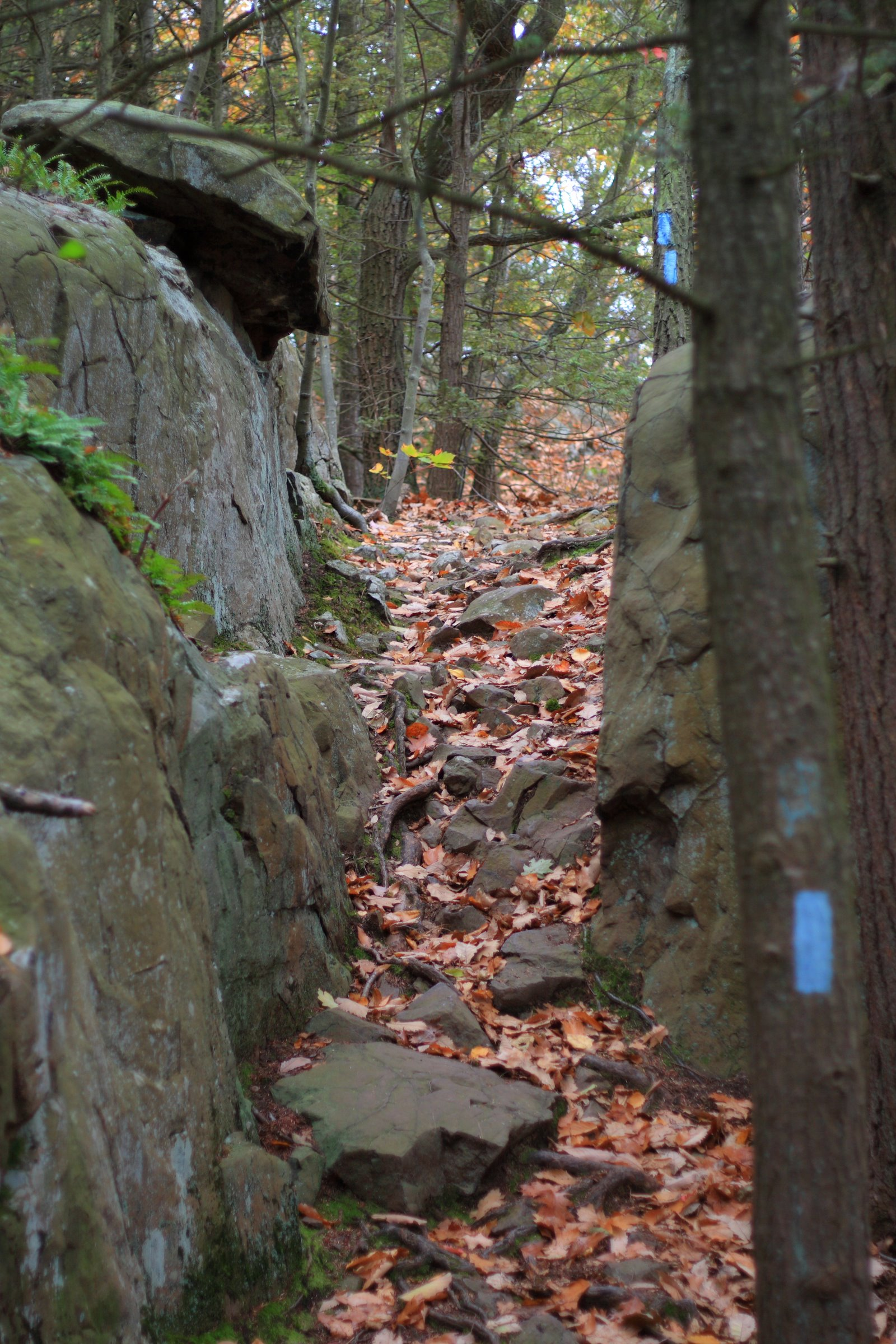
- Blue-blazes mark the Metacomet Trail
- Length: 51 mi (82 km)
- Location: Hartford County / New Haven County, Connecticut, USA
- Designation: Part of a National Scenic Trail
- Use: hiking, snowshoeing, other
- Highest point: West Peak, 1,024 ft (312 m)
- Lowest point: Farmington River, 150 ft (46 m)
- Difficulty: easy, with difficult sections
- Season: easiest spring to fall
- Hazards: deer ticks, poison ivy, copperheads (in places)

The Metacomet Trail is a 62.7-mile (100.9 km) Blue-Blazed hiking trail that traverses the Metacomet Ridge of central Connecticut as part of the New England National Scenic Trail. Despite being easily accessible and close to large population centers, the trail is considered remarkably rugged and scenic. The route includes many areas of unique ecologic, historic, and geologic interest. Notable features include waterfalls, dramatic cliff faces, woodlands, swamps, lakes, river flood plain, farmland, significant historic sites, and the summits of Talcott Mountain and the Hanging Hills. The Metacomet Trail is maintained largely through the efforts of the Connecticut Forest and Park Association.

On March 30, 2009, President Barack Obama signed the Omnibus Public Land Management Act of 2009 establishing the New England National Scenic Trail (and two other national scenic trails).

The combination of the Metacomet, Monadnock and Mattabesett trails is also often referred to as the 3-M, MMM or Metacomet-Monadnock-Mattabesett trail. The New England National Scenic Trail includes all or almost all of the MMM trails as well as the new extension trail from the southernmost point on the Mattabesett Trail through Guilford, Connecticut to the northern shore of Long Island Sound.

== Trail description ==
The Metacomet Trail extends from the Connecticut/ Massachusetts border south through Hartford and northern New Haven counties in Connecticut. The southern terminus of the trail is located just east of the Hanging Hills on U.S. Route 5, 4 miles (6 km) north of the city of Meriden, in the town of Berlin, Connecticut. The northern terminus is located in the hamlet of Rising Corner, part of Suffield, Connecticut, 7 miles (11 km) southwest of Springfield, Massachusetts. The 110-mile (180 km) Metacomet-Monadnock Trail in Massachusetts and the Monadnock-Sunapee Greenway in New Hampshire continue the footway north from the Metacomet Trail another 160 miles (260 km) to central New Hampshire. The 50-mile (80 km) Mattabesett Trail picks up where the Metacomet Trail leaves off in Berlin and continues south to Totoket Mountain then northeast to the Connecticut River in Middletown.

Significant networks of shorter hiking trails intersect the Metacomet Trail, most notably on Talcott Mountain, the Hanging Hills, and Ragged Mountain.

The Metacomet Trail is primarily used for hiking, backpacking, picnicking, and in the winter, snowshoeing. Portions of the trail are suitable for, and are used for, mountain biking and cross-country skiing. Site-specific activities enjoyed along the route include hunting, fishing, horseback riding, boating, bouldering, rock climbing (access), and swimming.

=== Trail route ===
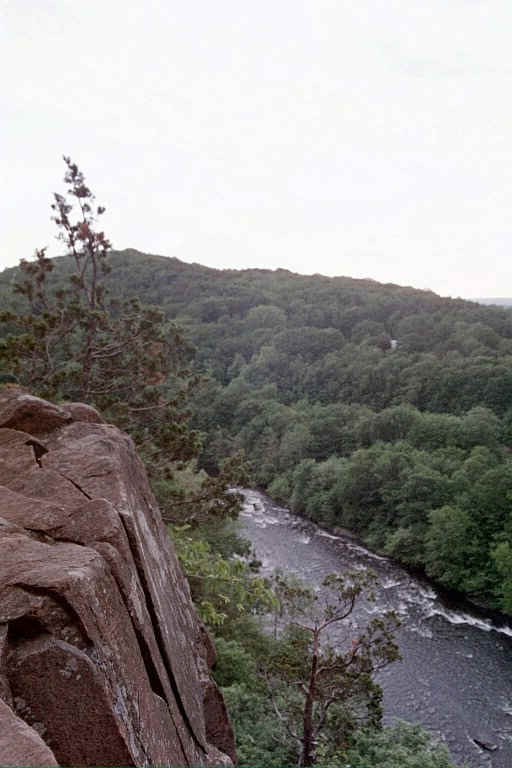
Tariffville Gorge from Hatchet Hill

The Metacomet Trail traverses the trap rock Metacomet Ridge which extends from Long Island Sound to the Massachusetts/ Vermont border. This ridge, rising hundreds of feet above the Connecticut River, Farmington River, and Quinnipiac River valleys, is a prominent landscape feature of central Connecticut. From south to north, the trail uses the ridges of the Hanging Hills, Short Mountain, Ragged Mountain, Bradley Mountain, Pinnacle Rock, Rattlesnake Mountain, Farmington Mountain, Talcott Mountain, Hatchet Hill, Peak Mountain, and West Suffield Mountain. Abrupt vertical cliffs with visible talus slopes and frequent viewpoints are common throughout. Views are generally to the west from West Suffield Mountain south through Ragged Mountain; with views in all directions at varying points in the Hanging Hills. The Farmington River cuts through the ridgeline between Hatchet Hill and Talcott Mountain in the Tariffville Gorge (east of Simsbury). Historic features along the trail include Old Newgate Prison museum and copper mine in East Granby; Heublein Tower on Talcott Mountain with expansive view of four states; the Hill-Stead museum in Farmington, Connecticut, notable for its French impressionist painting collection and gardens; and Hubbard Park of the Hanging Hills of Meriden, designed with the help of famous landscape architect Frederick Law Olmsted and crowned with a small observation tower known as Castle Craig. The trap rock ridges and talus slopes of the Metacomet Ridge are also home to several unique microclimate ecosystems that support species of plants that are unusual or endangered in this part of New England, and are a seasonal migration path for raptors. Viewshed from the ledges include agrarian land, suburbs, small towns, river corridors, the eastern Berkshires ridgeline, and metropolitan Meriden and Hartford.

=== Trail communities ===
The Metacomet Trail passes through land located within the following incorporated towns, from south to north: Berlin, Meriden, Southington, New Britain, Plainville, Farmington, West Hartford, Avon, Bloomfield, Simsbury, East Granby, and Suffield, Connecticut

== Landscape, geology, and natural environment ==
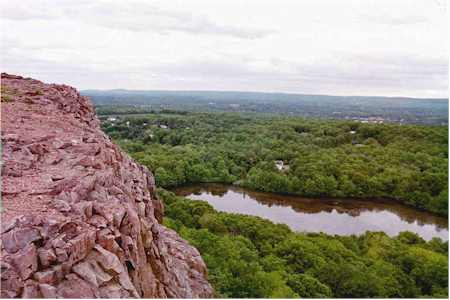
Ragged Mountain summit

The Metacomet Ridge that forms the spine of the Metacomet Trail was formed 200 million years ago during the late Triassic and early Jurassic periods, and is composed of trap rock, also known as basalt, an extrusive volcanic rock. Basalt is a dark colored rock, but the iron within it weathers to a rusty brown when exposed to the air, lending the ledges a distinct reddish appearance. Basalt frequently breaks into octagonal and pentagonal columns, creating a unique "postpile" appearance. Huge slopes made of fractured basalt scree are visible beneath many of the cliffs along the Metacomet Trail. The Metacomet Ridge was the product of several massive lava flows hundreds of feet deep that welled up in faults created by the rifting apart of North America from Eurasia and Africa. The basalt floods of lava occurred over a period of 20 million years. Erosion occurring between the eruptions deposited deep layers of sediment between the lava flows, which eventually lithified into sedimentary rock.

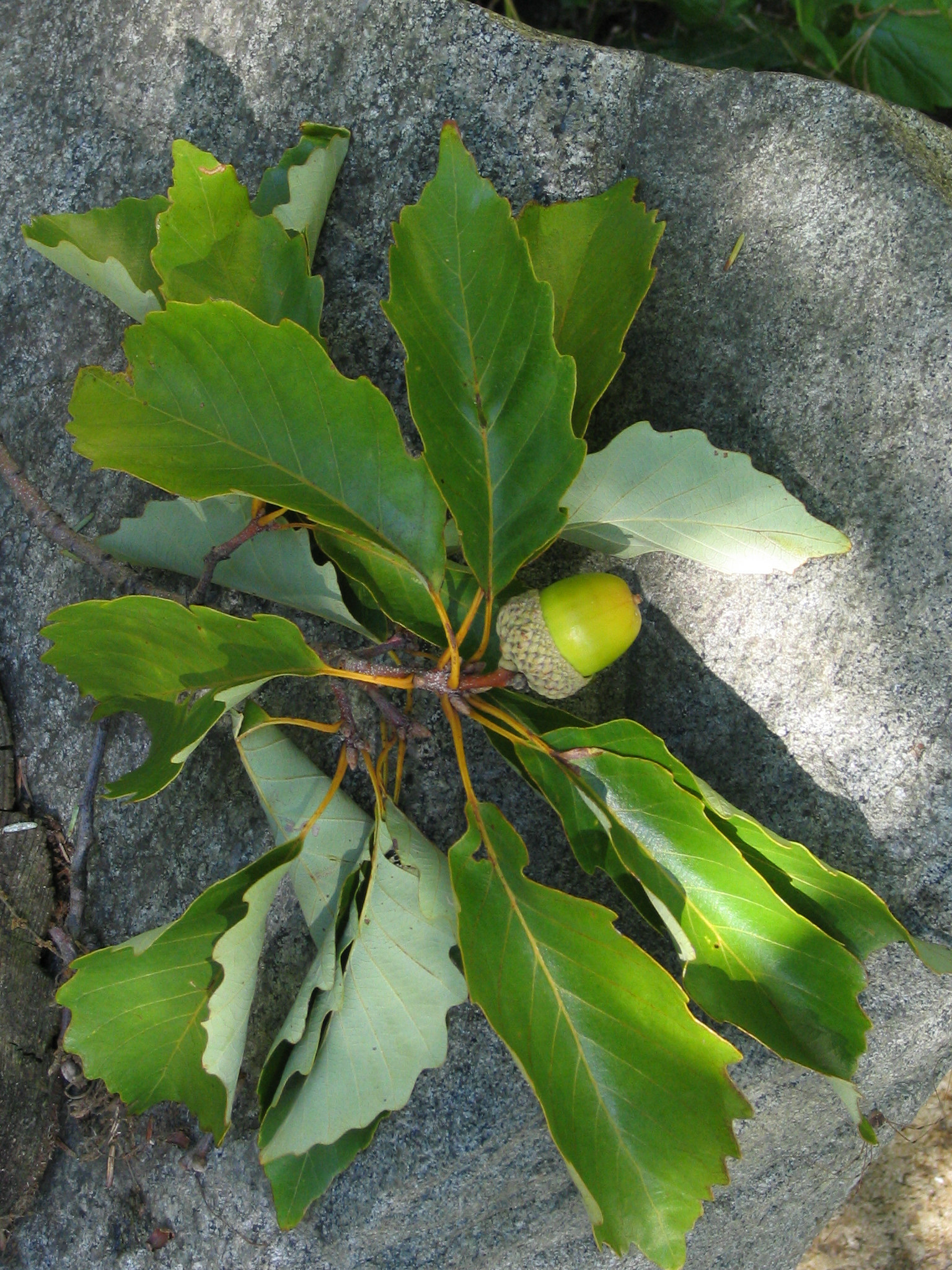
Chestnut Oak

The resulting "layer cake" of basalt and sedimentary sheets eventually faulted and tilted upward. Subsequent erosion wore away the weaker sedimentary layers a faster rate than the basalt layers, leaving the abruptly tilted edges of the basalt sheets exposed, creating the distinct linear ridge and dramatic cliff faces visible today. The best way to imagine this is to picture a layer cake tilted slightly up with some of the frosting (the sedimentary layer) removed in between. The sedimentary rock of the Metacomet ridge is well known for its fossils, especially dinosaur tracks.

The Metacomet Ridge hosts a combination of microclimates unusual in New England. Dry, hot upper ridges support oak savannas, often dominated by chestnut oak and a variety of understory grasses and ferns. Eastern red cedar, a dry-loving species, clings to the barren edges of cliffs. Prickly pear cactus has been recorded on the south-facing slopes of Ragged Mountain. Backslope plant communities tend to be more similar to the adjacent upland plateaus containing species common to the northern hardwood and oak-hickory forest types. Eastern hemlock crowds narrow ravines, blocking sunlight and creating damp, cooler growing conditions with associated cooler climate plant species. Talus slopes are especially rich in nutrients and support a number of calcium-loving plants uncommon in Massachusetts. Many bogs, ponds, and reservoirs lie cupped between trap rock ridge shelves, demonstrating the value of these ridges as important aquifers and wetland ecosystem habitats. Because the Metacomet Ridge generates such varied terrain, it is the home of several plant and animal species that are state-listed or globally rare. The Traprock Wilderness Recovery Strategy (1991) was an early attempt to protect the ridges from sprawl. It received the Connecticut Governor's Green Circle Award yet was ignored by authorities in Southington, Berlin, New Britain, and Meriden. Since then, sprawl has eroded the ecological integrity of the trail corridor, particularly in Southington. That said, Southington has acquired the Crescent Lake compartment, yet now has plans to log it (2014) without regard for the ecological sensitivity of the area.

Other ecosystems on the southern sections of the Metacomet Trail include the northern riverine community which supports species such as willow, American elm, and sycamore; this ecosystem can be found along the Westfield and Connecticut Rivers.

== History and folklore ==
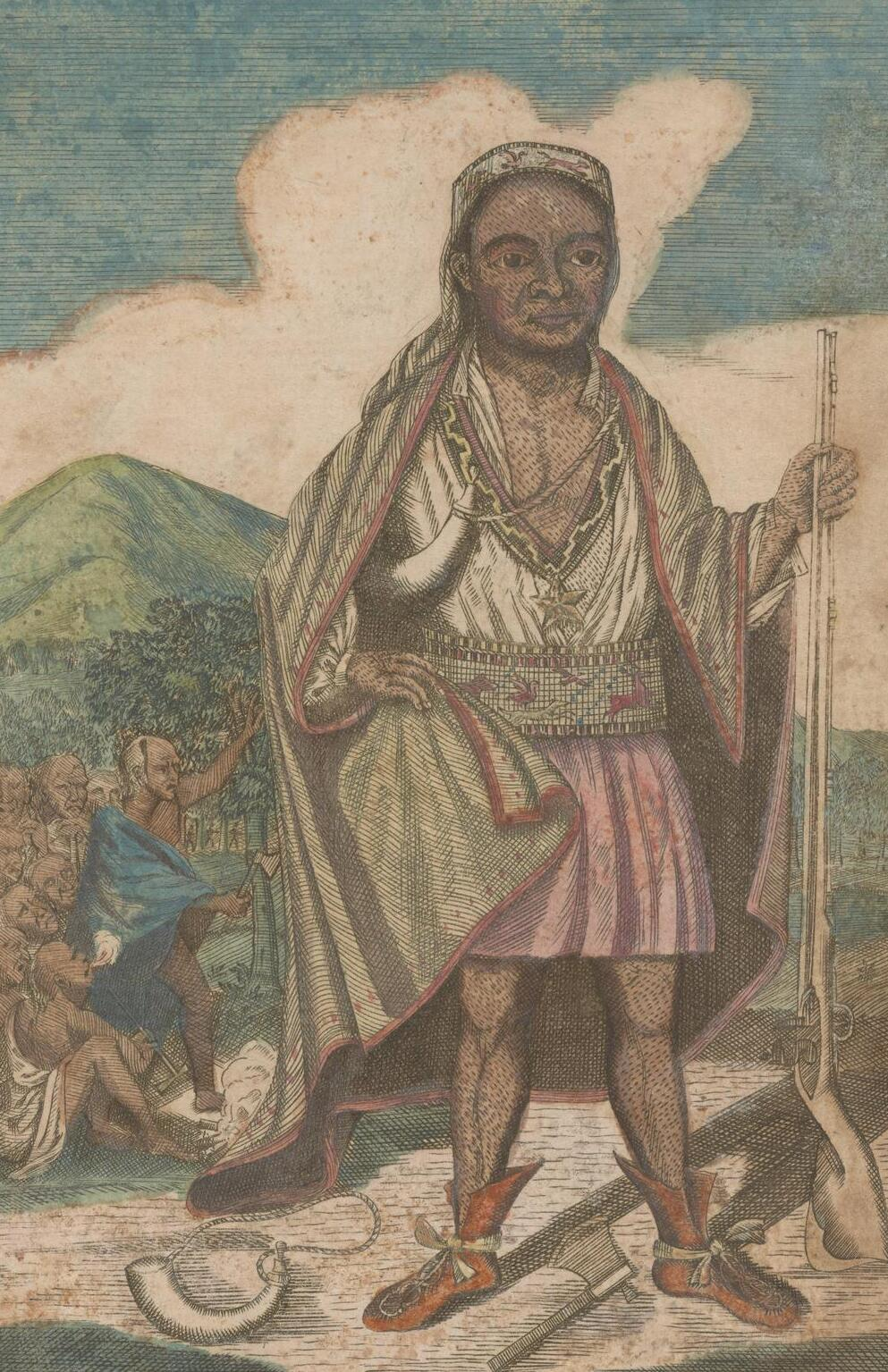
"Philip. King of Mount Hope" — 1772 engraving of a caricature by Paul Revere

=== Origin and name ===
In the late 19th century, interests in mountains as places to build recreational footpaths took root in New England with organizations such as the Appalachian Mountain Club, the Green Mountain Club, and the Connecticut Forest and Park Association. Following the pioneering effort of the Green Mountain Club in the inauguration of Vermont's Long Trail in 1918, the Connecticut Forest and Park Association, spearheaded by Edgar Laing Heermance, created the 23-mile (37 km) Quinnipiac Trail on the Metacomet Ridge in southern Connecticut in 1928 and soon followed it up with the Metacomet Trail. Over 700 miles (1,100 km) of "blue blaze trails" in Connecticut were completed by the association by the end of the 20th century.

The name "Metacomet" was borrowed from the 17th century sachem of the Wampanoag Tribe of southern New England who led his people during King Philip's War. According to popular folklore, Metacomet, also known by his English name "King Phillip", watched the burning of the village of Simsbury in 1676 from a cave on Talcott Mountain. The cave is now known as King Phillip's Cave, accessible via a side trail from the Metacomet Trail. Joseph Wadsworth is also said to have camped at the cave after saving the Charter of Connecticut from being repossessed by the King's emissary.

=== Historic sites ===
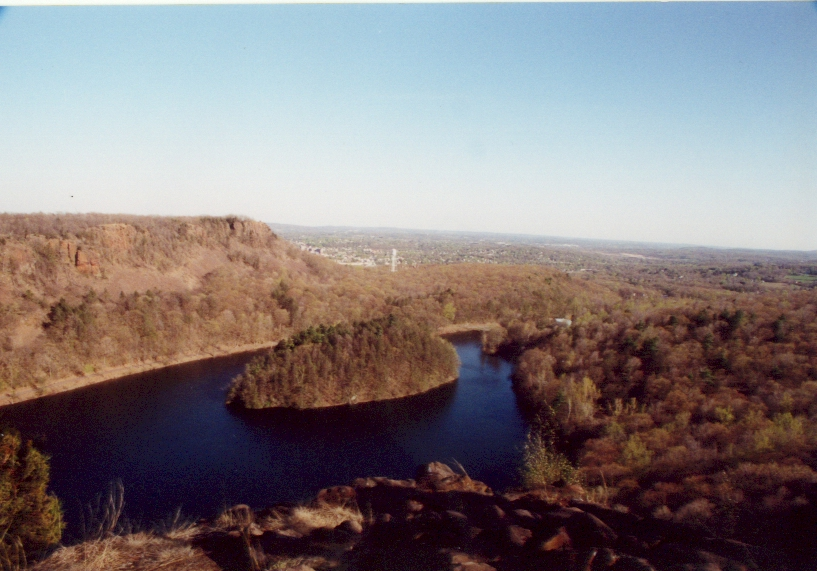
Landscape of Hubbard Park, Hanging Hills

Old Newgate Prison, located below Peak Mountain, was originally a copper mine, opened in 1705. After mining operations proved unprofitable, the colony of Connecticut converted it to a prison and named it after Newgate Prison of London. The first prisoner, John Hinson, was committed for burglary in 1773. Later Tories and Loyalists were held there during the Revolutionary War. In 1790 it became a state prison, the first such in the United States. After the prison closed in 1827 mining operations resumed for a time, but since the 1860s it has been mainly a tourist attraction. In 1972 Old Newgate Prison was declared a National Historic Landmark.

The Hanging Hills' Hubbard Park was financed by Walter Hubbard, local entrepreneur and president of the Bradley & Hubbard Manufacturing Company. Most of the land in the park was given to the town of Meriden by him, offered outright, with the stipulation that everything connected with the park was to remain free of charge for the people of Meriden, and that no concessions for profit would ever allowed within the park. Hubbard elicited the assistance of notable landscape architect Fredrick Law Olmsted in drawing up the design. Finished in 1900, it comprises approximately 1,800 acres (7.3 km^{2}) of carefully kept woodlands, streams, dramatic cliff faces, flower gardens, and the James Barry bandshell and picnic spots. Castle Craig, a stone observation tower built on East Peak, and Mirror Lake, nestled between the high ledges of East Peak and South Mountain, are considered particularly scenic.

Heublein Tower, 165 feet (50 m) tall and 1,040 feet (317 m) above sea level, built for Gilbert F. Heublein in 1914 on the summit crest of Talcott Mountain as a summer retreat and home, was designed to withstand winds of 100 mph (160 km/h). Put up for sale in the 1960s and slated for residential development, the tower became part of the Talcott Mountain State Park in 1965 through the efforts of conservation non-profit groups, the state of Connecticut, and the United States government. The tower has been renovated as a museum with period artifacts and furnishings. Visitors may climb to the top of the tower for a 360-degree view encompassing four states.

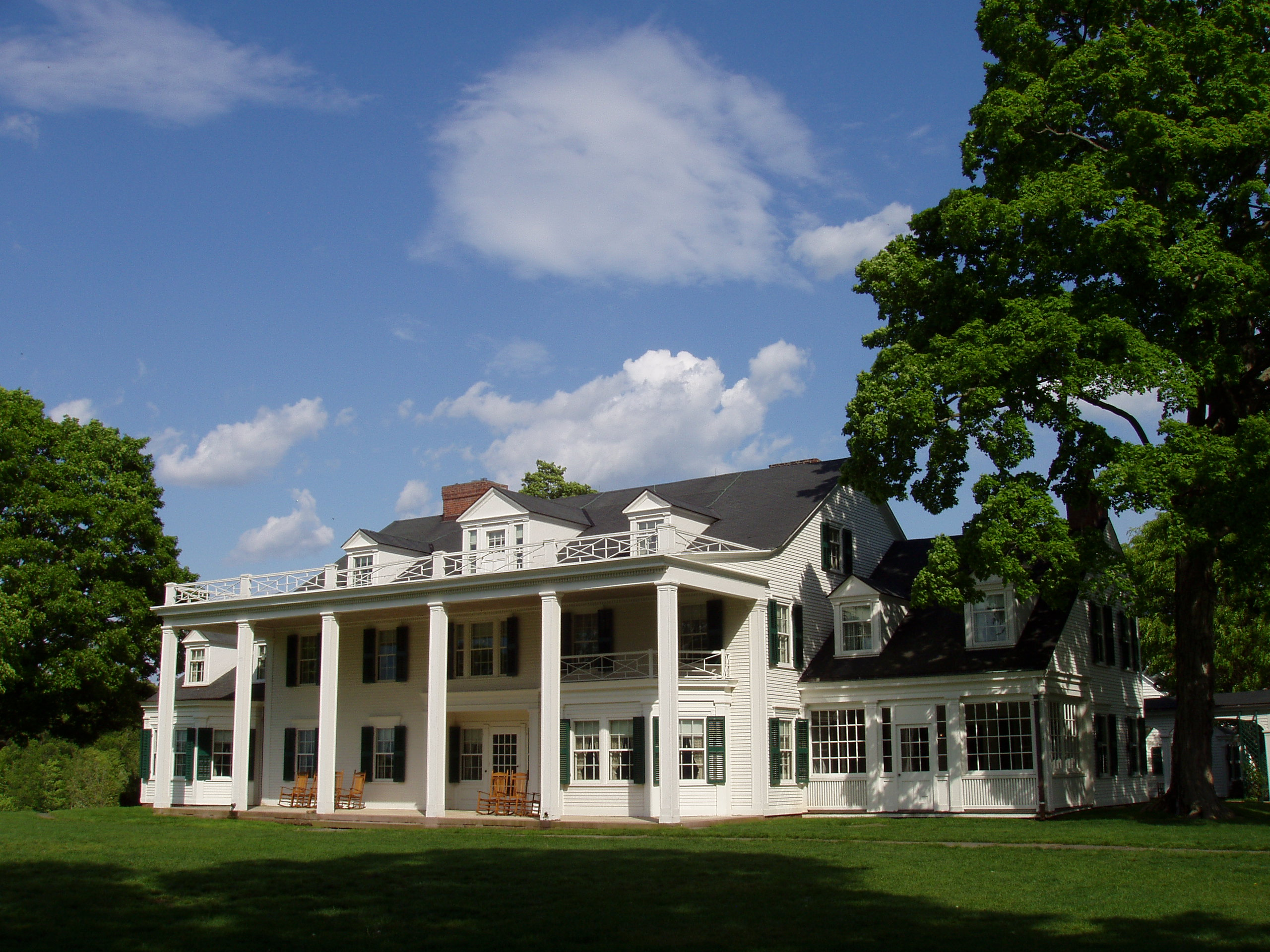
Hill-Stead Museum

Hill-Stead, now a museum, was created on 250 acres (1.0 km^{2}) of Farmington Mountain as a country estate for wealthy industrialist Alfred Atmore Pope, to the designs of his daughter Theodate Pope Riddle in 1901. Theodate inherited the house after her parents' deaths, and prior to her own passing in 1946 willed Hill-Stead Museum as a memorial to her parents. Hill-Stead comprises 152 acres (0.62 km^{2}). Buildings include the 33,000-square-foot (3,100 m^{2}) colonial-revival style Pope-Riddle House; an 18th-century farm house; a carriage garage with an arts and crafts theater; and a barn and additional farm buildings. The house is extensively furnished with paintings, prints, and art. Highlights include works by Édouard Manet, Claude Monet, James McNeill Whistler, Albrecht Dürer and postcards including correspondence from Mary Cassatt, Henry James, and James McNeill Whistler.

=== Folklore ===
Will Warren's Den, a boulder cave located on the west side of Rattlesnake Mountain, is an historic landmark of the town of Farmington. A plaque affixed to the cave reads, "Said Warren, according to legend, after being flogged for not going to church, tried to burn the village of Farmington. He was pursued into the mountains, where some Indian squaws hid him in this cave." The personage of Will Warren has never been vindicated historically, and may have been an amalgamation of several individuals. The cave is accessible from the Metacomet Trail.

The Hanging Hills are allegedly stalked by the supernatural presence of the "Black Dog of the Hanging Hills", an American example of traditional English Black dog folklore. According to local mythology extant since at least the early 19th century, the Black Dog manifests as a small black dog, often gregarious in nature, who leaves no footprints and makes no sound. To see the Black Dog the first time results in joy; a second sighting, misfortune. Seeing the Black Dog a third time would result in one's death. At least six deaths have been blamed on third meetings with the Black Dog.

== Hiking the trail ==
The trail is blazed with blue rectangles. It is regularly maintained, and is considered easy hiking, with sections of rugged and moderately difficult hiking. As the crow flies, the Metacomet Trail route is never more than a mile or two from a public road. However, cliffs and steep terrain make access much more difficult in some areas. There are no camping facilities along the trail and camping is generally prohibited. Trail descriptions are available from a number of commercial and non-commercial sources, and a complete guidebook is published by the Connecticut Forest and Park Association

Weather along the route is typical of Connecticut. Conditions on exposed ridge tops and summits may be harsher during cold or stormy weather. Lightning is a hazard on exposed summits and ledges during thunderstorms. Snow is common in the winter and may necessitate the use of snowshoes. Ice can form on exposed ledges and summits, making hiking dangerous without special equipment.

Biting insects can be bothersome during warm weather. Parasitic deer ticks (which are known to carry Lyme disease) are a potential hazard. The northern copperhead snake, while considered rare, does inhabit portions of the Metacomet Ridge in Connecticut. Poison ivy is native to the Metacomet Trail environs, prolific in some areas.

== Conservation and maintenance of the trail corridor ==
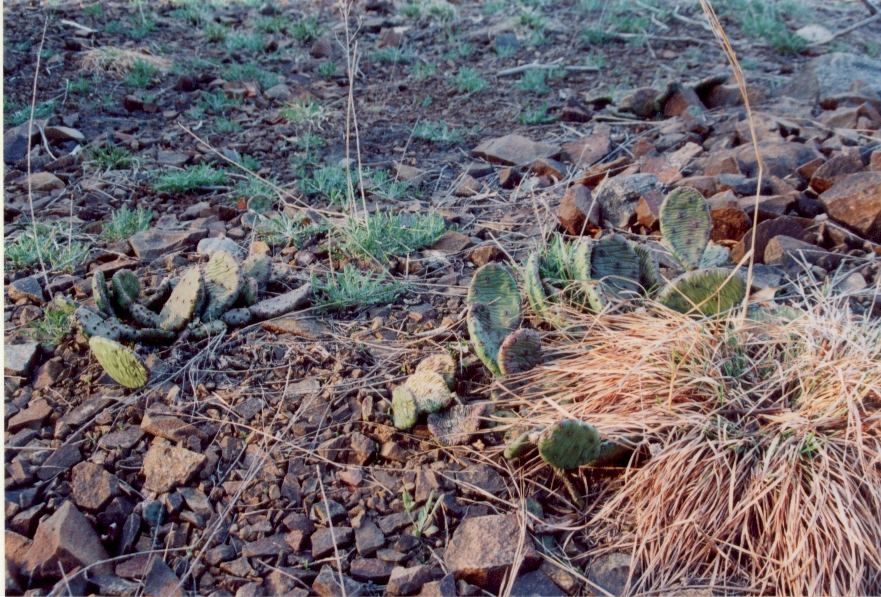
Prickly Pear Cactus, an endangered species found along the Metacomet Ridge in Connecticut

The Metacomet Trail passes through public land (state parks, town parks, and municipal watershed areas), land managed by conservation non-profit organizations, private land under conservation easement, and unprotected private land via permission of individual land owners. Significant threats to the trail, its ecosystems, and its viewshed included quarrying and suburban sprawl.

The footway of the Metacomet Trail is maintained by volunteer efforts largely facilitated by the Connecticut Forest and Park Association. Many groups are invested in preserving the landscape and ecosystem of the Metacomet Trail, including the Connecticut Department of Environmental Protection, the Metropolitan District of Connecticut (responsible for the watershed properties on Talcott Mountain), Suffield Land Conservancy, East Granby Land Trust, Farmington Land Trust, Meriden Land Trust, Berlin Land Trust, Simsbury Land Trust, Ragged Mountain Foundation, and the Avon Land Trust.

In 2000, the Metacomet Trail was included in a study by the National Park Service for possible inclusion in a new National Scenic Trail, which was officially recognized in 2009 as the New England National Scenic Trail, which also includes the Mattabesett Trail and Metacomet-Monadnock Trail.

== Recognition / Inspiration Programs ==
The Connecticut Forest and Park Association (CFPA) provides commemorative patches as recognition to hikers completing the entire length of one of the three original Blue-Blazed trails in Connecticut (Quinnipiac, Metacomet and Mattabesett). The Metacomet Trail patch can be obtained for a small fee ($1) after the hiking the entire trail is completed by contacting the Connecticut Forest and Park Association.

== See also ==
- Blue-Blazed Trails
- Metacomet Ridge
- Metacomet-Monadnock Trail
- Mattabesett Trail
