= Hubbard Park (Meriden, Connecticut) =

- U.S. National Register of Historic Places
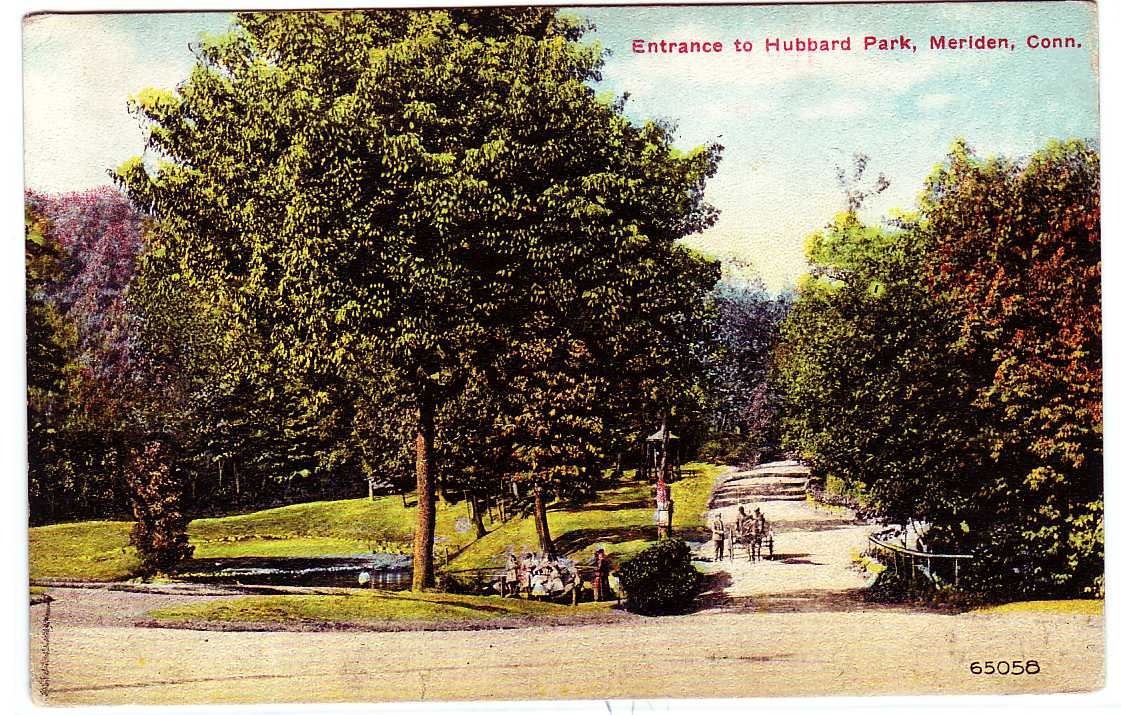
- Entrance to the park (from a 1913 postcard)
- Location: Meriden, Connecticut
- Coordinates: 41°33′45″N 72°50′5″W
- Area: 1,803 acres (730 ha)
- Architect: Quigley, Peter J.; Stuart, David, et al.
- Architectural style: Romanesque, Colonial Revival, Rustic
- NRHP reference No.: 97001466
- Added to NRHP: December 15, 1997

Hubbard Park, located in the Hanging Hills of Connecticut, is a wooded, mountainous park located just outside the city center of Meriden, Connecticut. It comprises approximately 1,800 acres (7.3 km^{2}) of carefully kept woodlands, streams, dramatic cliff faces, flower gardens, and the James Barry bandshell and picnic spots, as well as its showpiece, Mirror Lake. The park is listed on the National Register of Historic Places.

== History ==
Most of the land was given to the town by Walter Hubbard, president of the Bradley & Hubbard Manufacturing Company. In his donation, the land was given outright, with the stipulation that everything connected with the park was to remain free of charge for the people of Meriden, and that no concessions for profit were ever allowed within the park area.

Hubbard spent a great deal of time and energy creating the park. He personally spent between $400,000 and $500,000 to clear land, build roads, and construct Mirror Lake with the help of Frederick Law Olmsted, who is best known for designing New York City's Central Park. Hubbard built a tower on East Peak, known as Castle Craig, named after an ancient castle in Scotland. While others say it resembles Norman Watchtowers on Europe's Rhine River.

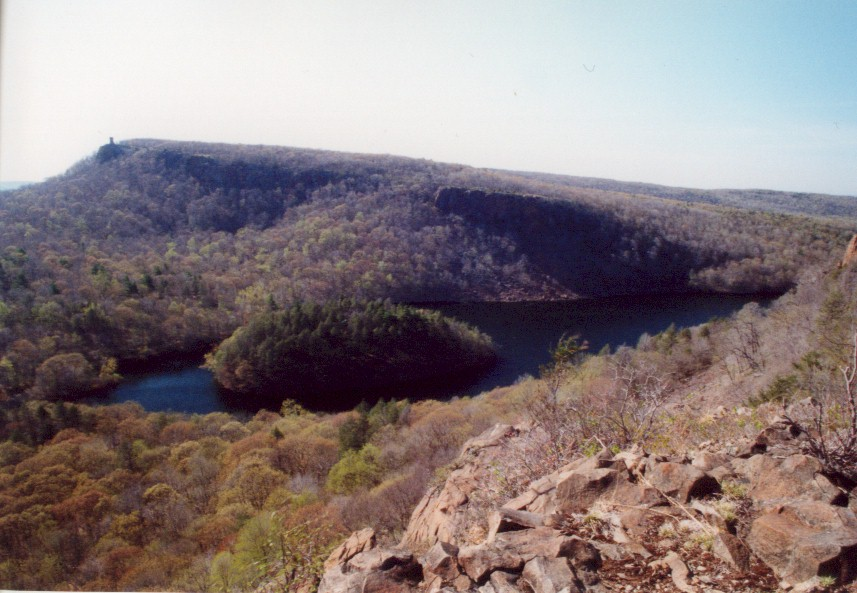
View over Hubbard Park from South Mountain. Merimere Reservoir and Mine Island Below; Castle Craig and East Peak above

== Geography ==
Hubbard Park is nestled within the Hanging Hills, a dramatic trap rock mountain ridge overlooking the city of Meriden and the Quinnipiac River Valley 900 feet (274 m) below. Two of the peaks are located within the park, South Mountain at 767 feet (234 m), and East Peak, at 976 feet (297 m). West Peak, at 1,024 feet (312 m), is located just outside the park boundary to the west. Considered particularly scenic are Merimere Reservoir (punctuated with Mine Island) and Mirror Lake, nestled between South Mountain and East Peak. Portions of the park extend into neighboring Berlin and Southington.

== Recreation ==
Hubbard Park is a popular outdoor recreation destination. The park is crossed by a number of hiking trails, most notably the 51-mile (82 km) blue-blazed Metacomet Trail (maintained by the Connecticut Forest and Park Association), which traverses East Peak and West peak the park. Trails are open to hiking, backcountry skiing; roads are open to bicycling and mountain biking. Swimming and rock climbing are prohibited. From the top of Castle Craig it is possible to see most of the Quinnipiac Valley region, Long Island Sound, and the distant higher peaks of southern New England. East Peak is often cited as the highest mountain within 25 miles (40 km) of the coastline from Cadillac Mountain in Maine to Florida, however, nearby West Peak is higher.

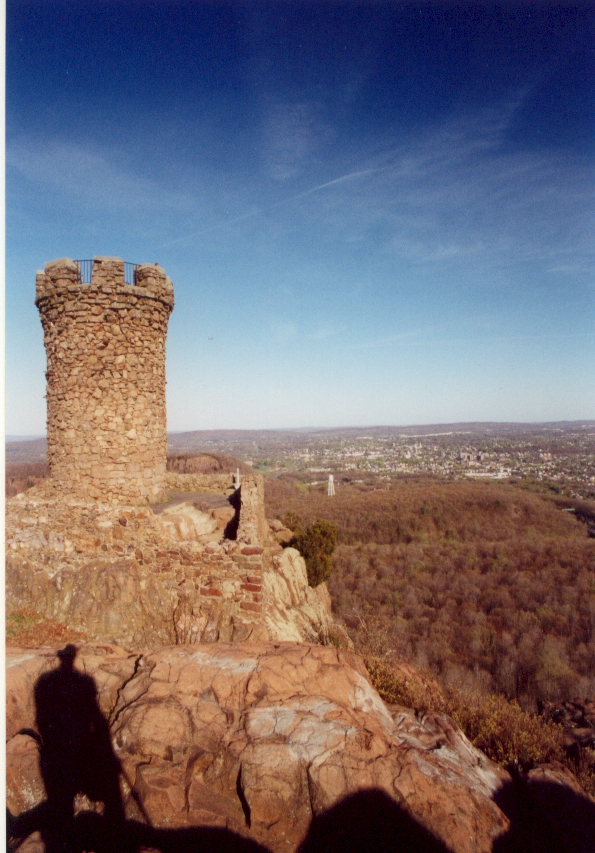
Castle Craig

The park also features a bandshell and flower gardens and is the site of a variety of local festivals and concerts, most notably the spring Daffodil Festival. Castle Craig is open to the public in season. A park road (open from May 1 through October 31 from 10:00 a.m. to 5:30 p.m.) traverses the park.

The Daffodil Festival began in 1978 as a way for the community to come together in the springtime. Held every last weekend in April, the festival is celebrated with food, a parade, fireworks, and of course daffodils. The park is filled with these yellow flowers as the number continues to rise. Hubbard Park is transformed with a craft area with booths from different artists, food tent with live music, and games and rides. Shuttle busses are available throughout Meriden including Platt High School, Wilcox Technical School, the Westfield Mall, and downtown Meriden HUB. The Daffodil Festival is free admission for all.

Hubbard Park Festival of Silver Lights 2018

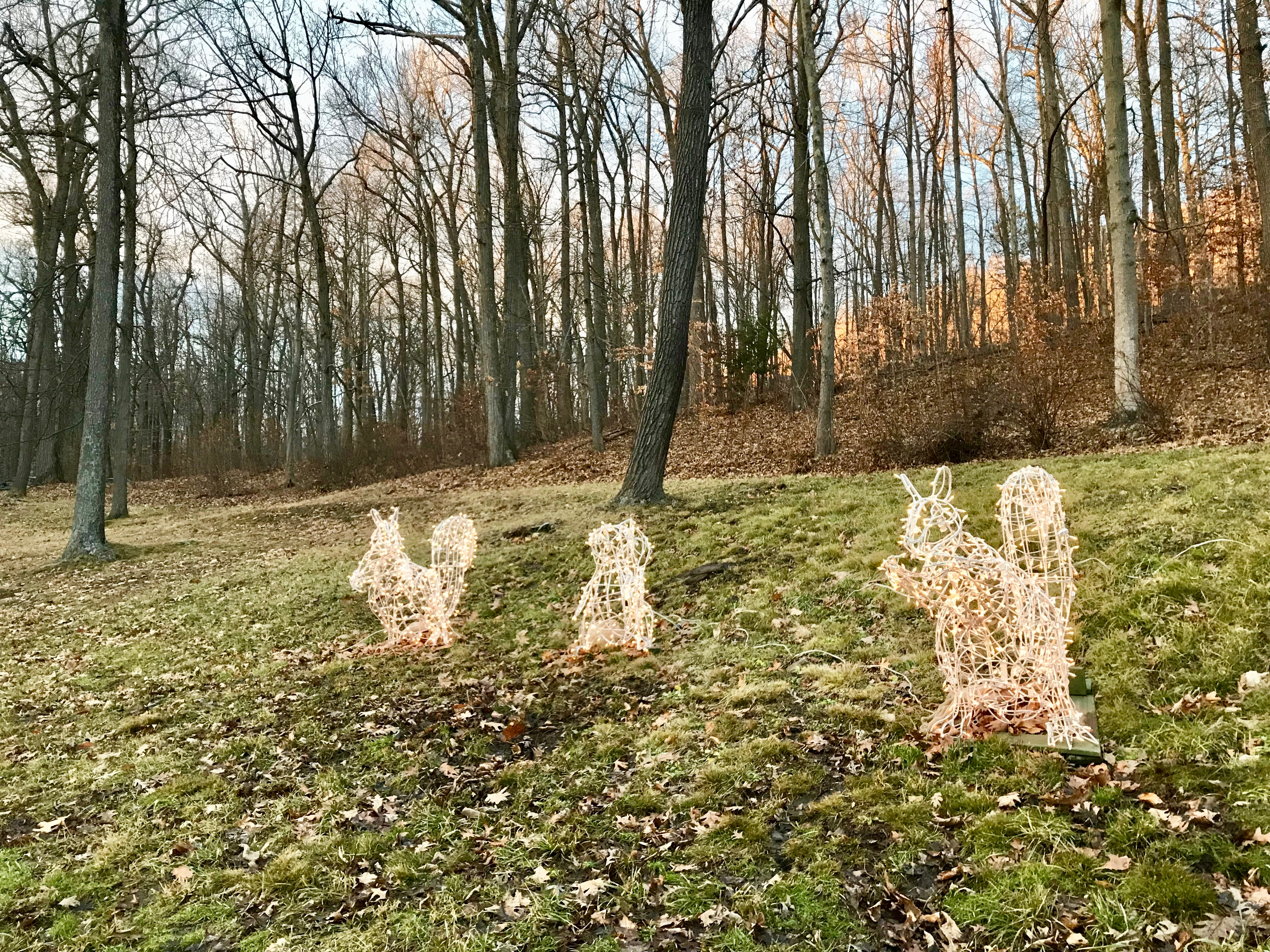
Rabbits

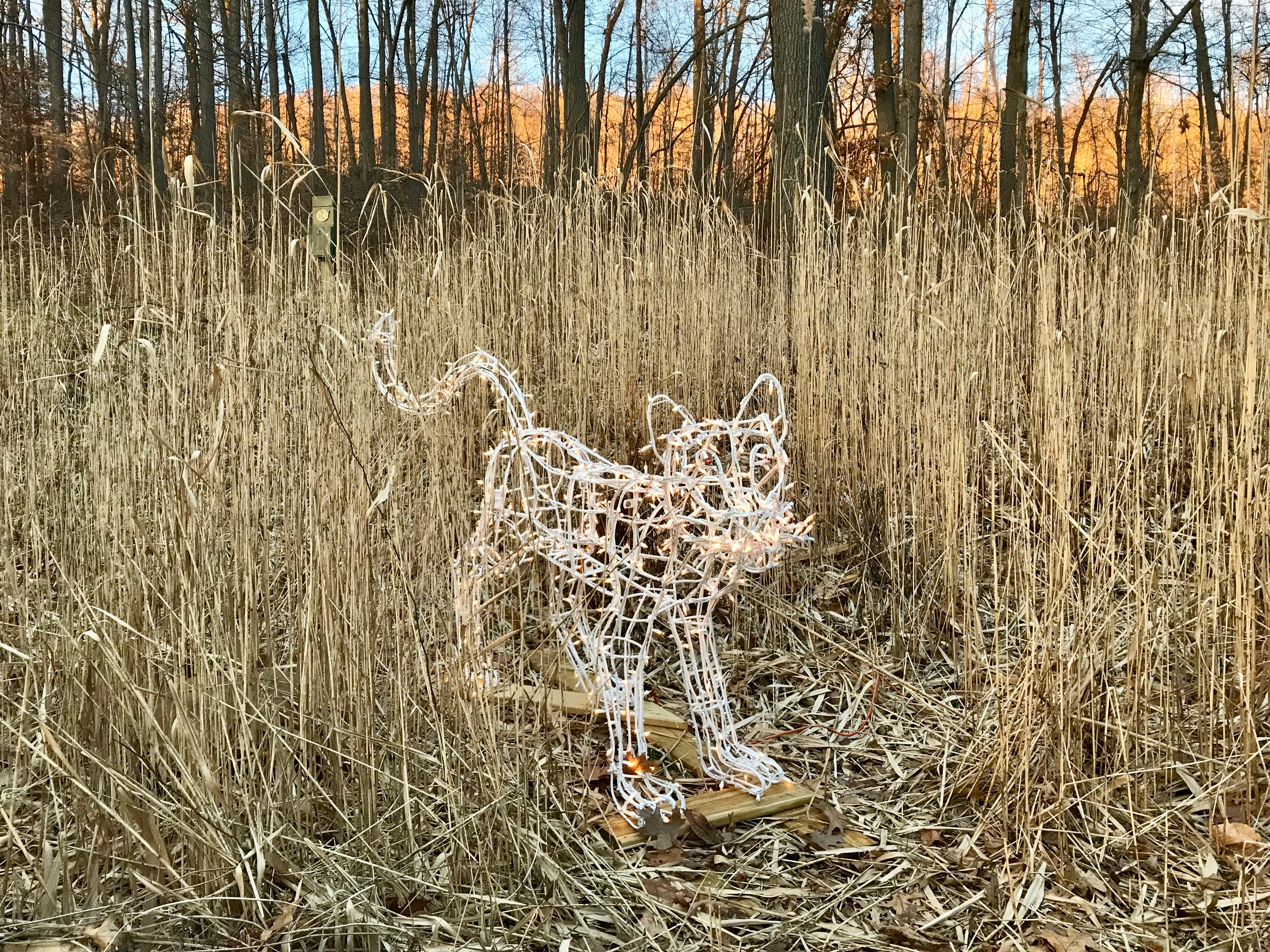
Big Cat

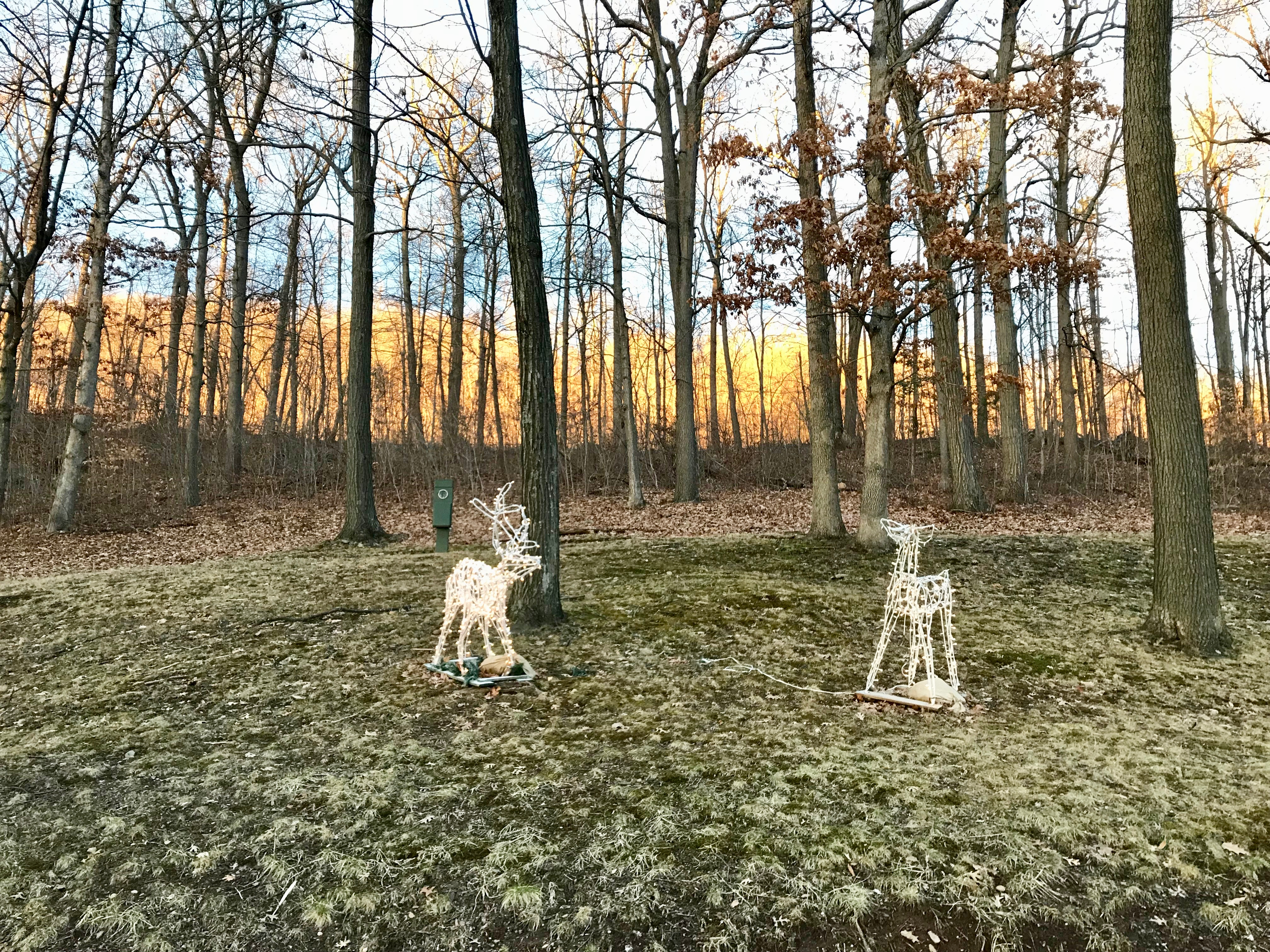
Deer

The Festival of Silver Lights is a special celebration with seasonal lights that are displayed throughout the park in the winter months. There are over 300 lighted displays throughout the park and over half a million lights are used. The lights include many forest animals, alligators, camels, the globe, a Christmas tree, and hanging snowflakes. Cars can travel through the park and be mesmerized by the beauty of the night and lights.

== Geology ==
The Hanging Hills of Meriden are part of the Metacomet Ridge, which is nearly continuous from Belchertown, Massachusetts, to Branford, Connecticut. The hanging Hills were formed by volcanic activity 200 million years ago during the rifting apart of North America from Eurasia. Two major lava flows covered the red sandstone valley in Meriden. Each cooled and hardened into trap rock (also known as basalt) and was gradually covered by sand and mud which eroded from the surrounding hills. Once the volcanic activity stopped, the whole region fractured and tilted to the west. Since then, hundreds of feet of the softer sandstone bedrock have eroded from the valley, leaving the dense, hard volcanic trap rock ridge layers standing out far above the surrounding landscape.

== See also ==
- National Register of Historic Places listings in New Haven County, Connecticut
- National Register of Historic Places listings in Hartford County, Connecticut
- National Register of Historic Places listings in Southington, Connecticut
