= West Peak (New Haven County, Connecticut) =

Mountain in Connecticut, United States of America

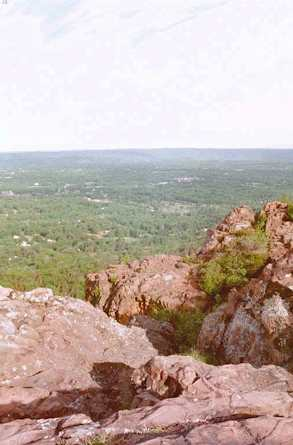
- View from West Peak

Highest point
- Elevation: 1,024 ft (312 m)
- Coordinates: 41°33′45″N 72°50′38″W

Geography
- Location: Meriden, Connecticut
- Parent range: Hanging Hills / Metacomet Ridge

Geology
- Rock age: 200 million years
- Mountain type(s): fault-block; igneous

Climbing
- Easiest route: Metacomet Trail

Should not be confused with West Rock, another traprock summit in Connecticut

West Peak, 1,024 feet (312 m), of the Hanging Hills, is the highest traprock peak in the state of Connecticut. The peak hangs above the city of Meriden 700 feet (213 m) below and is characterized by its vertical cliffs and sweeping views of southern Connecticut, Long Island Sound, and the Berkshires to the west. On a clear day, Mount Tom, in Massachusetts, can be seen 47 miles to the north.

The 62-mile Metacomet Trail crosses West Peak. Activities enjoyed on the peak include hiking, picnicking, and bird watching. West Peak is on an important raptor migration path.

Edwin Howard Armstrong, who invented FM radio and was a network radio pioneer, used West Peak as the location of one of the first FM radio broadcasts, in 1939. His original 70-foot radio mast is still there. Currently, West Peak is home to seven FM broadcast stations, WNPR, WWYZ, WZMX, WKSS, WDRC-FM, WMRQ-FM, and WHCN. It is also known as West Peak State Park.

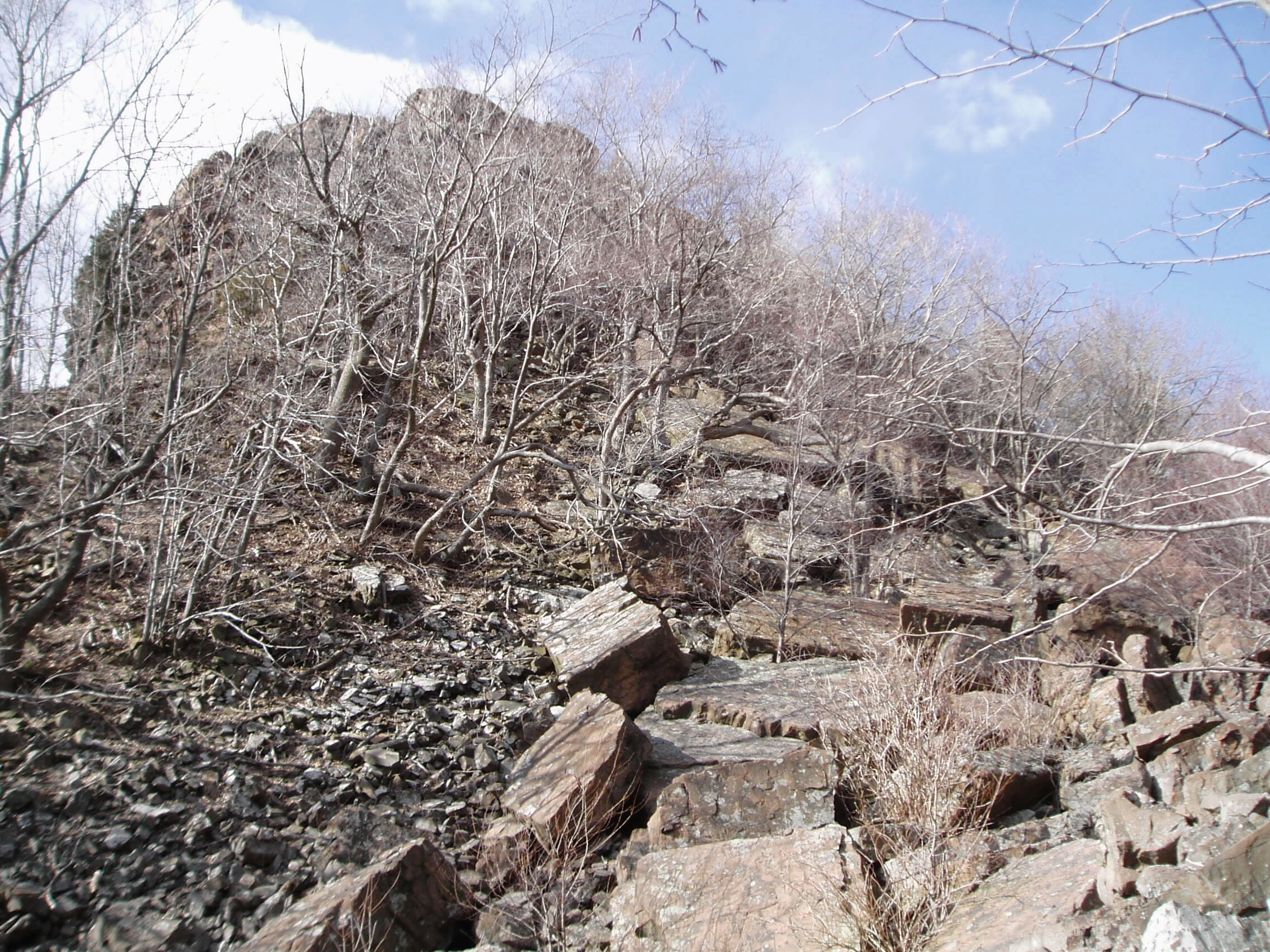
View of the cliffs of West Peak in Meriden, Connecticut as seen from below

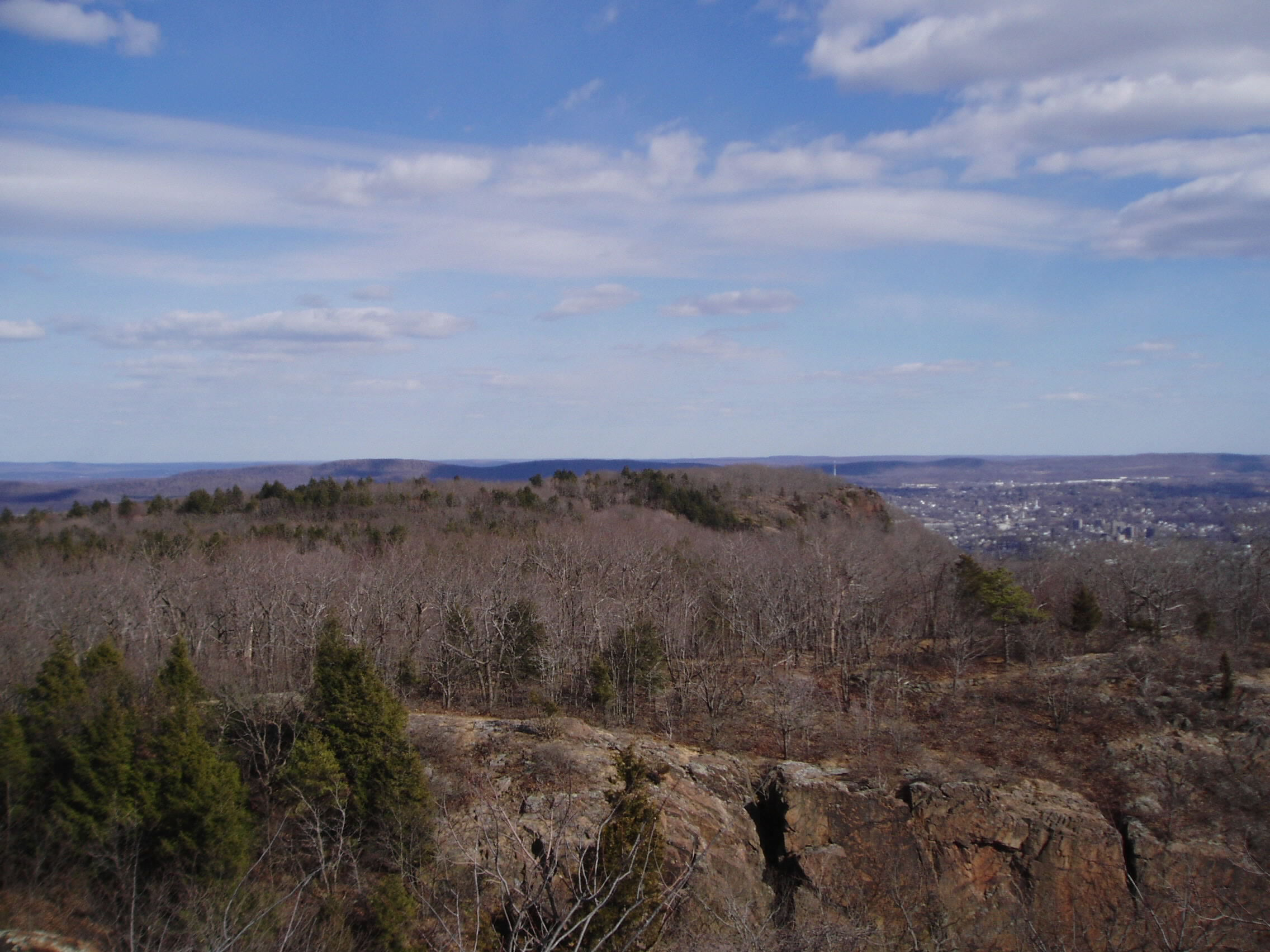
View looking east from the top of West Peak. East Peak and South Mountain, the lower peaks, are visible.

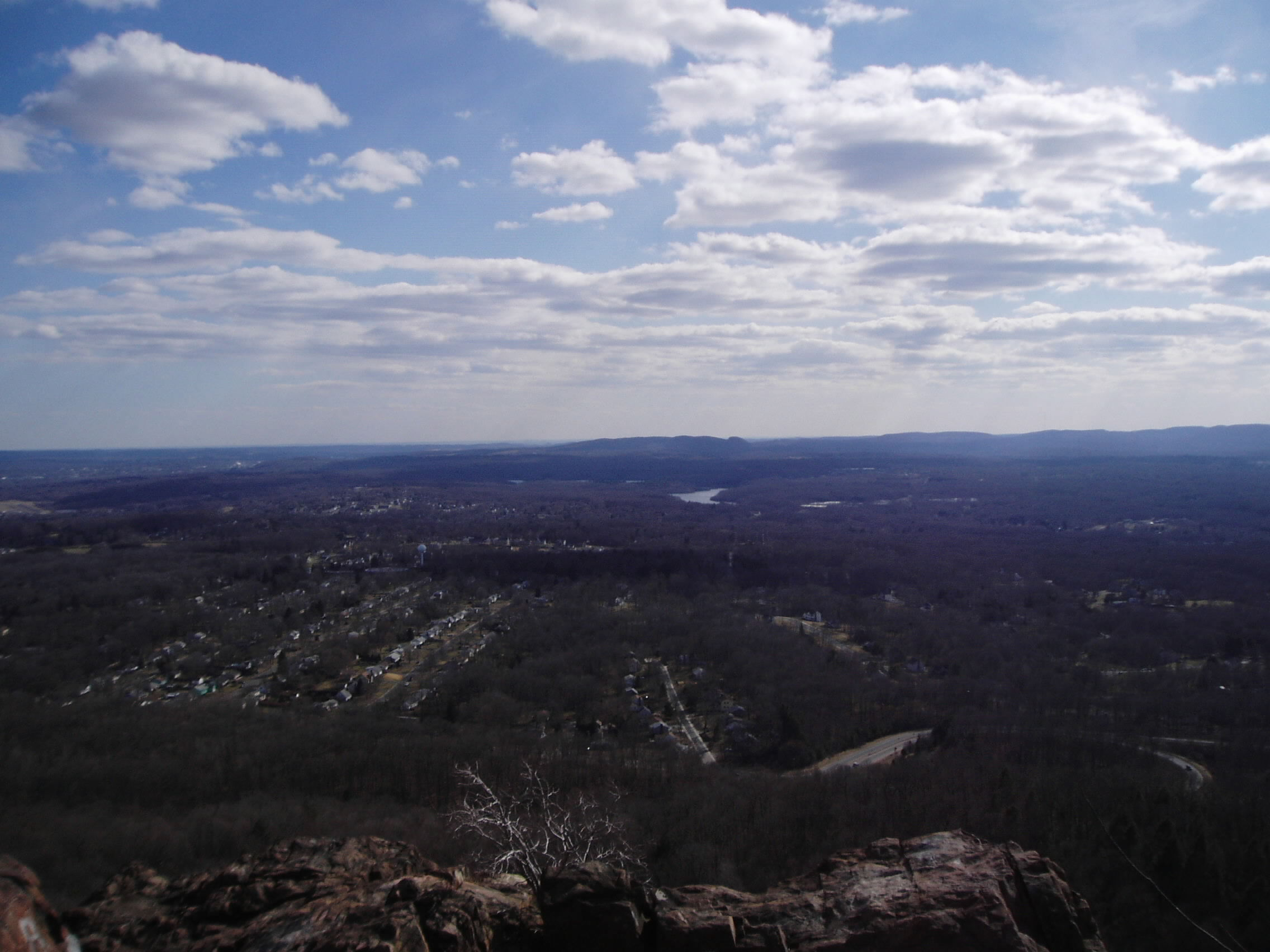
View looking south from the top of West Peak in Meriden, Connecticut. Sleeping Giant State Park can be seen.

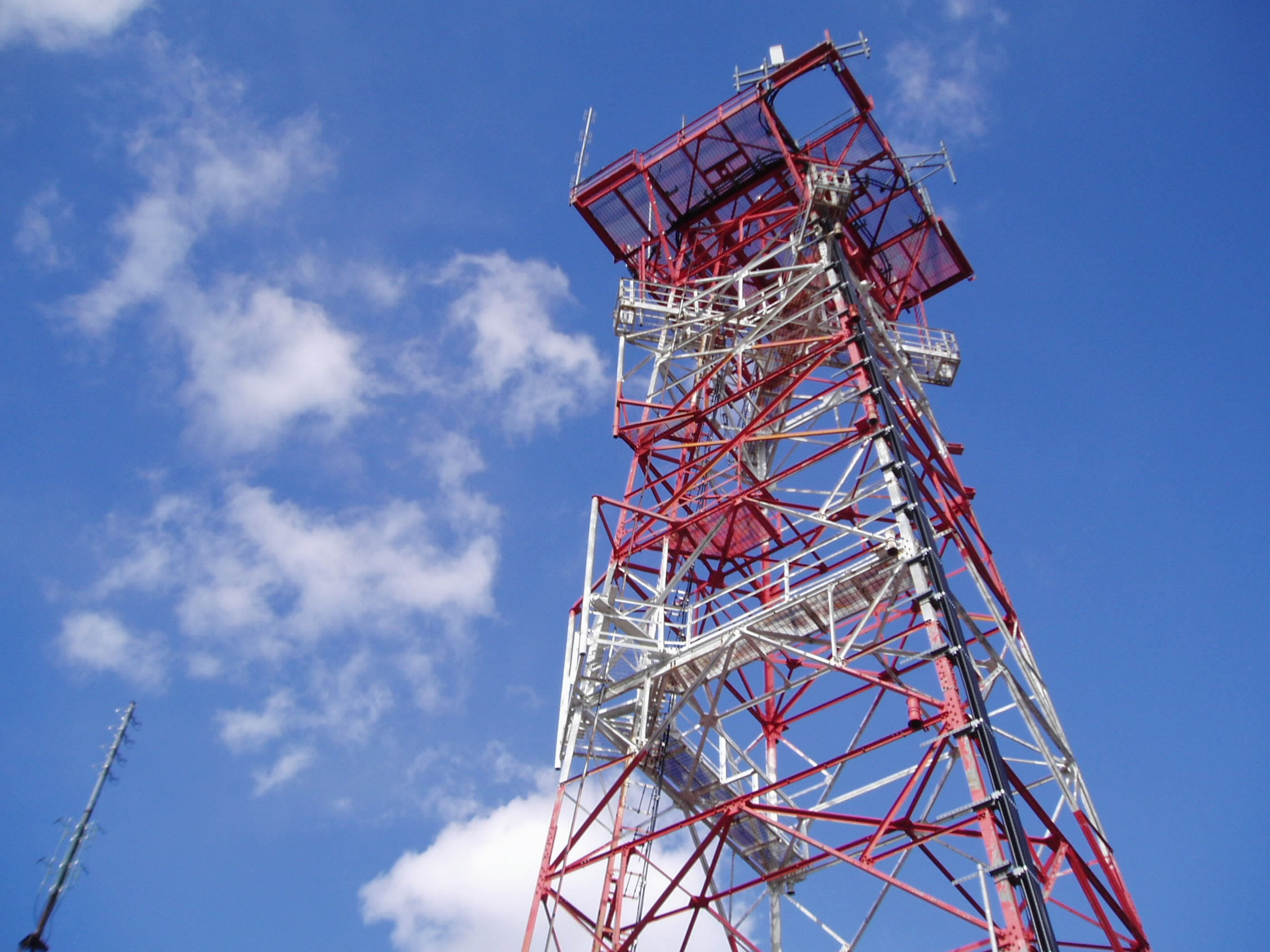
The largest transmission tower on West Peak

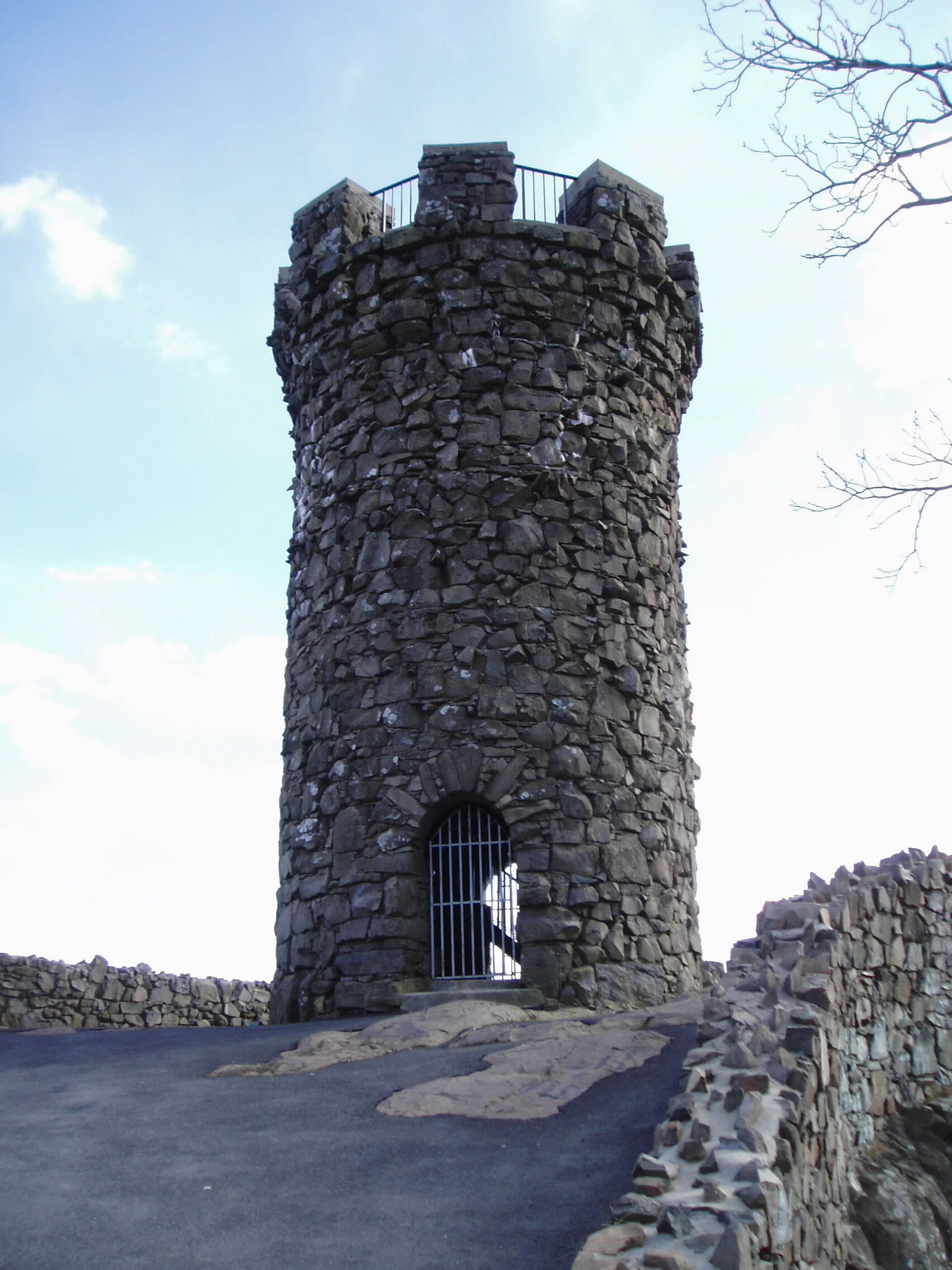
View of the lookout tower on East Peak

== Geology ==
West Peak, along with the other Hanging Hills, is part of a mountain chain that is a dormant fault line running through the middle of Connecticut and into Massachusetts.

== See also ==
- The Black Dog of the Hanging Hills
- Metacomet Ridge
- Adjacent summits:

< East

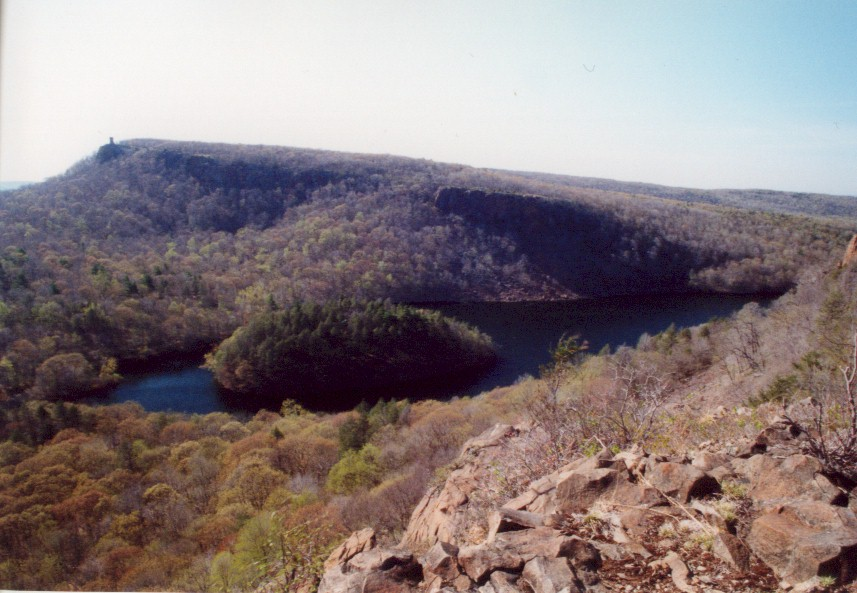
East Peak

North ↑

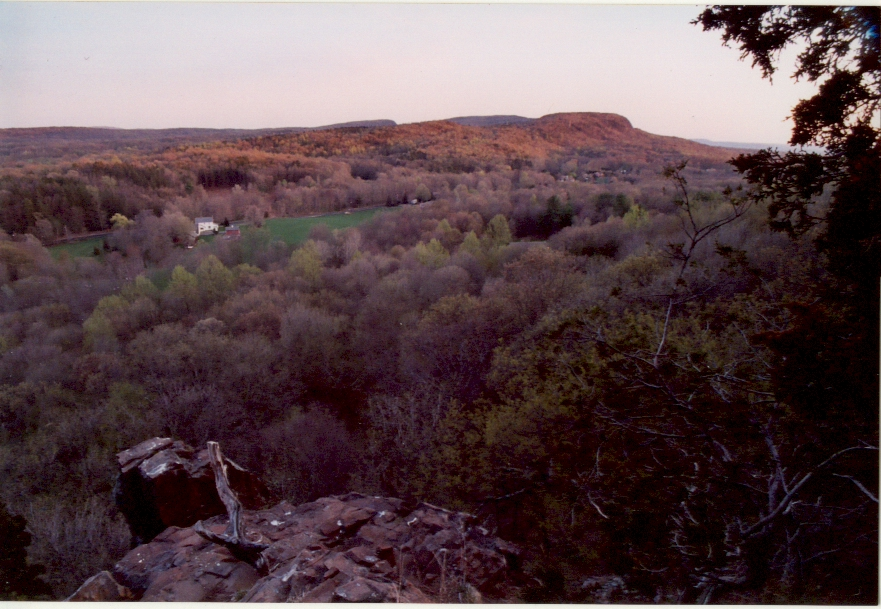
Short Mountain
