= Northern riverine forest =

Type of forest ecology

The northern riverine forest is a type of forest ecology most dominant along waterways in the northeastern and north-central United States and bordering areas of Canada. Key species include willow, elm, American sycamore, painted trillium, goldthread, common wood-sorrel, pink lady's-slipper, wild sarsaparilla, and cottonwood.

One of the distinct ecosystems is the Riverine Forest. These are found on the lower flood plains along the rivers edge. The main species found here is one of the deciduous species; the Balsam Poplar. These trees like a high volume of moisture and are able to tolerate flooding. They are distinguishable by their thick, gnarly bark and their larger, pointed leaves that have a distinct drip tip. The trees supply homes for the many native species of fauna.

Other Key trees include yellow birch, white birch, sugar maple, American beech, eastern hemlock, white pine, red pine, northern red oak, pin cherry, and red spruce.

Key shrubs include striped maple and hobblebush.
