= Hanging Hills =

Hill range in Connecticut, US

- Metacomet Ridge
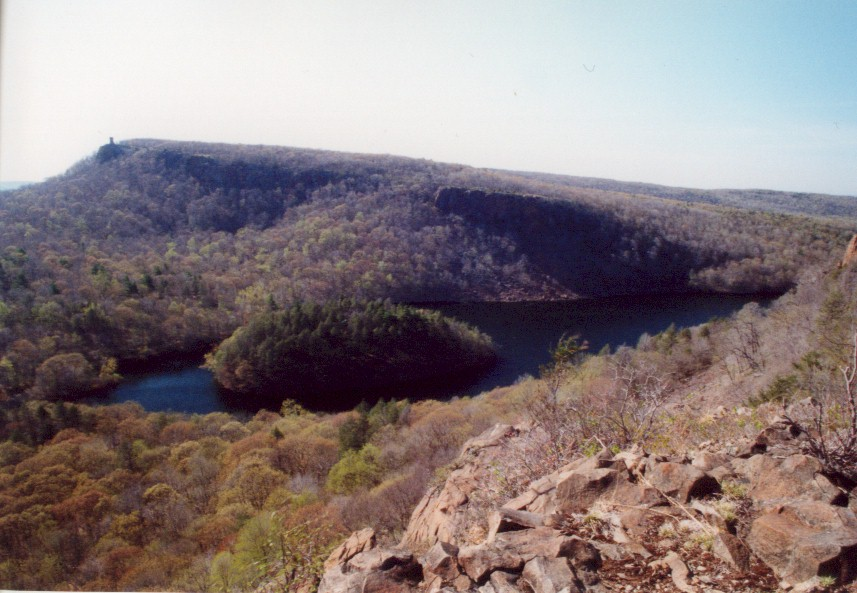
- View of East Peak and Castle Craig from South Mountain, with Merimere Reservoir and Mine Island visible below

Highest point
- Peak: West Peak
- Elevation: 1,024 ft (312 m)

Dimensions
- Length: 3 mi (4.8 km) east-west

Geography
- Country: United States
- State: Connecticut
- Range coordinates: 41°33.45′N 72°49.4′W

Geology
- Rock ages: Triassic; Jurassic
- Rock types: fault-block; igneous; sedimentary

The Hanging Hills of south central Connecticut, United States, are a range of mountainous trap rock ridges overlooking the city of Meriden and the Quinnipiac River Valley 900 feet (274 m) below. They are a subrange of the narrow, linear Metacomet Ridge that extends from Long Island Sound near New Haven, Connecticut, north through the Connecticut River Valley of Massachusetts to the Vermont border. The range is also a subrange of the Appalachian Mountains. A popular outdoor recreation resource, the range is known for its microclimate ecosystems, rare plant communities, and expansive views from cliffs that rise abruptly over 700 feet (213 m) above the surrounding landscape. The Hanging Hills encompass the 1,800-acre (7.3 km^{2}) Hubbard Park, designed with the help of landscape architect Frederick Law Olmsted. The 51 mile (80k) Metacomet Trail traverses the range.

== Geography ==
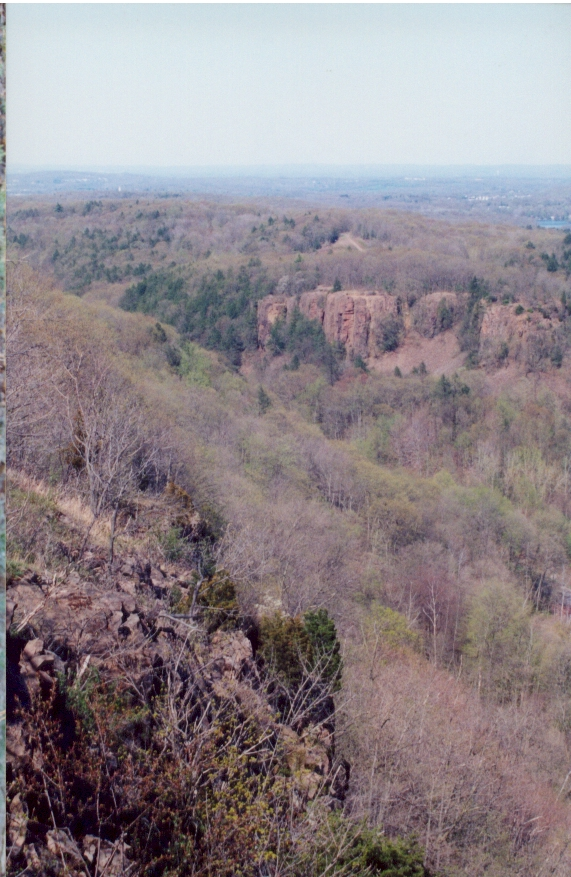
Cathole Mountain from South Mountain

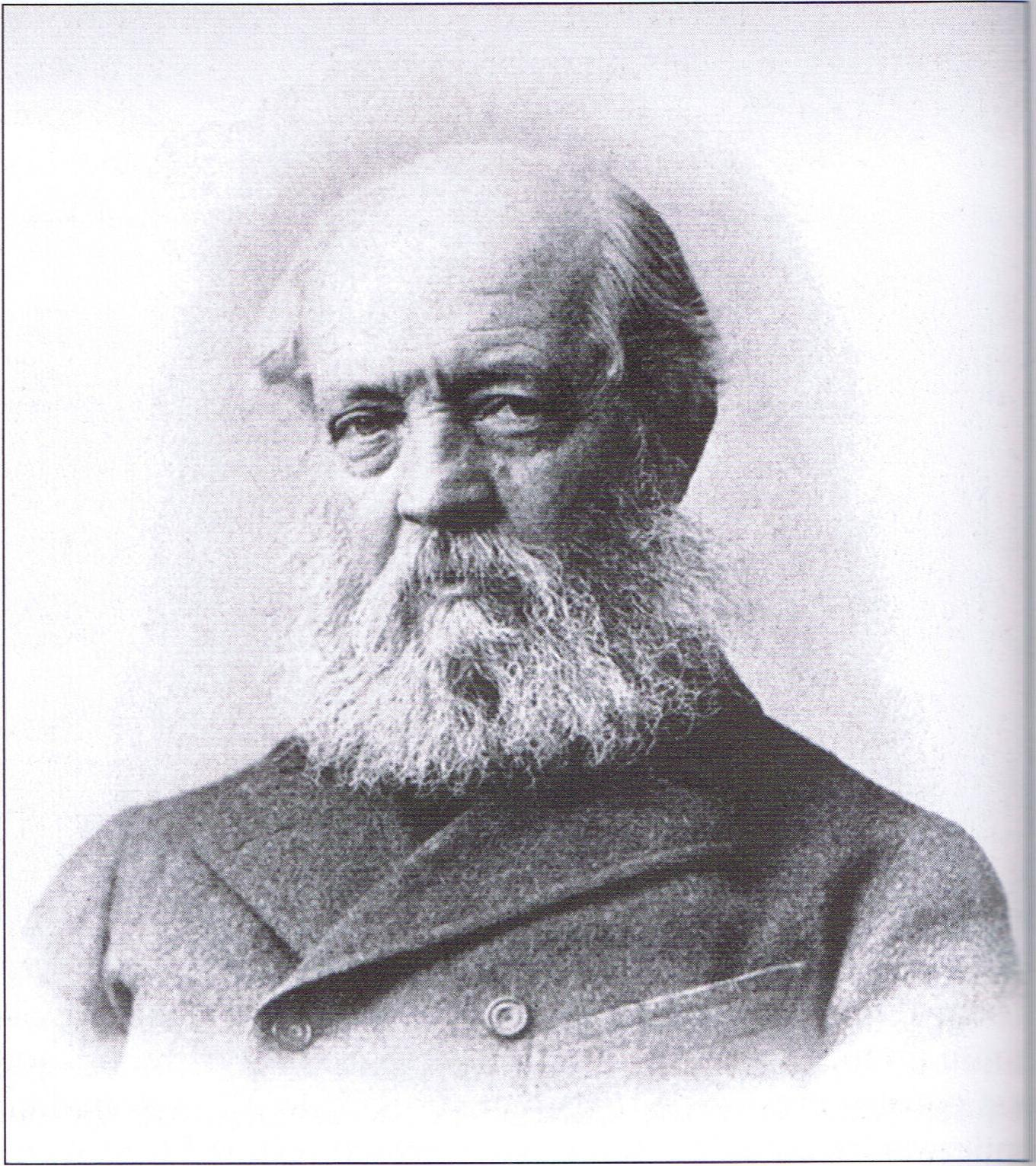
Frederick Law Olmsted

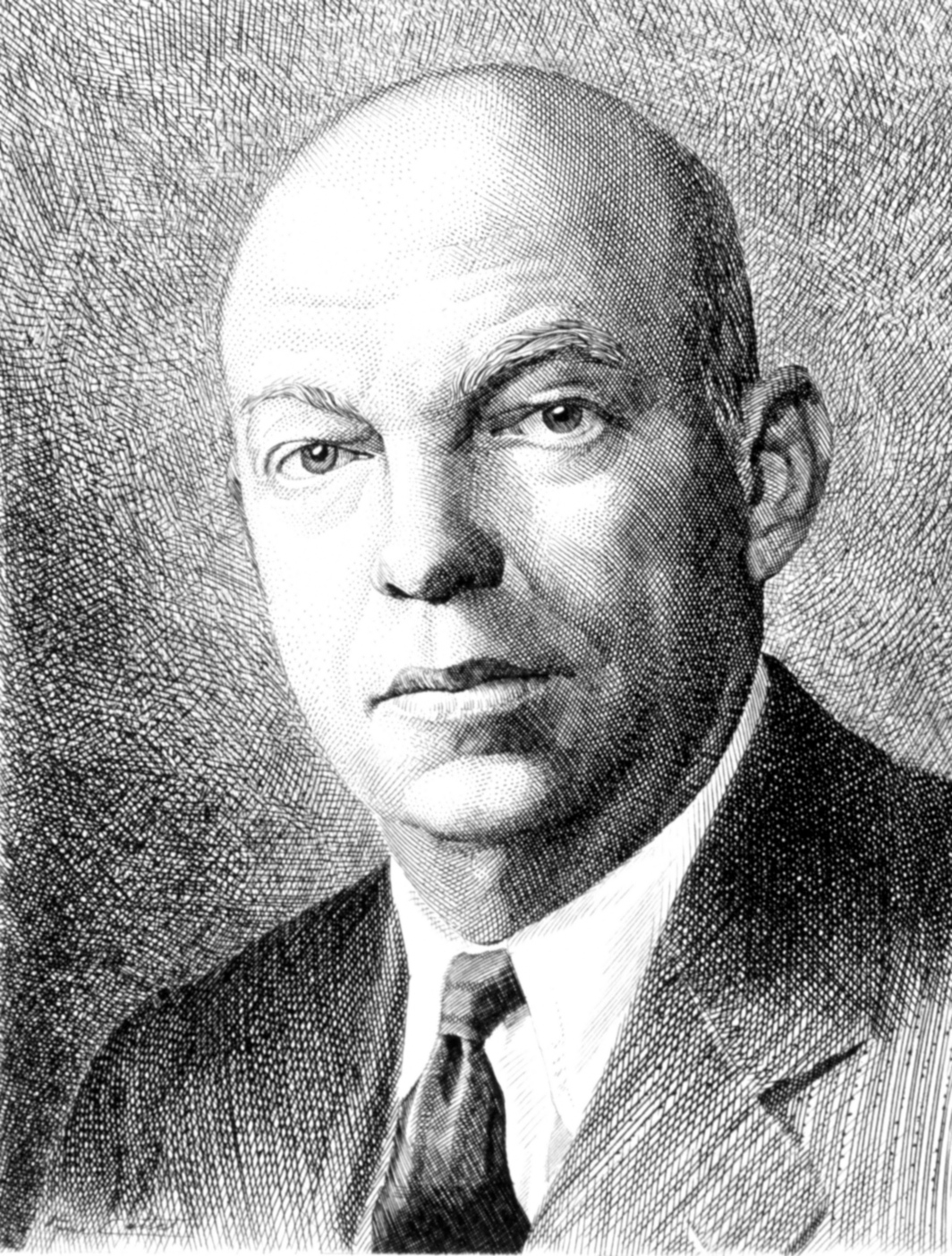
Edwin Armstrong

Located within the towns of Meriden, Southington, and Berlin, the range, roughly horseshoe-shaped with cliff faces oriented south and west, includes, from east to west, Cathole Mountain 515 feet (157 m), South Mountain 767 feet (234 m), East Peak 976 feet (297 m), and West Peak 1,024 feet (312 m). Castle Craig is a small stone tower built in 1900 on East Peak. The Metacomet Ridge extends north from the Hanging Hills as Short Mountain and Ragged Mountain and southeast as Lamentation Mountain.

The south, east, and west sides of the Hanging Hills drain into the Quinnipiac River, thence into Long Island Sound; the north side into the Mattabesset River, to the Connecticut River, thence to Long Island Sound. Several notable reservoirs and natural bodies of water are located within the Hanging Hills or beneath its slopes, including Kenmere Reservoir, Hallmere Reservoir, Elmere Reservoir, Beaver Pond, Silver Lake, Mirror Lake, and Slopers Ponds. Merimere Reservoir, nestled between South Mountain and East Peak and punctuated by the rocky mass of Mine Island, is considered particularly scenic.

== History ==
The Hanging Hills' Hubbard Park was financed by Walter Hubbard, local entrepreneur and president of the Bradley & Hubbard Manufacturing Company. Hubbard elicited the assistance of eminent landscape architect Frederick Law Olmsted in drawing up the design.

Edwin Howard Armstrong, a network radio pioneer who invented FM radio, used West Peak as the location of one of the first FM radio broadcasts, in 1939. His original 70-foot (21 m) radio mast still stands on the peak. Currently, West Peak is home to seven FM broadcast stations, WPKT, WWYZ, WZMX, WKSS, WDRC-FM, WMRQ-FM and WHCN.

== Geology ==
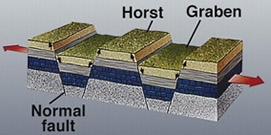
Faulting

The fault-block Hanging Hills were formed 200 million years ago during the Triassic and Jurassic periods and are composed of trap rock, also known as basalt, an extrusive volcanic rock. Basalt is a dark colored rock, but the iron within it weathers to a rusty brown when exposed to the air, lending the ledges a distinct reddish appearance. Basalt frequently breaks into octagonal and pentagonal columns, creating a unique "postpile" appearance. Huge slopes made of fractured basalt scree are visible beneath many of the ledges of the Hanging Hills; they are particularly visible along the base of East Peak where it plunges into Merimere Reservoir. The basalt cliffs are the product of several massive lava flows hundreds of feet deep that welled up in faults created by the rifting apart of North America from Eurasia and Africa. These basalt floods of lava happened over a period of 20 million years. Erosion occurring between the eruptions deposited deep layers of sediment between the lava flows, which eventually lithified into sedimentary rock. The resulting "layer cake" of basalt and sedimentary sheets eventually faulted and tilted upward. Subsequent erosion wore away the weaker sedimentary layers a faster rate than the basalt layers, leaving the abruptly tilted edges of the basalt sheets exposed, creating the distinct linear ridge and dramatic cliff faces visible today. The best way to imagine this is to picture a layer cake tilted slightly up with some of the frosting (the sedimentary layer) removed in between. Subsequent scour by moving glacial ice plucked away the basalt from the steep southern end of the crest of the broken ridge, creating overhanging cliffs. In the Meriden region, numerous northeast-trending normal faults offset the volcanic flows and intervening sedimentary rocks. Several of these faults break the Metacomet Ridge north of Meriden. Stream erosion and glacial ice carved canyons along these faults, dividing the ridge into the finger-like promontories of the Hanging Hills. Merimere Reservoir was built in the fault-controlled valley between East Peak and South Mountain.

== Ecosystem ==
The Hanging Hills host a combination of microclimates unusual in New England. Dry, hot upper ridges support oak savannas, often dominated by chestnut oak and a variety of understory grasses and ferns. Eastern red cedar, a dry-loving species, clings to the barren edges of cliffs. Cooler north facing backslopes tend to support extensive stands of eastern hemlock interspersed with the oak-hickory forest species more common in the surrounding lowlands. Narrow ravines crowded with hemlock block sunlight, creating damp, cooler growing conditions with associated cooler climate plant species. Talus slopes are especially rich in nutrients and support a number of calcium-loving plants uncommon in eastern Connecticut. Because the trap rock ridges generate such varied terrain, they are the home of several plant and animal species that are state-listed or globally rare.

The Hanging Hills are also an important seasonal raptor migration path.

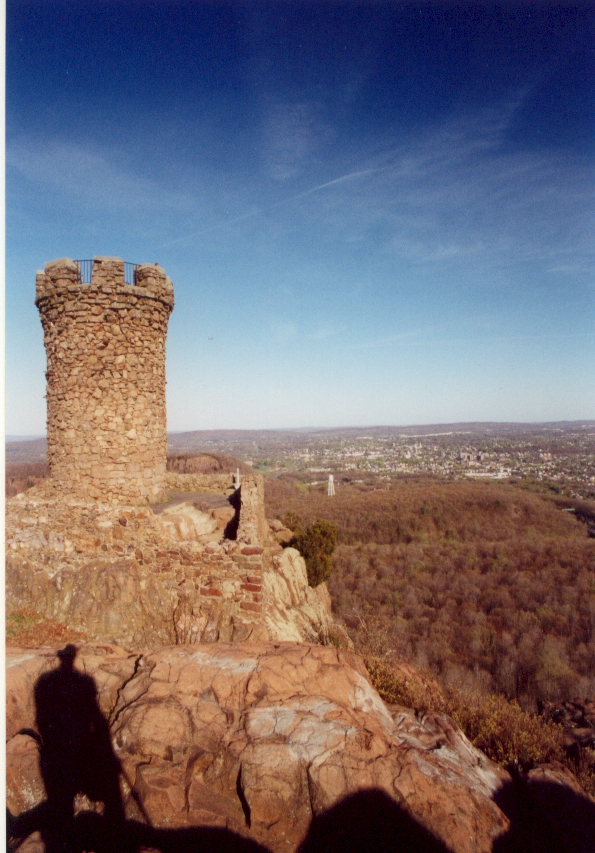
Castle Craig /East Peak overlooking Meriden

== Recreation ==
The Hanging Hills are a popular outdoor recreation resource. Hubbard Park features a bandshell and flower gardens and is the site of a variety of local festivals and concerts, most notably the spring Daffodil Festival. A park road leads to Castle Craig Tower and is open from April through October from 10:00 a.m. to 5:00 p.m. A number of trails, most notably the 51 mile (80k) blue-blazed Metacomet Trail (maintained by the Connecticut Forest and Park Association), traverse the range. Trails are open to hiking, backcountry skiing, and snowshoeing; roads are open to bicycling and mountain biking. Swimming is prohibited. Rock climbing is only permitted for Ragged Mountain Foundation members who have obtained a permit from Meriden's parks and recreation department. From the top of the Hanging Hills' many cliffs it is possible to see much of the Quinnipiac River Valley region, Long Island Sound, and the distant higher peaks of southern New England.

== Conservation ==
Much of the Hanging Hills have been conserved as parkland, municipal water supply, or conservation easement. Private landowners also hold significant acreage, particularly on the east and north sides of the range. In 2000, the Hanging Hills were included in a study by the National Park Service for the designation of a new National Scenic Trail now tentatively called the New England National Scenic Trail, which would include the Metacomet-Monadnock Trail in Massachusetts and the Mattabesett Trail and Metacomet Trail trails in Connecticut.

A number of regional and local non-profit organizations are active in conserving the landscape and ecosystems of the Hanging Hills, most notably the Connecticut Forest and Park Association, the Meriden Land Trust, and the Berlin Land Trust.

== See also ==
- List of subranges of the Appalachian Mountains
- Metacomet Ridge
- Metacomet Trail
- Mattabesett Trail

Adjacent summits:

East >

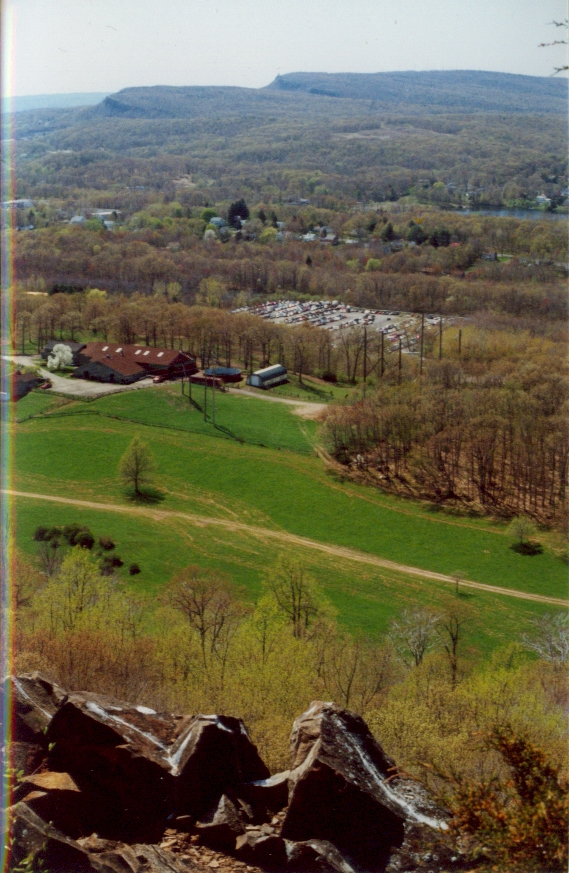
Lamentation Mountain

North ↑

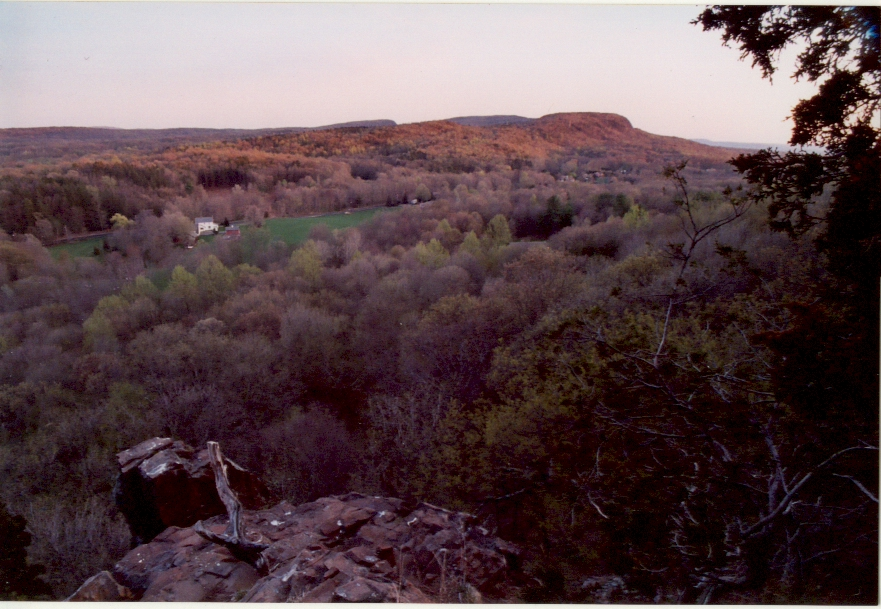
Short Mountain

South ↓

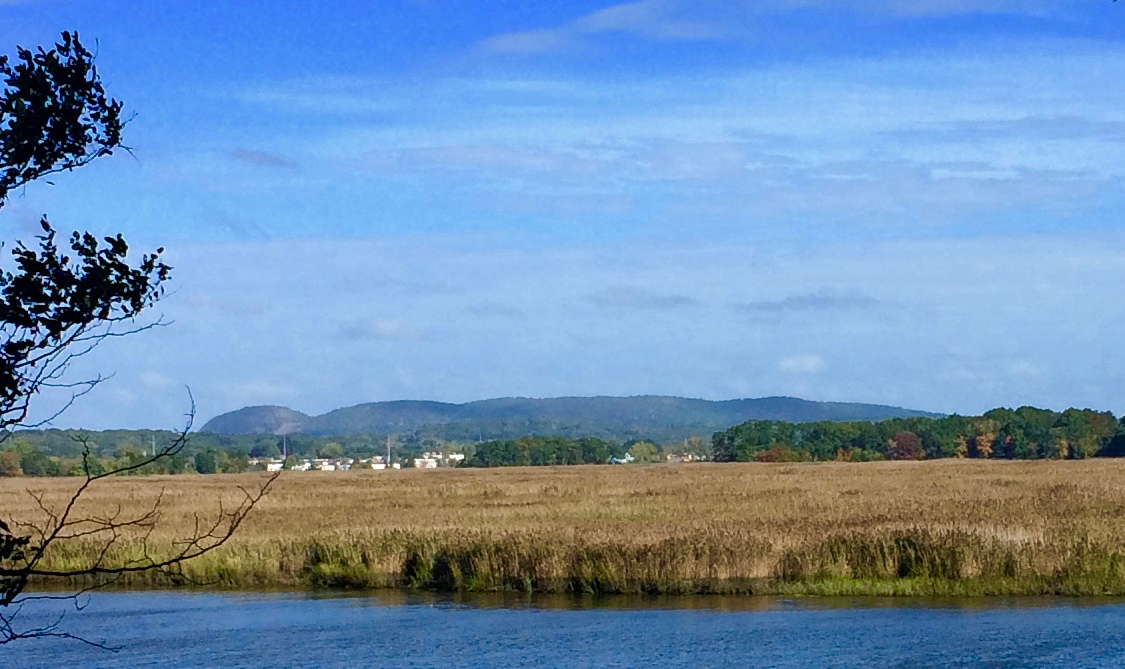
Sleeping Giant (Connecticut)
