= Castle Craig =

Castle in Connecticut, United States

Coordinates: 41.5565°N 72.8354°W

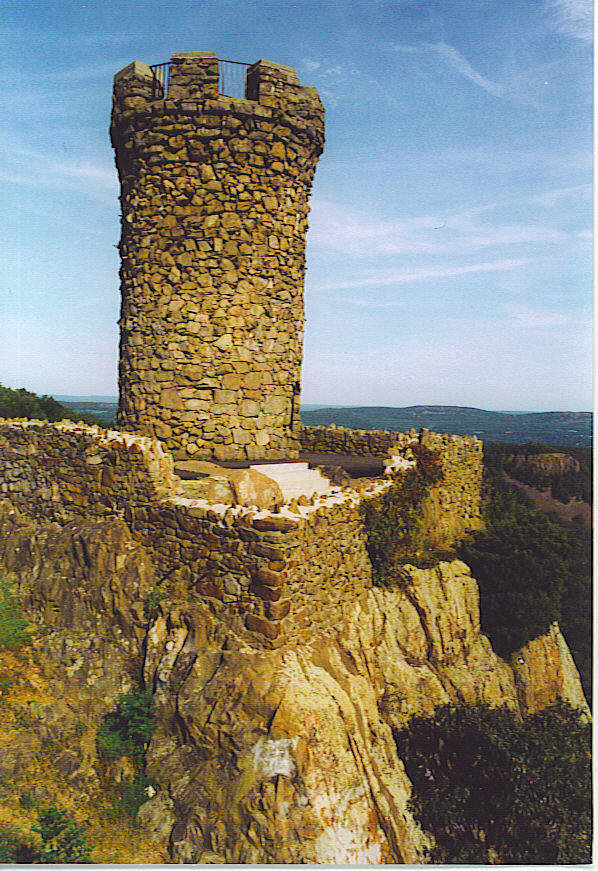
Castle Craig, c. 2002

Castle Craig, located on East Peak in the Hanging Hills, is constructed of trap rock and is 32 feet (10 m) in height and has a base 58 feet (18 m) in circumference. A metal interior stairway is used to ascend the observation deck on top. It stands 976 feet (297 m) above sea level and provides an expansive view of the greater Meriden, Connecticut area.

== Origin and details ==
Castle Craig, dedicated October 29, 1900 and given to the people of Meriden, Connecticut by Walter Hubbard is part of the 1,800-acre (7.3 km^{2}) Hubbard Park named after Hubbard. There are hiking trails to the tower (most notably the 62-mile (100 km) Metacomet Trail) as well as Reservoir Road which is open for vehicular traffic from May 1 to October 31, 10 a.m. to 5:30 p.m., and is open to pedestrians and cyclists year-round during normal park operating hours (sunrise to sunset). From the top of the observation tower, 1,002 feet (305 m) elevation, it is possible to see New Haven and Long Island Sound 25 miles (40 km) to the south. To the west, the foothills of the Berkshires are visible; to the north, the Hartford skyline as well as the summit of Mount Tom in Massachusetts.

The inspiration for the tower's design has been disputed for years. Some say Walter Hubbard, a world traveler, was inspired by a Norman French tower; others by a 12th Century Turkish tower on the Danube; still others maintain that it was patterned upon an ancient tower in Craigellachie, Scotland.

== Dedication of Tower ==
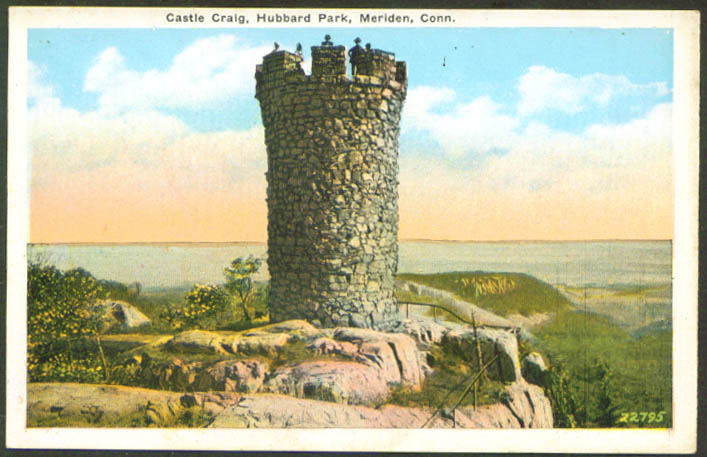
Postcard, c. 1910–1920

On October 29, 1900 dedicatory exercises were held at which Mr. Hubbard formally presented the Tower to the City of Meriden. According to a local newspaper,

A large number of members of the Court of Common Council, together with other dignitaries attended an oyster roast in the shadow of the Tower. Westbound trolleys were crowded with citizens who used this form of transportation to bring them to the park area from where they had a long, arduous trek, on foot, to the Tower. There were also a number of persons who drove to the top of the mountain in their own carriages. At two o'clock, it was estimated that approximately 250 guests were in attendance. Their genial host, Mr. Hubbard, had provided six barrels of clams. These were roasted over a big fire under the direction of C.W.F. Pardee of the Winthrop Hotel and P.J. Quigley, a local contractor, with the assistance of twelve men. The Tower itself was the center of attraction and nearly everyone had something to say concerning the beautiful scenery and Mr. Hubbard's benevolence. During the afternoon, several group photographs were taken. Three cheers were given to Mr. Hubbard by the visitors. They were called for by Judge Wilbur F. Davis, who acclaimed Mr. Hubbard as the "first citizen of Meriden". A large flag was raised on the tower at noon by Contractor Quigley and as it floated to the breeze three rousing cheers were given.

== Plaque ==
A plaque at the bottom of the tower reads as follows:

Castle Craig

Dedicated October 29. 1900

Castle Craig Tower stands 32 feet (9.8 m) high on 976-foot (297 m) east peak in Meriden's Olmsted designed Hubbard Park. It has the distinction of being the highest point within 25 miles (40 km) of the coast from Maine to Florida. Its design origins are clouded. Some say its native trap rock construction resembles Norman watchtowers on Europe's Rhine River while others claim it was modeled and named after an ancient castle in Scotland.

Meriden industrialist Walter Hubbard donated the tower and the surrounding park, which a grateful Meriden named after him. The tower is one of the highlights of the 1,800-acre (7.3 km^{2}) park from its observation deck. Looking south one can observe Long Island Sound and on a clear day, the outline of Long Island itself. To the north, Southern Massachusetts Berkshire Hills come into view. Hubbard Park is on the National Register of Historic Places.

Although the plaque indicates that East Peak is "the highest point within 25 miles (40 km) of the coast from Maine to Florida," West Peak, just 2,000 feet (610 m) to the west, at 1,024 feet (312 m), is higher than both East Peak and the tower. Both East and West Peak are lower than a number of mountains in the Downeast coastal region of Maine.
