= Ragged Mountain (Connecticut) =

Mountain ridge in Connecticut, U.S.

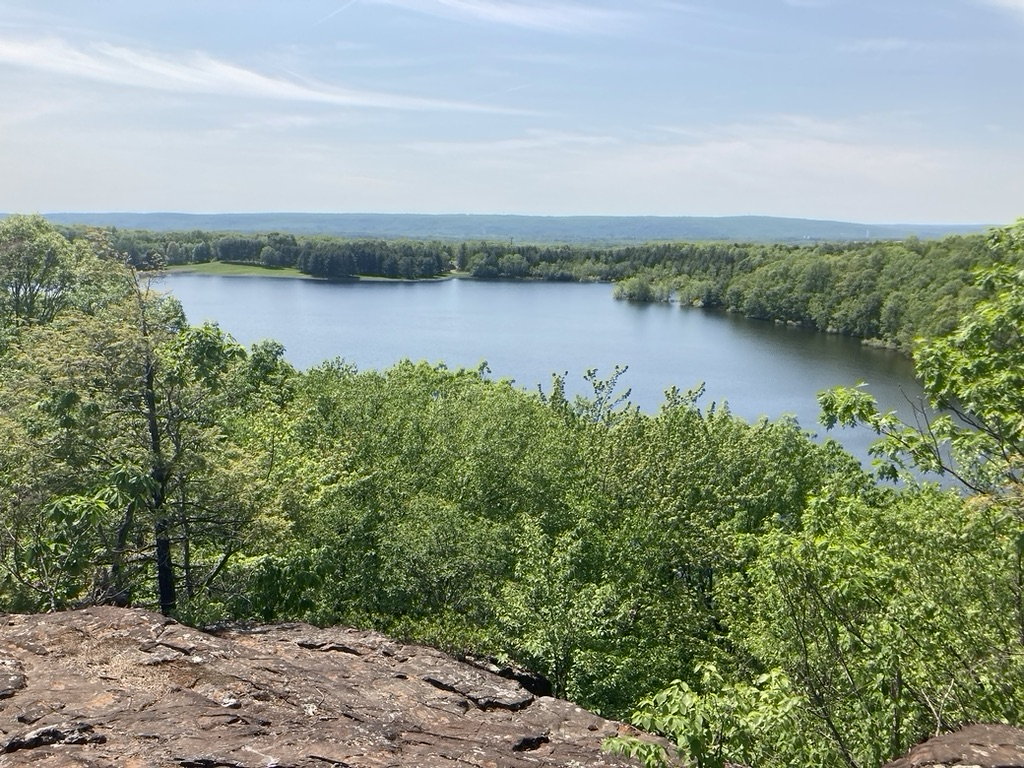
- South Wassel Reservoir from Ragged Mountain summit

Highest point
- Elevation: est. 761 ft (232 m)
- Parent peak: 41° 37' 03"N, 72° 49' 22"W
- Coordinates: 41°37′03″N 72°49′22″W

Geography
- Location: Southington and Berlin, Connecticut
- Parent range: Metacomet Ridge

Geology
- Rock age: 200 Ma
- Mountain type(s): Fault-block; igneous

Climbing
- Easiest route: Red Dot Trail

Ragged Mountain, est. 761 feet (232 m), is a traprock mountain ridge located 3 miles (5 km) west of New Britain, Connecticut, in the towns of Southington and Berlin, Connecticut. It is part of the narrow, linear Metacomet Ridge that extends from Long Island Sound near New Haven, Connecticut, north through the Connecticut River Valley of Massachusetts to the Vermont border. The mountain, a popular hiking and rock climbing attraction located between metropolitan Hartford and Meriden, is known for expansive vistas, vertical cliff faces, mountain ridge reservoirs, unique microclimate ecosystems, and rare plant communities. Ragged Mountain is traversed by the 51-mile (82 km) Metacomet Trail.

== Geography ==
Occupying an area roughly 2.5 by 1.75 miles (4.02 by 2.82 km), Ragged Mountain rises steeply 500 feet (150 m) above the Quinnipiac River valley to the west. The mountain consists of a series of high bluffs and several lower tiers of ledges. The Metacomet Ridge continues north from Ragged Mountain as Bradley Mountain and south as Short Mountain and the Hanging Hills. Four bodies of water are located on the mountain: Shuttle Meadow Reservoir to the north between Ragged Mountain and Bradley Mountain; Wassel Reservoir nestled between the bluffs in the center of Ragged Mountain; a smaller holding pond associated with Wassel Reservoir (South Wassel Reservoir, a.k.a. Hart Pond); and the two Hart's Ponds, on the southeast slope of the mountain. The mountain also contains boulder caves and a waterfall. Wassel Reservoir is named for RMSN David Wassel, a submariner in the U.S. Navy who was lost in the accidental sinking of the USS Thresher off the coast of Massachusetts.

The west side of Ragged Mountain drains into the Quinnipiac River, thence to Long Island Sound; the east side of the mountain drains into the Mattabasett River, then to the Connecticut River, thence to Long Island Sound. However, some reservoirs on the mountain shuttle water through treatment facilities with alternate drainages.

== Geology and ecology ==
Ragged Mountain, like much of the Metacomet Ridge, is composed of basalt, also called traprock, a volcanic rock. The mountain formed near the end of the Triassic Period with the rifting apart of the North American continent from Africa and Eurasia. Lava welled up from the rift and solidified into sheets of strata hundreds of feet thick. Subsequent faulting and earthquake activity tilted the strata, creating the cliffs and ridgeline of Ragged Mountain. Hot, dry upper slopes, cool, moist ravines, and mineral-rich ledges of basalt talus produce a combination of microclimate ecosystems on the mountain that support plant and animal species uncommon in greater Connecticut. Ragged Mountain is also an important raptor migration path.

== Recreation and conservation ==
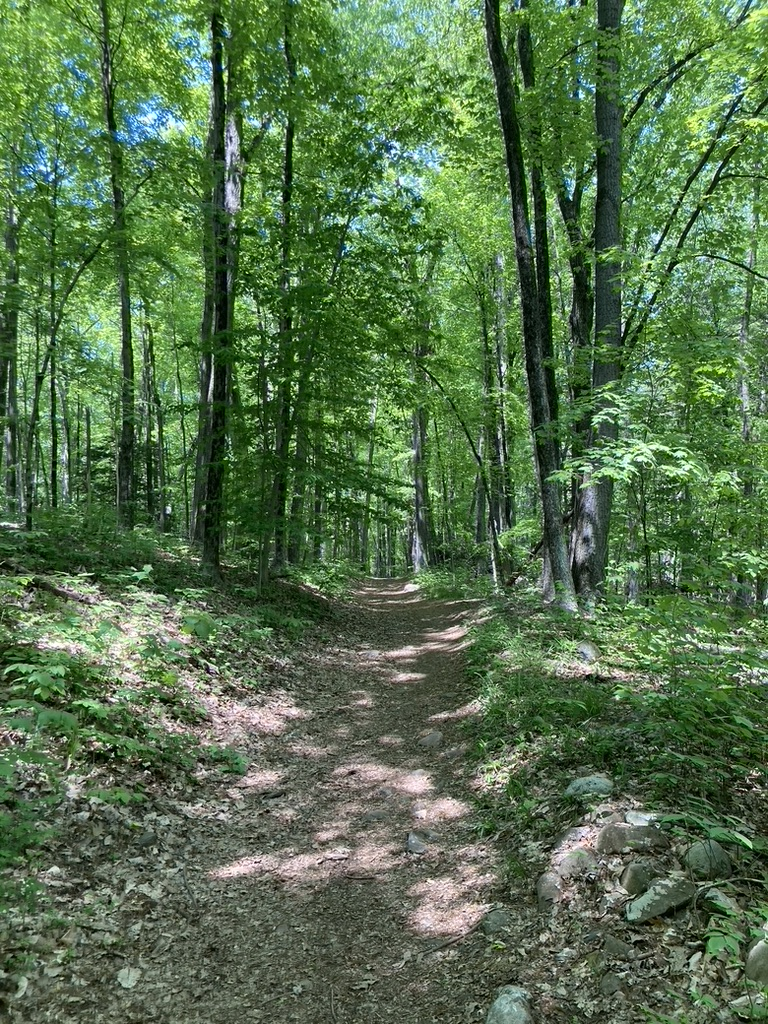
Preserve Trail

Ragged Mountain is open to rock climbing, hiking, snowshoeing, bouldering, and other passive pursuits. Cliff diving and swimming in Wassel Reservoir is strictly prohibited. The mountain offers expansive views of the surrounding landscape from open summits and high cliff faces. A number of hiking trails and rock climbing routes traverse the mountain including the 51-mile (82 km) Metacomet Trail, (maintained by the Connecticut Forest and Park Association), which extends from the Hanging Hills of Meriden, Connecticut, to the Massachusetts border. The mountain is considered to be Connecticut's most popular rock climbing destination. Cliff routes were pioneered in the 1930s, with Fritz Wiessner prominent among rock climbers.

Both the Connecticut Forest and Park Association (hiking) and the Ragged Mountain Foundation (rock climbing) have noted that issues with parking and access to certain cliff faces have historically resulted in conflicts with land owners and abutting property owners. As of 2007, Ragged Mountain had one trailhead, located on West Lane, located off Connecticut Route 71A in Berlin, 2.75 miles (4.43 km) south of downtown New Britain.

Wassel Reservoir has two dams, one on the NE and one on the S. It engulfs the small ridge called Shuttle Meadow Mtn, formerly traversed by the Blue Trail, on three sides. At the northern end the reservoir is fronted by a series of sheer cliffs on both sides where it fills a deep rift valley. On the Ragged Mt. side the diving cliffs begin with a tall face set back ten feet from the water and 60 feet (18 m) high, called the "Running Man" on account of the running jump necessary to clear the trees and boulders at the base. Below it, going north, is a succession of steadily declining sheer cliffs much closer to the water, running from 50 feet (15 m) down to 40 at the end, with a single isolated chimney at the terminus that stands a few feet lower. Paths lead around wooded slopes to the next wall, a jutting ridge of knife-cut basalt that extends out into deep water, an even 35–40 feet high save at the southern end where it descends to 20 feet (6.1 m). The dam carved back some of this wall in its creation. The wall extends beyond the reservoir by half a mile.

On the other side the bluffs are much lower, from ten to twenty feet going south along Shuttle Meadow Mtn. Opposite "Running Man" the cliffs turn sharply inland, making a bay, along the north side of which they rise upward in a great staircase of perhaps six or seven steps, each step five feet. Then the cliff turns south again in a sheer face fifty feet high. Swimming in this reservoir is of course illegal and the Water Department Patrol Unit under (Al Mackiewicz) with assistance from the local police do patrol there, so it is not encouraged.

Much of Ragged Mountain has been conserved as nature preserve, rock climbing preserve, and as public watershed lands. Shuttle Meadow and Wassel Reservoirs are managed by the New Britain Water Department; the Metacomet Trail passes along their shores. Hart's Pond is also managed By New Britain Water Dept.and a short walking trail, the Amelia Green Trail, passes along its shore. The Ragged Mountain Foundation, a non-profit rock climbing association, manages fifty-six acres of land on the mountain and has been active in overall conservation efforts and public access efforts. The Berlin Land Trust is also active in the conservation of Ragged Mountain and its viewshed.

In 1990, climber and ecologist Harry White wrote The Traprock Wilderness Recovery Strategy (TWRS), a plan to protect Ragged Mountain as well as the traprock range from West Peak in Meriden to Bradley Mountain in Plainville. The plan received the Governor's Green Circle Award from the Connecticut Council on Environmental Quality in 1991. Several attempts to implement the TWRS and conserve Ragged Mountain and the neighboring traprock peaks were repulsed by local pro-development political forces in Southington and New Britain, in particular. In 2000, Ragged Mountain was included in a study by the National Park Service for the designation of a new National Scenic Trail now tentatively called the New England National Scenic Trail, which would include the Metacomet-Monadnock Trail in Massachusetts and the Mattabesett Trail and Metacomet Trail trails in Connecticut.

== See also ==
- Metacomet Ridge
- The Nature Conservancy
- Rock climbing
- Metacomet Trail
- Adjacent summits:

↓ South

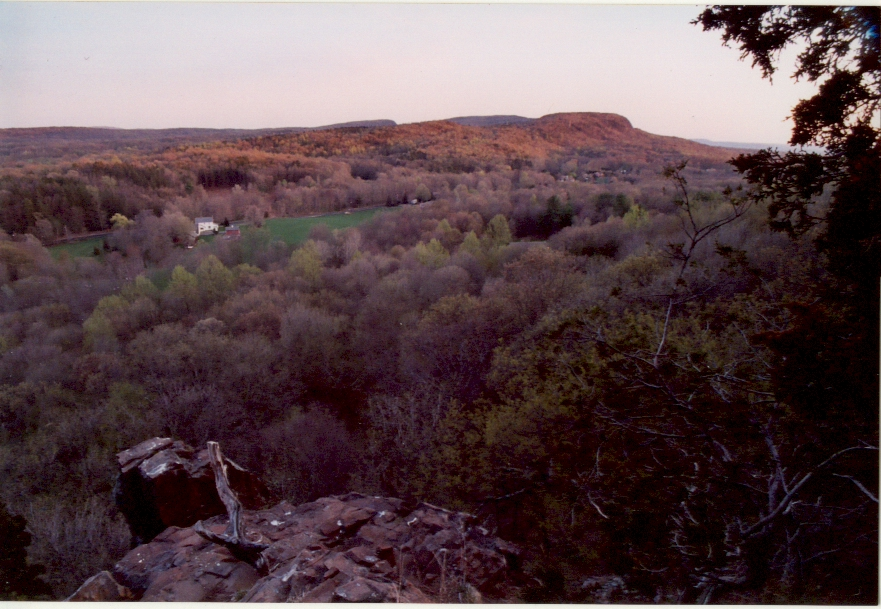
Short Mountain

North ↑
Bradley Mountain
(no image)
