= Short Mountain (Connecticut) =

Traprock Mountain in the American state of Connecticut

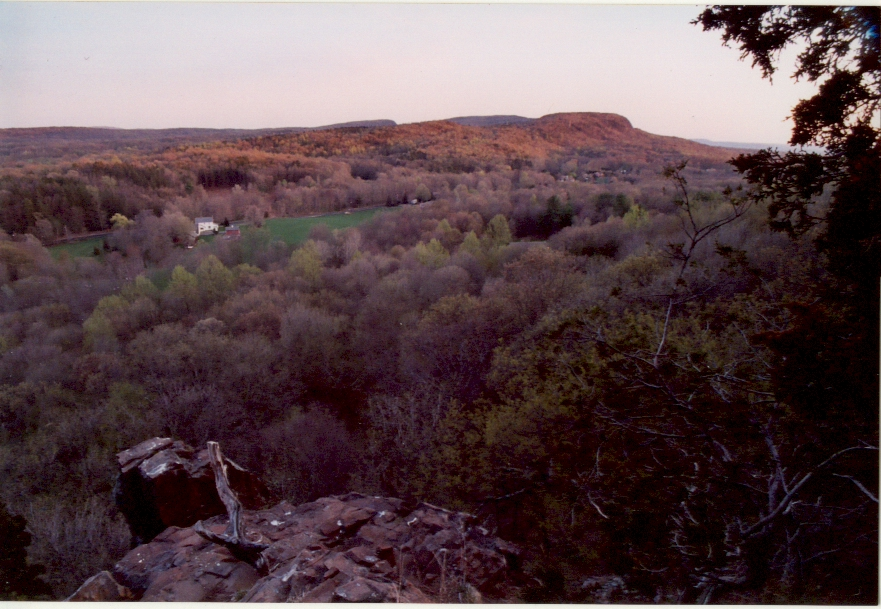
- View from Short Mountain; Hanging Hills in distance

Highest point
- Elevation: 530 ft (160 m)
- Parent peak: 41° 36' 09"N, 72° 49' 27"W
- Coordinates: 41°36′09″N 72°49′27″W

Geography
- Location: Southington and Berlin, Connecticut
- Parent range: Metacomet Ridge

Geology
- Rock age: 200 Ma
- Mountain type(s): fault-block; igneous

Climbing
- Easiest route: Metacomet Trail

Short Mountain is a traprock mountain located in south central Connecticut 5 miles (8 km) north of the city of Meriden. It is part of the narrow Metacomet Ridge that extends from Long Island Sound near New Haven, Connecticut, north through the Connecticut River Valley of Massachusetts to the Vermont border. Short Mountain is known for its scenic cliffs, unique microclimate ecosystems, and rare plant communities. It is traversed by the 51-mile (82 km) Metacomet Trail.

== Geography ==
Short Mountain, located in the towns of Southington and Berlin, Connecticut, rises steeply 200 feet (61 m) above the Quinnipiac River valley to the west and the Mattabesett River valley to the east, with a high point of 530 feet (160 m). It is roughly 1 mile (1.6 km) long by 0.5 miles (800 m) wide, although the steepness of the terrain makes the actual square mileage much larger. The Metacomet Ridge continues south from Short Mountain as the Hanging Hills and north as Ragged Mountain.

== Geology and ecology ==
Short Mountain, like much of the Metacomet Ridge, is composed of basalt, also called traprock, a volcanic rock. The mountain formed near the end of the Triassic Period with the rifting apart of the North American continent from Africa and Eurasia. Lava welled up from the rift and solidified into sheets of strata hundreds of feet thick. Subsequent faulting and earthquake activity tilted the strata, creating the cliffs and ridgeline of Short Mountain. Hot, dry upper slopes, cool, moist ravines, and mineral-rich ledges of basalt talus produce a combination of microclimate ecosystems on the mountain that support plant and animal species uncommon in greater Connecticut. Short Mountain is also a raptor migration path. (See Metacomet Ridge for more information on the geology and ecosystem of Short Mountain).

== Conservation and recreation ==
The 51 mile (80k) Metacomet Trail, (maintained by the Connecticut Forest and Park Association), traverses Short Mountain. The trail is used for hiking, snowshoeing and other passive pursuits; several outlooks provide views of the rural countryside below and the Hanging Hills to the north.

Most of the summit of Short Mountain is within conservation easement. In 2000, Short Mountain was included in a study by the National Park Service for the designation of a new National Scenic Trail now tentatively called the New England National Scenic Trail, which would include the Metacomet-Monadnock Trail in Massachusetts and the Mattabesett Trail and Metacomet Trail trails in Connecticut.

The Berlin Land Trust is active in the conservation of this section of the Metacomet Ridge.

== See also ==
- Metacomet Ridge
- Adjacent summits:

↓ South

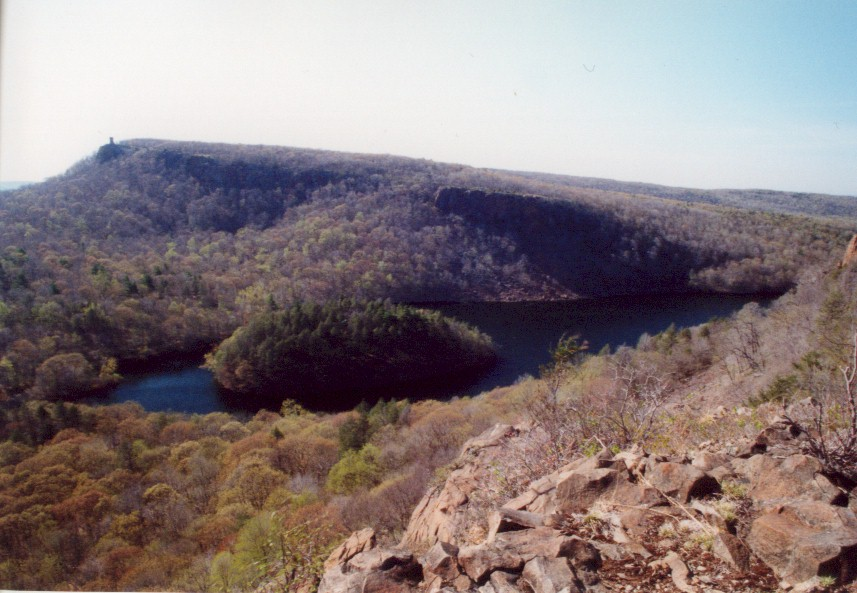
Hanging Hills

North ↑

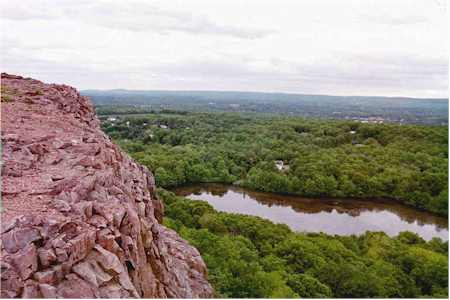
Ragged Mountain
