= Common wood sorrel =

Common wood sorrel is a common name for two plants species in the genus Oxalis. Common wood sorrel may refer to:

- Oxalis acetosella, native to Europe and Asia
- Oxalis montana, native to eastern North America
- Oxalis stricta
