= East Peak (New Haven County, Connecticut) =

Mountain in Connecticut, US

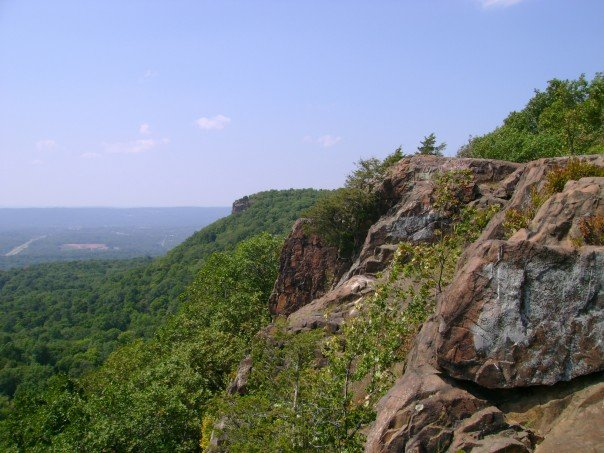
- View from East Peak.

Highest point
- Elevation: 976 ft (297 m)
- Coordinates: 41°33′27″N 72°50′14″W

Geography
- Location: Meriden, Connecticut
- Parent range: Hanging Hills / Metacomet Ridge

Geology
- Rock age: 200 million yrs.
- Mountain type(s): fault-block; igneous

Climbing
- Easiest route: Auto road

Should not be confused with East Rock, another traprock summit in Connecticut

East Peak, 976 feet (297 m), is a prominent basalt traprock mountain in the Hanging Hills of Meriden, Connecticut. Rugged and scenic, the peak rises steeply above the city of Meriden 600 feet (183 m) below and is characterized by its vertical cliffs and sweeping views of southern Connecticut and Long Island Sound. A small stone observation tower known as Castle Craig stands on the summit.

East Peak is located within the 1,800-acre (7.3 km^{2}) Hubbard Park. The 51-mile (82 km) Metacomet Trail crosses East Peak, and a seasonal auto road climbs to a small parking lot at Castle Craig. Activities enjoyed on the peak include Hiking, bicycling, and in the winter, cross-country skiing on the road. Rock climbing is only permitted for Ragged Mountain Foundation members who have obtained a permit from Meriden's parks and recreation department.

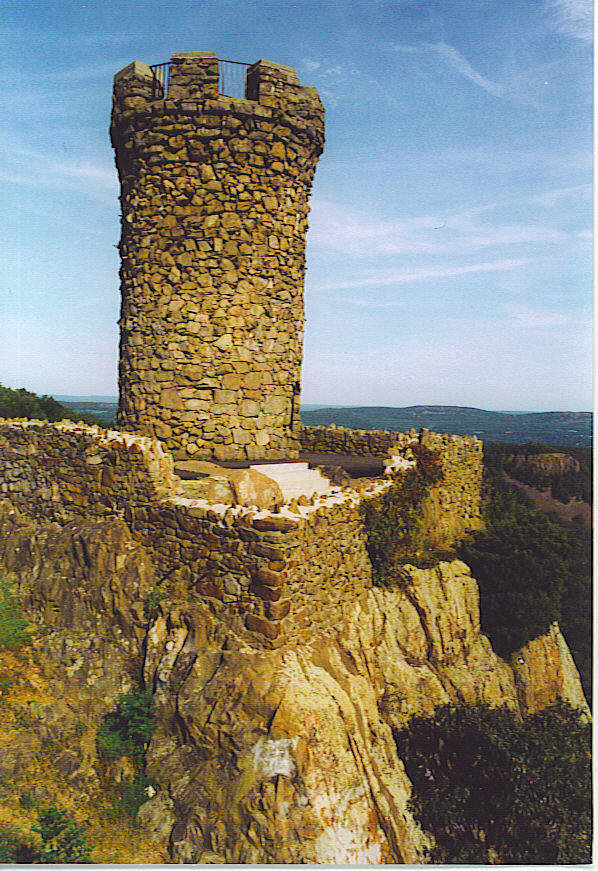
Castle Craig

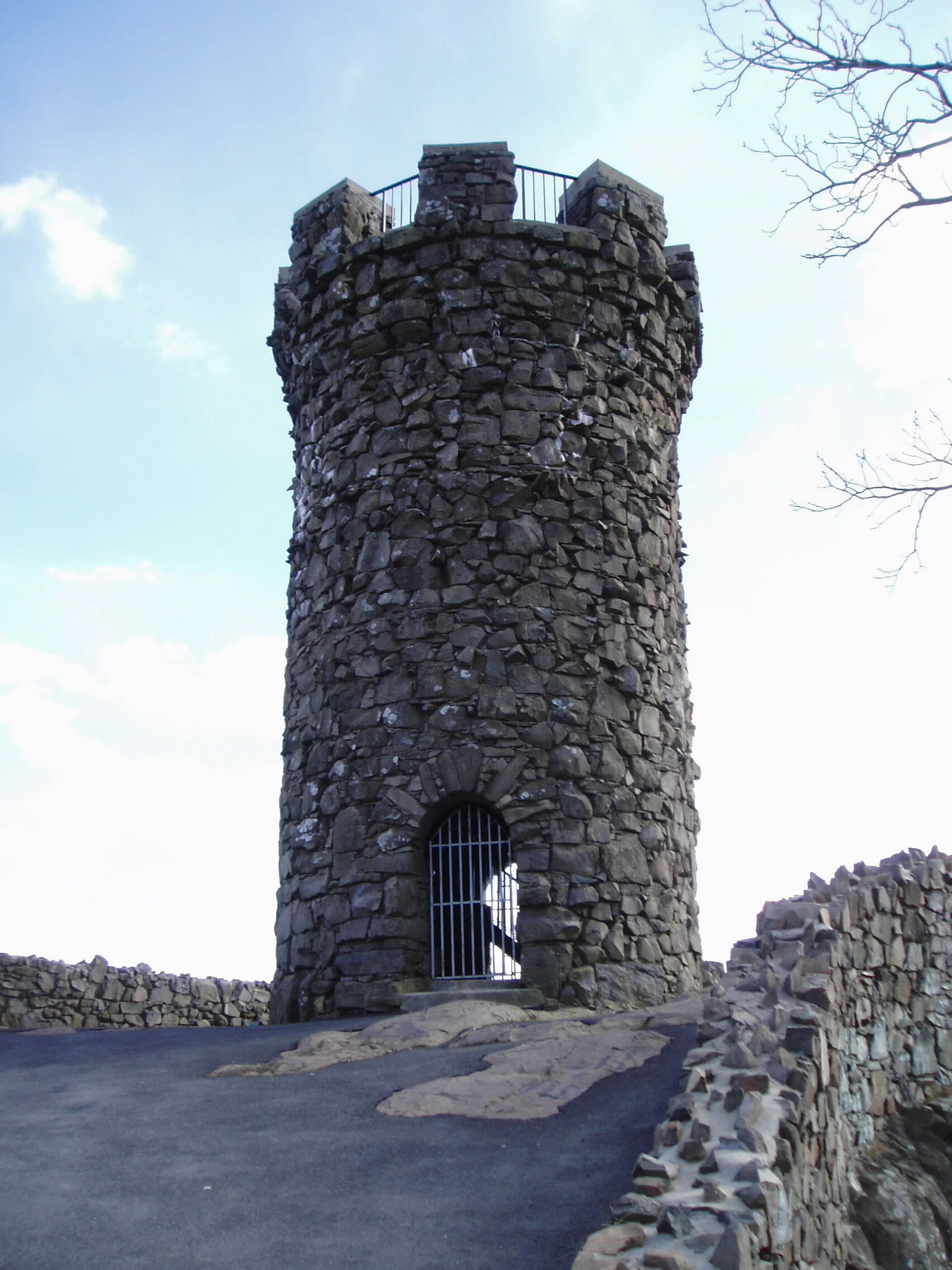
View of the lookout tower on East Peak

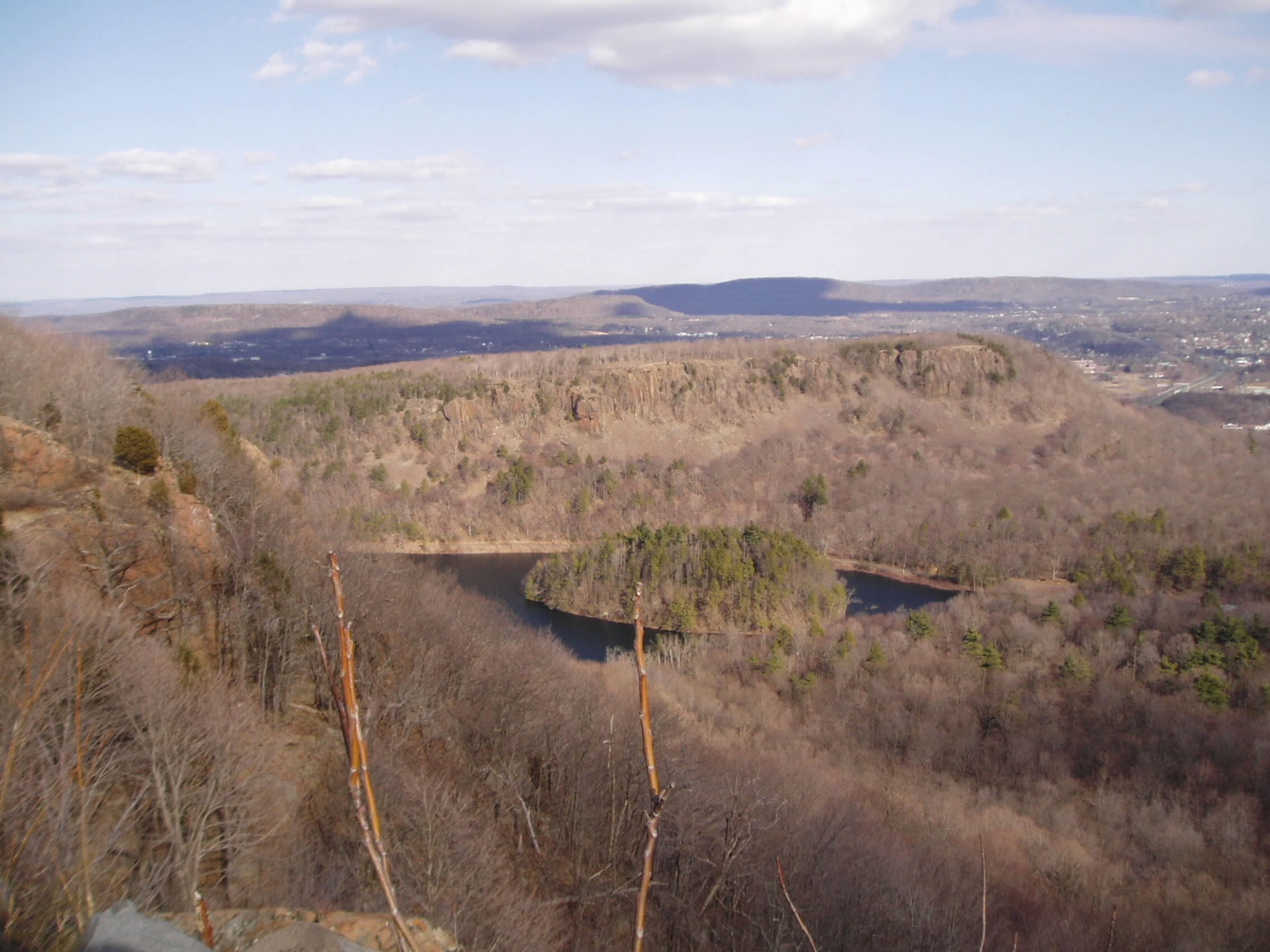

== See also ==
- Metacomet Ridge
