= Message of Fátima Movement =

The Message of Fátima Movement (Portuguese: Movimento da Mensagem de Fátima) is an association of the faithful in the Catholic Church, instituted by the Portuguese Episcopal Conference. The aim of the movement is to promote and spread the message of the apparitions of Our Lady of Fátima in 1917; to this aim, it bases its apostolic action in Portugal at the national, diocesan, and parish levels.

The superior religious guidance of the Movement is delegated on the Bishop of Leiria–Fátima, with the title of Assistant-General.

It was originally instituted on 20 April 1932, as the Pious Union "Crusaders of Our Lady of Fátima" (Pia União "Cruzados de Nossa Senhora de Fátima"). On 25 July 1984, the Portuguese Episcopal Conference approved new statutes that renamed it the "Crusaders of Fátima Movement" (Movimento dos Cruzados de Fátima). It gained its present name in 1997.
