= Meriden, Waterbury and Connecticut River Railroad =

Railroad in Connecticut (1885–1892)

Meriden, Waterbury, and Connecticut River Railroad
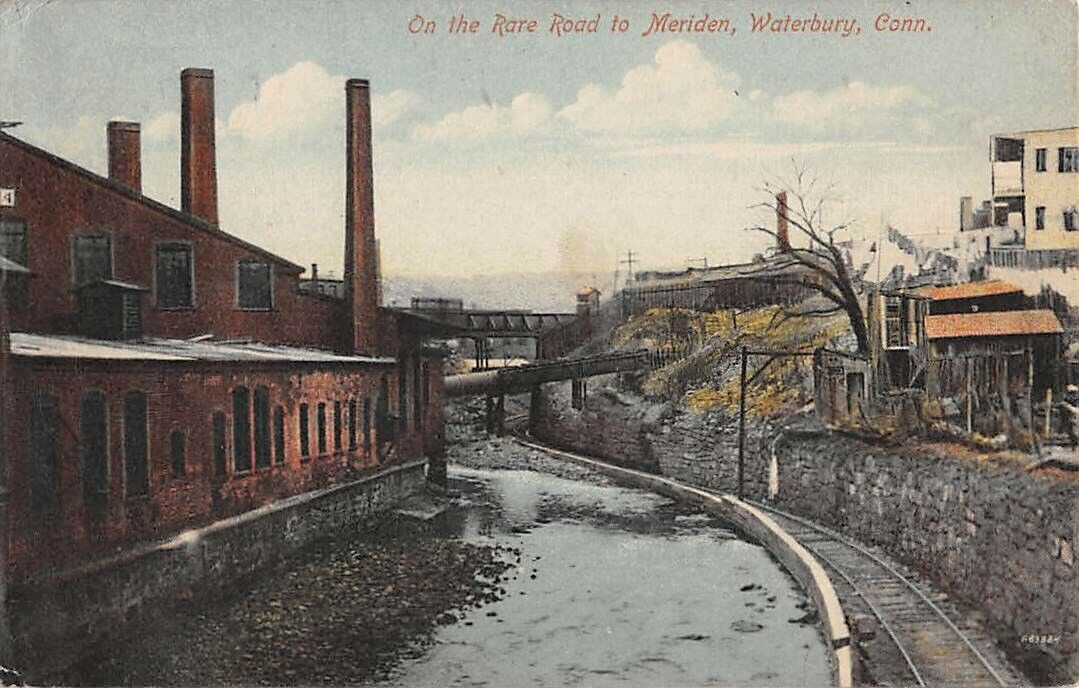
- Early-20th-century postcard view of the railroad along the Mad River in Waterbury

Overview
- Headquarters: Meriden, Connecticut, US
- Locale: Central Connecticut
- Dates of operation: 1885–1892 (operated under successors until 1994)
- Successor: New York and New England Railroad

The Meriden, Waterbury, and Connecticut River Railroad was a railroad in the US state of Connecticut. The charter, originally granted in 1871 to the Meriden and Cromwell Railroad, was obtained by Meriden residents and construction began in 1883. The line opened between the city of Meriden, Connecticut, and the Connecticut River in Cromwell, Connecticut, in 1885. An extension to Waterbury, Connecticut, was completed in 1888 as the Meriden and Waterbury Railroad, and the two companies merged to form the Meriden, Waterbury and Connecticut Railroad.

Due to high costs to reach Waterbury and existing railroad competition, the MW&CR was consistently unprofitable, and was taken over in October 1892 by the New York and New England Railroad. Following the assumption of control by the New England Railroad (a subsidiary of the New York, New Haven and Hartford Railroad, also known as the New Haven) in 1895, the line became redundant to the ex-Hartford and New Haven Railroad alignment through Meriden, and the railroad was taken out of service in 1896.

Following a threat by the state of Connecticut to revoke the railroad's charter, the New Haven returned it to service in January 1899. The easternmost portion of the line beyond Westfield, Connecticut, was abandoned in 1904. Electric trolley service ran between Meriden and Middletown via Westfield from 1907 to 1931. Passenger service on the west portion of the line ended in 1917, and in 1924 the line was abandoned between Meriden and the East Farms neighborhood of Waterbury. The eastern portion of the line was abandoned beyond a Meriden quarry in 1938.

The remaining tracks near Meriden were gradually abandoned, with all rail operations ended by 1976. The remaining MW&CR tracks in Waterbury were cut back in 1958 to make way for Interstate 84, and the final active tracks were abandoned in 1994 by Guilford Transportation Industries. Part of the railroad right-of-way in Meriden was converted to rail trails in 2007 and 2013. Further plans exist to convert more of the right-of-way into rail trails.

== History ==
=== Founding and construction ===
The Meriden, Waterbury and Connecticut River Railroad began as the Meriden and Cromwell Railroad, which was chartered in 1871 but never built. Meriden's manufacturers desired a railroad connection independent of the New York, New Haven and Hartford Railroad (the New Haven)'s ex-Hartford and New Haven Railroad, which was Meriden's sole railroad line. Meriden's citizens and industries championed the new railroad as an answer to what they felt were excessive rates charged by the New Haven. In response, the New Haven offered a 25 percent reduction in its prices to Meriden shippers, but the offer came too late to stop construction. Meriden resident Horace C. Wilcox was instrumental in organizing funding for the railroad by soliciting pledges of stock and ultimately serving as president of the project committee tasked with bringing the railroad to completion. A route for the railroad was identified and agreed upon in 1892, but before construction began an improved route with a lower construction cost was selected in May 1883.

The railroad began construction in September 1883, and ran into difficulties from Connecticut's winter weather and swampy ground near a pond along the route. The railroad began normal train service on April 6, 1885, between its Meriden depot at Center Street and docks on the Connecticut River in Cromwell, where steamboats met trains.

=== Operations and expansion to Waterbury ===
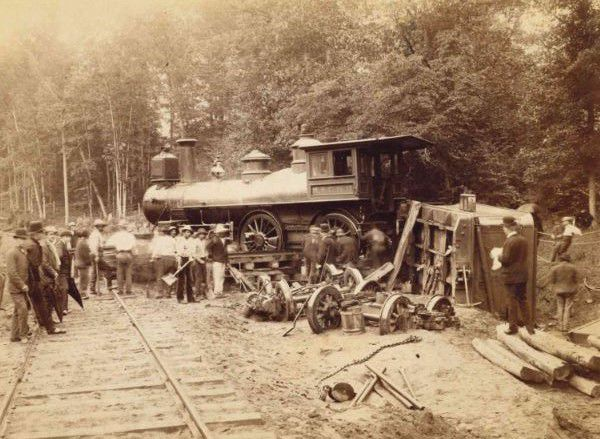
Derailment in Meriden on August 10, 1888

As an independent railroad, the Meriden and Cromwell operated a pair of passenger trains between its namesake cities, stopping at several intermediate stations, along with freight trains. Connecting service was offered to New York City and as far south as Philadelphia.

Shortly after opening, the Meriden and Cromwell Railroad decided to seek an extension to Waterbury, Connecticut, and the Meriden and Waterbury Railroad was chartered in 1887 for this purpose. Backed by $125,000 in funding from Waterbury residents, construction began the same year. The Waterbury extension was significantly more expensive than planned, in particular because the Connecticut Railroad Commission forbid any grade crossings on the route. As part of the extension, the railroad relocated the Meriden station, with the original location becoming a freight depot instead. On May 24, 1888, the Meriden and Waterbury merged with the Meriden and Cromwell to form the Meriden, Waterbury and Connecticut River Railroad.

The Waterbury extension opened as far as Dublin Street on July 4, 1888. Construction on the final section in Waterbury to connect with the New York and New England Railroad (NY&NE) began later that month and was completed early in 1889. The route of this segment along the Mad River required several substantial trestles. Passenger service was extended to the NY&NE station in Waterbury on April 5, 1889. However, the 2.6 miles (4.2 km) of rail between Dublin Street and the NY&NE stations took 17 minutes, while covering barely 1 mile (1.6 km) as the crow flies. Passenger service was cut back to Dublin Street in August 1890, with the NY&NE connection only used for freight.

In its early years, the MW&CR was the frequent scene of derailments; one such derailment on August 10, 1888, disabled its primary locomotive for several months. The bridge over the Mattabesset River east of Westfield collapsed under a train in January 1891, taking the Westfield–Cromwell section out of service for two months. By 1889, the line owned five locomotives, seven passenger cars, and 154 freight cars.

=== Successors and abandonments ===
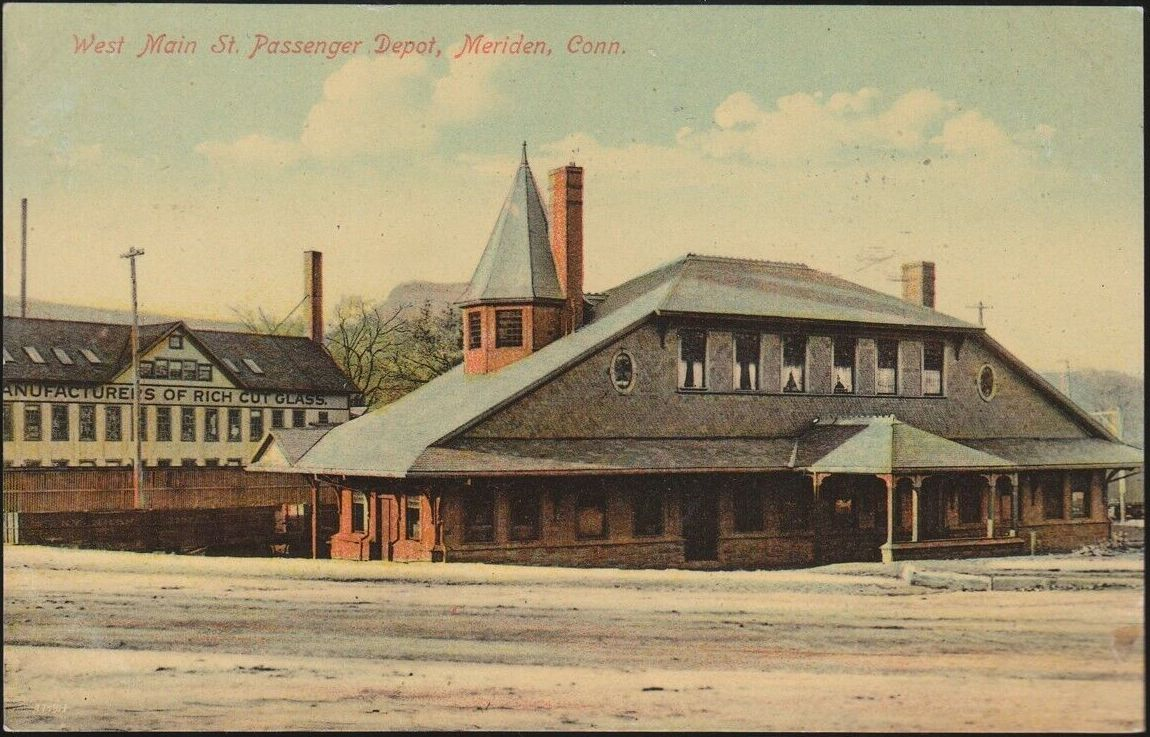
1912 postcard of West Main Street station in Meriden

Consistently unprofitable, the MW&CR was leased by the NY&NE – which was doing little better – effective October 15, 1892. The New Haven took control of the NY&NE and merged it into its New England Railroad subsidiary in 1895. This gave the New Haven control of the MW&CR, which had been created for the primary purpose of being an alternative to the New Haven. When the MW&CR's bondholders decided to foreclose on the railroad, the New England Railroad responded by shutting down the entire line on May 30, 1896. The MW&CR's idled rolling stock was taken away in October 1897, by which point the locomotives had already been sold off.

The state of Connecticut was displeased with the line's closure, and in 1898 threatened to revoke the MW&CR charter unless train operations resumed. The New Haven heeded the warning and brought back train operations in December 1898 to January 1899, after reorganizing the MW&CR as the Middletown, Meriden and Waterbury Railroad and leasing it directly. However, the eastern portion of the line between Cromwell and Westfield was not restored to service, and was abandoned in 1903. Trains instead used the Middletown Branch to reach Middletown from Westfield. In 1904, the New Haven built a connecting track to the Canal Line in Cheshire and established a Waterbury and New Haven passenger service with four daily round trips. This lasted only several years until New Haven–Waterbury streetcar service began.

In 1907, the New Haven added trolley wire to the Middletown Branch between Berlin and Middletown via Westfield, plus the ex-MW&CR between East Meriden and Westfield. Middletown–Meriden and Middletown–Berlin electric streetcar service, operated by the Connecticut Company began on July 8, 1907. Steam passenger service was discontinued between East Meriden and Westfield. After 1909, remaining steam passenger service on the ex-MW&CR was a single daily round trip between the West Main Street station in Meriden and the Dublin Street station in Waterbury. All service between Meriden and Waterbury ended on June 24, 1917, as the New Haven was short of personnel and rolling stock.

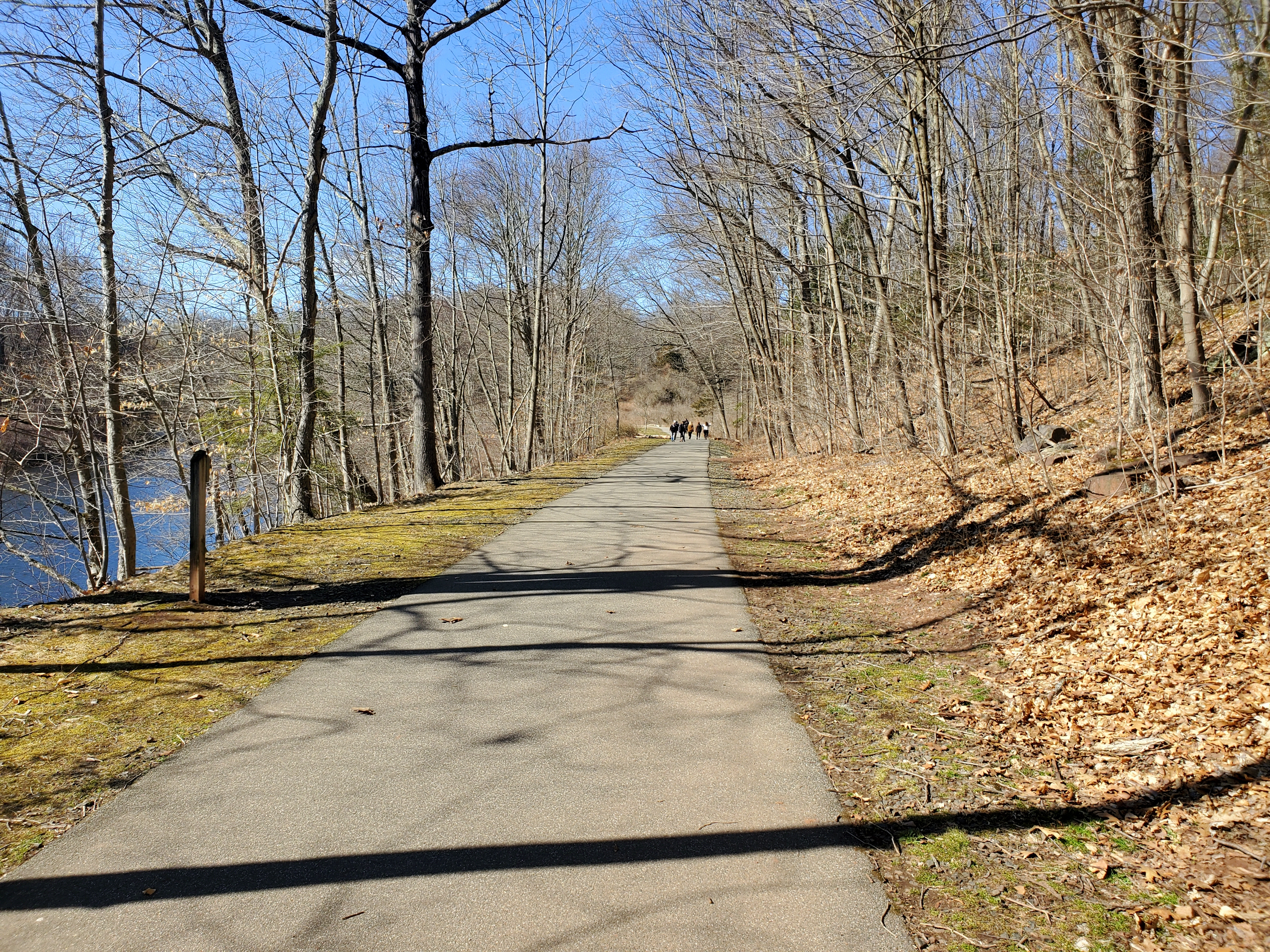
The Quinnipiac River Gorge Trail in 2023

The line between the western outskirts of Meriden and the East Farms neighborhood of Waterbury was taken out of service entirely, and ultimately abandoned in 1924, dividing the line into two discontinuous segments. Electric service was discontinued between Westfield and Middletown on December 4, 1927, and between Meriden and Westfield on September 28, 1931, ending all passenger service on the line. The eastern section of the line was abandoned between Westfield and a quarry in eastern Meriden in 1938. A further two miles (3.2 km) between downtown Meriden and the quarry were abandoned in 1969 by New Haven successor Penn Central, which took over that year. The remaining trackage in Meriden, known as the Center Street Branch, was not included in Conrail in 1976 and was instead abandoned.

The remaining trackage in Waterbury was abandoned east of near Silver Street in 1958 to facilitate construction of Interstate 84, which reused some of the right-of-way. The remaining 2.6-mile (4.2 km) section saw operation by Conrail and subsequently Guilford Transportation Industries until final abandonment in 1994, marking the end of operations anywhere on the MW&CR.

=== Rail trails ===
Several sections of the former railbed have been converted into rail trails. Two portions in southwestern Meriden are part of the Meriden Linear Trails system. The 1.3-mile (2.1 km) Quinnipiac River Gorge Trail runs along the Quinnipiac River between the Red Bridge and the Cheshire town line. It opened in December 2006, though formal dedication was not until November 3, 2007. The connecting 1.1-mile (1.8 km) Hanover Pond Trail opened in October 2013. A 0.5-mile (0.8 km) section of rail trail along Highland Pond in southwestern Middletown is part of the Mattabesett Trail. Plans exist to turn much of the remaining railroad right-of-way into trails.

== Route ==
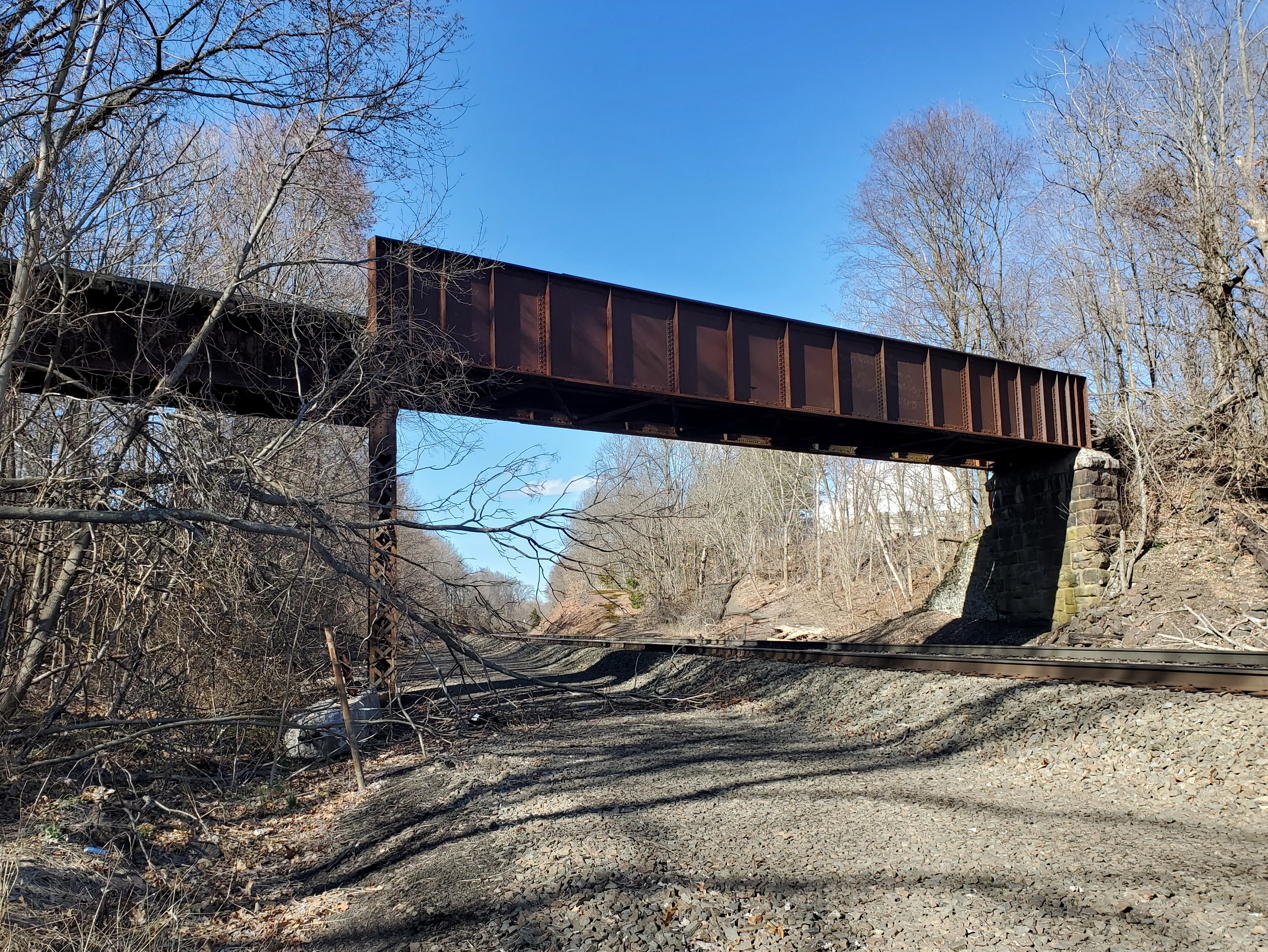
The abandoned bridge over the New Haven–Springfield Line at Quarry Junction, seen in 2023

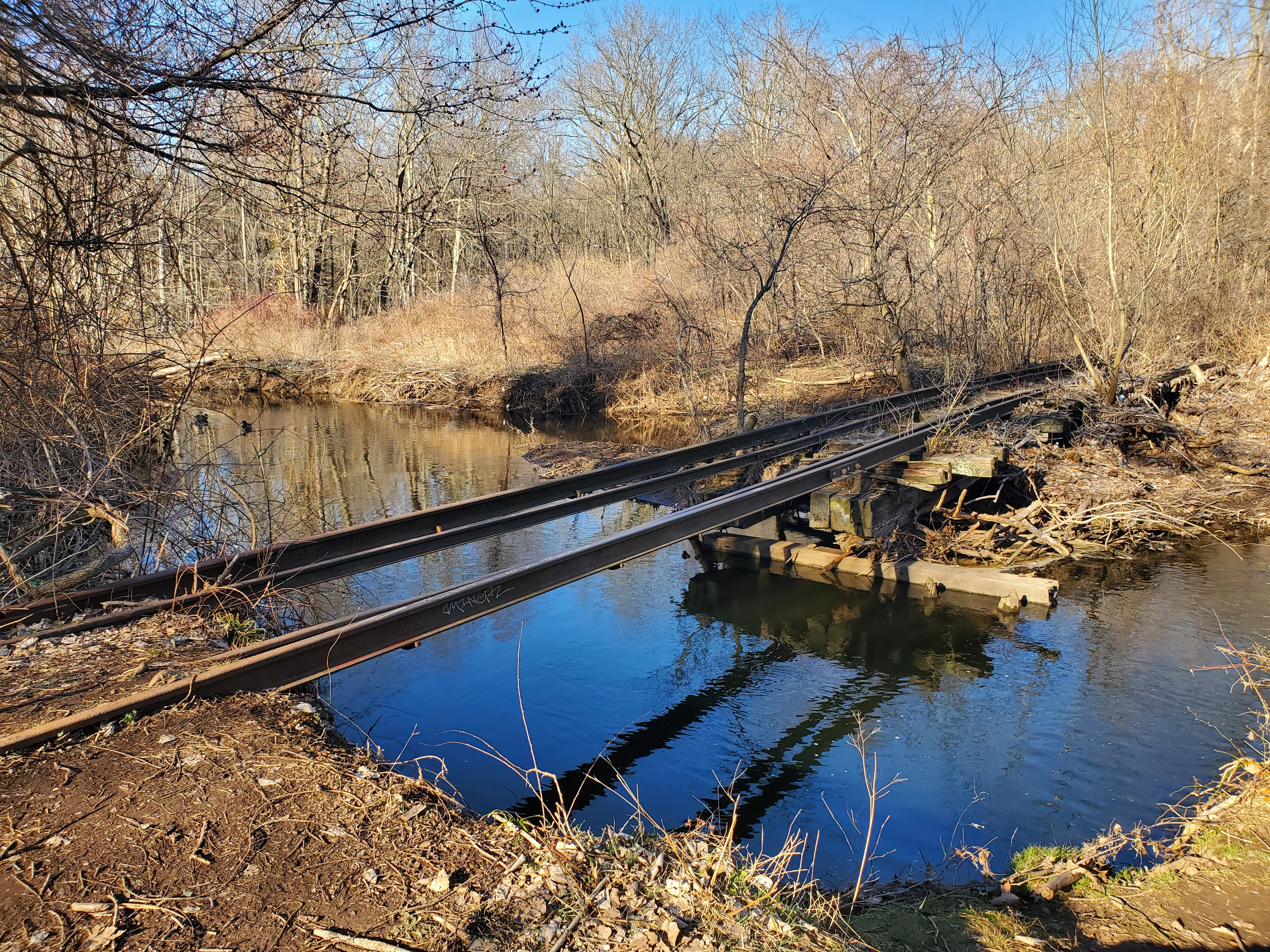
A destroyed wooden bridge east of Meriden

The line was 30.2 miles (48.6 km) long, running roughly east-west. It split from the NY&NE mainline south of downtown Waterbury, turning east and crossing over the Naugatuck Railroad mainline and the Mad River, then turning north and crossing the river twice in quick succession. It continued east along the Mad River and Beaver Pond Brook valleys, then climbed southeast into the hills. Descending, the line crossed the west ridgeline of the Metacomet Ridge between Mount Sanford and Peck Mountain. It crossed over the Canal Line on a bridge in Cheshire. In northeast Cheshire, it crossed the Quinnipiac River, then followed its north bank into Meriden. The line's Meriden station was at West Main Street, about 3/4 mile (1.2 km) west of the city's main station.

The line crossed over the New Haven–Springfield Line at Quarry Junction in northern Meriden, with a steep connecting track between them. Continuing northeast into Middletown, it crossed under the Middletown Branch at Westfield, then over the Mattabesset River into Cromwell. After crossing the Valley Line in Cromwell, it turned north along the Connecticut River waterfront to the terminal. The line's only branch was the Meriden and Cromwell Railroad's original Meriden entry, which was retained for freight use after the Waterbury extension opened. About 0.85 miles (1.37 km) long, it southwest from East Meriden station to Center Street. The 1907–1931 streetcar service used part of the branch to reach street trackage on Pratt Street.

=== Stations ===
Location	Station	Miles (km)	Connecting lines
Waterbury	Waterbury	0.0 (0.0)	Naugatuck Railroad, New York and New England Railroad, Watertown Branch
Waterbury	Waterbury (Dublin Street)	2.6 (4.2)	
Waterbury	East Farms	5.9 (9.5)	
Cheshire	East Summit	7.5 (12.1)	
Prospect	Prospect	9.6 (15.4)	
Cheshire	West Cheshire	10.9 (17.5)	
Cheshire	Southington Road	12.9 (20.7)	
Meriden	East Hanover	16.2 (26.0)	
Meriden	Hanover Park	16.8 (27.1)	
Meriden	Meriden (West Main Street)	17.9 (28.9)	
Meriden	East Meriden	20.4 (32.8)	
Middletown	Highland	23.5 (37.8)	
Middletown	Smiths	25.2 (40.6)	
Middletown	Westfield	27.0 (43.4)	Middletown Branch
Cromwell	West Cromwell	28.0 (45.0)	
Cromwell	Cromwell	30.2 (48.6)	
