= Meriden, Connecticut =

City in Connecticut, United States

- City
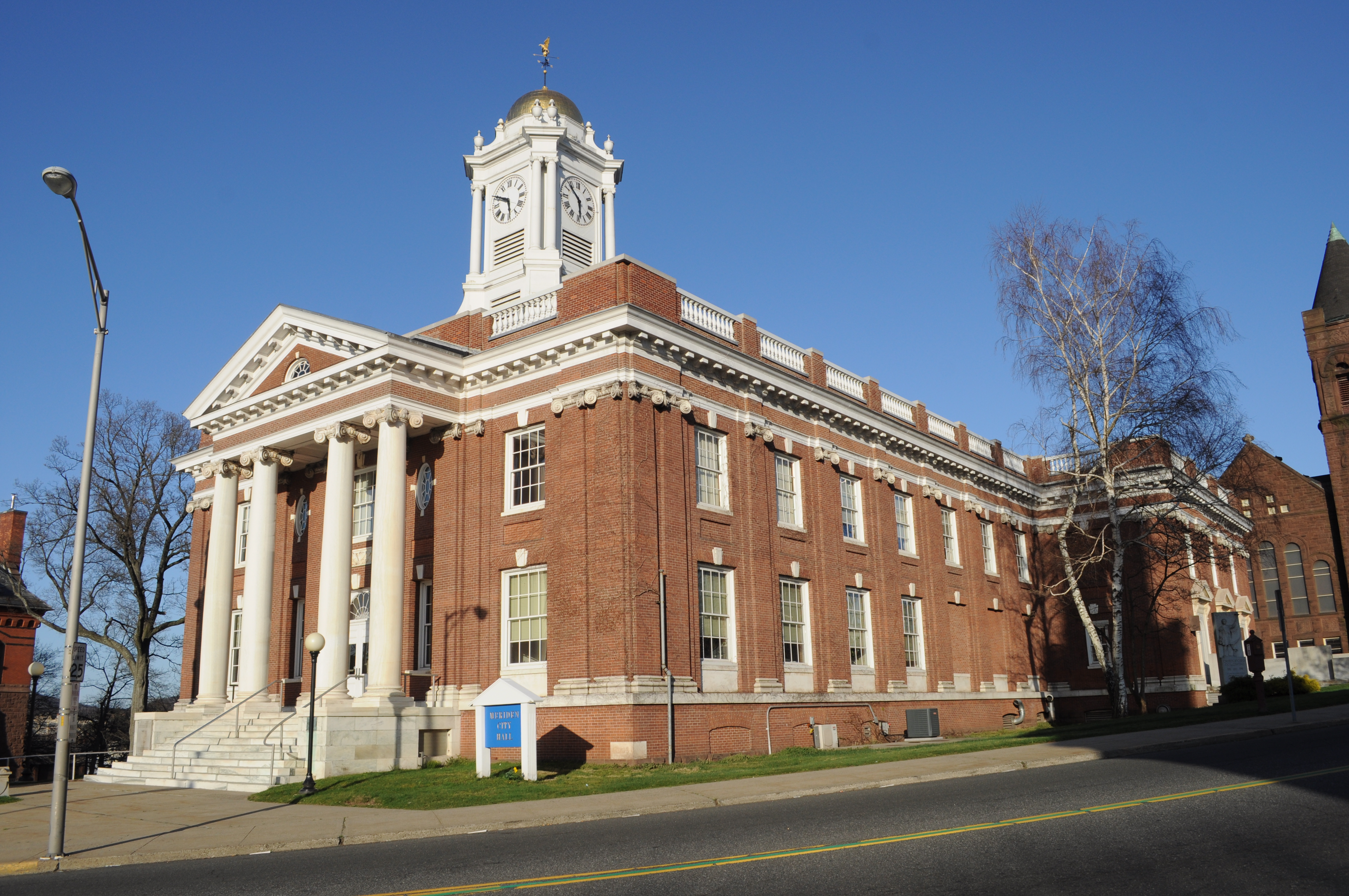
- City Hall, Meriden

- Seal
- Nickname: The Silver City
- Interactive map of Meriden, Connecticut
- Coordinates: 41°32′12″N 72°47′41″W
- Country: United States
- U.S. state: Connecticut
- County: New Haven
- Region: South Central CT
- Incorporated (town): 1806
- Incorporated (city): 1867
- Consolidated: 1922

Government
  - Type: Council-manager
  - City Manager: Brian Daniels
  - City Leaders: List of CLs: Kevin M. Scarpati (U), Mayor; Bruce A. Fontanella (D), Dep. Mayor; Sonya Jelks (D), Majority Leader; Larue A. Graham (D), Dep. Maj. Leader; Chad Cardillo (D), Dep. Maj. Leader; Michael Zakrzewski (R), Minority Leader; Michael Carabetta (R), Dep. Min. Leader; Yvette Cortez (D); John Hauselt (D); Diadette Hernandez (D); Kirsten Misner (D); Joseph Scaramuzzo (D); Sarah Taylor (D)

Area
  - Total: 24.16 sq mi (62.58 km^{2})
  - Land: 23.80 sq mi (61.64 km^{2})
  - Water: 0.36 sq mi (0.94 km^{2})
- Elevation: 177 ft (54 m)

Population (2020)
  - Total: 60,850
  - Density: 2,557/sq mi (987.2/km^{2})
- Time zone: UTC– 05:00 (Eastern)
  - Summer (DST): UTC– 04:00 (Eastern)
- ZIP Codes: 06450–06451
- Area codes: 203/475
- FIPS code: 09-46450
- GNIS feature ID: 0208834
- Airport: Meriden Markham Airport
- Website: www.meridenct.gov

Meriden (/ˈmɛərədɪn/ MAIR-ə-din) is a city in New Haven County, Connecticut, United States, located halfway between the regional cities of New Haven and Hartford. The city is part of the South Central Connecticut Planning Region. In 2020, the population of the city was 60,850.

== History ==
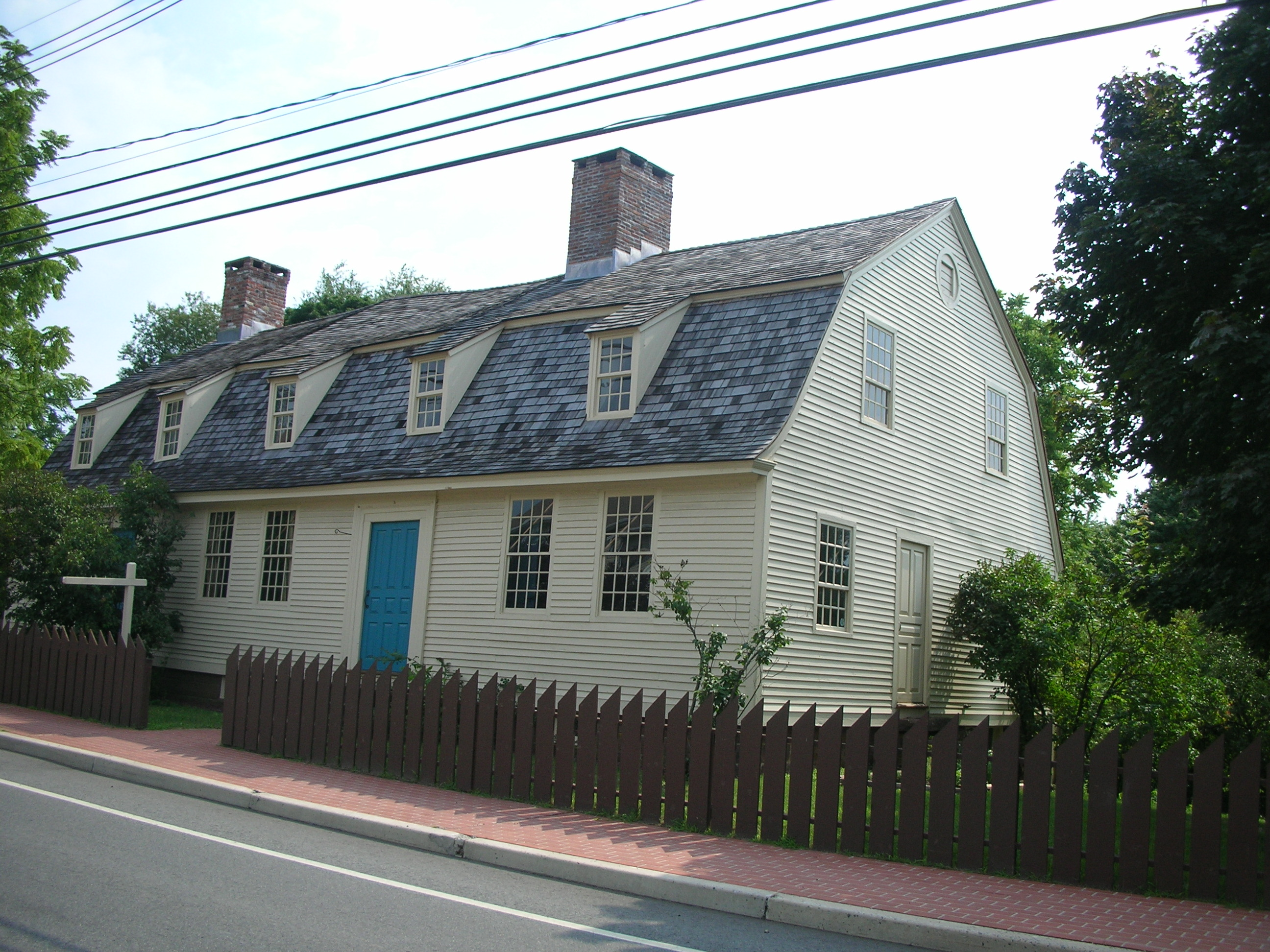
Solomon Goffe House

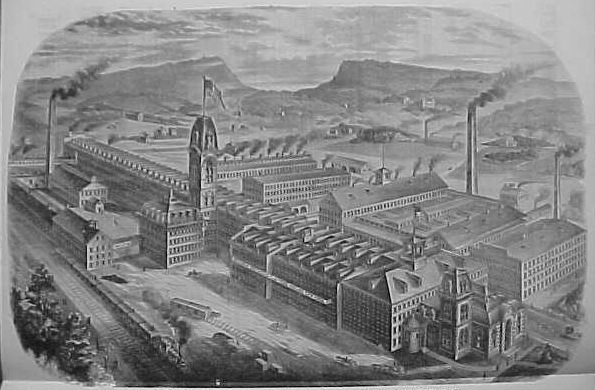
Meriden Britannia electro-gold and silverplating factory, 1881

=== 18th century ===
Meriden was originally a part of the neighboring town of Wallingford. It was granted a separate meetinghouse in 1727, became a town in 1806 with over 1,000 residents. Meriden was incorporated as a city in 1867, with just under 9,000 residents. It was once proposed as the Connecticut state capital. It was named for the village of Meriden, West Midlands, England, near Birmingham.

The oldest house in town, the Solomon Goffe House, was built by Solomon Goffe in 1711, and became a museum in 1986.

The grave of Winston Churchill's great-great-great maternal grandfather, Timothy Jerome, can be seen today at what is now called "Burying Ground 1720" (Google Maps: 41.522877°N 72.787707°W) at the juncture of Dexter Avenue and Lydale Place. At the time the location was known as "Buckwheat Hill", and overlooked the salt-making estate for which Jerome had received a royal grant. Timothy Jerome's son, Samuel, is the great-great-grandfather of Jennie Jerome, Winston Churchill's mother.

=== 19th century to World War II ===
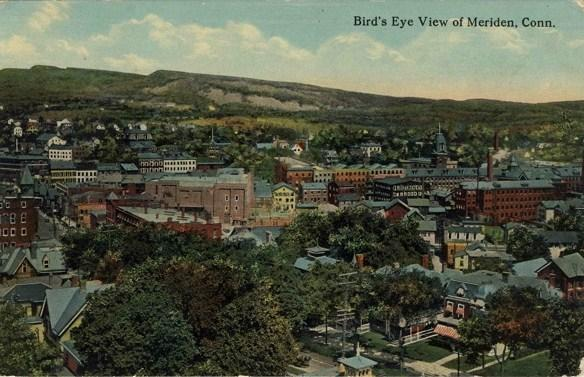
Meriden, c. 1914

In the second half of the 1800s, Meriden became a manufacturing center of note, with several companies forming, or relocating to the city, involved in the production of mainly silver, lamps and metalware, glassware, guns, and musical instruments. A substantial number of design and technology patents were secured.

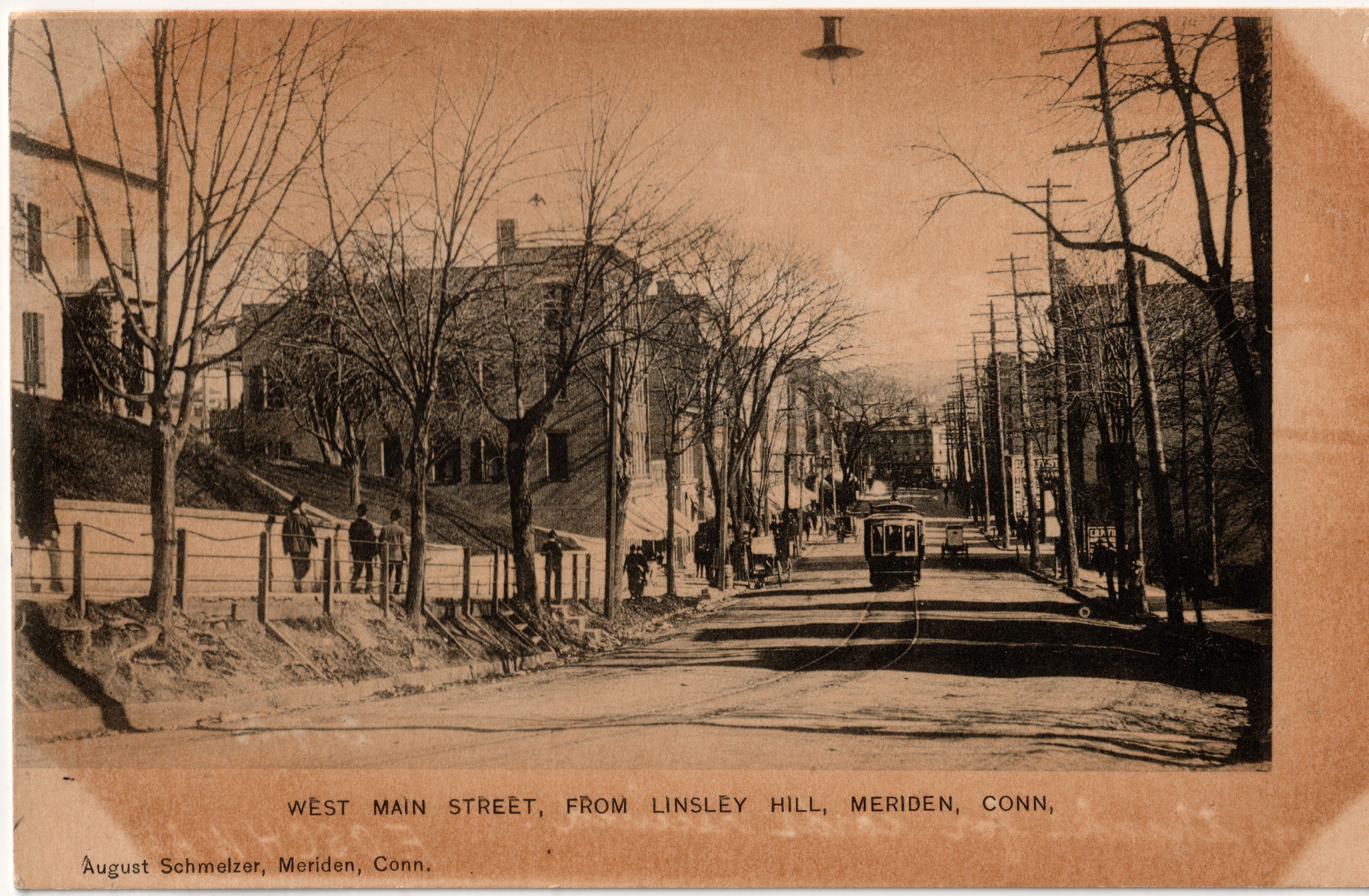
West Main Street from Linsley Hill, Meriden, Conn

==== Silver and cutlery ====
For silver, the numerous companies included the Meriden Britannia Company (a predecessor of the International Silver Company with corporate HQ in Meriden), Meriden earned the nickname "Silver City", due to the large number of silver manufacturers, and the International Silver Co. continued production until the early 1980s. Along with the silver companies, other producers of cutlery included the Meriden Cutlery Co. and Miller Bros. Cutlery.

In 1876, the Meriden Britannia Company made significant efforts at the Centennial Exposition in Philadelphia, and won the First place medal for plated wares. According to the Sotheby's auction house, "The publicity of the award and the impression the firm made on the fair's 8 million visitors was continued by the catalogues and other intensive marketing; by the end of the 1870s Meriden Britannia Co. was considered the largest silverware company in the world." A key design attributed to launching the company and the town's international name was the Buffalo Hunt with a smaller edition in the White House collection, Washington, DC. For some time the original Buffalo Hunt sculpture went missing, and in a shocking report by Bailey Wright in 2018, it was learned that it was recently 'missing' actually in Meriden.

==== Lamps and metalware ====
For lamps and metalware, the companies with national and international markets included the Edward Miller & Co / Miller Company (1844–stopped manufacturing lighting c. 1980), the Charles Parker Company, Handel Company, and the Bradley & Hubbard Manufacturing Company (1852–1940), which also was widely known for producing metal-based products like decorative tables and andirons.

==== Glassware ====
For glassware, the companies included the C.F. Monroe Company (1892–1916). and the Meriden Flint Glass Company (1876–1892),

==== Kitchen appliances and guns ====
Manning, Bowman & Co. (1849–1945) centered its production in Meriden, and into the early 20th century became a nationally known producer of small electrical appliances and chrome ware. Meriden was also the site of the production of Parker Brothers (guns), widely-known and traded by firearms enthusiasts. From 1905 to 1918, the Meriden Firearms Co. manufactured small arms from 1905 to 1918. The stock was owned by Sears, Roebuck & Company.

==== Musical instruments including player pianos ====
Internationally known companies Wilcox and White and the Aeolian Company were involved in the production of musical instruments north of the downtown area at Tremont and Cambridge Streets. The Aeolian Company grew quickly forming production sites in other places and developed a music hall in New York. (The largest holder today of instruments and music rolls by the two companies is the Pianola Museum in Amsterdam, the Netherlands.)

==== Graphic arts innovation ====
Meriden also was an important site for graphic arts innovation. In 1888, the Meriden Gravure Company (in Meriden 1888–1989) was founded by Charles Parker and James F. Allen, and continued a previous printing operation by Parker. The company developed an expertise in high quality image reproduction, which initially was driven by the needs of the silver industry.

With the wealth of entrepreneurs during this time, several mansions and houses of note were built, particularly on Broad Street.

Of political and historical note, on March 7, 1860, Abraham Lincoln spoke in Meriden seeking the Republican presidential nomination.

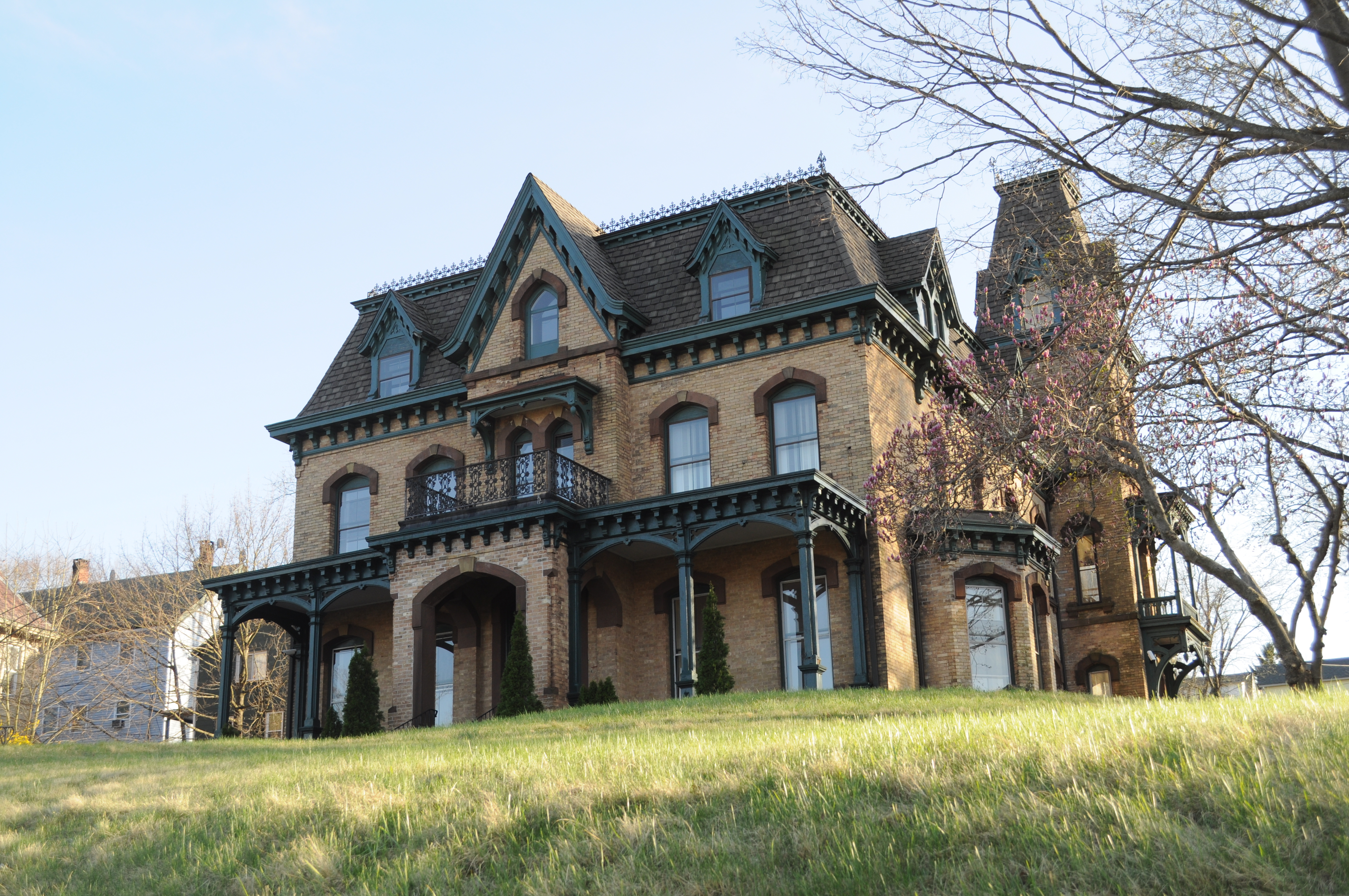
Isaac C. Lewis mansion (1868). Since 1950, the building has been used for other purposes. Since 2012, it has been a mosque.

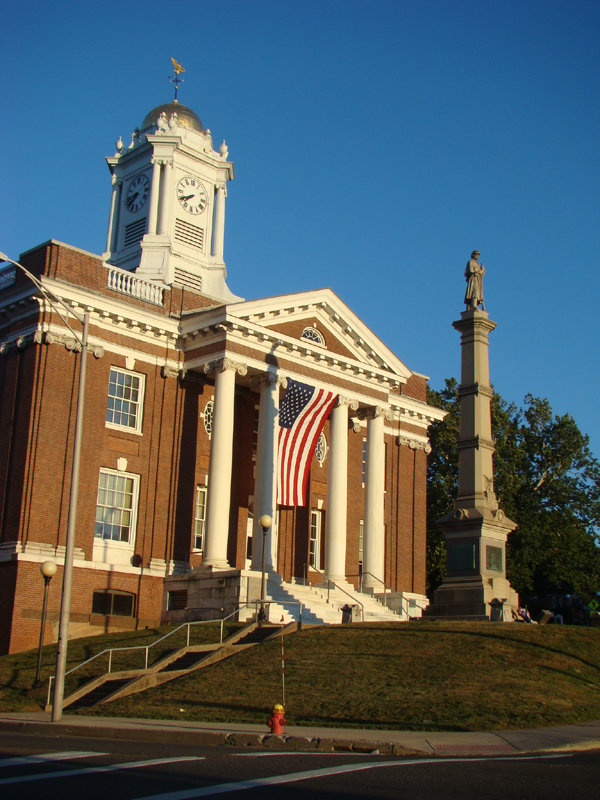
Meriden City Hall (1907) with Civil War monument in the foreground. This building replaced two previous designs (1869–1889 and 1889–1904, the latter destroyed by fire).

For public places, Hubbard Park in the Hanging Hills was financed by Walter Hubbard (of the Bradley & Hubbard company). The design for the park was originally conceived by Hubbard in consultation with the Olmsted Brothers, sons of Frederick Law Olmsted, America's foremost landscape architect. In 1900, Castle Craig on a peak was dedicated in the park. In 1903, the Curtis Memorial Library, across from Meriden's city hall, was opened.

==== Hollywood connection (1937–1950) ====
From 1937 until 1947, the International Silver Company sponsored the Silver Theater, a national radio program broadcast via CBS in Hollywood. The radio program featured many Hollywood actors and actresses of the time like Jimmy Stewart and Rosalind Russell. Over 200 programs were produced. In c. 1937–1945, several Hollywood stars, including Judy Garland, Ginger Rogers and Barbara Stanwyck, endorsed the company's 1847 Rogers Bros. silverware in print advertisements in LIFE magazine.

After World War II, in 1949–1950, The Silver Theatre was brought to television and broadcast on CBS, also with the International Silver Company as the sponsor. Guest stars included Eva Gabor, Kim Hunter, and Burgess Meredith.

==== Legacy of Meriden's grand manufacturing era ====
A few thousand designs from this manufacturing era from Meriden are in museums and historical societies across the United States and into Europe, Australia and New Zealand. Design objects from this era from Meriden have also been included in over 200 national and international exhibitions and expositions since the 1850s. The 1930s tea urn by Eliel Saarinen for the Wilcox Silver Plate Co. / International Silver Company, Meriden, is the one design exhibited most and most published in design books as an international Modern design icon.

Some comparatively recent examples of Meriden designs in exhibitions include In pursuit of Beauty: Americans and the Aesthetic Movement at the Metropolitan Museum of Art in New York (1986–1987), and more recently, Modernism in American Silver: 20th century design (2005–2006) in Dallas, Miami Beach, and Washington, DC, which highlighted downtown Meriden and the area's role as an important center of Modernist silver production. In 19th century Modern (2011–2012) in Brooklyn, designs by the International Silver Company and the Napier Company, another Meriden manufacturer, were exhibited. In November 2016 – November 2017, the city's iconic Napier penguin cocktail shaker was in an exhibition at the Dallas Museum of Art; the Napier penguin was the lead image of the show.

In summer 2017 alone, historical Meriden area design was exhibited in museum shows in at least Dallas, Newark, at the Museum of Modern Art in New York, the Cooper-Hewitt Smithsonian Museum in New York, the Gemeentemuseum in The Hague, The Netherlands, and the KunstHalle in Berlin, Germany.

With this level of attention, some special design objects from the era have become sought-after collector's items also at auction, sometimes due to their association with the commission or commissioner, or the status of the design, or being in the sought-after Modernism style. For example, a painted glass and metal table lamp by Bradley and Hubbard, (c. 1920) sold for US$14,950, doubling its estimate, at Christie's auction house in New York in 1999. Later, a 14-inch, International Silver Company cocktail shaker (c. 1927) sold for US$21,600 tripling its estimate, at Christie's in New York in 2005. A Parker gun made for a Russian czar before World War I, but never delivered, was reported to have been sold for US$287,500 in 2007. In 2008, a rare Handel lamp sold for US$85,000. On March 5–6, 2014 at Sotheby's in London, "Al Capone's cocktail shaker" made by the Meriden International Sterling Company (c. 1932) achieved over 33 times its estimate with a sale price of GBP50,000 (US$83,250 on the day). Lastly, in 2014, at Sotheby's New York, a rare Paul Lobel-designed coffee service (c. 1934–1935) produced by the Wilcox Silver Plate Co. / International Silver Company sold for US$377,000.

=== WWII–1970s ===
In 1939, Edwin Howard Armstrong, a network radio pioneer who invented FM radio, used West Peak in 1939 for the location of one of the first FM radio broadcasts. His original 70-foot-tall (21 m) radio mast still stands on the peak. Currently West Peak is home to six FM broadcast stations, including WNPR, WWYZ, WKSS, WDRC-FM, WMRQ-FM and WHCN.

During World War II, factories in Meriden worked round-the-clock in three shifts. On March 8, 1944, the War Manpower Commission gave Meriden the designation as "National Ideal War Community", and Jimmy Durante and Glenn Miller entertained those at the ceremony.

In addition to manufacturers that continued operations after World War II, starting in the later 1940s, the Miller Company, Burton Tremaine, Sr. and Emily Hall Tremaine firmly put Meriden on the international, 20th century art/design map. In December 1947, Meriden became known once again as a site of design innovation, then with Modern art, via the Miller Company Collection of Abstract Art and the organization of a Painting toward architecture exhibition which opened at Hartford's Wadsworth Atheneum and later travelled to venues in 27 venues across the United States (1947–52). Substantial national media coverage reported on the exhibition. Painting toward architecture is considered one of the important art-design-architecture crossover exhibitions of the 20th century, tabling European influences for usage in the Post-World War II United States. In the 1950s, the Miller Company Collection of Abstract Art was privatized to "Mr & Mrs Burton Tremaine, Meriden, CT" and numerous artworks were lent to hundreds of exhibitions nationally and internationally into the 1970s with this designation.

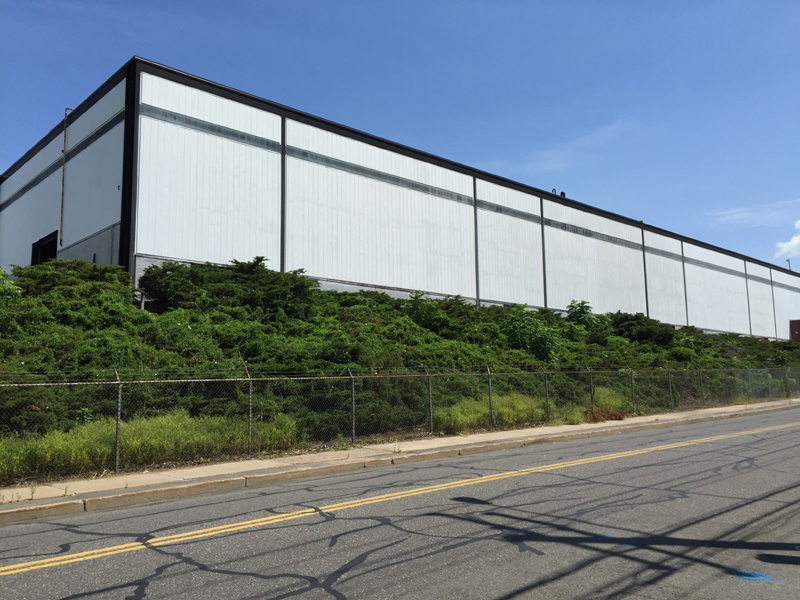
Black-and-white Modernist facade of the Miller Company addition, designed by Philip Johnson, built in 1965.

In 1965, the Miller Company addition on Center Street was completed. The black-and-white Modernist facade was designed by influential American architect Philip Johnson.

On April 27, 1976, Jimmy Carter campaigned at city hall and the Latin American Society for the nomination of the Democratic Party for President of the United States.

=== 1980s–present ===
In 1981, the Ku Klux Klan was present in Meriden, holding various rallies in the first half of the year. At a March 21, 1981, rally, where the KKK was showing support for a police officer who killed a Black person, protestors threw rocks at the KKK, spurring the Connecticut State Police to protect the Klan from anti-Klan protestors. Two protesters were injured.

In 1987, the Emily Hall Tremaine Foundation was founded by the noted art collector that partly worked in Meriden, before her death, with three focus areas: learning disabilities, the arts, and the environment. The offices were located in downtown Meriden. In c. 2010, the foundation offices were relocated to New Haven, near Yale University.

The Franciscan Sisters of the Eucharist have their mother house in Meriden, as do the Franciscan Brothers of the Eucharist. The headquarters of Eastern Mountain Sports is located in Meriden.

== Geography ==
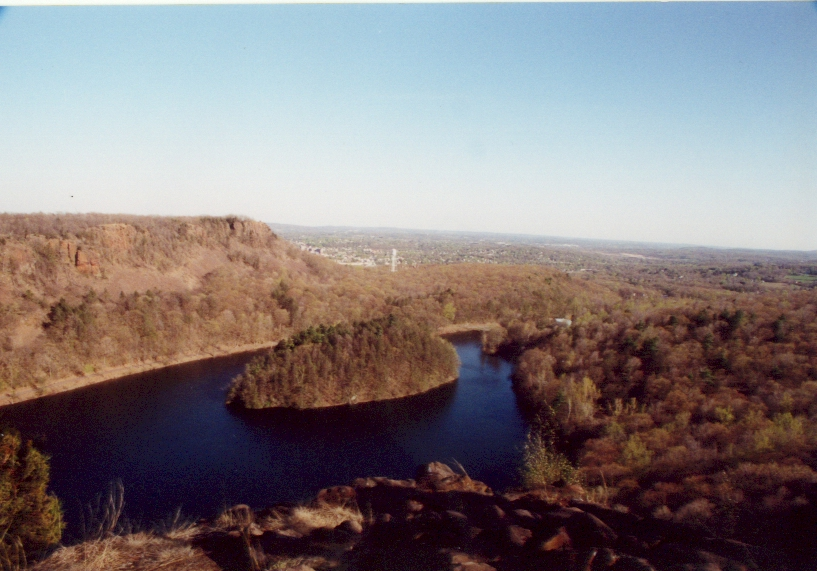
The Hanging Hills and Hubbard Park, and Meriden below (2003)

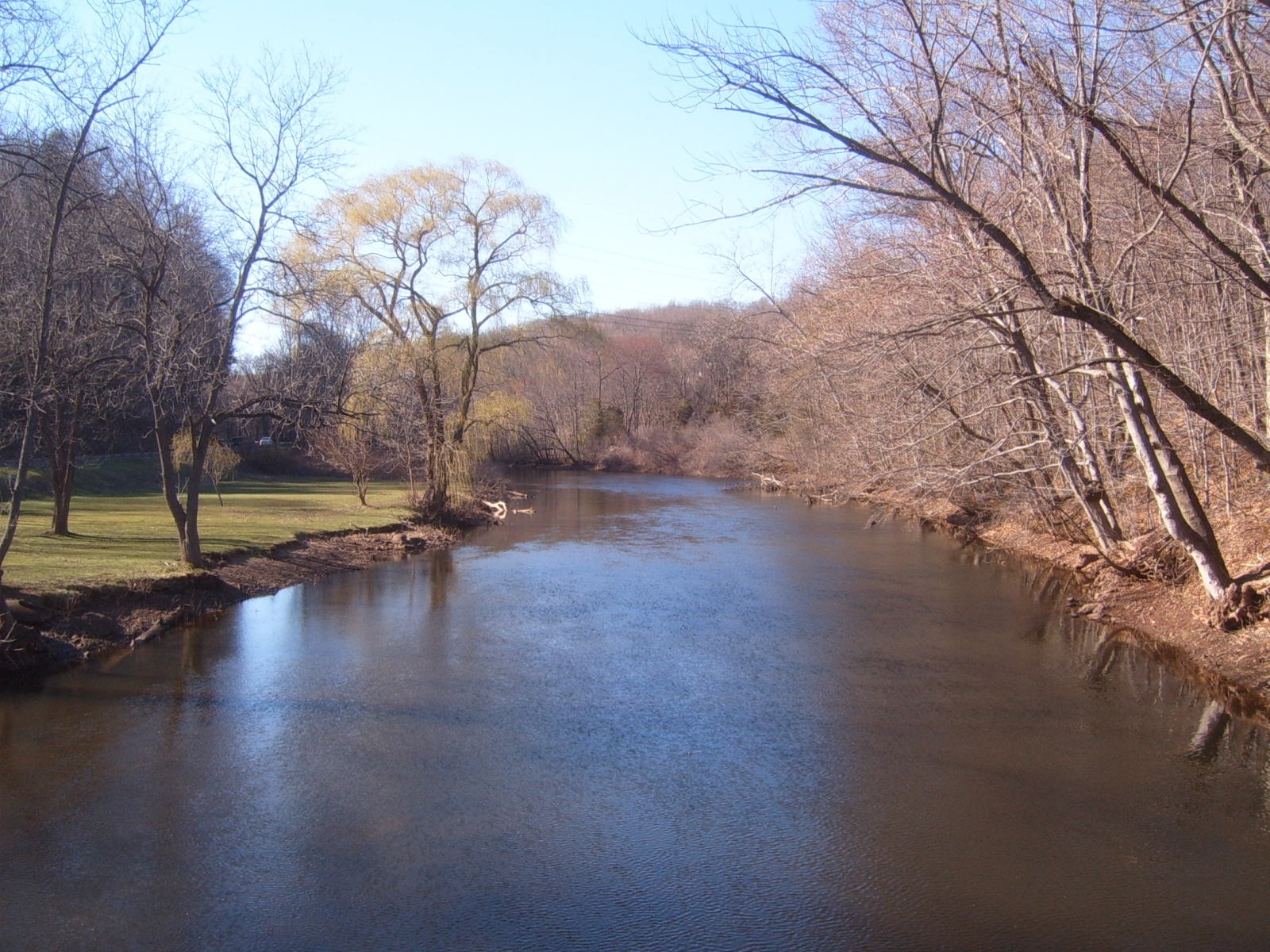
The Quinnipiac River as it winds through the Quinnipiac River Gorge in South Meriden

According to the United States Census Bureau, the city has a total area of 24.1 square miles (62.5 km^{2}), of which 23.8 square miles (61.5 km^{2}) is land and 0.4 square miles (1.0 km^{2}), or 1.66%, is water.

Meriden is a showcase for a number of prominent peaks of the Metacomet Ridge, a mountainous trap rock ridgeline that stretches from Long Island Sound to nearly the Vermont border. Notable peaks in Meriden include the Hanging Hills (West Peak, East Peak, South Mountain, and Cathole Mountain); Lamentation Mountain, Chauncey Peak, and Besek Mountain. Castle Craig, a city landmark for over a century, was constructed among the Hanging Hills in Hubbard Park.

The Quinnipiac River courses through the southwest quadrant of the city, known to area residents as "South Meriden", where it meanders through a gorge lined with several exposed sandstone and brownstone cliffs. Harbor Brook (originally named Pilgrim Harbor Brook) cuts through the town from the northeast to the southwest before emptying into Hanover Pond, an impoundment on the Quinnipiac River in South Meriden.

=== Principal communities ===
- Meriden Center
- South Meriden

== Demographics ==
Historical population
Census	Pop.	Note	%±
1820	1,309		—
1870	8,893		—
1880	15,540		74.7%
1890	21,652		39.3%
1900	24,296		12.2%
1910	27,265		12.2%
1920	29,867		9.5%
1930	38,481		28.8%
1940	39,494		2.6%
1950	44,088		11.6%
1960	51,850		17.6%
1970	55,959		7.9%
1980	57,118		2.1%
1990	59,479		4.1%
2000	58,244		−2.1%
2010	60,868		4.5%
2020	60,850		0.0%
U.S. Decennial Census

=== 2020 census ===
As of the 2020 census, Meriden had a population of 60,850. The population density was 2,564 people per square mile. The median age was 39.0 years; 6.2% of residents were under the age of 5, 21.9% were under 18, and 15.6% were 65 years of age or older. For every 100 females there were 93.2 males, and for every 100 females age 18 and over there were 91.3 males age 18 and over.

99.4% of residents lived in urban areas, while 0.6% lived in rural areas.

There were 24,346 households in Meriden, of which 29.5% had children under the age of 18 living in them. Of all households, 37.8% were married-couple households, 21.2% were households with a male householder and no spouse or partner present, and 32.3% were households with a female householder and no spouse or partner present. About 30.4% of all households were made up of individuals and 11.6% had someone living alone who was 65 years of age or older. There were 26,177 housing units, of which 7.0% were vacant. The homeowner vacancy rate was 1.5% and the rental vacancy rate was 6.5%.

Racial composition as of the 2020 census
Race	Number	Percent
White	33,809	55.6%
Black or African American	6,445	10.6%
American Indian and Alaska Native	446	0.7%
Asian	1,347	2.2%
Native Hawaiian and Other Pacific Islander	48	0.1%
Some other race	10,072	16.6%
Two or more races	8,683	14.3%
Hispanic or Latino (of any race)	22,295	36.6%

=== 2019–2023 American Community Survey estimates ===
In 2019–2023, 10.6% of the population was foreign-born. The average household size was 2.41.

For 2019–2023, the median household income was $68,617 and the per capita income for the city was $37,272. The median value of owner-occupied housing units was $221,600, and the home ownership rate was 58%. The high school graduation or higher rate was 86.4% (age 25+) and the bachelor's degree or higher rate was 22.2% (age 25+), and 14.2% of people were below the poverty line.

=== Political affiliation ===
Voter registration and party enrollment as of October 27, 2020
Party	Active voters	Inactive voters	Total voters	Percentage
Democratic	11,160	1,572	12,732	34.34%
Republican	4,946	501	5,447	14.69%
Unaffiliated	15,332	3,033	18,365	49.54%
Minor parties	478	50	528	1.42%
Total	31,916	5,156	37,072	100%

== Government ==
Until 1980, the city had a Mayor-Council ("strong mayor") structure. The last full-time strong mayor was Walter Evilia, a Republican and a former State Representative. Dana Miller was appointed the first city manager. The City Charter was last amended in 1994, giving the then largely ceremonial position of mayor more influence over city governance, including appointments to all boards and commissions and other positions within the appointing power of the City Council, as well as line-item veto over city budgets.

The current mayor, Kevin Scarpati, became the youngest popularly-elected mayor in the city's history, winning the 2015 election race by 78 votes against mayor Manny Santos, who had been the first Republican elected as mayor in nearly 30 years (the last being Walter Evilia). In 2018, Manny Santos ran an unsuccessful election for U.S. Congress in the 5th Congressional House District.

The city gained notoriety in government and political circles when in 2014, at the urging of newly elected mayor, Manny Santos, plaintiffs sued to remove appointees of boards and commissions and corporation counsel. Ultimately, the ruling by the state Supreme Court to vacate the appointments followed that of a lower court order. The appointments had been made by former mayor, Michael Rohde. In its ruling, the court noted, per the city charter, that the city council can appoint a corporation counsel, but only on the recommendation of the mayor, who at the time was Manny Santos.

== Arts and culture ==
=== Points of interest ===
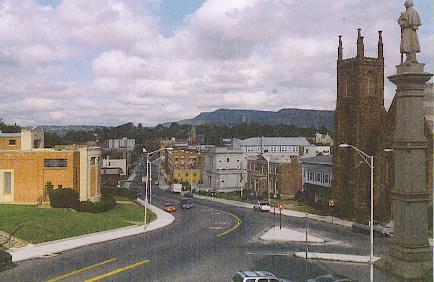
Looking west from city hall to the downtown area of Meriden. On the right is the Civil War monument (1873), with the Hanging Hills in the distance. (2007)

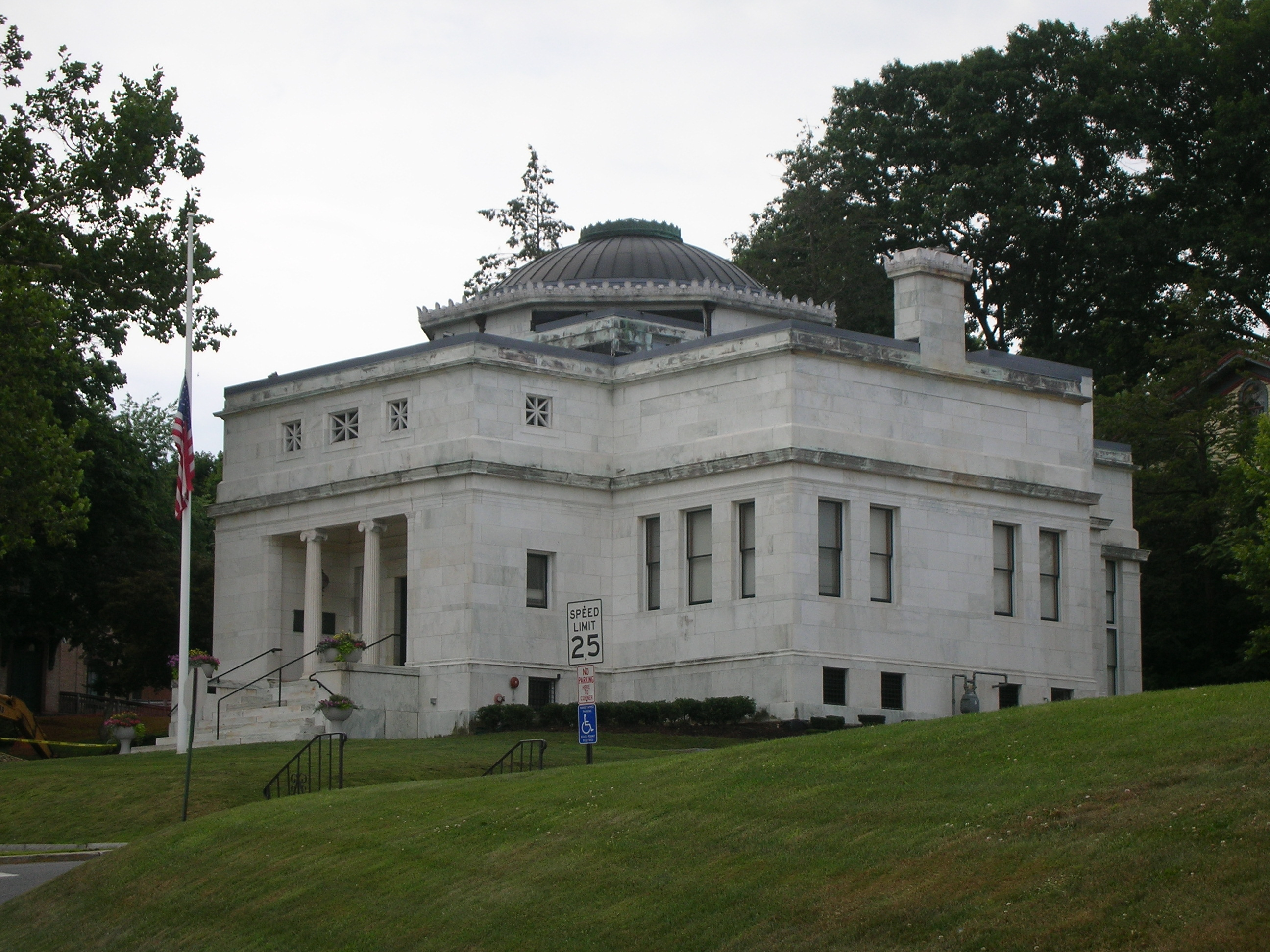
The Curtis Memorial Library building (2007)

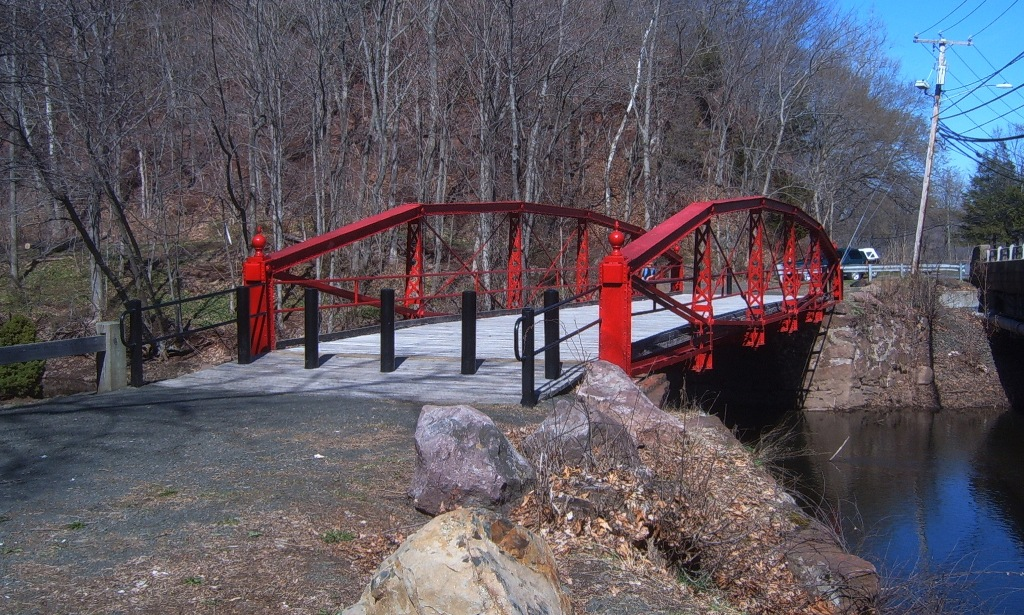
Red Bridge, one of no more than fifteen lenticular pony truss bridges remaining in Connecticut.

- Civil War monument (1873) in front of the Meriden City Hall. 158 men from Meriden who died in the war are listed.
- Curtis Memorial Library (1903), which is an example of Neo-Classical architecture and on the National Register of Historic Places The building now houses the Augusta Curtis Cultural Center
- Giuffrida Park offers many opportunities for outdoor recreation, with a variety of hiking trails and a lake.
- Historical cemeteries: Meetinghouse Hill Burying Ground (end of Ann Street), Meriden's first burial ground used 1727–1771; and Broad Street Cemetery (402 Broad Street), the second burial ground first used in 1771, includes a Revolutionary War commemoration plaque
- The Home National Bank building on Colony Street designed by the prominent, historical American architecture firm McKim, Mead & White
- Hubbard Park, about 1800 acres, part of the Hanging Hills, including Castle Craig on the National Register of Historic Places
- Meriden Main Post Office (1907), designed by James Knox Taylor on the National Register of Historic Places
- The Miller Company addition on Center Street, with black-and-white Modernist facade designed by influential American architect Philip Johnson in 1965
- Moses Andrews House (c. 1760), on the National Register of Historic Places
- Old Traffic Tower
- Red Bridge (c. 1890) on the National Register of Historic Places
- Site of the former Jedediah Wilcox mansion (built 1870), 816 Broad Street. Demolished in the late 1960s, a parlor room from the mansion was saved and is exhibited in the Metropolitan Museum of Art in New York
- Solomon Goffe House (1711), on the National Register of Historic Places
- Ted's Restaurant, known for its steamed cheeseburger, a modified version of the cheeseburger, invented in the early 1900s
- Portions of the Mattabesett Trail and the Metacomet Trail, both part of the New England National Scenic Trail, pass through Meriden. Local trails are being developed as the Meriden Linear Trails. Two sections are complete – the 2006-opened Quinnipiac River Gorge Trail and the 2013-completed Hanover Pond Trail – both of which use the railbed of the abandoned Meriden, Waterbury and Connecticut River Railroad.
- Meriden Mall
- Gallery 53, 53 Colony Street, home of the Arts & Crafts Association of Meriden

== Education ==
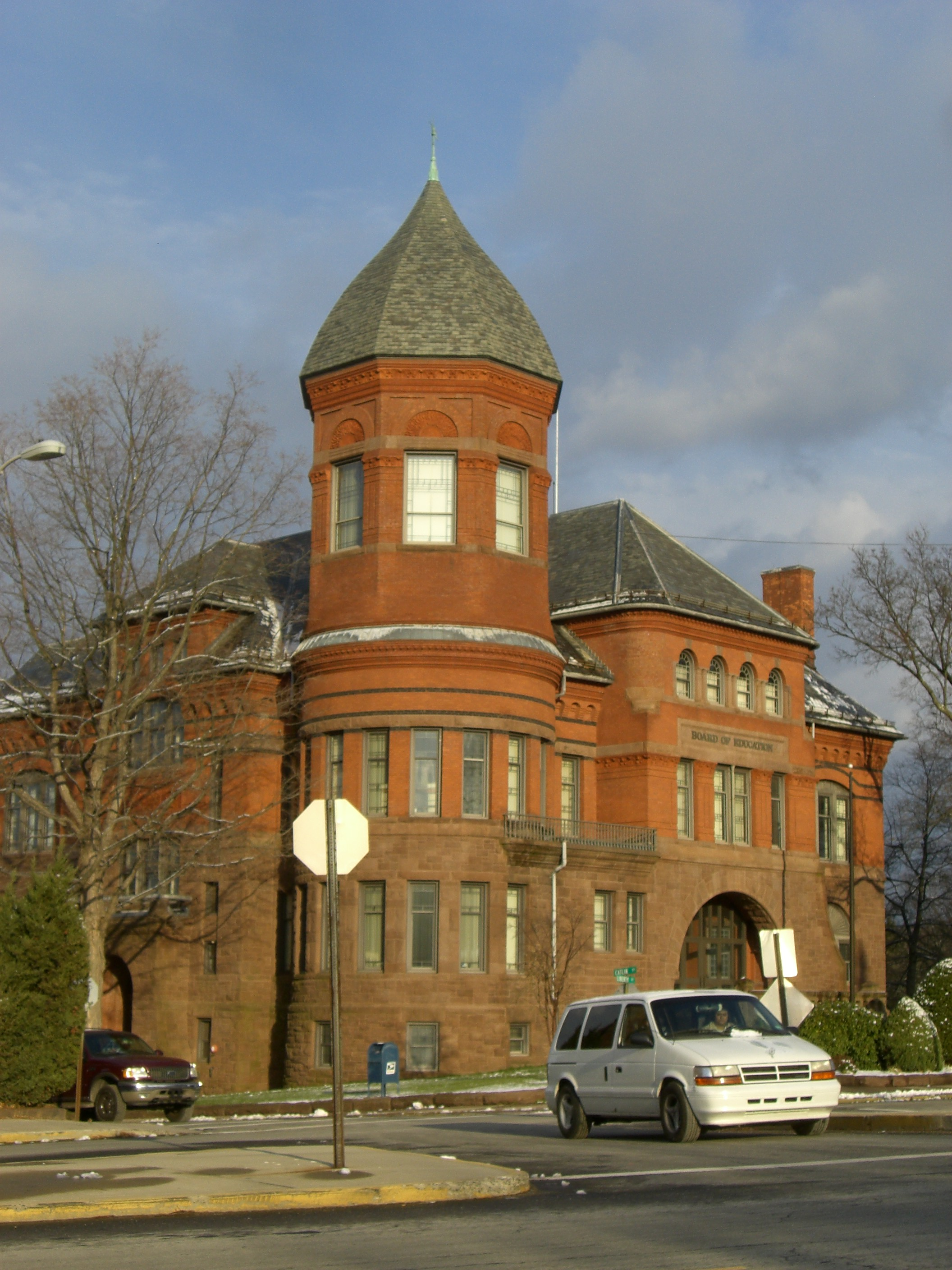
Board of Education building, formerly Meriden High School

The Meriden Board of Education operates several public schools:

=== Public elementary schools (K–5) ===
- John Barry
- Benjamin Franklin
- Nathan Hale
- Hanover
- Thomas Hooker
- Casimir Pulaski
- Israel Putnam
- Roger Sherman

=== Middle schools (6–8) ===
- Lincoln (public)
- Washington (public)
- Edison (public)

=== High schools ===
- Francis T. Maloney (public)
- Orville H. Platt (public)
- H. C. Wilcox (CT technical high school system)

Other schools in the area include the Catholic high schools Xavier High School (boys) and Mercy High School (girls) in neighboring Middletown. The private schools Cheshire Academy and Choate Rosemary Hall are in adjacent Cheshire and Wallingford respectively.

The former St. Stanislaus Catholic K–8 School, established in 1897 by people who immigrated from Poland, closed in 2015.

== Media ==
At one time The Meriden Daily Journal served as the community newspaper. Currently the Meriden Record Journal serves the communities of Meriden, Wallingford, Cheshire, and Southington and is located on South Broad Street by the Wallingford town line.

== Infrastructure ==
=== Transportation ===
==== Highway ====
The city of Meriden is located on Interstate 91, which provides access to Hartford, Springfield, and New Haven. Interstate 691 provides access to Interstate 84 and connects to points west like Waterbury. The Wilbur Cross Parkway (Connecticut Route 15) travels in a southwestern direction connecting to towns and cities like Wallingford, New Haven, and towards New York City. The parkway becomes the Berlin Turnpike (also Connecticut Route 15) on the northern end of Meriden. U.S. Route 5 passes through the city as North and South Broad Street.

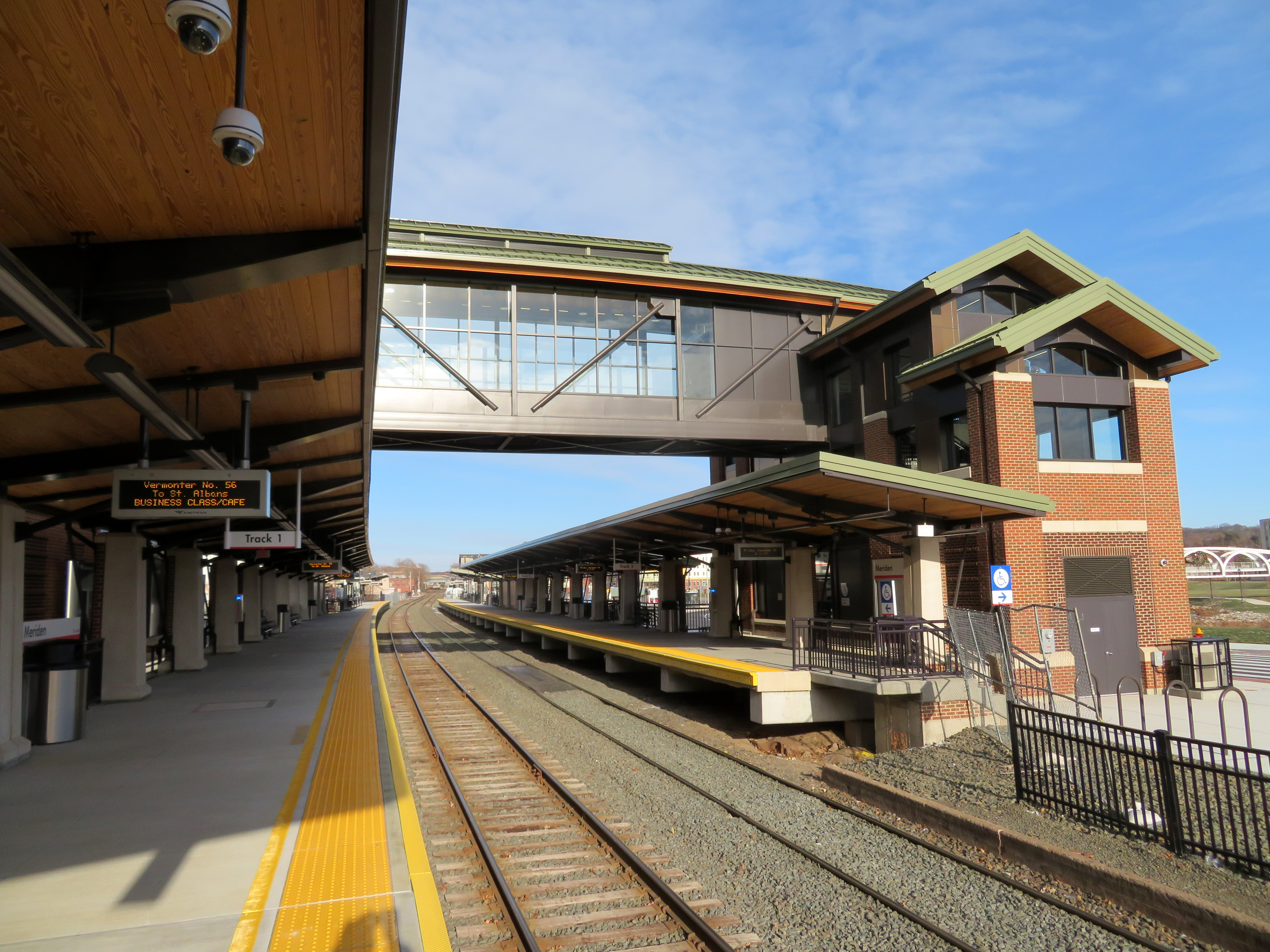
Meriden Transit Center in 2017

==== Railroad ====
Meriden Transit Center is located in downtown Meriden on the New Haven–Springfield Line, which runs between cities of New Haven and Springfield via Hartford. It is served by CT Rail Hartford Line commuter rail service, as well as Amtrak Hartford Line, Northeast Regional, Valley Flyer, and Vermonter inter-city rail service.

The Meriden, Waterbury and Connecticut River Railroad opened between Cromwell and Waterbury via Meriden in 1888–89. Passenger service west of Meriden to Waterbury ended in 1917, while Connecticut Company streetcars used the line between Meriden and Middletown until 1931. A portion of the line in Meriden remained in use for freight until 1976.

==== Bus ====
Beginning in 1784, Meriden had a stop on the New Haven-Hartford Stage Coach on Route 5 near the intersection of East Main Street. Years later, the same stop served as the bus stop for Greyhound and Peter Pan buses. Meriden had four daily departures to/from Hartford/Boston, and four daily departures to/from New Haven/New York City daily from the 1970s through 2007, when intercity bus service ceased serving Meriden.

Meriden is linked to the Connecticut Transit System, Connecticut's extensive public transit bus network. Three bus lines loop throughout the city of Meriden once per hour. The "B" bus route departs the Meriden railroad station for the southern terminus of Kohls Plaza, connecting for New Haven; the "A" bus route departs the rail station for the northern terminus of Meriden Square with connections to New Britain and Hartford; and the east/west "C" bus travels along East Main and West Main Streets, with a handful of departures to Middletown and Waterbury.

==== Airports ====
Meriden Markham Municipal Airport is the city-owned airport, located 3 miles (4.8 km) south of the city center on the border of South Meriden and Yalesville, and serves private and charter planes. Bradley International Airport (BDL) in Windsor Locks and Tweed New Haven Airport (HVN) in East Haven are the closest commercial airports to Meriden.

== Notable people ==
Since 1975, the Meriden Hall of Fame organization has issued recognitions. In the Meriden City Hall, plaques pay tribute to the inductees.

=== Arts and humanities ===
- Beau Billingslea (born 1944), actor
- Gary Burr (born 1952), American musician, songwriter, and record producer, primarily in the country music genre
- Miguel Cardona (born 1975), educator, United States Secretary of Education
- Tomie dePaola (1934–2020), author and illustrator of over 200 children's books
- Jennifer DiNoia (born 1982), singer and stage actress
- Isabella Doerfler (1883–1954), artist who worked for the Federal Arts Project
- Philip Dunning (1889–1968), playwright and theatrical producer
- Addie C. Strong Engle (1845–1926), author, publisher
- Ben Homer songwriter, composer and arranger who composed the tune to the hit song Sentimental Journey
- Rob Hyman (born 1950), rock musician and founding member of The Hooters
- Joe Marinelli (1957) Actor
- Conrad Henry Moehlman, professor of church history and author
- Rosa Ponselle (1897–1981), acclaimed opera singer
- Frank T. Southwick (1857–1948), composer, organist, and conductor
- Charlotte J. Sternberg (1920–2003), painter
- Janet Durso (2003), influencer, content creator.

=== Science and technology ===
- Vincent Lamberti (1927–2014), lab researcher whose work resulted in 118 patents, most notably the development of Dove soap. He grew up in Meriden, later moving to Upper Saddle River, New Jersey

=== Military ===
- Kevin Lacz (born 1981), Former United States Navy SEAL who served two tours in the Iraq War. Also an actor, author, public speaker and physician assistant
- Muriel Phillips (1921–2022), US Army nurse in World War II who served in Europe (Battle of the Bulge)
- Joseph Pierce (1842–1916), Union Army corporal who was born in China and fought in the Civil War
- David Pekoske (born 1955) Recipient of Homeland Security Distinguished Service Medal
- Erik Vargas (born 1989), U.S. Army Ranger who won three international sniper competitions (2021, 2022, 2023) representing the United States. He also won the U.S. Army Small Arms Championship in 2020 and 2026. Served four combat tours in Afghanistan in his early career.

=== Business ===
- John Leander Billard, coal merchant (lived in Meriden for most of his life)
- William Yale, tin ware merchant, largest manufacturer in Meriden in the early 19th century

=== Politics ===
- Levi Yale, abolitionist, postmaster, and justice of the peace

=== Sports ===
- John Jenkins (born 1989), National Football League defensive tackle (Miami Dolphins; college football: University of Georgia, Mississippi Gulf Coast Community College; Maloney High School, Meriden)
- Kid Kaplan (1901–1970), world champion featherweight boxer
- Al Niemiec (1911–1995), Major League Baseball player
- Gary Waslewski (born 1941), Major League Baseball player (1967–1972)

=== Miscellaneous ===
- Francisco Acevedo (born 1968), serial killer

== In popular culture ==
- A season 5 episode of the Discovery Channel series A Haunting, called "The Uninvited", takes place in Meriden in 2007.
- The 1989 Robert De Niro–starring film Jacknife was shot in Meriden. Several town sites are seen throughout the film, including Castle Craig at Hubbard Park, a historic house on Linsley Avenue, as well as film locations in the greater region.
