= Bradley & Hubbard Manufacturing Company =

Coordinates: 41.5366°N 72.8042°W

- Founded: 1852; 174 years ago
- Defunct: 1940; 86 years ago
- Fate: Sold to the Charles Parker Company
- Headquarters: Meriden, Connecticut, United States
- Area served: Predominately the United States
- Key people: Nathaniel Bradley, Walter Hubbard
- Products: Metalware, lamps, etc.

The Bradley & Hubbard Manufacturing Company (1852–1940) was formed in Meriden, Connecticut, and over the years produced Art Brass tables, call bells, candlestick holders, clocks, match safes, lamps, architectural grilles, railings, etc. Overall the company patented 238 designs and mechanical devices. "By the 1890s, the Bradley and Hubbard name was synonymous with high quality and artistic merit," said Richard E. Stamm for the Smithsonian Institution, which has an extensive collection of Bradley and Hubbard manufactured design objects in its collection.

In 1895, in a biography of co-founder Nathaniel Bradley, Henry Hall described Bradley & Hubbard as, "This company has enjoyed almost phenomenal success, and from a small concern, employing only six workmen, it has grown to own and occupy an immense plant of brick buildings, with a floor area of nearly seven acres, employing about 1,500 operatives, with offices and sales rooms in New York, Boston, Chicago and Philadelphia."

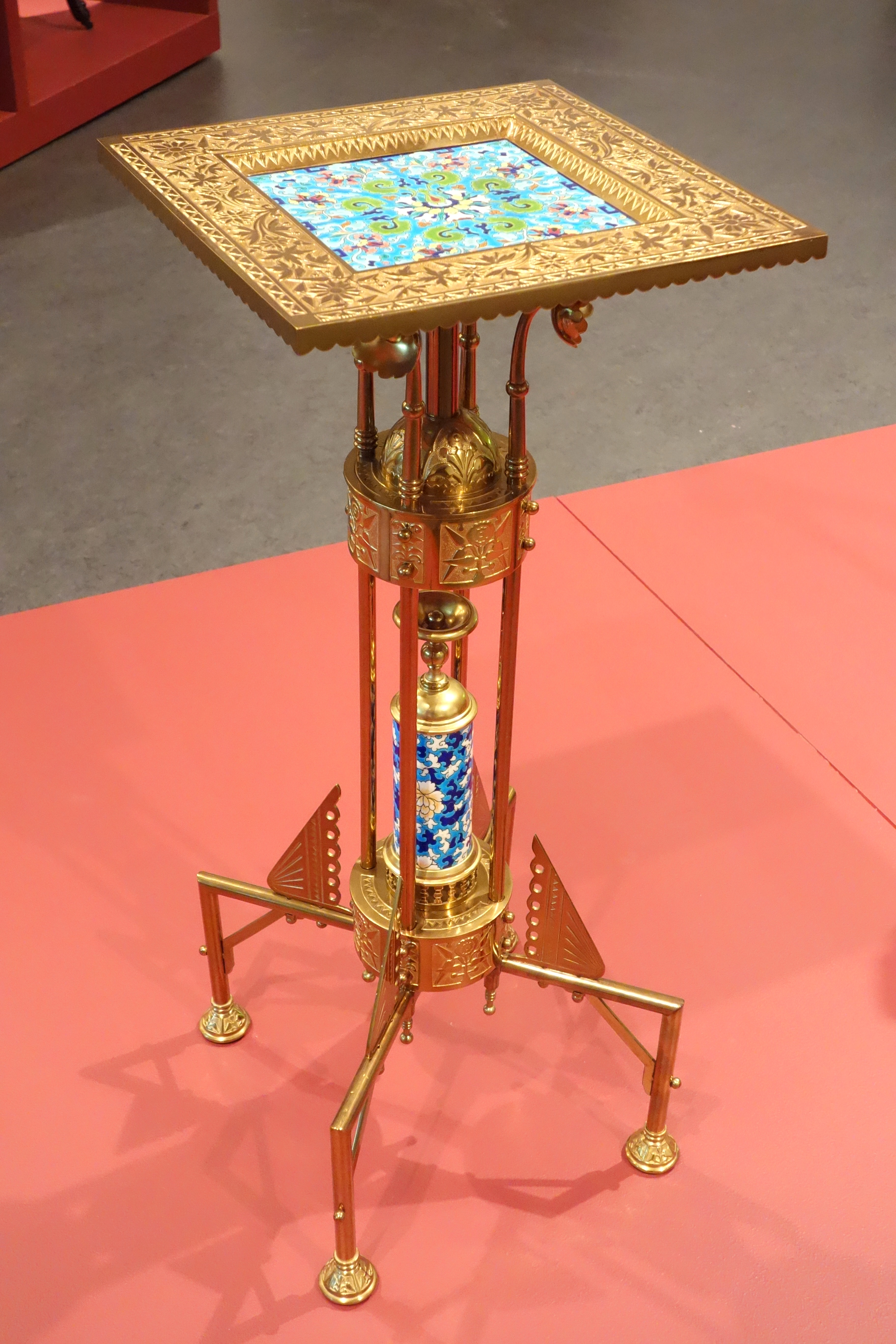
A stand manufactured by the Bradley & Hubbard Manufacturing Company, Meriden, c. 1885 exhibited in the Brooklyn Museum of Art exhibition 19th century Modern (2011–12).

In 1940, the business was sold to the Charles Parker Company.

As of 2016, over 175 Bradley & Hubbard designs are in North American museums and collections, including the Baltimore Museum of Art; the Brooklyn Museum; the Canadian Centre for Architecture in Montreal; Carnegie Museum of Art in Pittsburgh; Connecticut Historical Society, The Henry Ford in Dearborn, Michigan; the Historic New England organization in Boston; the Metropolitan Museum of Art in New York; the Munson Williams Proctor Arts Institute in Utica, NY; the Smithsonian in Washington; the Wadsworth Atheneum in Hartford; and Yale University Art Gallery in New Haven. A customized interior installation by B&H is also situated in the James Blackstone Memorial Library in Branford, CT.

In 2006–07, Bradley & Hubbard designs were featured in an exhibition A brass menagerie: Metalwork of the Aesthetic Movement curated by Anna Tobin D'Ambrosio in Utica, NY and New York City. The exhibition was described by a New York Times critic as "One of the small, must-see exhibitions this summer".
