= Charlotte J. Sternberg =

American painter

Charlotte Joan Sternberg
- Born: 1920; Meriden, Connecticut, United States
- Died: 2003 (aged 82–83)
- Education: Yale University
- Known for: Painting
- Style: Landscape art
- Patrons: Dwight Eisenhower
- Website: charlottejoansternberg.com

Charlotte Joan Sternberg (1920-2003) was an American painter.

== Early life and education ==
Sternberg was born in Meriden, Connecticut in 1920. Her parents encouraged her interest in art. She attended Yale University and received a degree in fine art in 1942. While at school Charlotte hung out with her Yale friends at the restaurant, George and Harry's, north of the New Haven green. She was there when the news of the attack on Pearl Harbor arrived at Yale. She described the chaos of everyone yelling and running around. The war colored the experiences of the students including Charlotte. She painted portraits of injured and ill soldiers during World War II. She painted a portrait for Dwight Eisenhower during his presidency. It was also during this time that she discovered egg tempera. Egg tempera was enjoying a small revival at Yale. Professors such as Louis York and Daniel V. Thompson (author of The Practice of Tempera Painting) had rediscovered ancient techniques that had not been widely used since the Renaissance. This became her preferred medium for her paintings.

== Personal life ==
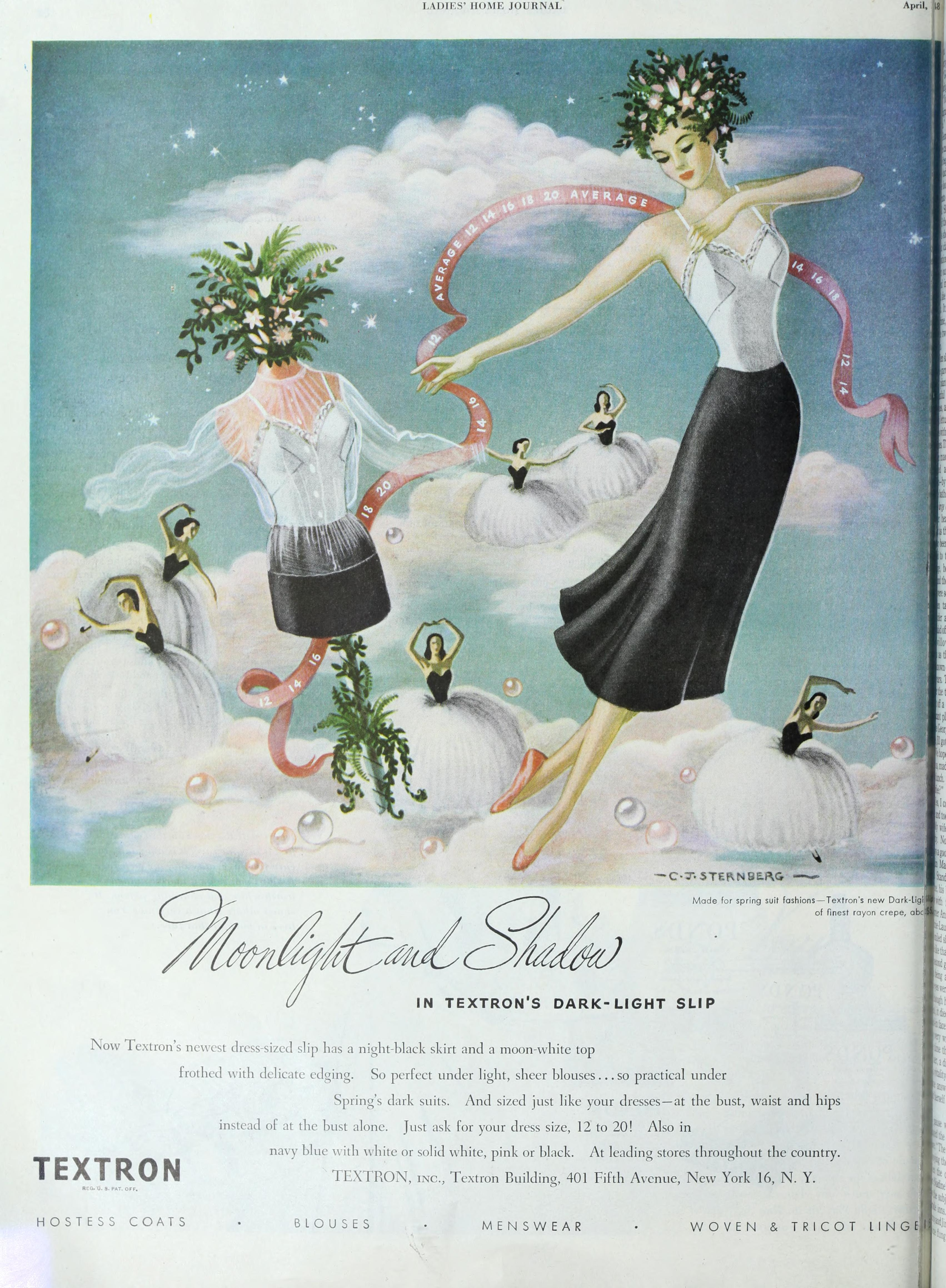
Textron fabrics ad, painted by C. J. Sternberg (1948)

In 1953 she married Arthur Koch and they had a daughter - Carla Sternberg Koch.

== Career and later life ==
She resided in New England and found inspiration from the region for her work. While she primarily painted portraits in her early career, she is most recognized for her landscapes. She painted farms and small American towns. Egg tempera was her preferred medium. Charlotte became a commercial illustrator. She worked for companies such as J. Walter Thompson, the advertising agency, creating artwork for Esso (later Exxon), Textron, and Lederle Pharmaceuticals. In 1945 she became involved with Associated American Artists (AAA). Many of her snow scenes of New England were printed on Christmas cards over the next 50 years. Sternberg also designed a textile print that was marketed by AAA and produced by M. Lowenstein & Sons as part of the Signature Fabrics series. Along with the portrait of Eisenhower she was also commissioned to paint Gov. John Lodge of Connecticut in the 60's. Her artwork was also exhibited in one-woman shows at the New Britain Museum of American Art in Connecticut and the Bennington Museum in Vermont and is in many private collections. Her work appeared on magazine covers, including Collier's and Country Gentleman.

From 1970-1984, she served on the faculty of the Paier College of Art in Hamden, Connecticut, where she taught rendering, perspective, creative painting, and egg tempera in the interior design, illustration, and fine art departments. In 1980, she was inducted into the Meriden, Connecticut Hall of Fame. There is one example of Sternberg's work in the Cooper Hewitt Smithsonian Design Museum's collection: Textile, Snowflakes, 1952-1957.

== Additional information ==
There is a video on YouTube of Charlotte Sternberg discussing her methods of working that was taken from old slides and home movies.

== Notable collections ==
- Connecticut, from the United States Series, 1946, gouache on prepared paperboard sheet, Smithsonian American Art Museum
