= Meriden Gravure Company =

- Founded: 1888
- Fate: Merged with Stinehour Press
- Headquarters: Meriden, Connecticut, United States
- Area served: Predominantly the United States
- Key people: E. Harold Hugo
- Products: Printing

The Meriden Gravure Company (in Meriden, Connecticut, United States, 1888–1989) was founded by Charles Parker and James F. Allen, and continued a previous printing operation by Parker. The company developed an expertise in high quality image reproduction, which initially was driven by the needs of the silver industry.

== History ==
The Meriden Gravure Company was founded in Meriden, Connecticut, in 1888 by Charles Parker and James F. Allen, and grew out of an earlier printing venture established by Parker. In its early years, the company specialized in high-quality image reproduction for Meriden's silver industry, producing illustrated material for the city's manufacturers and becoming closely tied to Meriden's broader industrial economy. The firm was incorporated in 1905.

The company quickly attracted business from clients that required highly detailed image reproduction, including scientific journals, museums, libraries, and illustrated book publishers. The company developed an extensive list of academic, museum, and commercial customers, including General Electric and the United States government.

According to the Yale University Library, "Through careful quality control, including an insistence on photographing directly from the item to be reproduced and using high quality paper, Meriden Gravure achieved a reputation of consistent excellence in printed illustration... [and] rose to prominence in the early twentieth century through specialization in high-fidelity image reproduction." A "driving force" of the company's success was Meriden Gravure Company president E. Harold Hugo (1910–85), from the late 1920s onward when he started working there at the age of 14.

Meriden Gravure was known for high-quality printing of books illustrating art and design history. Extensive examples of Meriden Gravure Company-printed books are in university and museum libraries.

In 1977, the company merged with another known for printing quality, the Stinehour Press in Lunenburg, Vermont. In 1989, the Meriden operations were closed and the Meriden Gravure presses moved to the Vermont location. The Meriden Gravure archive at Yale University in New Haven consists of business documentation, proofs and other material documenting the company's work from 1895 to 1990.

In 1989, the Meriden plant closed and operations were consolidated in Vermont.

The company's records, including correspondence, production files, photographs, and printed samples, are preserved at Yale University in the Beinecke Rare Book and Manuscript Library.
