= Solomon Goffe House =

Historic house in Connecticut, United States

- The Solomon Goffe House
- U.S. National Register of Historic Places
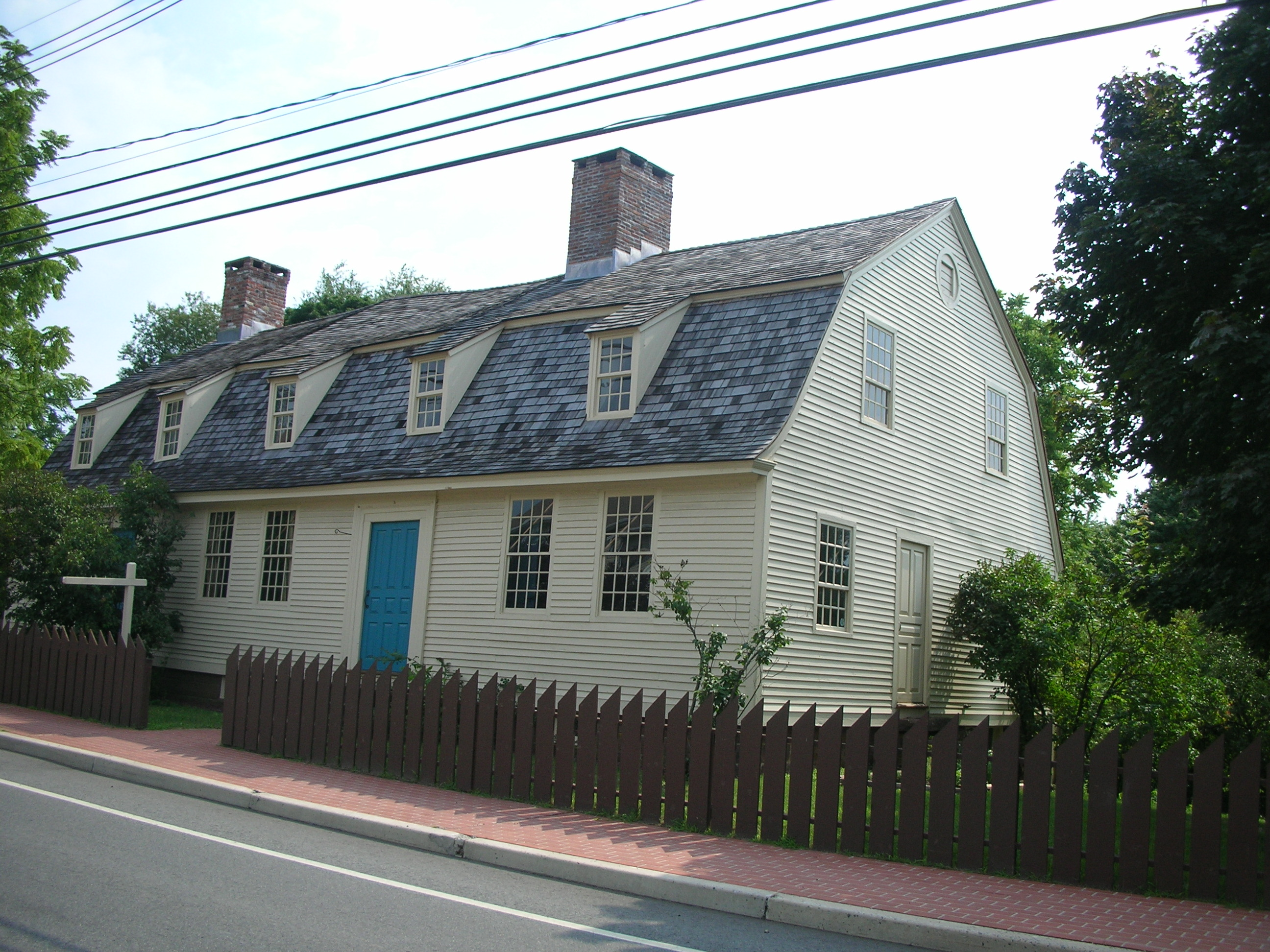
- Solomon Goffe House as seen in May, 2007
- Location: 667 North Colony Road; Meriden, Connecticut
- Coordinates: 41.5528°N 72.7884°W
- Area: less than one acre
- Built: 1711
- NRHP reference No.: 79002645
- Added to NRHP: January 16, 1979

The Solomon Goffe House is a historic house museum at 667 North Colony Road in Meriden, Connecticut, United States. It was built in 1711, and is the oldest remaining building in the city of Meriden. It is owned by the city and is open for tours during the summer, or by appointment.

== Description and history ==
The Solomon Goffe House is located north of downtown Meriden, on the east side of North Colony Street between Griswold and Maynard Streets. It is a 1 1/2-story wood-frame structure, with a gambrel roof, central chimney, and clapboarded exterior. It is eight bays wide, with two entrances and six windows; there are four shed-roof dormers on the front roof face. The interior has undergone significant alterations, but three downstairs rooms remain relatively unaltered, and other features are preserved elsewhere.

The house was built about 1711 by Solomon Goffe, about whom little is known. It was probably constructed at first as a five-bay structure, with the northern three bays added later. It had received numerous small additions in the 20th century, most of which have been removed during restoration.

== Current use ==
The house is currently a museum owned by the city. There are tours the first Sunday of the month from April to November 1:30pm to 4:30pm. Each month has a different theme. One of the highlights of the landscaping is its traditional herb garden, which was designed after examples of typical 18th century herb gardens in the area.

The Archaeology Society of Connecticut has done some digs on the property and found a number of objects, including an axe blade.

== See also ==
- List of the oldest buildings in Connecticut
- National Register of Historic Places listings in New Haven County, Connecticut
