= Charles Parker Company =

American manufacturing company

- Founded: 1832
- Defunct: c. 1975
- Headquarters: Meriden, Connecticut, United States
- Area served: Predominately the United States
- Key people: Charles Parker, Dexter Parker
- Products: Metalware, Art Brass, guns, lamps, hardware, coffee mills, piano stools, sewing machines, spectacles

The Charles Parker Company (born 1832) was formed in Meriden, Connecticut, by Charles Parker, and over the years manufactured products including metalware, Art Brass (now in museums), hardware, lamps, spectacles, and piano stools. Also related to the company were others founded by Charles Parker: including Parker Brothers (gun manufacturer), Meriden Curtain Fixture Co. (established 1869), and Parker & Whipple Co. clock manufacturers.

As of 1868, Charles Parker Company and related initiatives were described as comprising "four large manufactories, located at different places in Meriden and its vicinity, and some of them comprise so many departments for the manufacture of distinct articles that they might be regarded as several distinct establishments." The main factory, consisting of numerous buildings, was estimated to cover two acres in the center of Meriden.

At the 19th century fairs, the Meriden Curtain Fixture Company participated in the 1876 Centennial Exhibition in Philadelphia and received an award. The company also participated in the 1893 World's Columbian Exposition in Chicago. As of 1895, this company is referred to as "the largest establishment of the kind in the world".

In 1940, the Charles Parker Company acquired the Bradley & Hubbard Manufacturing Company.

The Charles Parker Company was in operation until the 1970s. In 1973, the company participated as an exhibitor at the Eastern States Exposition in West Springfield, Massachusetts.

Among the diversity of Charles Parker products, Parker guns are very actively collected and traded, including the historical catalogues illustrating the designs. Design catalogues featuring Parker vises design are also a significant collectible. Charles Parker Company "Art Brass", largely focused on tables and shelves, is another. Examples of these Art Brass designs are in the Brooklyn Museum, the Dallas Museum of Art, the Munson Williams Proctor Arts Institute museum in Utica, New York, the St. Louis Art Museum, and Yale University Art Gallery.

In 2005–2007, Charles Parker Art Brass designs were featured in the exhibition A Brass Menagerie: Metalwork of the Aesthetic Movement exhibited in Utica and New York City. In 1994–95, the company was included in the Dallas Museum of Art's exhibition Silver in America 1840-1940: A century of splendor.
