= Parker Bros. =

Former American firearms company

Parker Bros
- Formerly: Parker Snow Co. Meriden Manufacturing Company; Charles Parker Maker; Parker Brothers Guns; Parker Bros. Shotguns
- Industry: Arms industry
- Founded: 1867; 159 years ago
- Founder: Charles Parker
- Fate: Defunct, 1942 (acquired by Remington Arms)
- Headquarters: Meriden, Connecticut, United States
- Key people: Wilber and Dexter Parker; Charles A. King
- Products: Firearms, ammunition, and accessories
- Parent: Remington Arms (1934–1942)
- Website: www.remington.com

Parker Bros (also known at various times as Parker Brothers Manufacturing Company, Parker Brothers Guns, and Parker Bros. Shotguns) was an American firearms firm, mostly producing shotguns from 1867 to 1942. During these years, approximately 242,000 guns were produced in various grades, and are widely considered the finest and most collectible American shotgun.

== Models ==
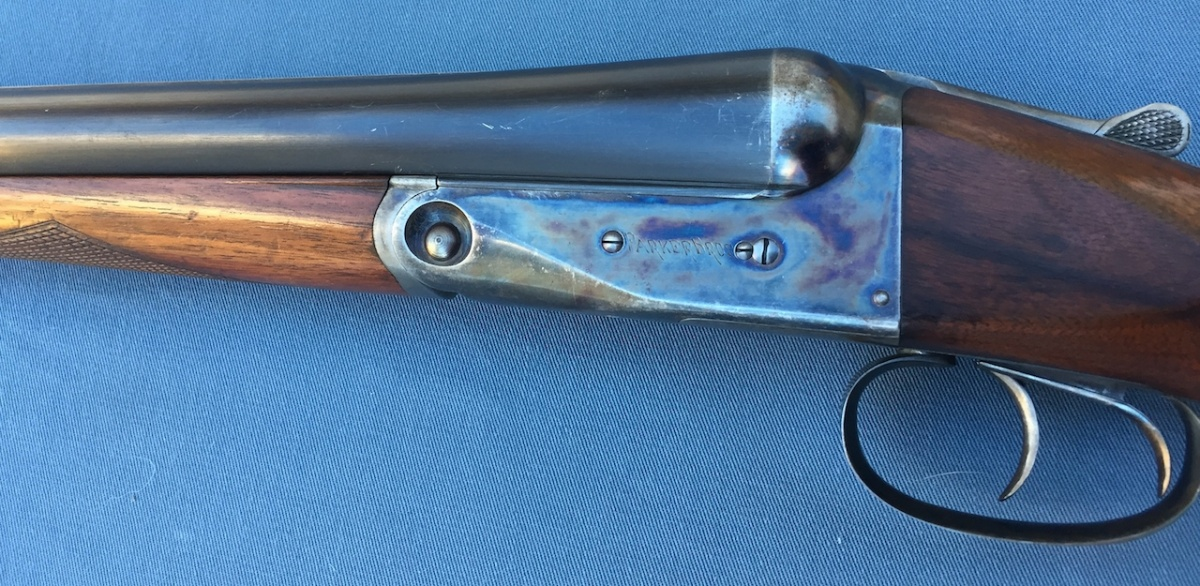
Parker shotgun, Trojan Grade

All Parker guns are break-open style actions, most of which are side-by-side double barreled designs; the remainder are single barrel guns intended for use in trap shooting.

For the first 20+ years of production, Parker Bros. used an exposed hammer design, but by 1888 the first hammerless guns were offered for sale.

Parker guns were offered in 8, 10, 11, 12, 14, 16, 20, 28 and .410 gauges. There is an experimental example known to have been produced in 18 gauge.

Parker guns were sold at various price points; the basic gun being the same design with the price increasing as production costs (engraving, fit and finish, quality of wood grain, barrel steel, etc.). These grades included: dollars grades, Trojan & VH through A-1 Special/ Invincible.

== History ==
Parker Bros. was launched in Meriden, Connecticut, as Parker Snow Co. by Charles Parker, whose mission was to produce rifles during the Civil War for the United States Army. The company was among several entrepreneurial initiatives by Charles Parker, founder of the Charles Parker Company.

Over the years, Parker shotguns were exhibited in several national and international expositions including the Centennial International Exhibition, Philadelphia in 1876; the Melbourne International Exhibition, Australia in 1880-81; the World’s Columbian Exposition, Chicago in 1893; and the Sportsmen’s Exposition, New York in 1895, 1896, and 1897.

The company was acquired by Remington Arms in 1934, and phased out of business by 1942.

== Famous shooters ==
Parker guns were often viewed as the gun of choice by celebrities including: Annie Oakley, Frank Butler, Clark Gable, as well as the top ranked competition shooters of the day.

== PGCA ==
There is an active interest in Parker guns today, most visibly represented by the Parker Gun Collector's Association.
