= Association of the Christian faithful =

Catholic lay society

In the Catholic Church, an association of the Christian faithful or simply association of the faithful (Latin: consociationes christifidelium), sometimes called a public association of the faithful, is a group of baptized persons, clerics or laity or both together, who, according to the 1983 Code of Canon Law, jointly foster a more perfect life or promote public worship or Christian teaching, or who devote themselves to other works of the apostolate.

A 20th-century resurgence of interest in lay societies culminated in the Second Vatican Council, but lay ecclesial societies have long existed in forms such as sodalities (defined in the 1917 Code of Canon Law as associations of the faithful constituted as an organic body), confraternities (similarly defined as sodalities established for the promotion of public worship), medieval communes, and guilds.

== Terminology ==
Under the 1917 Code of Canon Law, groups of laity that gathered with a common purpose and apostolate were called piae uniones ("pious unions" or "pious associations"). With the replacement of the former code by the 1983 Code of Canon Law, they were referred to as "associations of the faithful", either "private" or "public".

A Pastoral Note of the Italian Episcopal Conference issued on 29 April 1993 defined three of the terms:

- Associations. Those whose structure is organic and institutional with regard to composition of governing bodies and membership.
- Movements. Those united not so much by institutional structure as by adherence in way of life to certain dynamic ideas and by a shared spirit.
- Groups. Those with a certain spontaneity in the way of joining them, wide freedom in self-structuring, and somewhat limited size, giving rise to more homogeneous membership.

However, it added that these terms are often applied quite loosely. For example, the Community of Sant'Egidio, which calls itself a community, is also described as a movement.

Associations of the faithful are distinguished from institutes of consecrated life and societies of apostolic life. A group of people who intend to become an institute of consecrated life or society of apostolic life will normally come together at first as an association of the faithful, while awaiting the decision of the bishop, after consulting the Holy See, to establish them in the desired form.

== Ecclesiastical approval ==
Private associations are not supervised by the local bishop, but bishops are instructed to be watchful that their energies are not dissipated.

Public associations are supervised and authorized by the local bishop. The diocesan bishop can create associations of this kind after a consultation of the Holy See, without the need of the latter's permission.

Associations that are approved on an international level are approved by the Dicastery for the Laity, Family and Life (previously by the Pontifical Council for the Laity) and listed in the Directory of International Associations of the Faithful. Associations that exist on a national level are approved by a country's episcopal conference, while those at a diocesan level are approved by the local bishop.

Since 2022, "The diocesan bishop, before erecting - by decree - a public association of the faithful with a view to becoming an Institute of Consecrated Life or a Society of Apostolic Life of diocesan right, must obtain the written permission of the Dicastery for Institutes of Consecrated Life and Societies of Apostolic Life."

== Examples ==
=== Franciscan Brothers of Peace ===
The Franciscan Brothers of Peace, a canonically recognized Public Association of the Faithful was founded in St. Paul, Minnesota, in 1982. In keeping with their charism, the Brothers advocate for the unborn, the handicapped, the elderly and the poor. They operate a food pantry and working with the Center For Victims of Torture provide temporary shelter for international victims of torture who have arrived in the Twin Cities area.

=== Amigonian Cooperators ===
The Amigonian Cooperators was instituted by the Capuchin Tertiaries (Amigonian Friars), and is involved in the rehabilitation of children in conflict with the law. Their work among the laity following the charism of the Capuchin Bishop Luis Amigó y Ferrer (1854–1934) dates back to 1937. On 8 December 1992, the Pontifical Council for the Laity recognized the Cooperadores Amigonianos as an international association of the faithful of pontifical right.

=== Franciscan Brothers of the Eucharist ===
The Franciscan Brothers of the Eucharist, founded in 2002 as a companion community to the Franciscan Sisters of the Eucharist, is a Public Association of the Faithful approved by the Archdiocese of Hartford. As their particular and primary charism is upholding the dignity of the human person, their ministry has included public anti-abortion prayer vigils, counseling the mentally ill, caring for the elderly and coordinating outdoor adventure programs for youth.

=== Saint Francis Third Order Confraternity of Penitents ===
The Saint Francis Third Order Confraternity of Penitents is a private association of the faithful recognized pursuant to CIC/83 canon 299 §3 by the Bishop of the Diocese of Fort Wayne–South Bend on March 25, 2019.

=== Society of Saint Vincent de Paul ===
This organization, part of the Vincentian Family, offers material help to the poor or needy and runs thrift stores or "op shops", which sell donated goods at a low price and raise money for the poor.

== See also ==
- Pious Association
- Catechism of the Catholic Church
- Lay ecclesial ministry
- List of Ecclesial movements
- Universal call to holiness
- Vocational Discernment in the Catholic Church
