= Franciscan Brothers of the Eucharist =

The Franciscan Brothers of the Eucharist is a Roman Catholic, Franciscan public association of the faithful directed toward becoming a religious institute for men. The association was founded in 2002 in the state of Connecticut, United States, as a complement to the Franciscan Sisters of the Eucharist. The mother house of the order is in Meriden, Connecticut in the Roman Catholic Archdiocese of Hartford.

The Franciscan Brothers of the Eucharist is open to men who are discerning the call to religious life as brothers. They have a house near the motherhouse of the Franciscan Sisters of the Eucharist. Every day the brothers pray and attend Mass with the sisters at their center. Both the brothers and sisters are financially self-supporting.

Since its beginning, the brothers have engaged in many activities. They grow vegetable gardens, flower gardens, and raise small farm animals, such as chickens. As the brothers' primary charism is upholding the dignity of the human person, their ministry has included public pro-life prayer vigils, counseling the mentally ill, caring for the elderly and coordinating outdoor adventure programs for youth.
