= Curtis Memorial Library =

- U.S. National Register of Historic Places
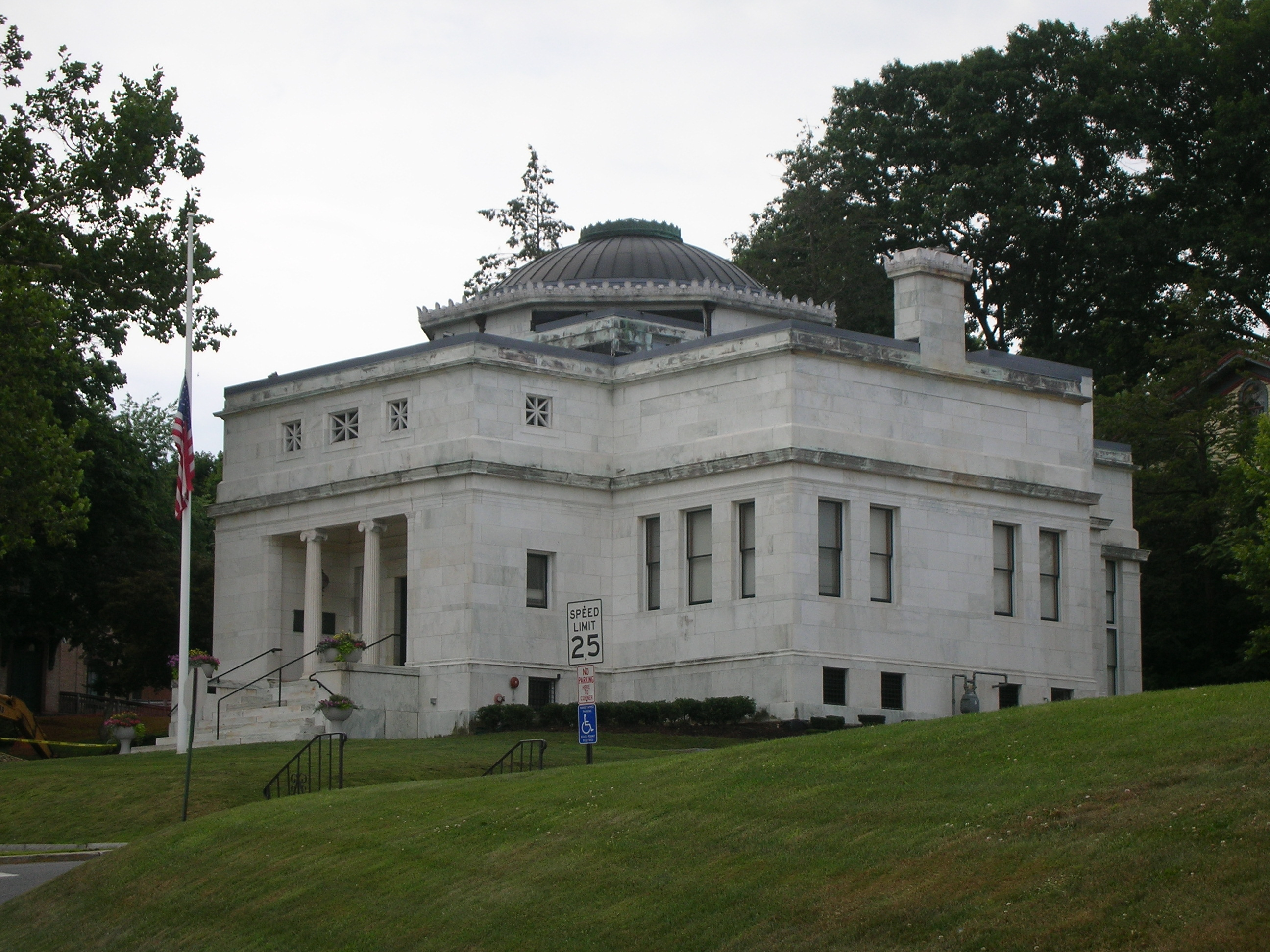
- The building in 2007
- Location: 175 East Main Street; Meriden, Connecticut
- Coordinates: 41.5355°N 72.7977°W
- Area: 1 acre (0.40 ha)
- Built: 1903
- Architect: Richard Williams
- NRHP reference No.: 81000618
- Added to NRHP: April 27, 1981

The Curtis Memorial Library, now the Augusta Curtis Cultural Center, is a historic former library building at 175 East Main Street in Meriden, Connecticut. It was designed by New Haven architect Richard Williams in the Classical Revival style, and was completed in 1903. The building was a gift to the city from Augusta Munson Curtis in honor of her husband George, who was one of the city's leading businessmen and onetime mayor. It was listed on the National Register of Historic Places in 1981.

== Description and history ==
The Curtis Cultural Center is located in the historic civic center of Meriden, set on a knoll at the southeast corner of East Main and Pleasant Streets. It is a two-story masonry structure, built out of white Vermont marble. It presents as a single-story structure, with the second floor only evident due to a high parapet above the main cornice. A copper dome is placed at the center of the cruciform structure. The front projection houses the main entrance, which is deeply recessed in an opening that has flanking pilasters and two fluted Ionic columns set in antis. The interior retains many original features, including mosaic tile flooring, a red marble fireplace, and Corinthian columns supporting the dome.

Meriden's first library was established in 1898 by the Thursday Morning Club, an association of local women, and was kept in a private home. In 1900 August Munson Curtis offered to buy land and fund construction of a dedicated building. This building was completed in 1903, and was dedicated in honor of Curtis' daughter Agnes and husband George; he was a prominent industrial executive and also served as mayor of the city. The building remained in use as a library until 1974, when new facility was opened on Miller Street. This building was then repurposed by the city as an arts and cultural center, named in honor of its benefactor.

== Gallery ==
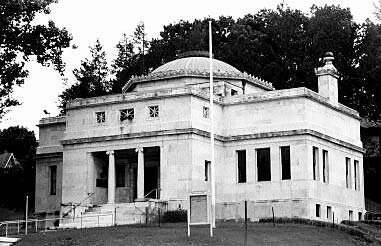
The library in 1901

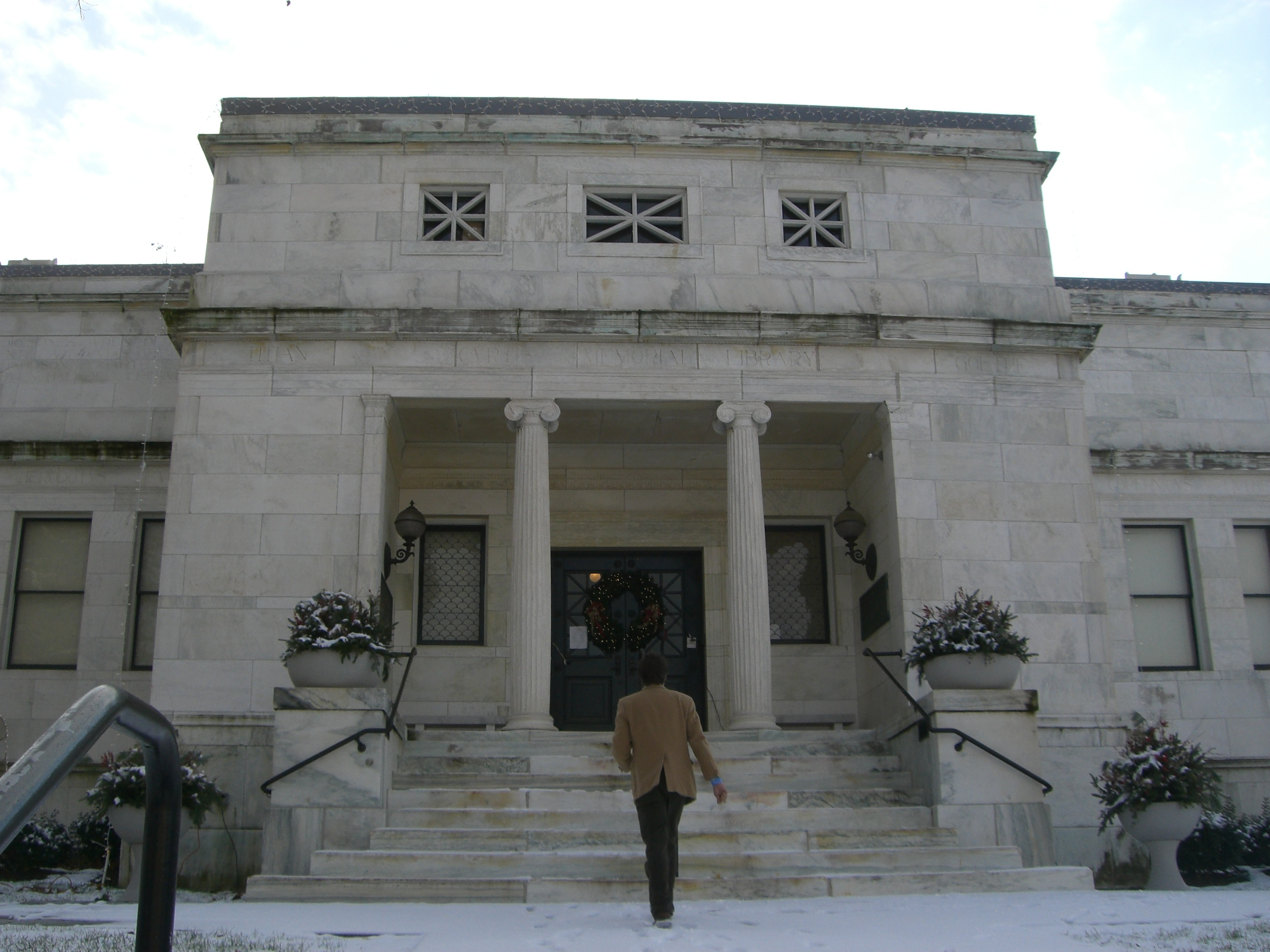
The facade of the building

== See also ==
- National Register of Historic Places listings in New Haven County, Connecticut
