= Red Bridge (Meriden, Connecticut) =

- U.S. National Register of Historic Places
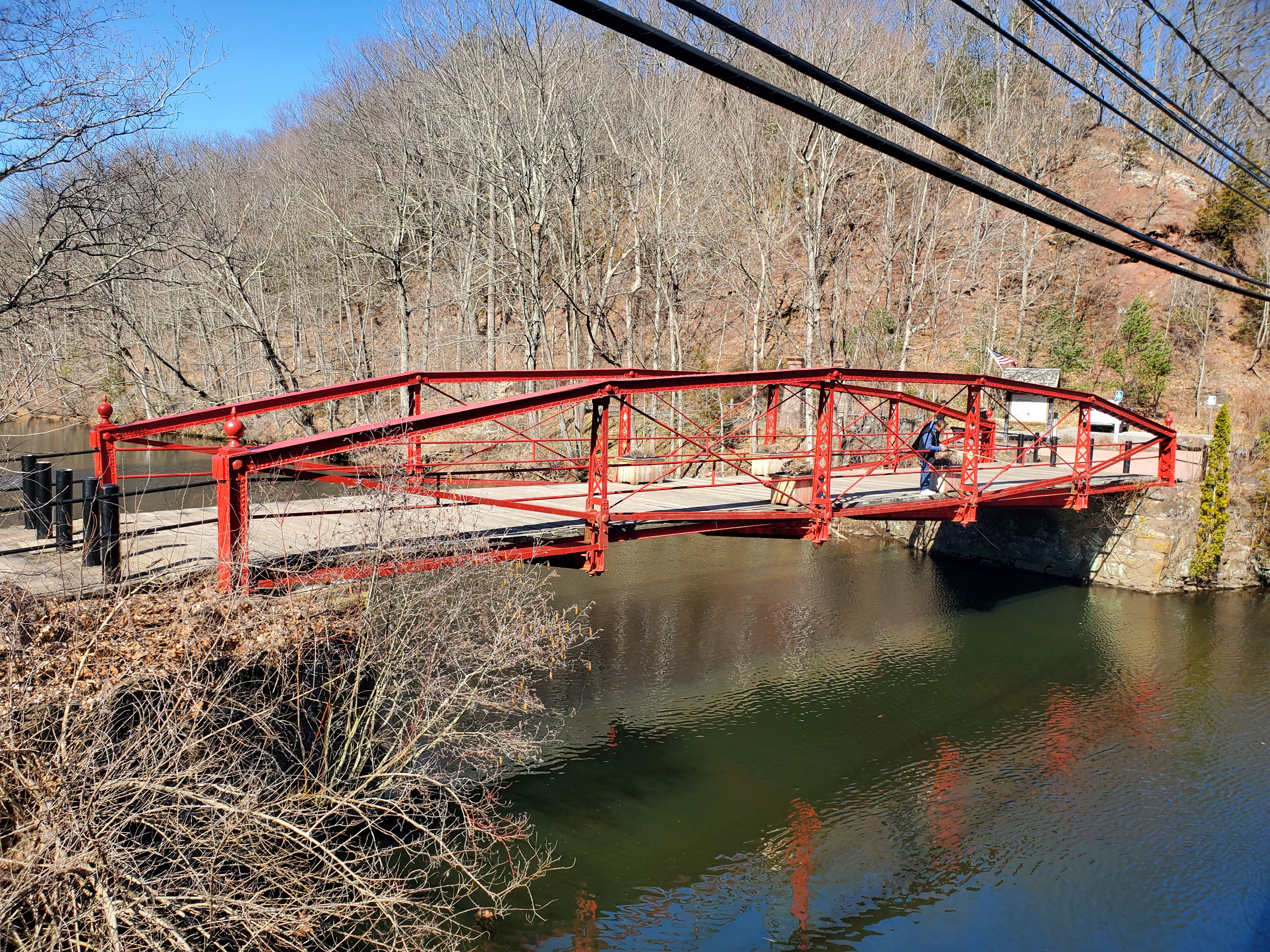
- Red Bridge in March 2023

- Location within Connecticut Location within the United States
- Location: Near Oregon Road over the Quinnipiac River, Meriden, Connecticut
- Coordinates: 41°31′20″N 72°50′20″W
- Area: less than one acre
- Built: 1891
- Built by: Berlin Iron Bridge Company
- Architectural style: Lenticular truss
- NRHP reference No.: 93001345
- Added to NRHP: December 10, 1993

The Red Bridge is a historic bridge spanning the Quinnipiac River near Oregon Road in Meriden, Connecticut. It was built in 1891 by the Berlin Iron Bridge Company, and is one of a small number of surviving lenticular truss bridges in the state, and was listed on the National Register of Historic Places in 1993. The bridge is open to pedestrian traffic only.

== Description and history ==
The Red Bridge is located in south Meriden, crossing the Quinnipiac River just upriver from the bridge that now carries Oregon Road. It is a single-span wrought iron lenticular pony truss structure, measuring 82 feet (25 m) long with a roadway width of 17 feet (5.2 m), resting on brownstone abutments. Its bridge deck is wooden, of recent construction.

The bridge was built in 1891 for the city by the Berlin Iron Bridge Company, the largest fabricator of metal bridges in New England at the time. It replaced a wooden truss bridge that already bore the name "Red Bridge", which carried Oregon Road, then a major route between Meriden and Cheshire. The bridge is one of a small number (less than twenty) of lenticular truss bridges built by the company in its home state to survive, out of more than 100 built. The bridge was bypassed for vehicular use in the 1970s, and underwent a major restoration in 2018, after which it was reopened to foot traffic.

== See also ==
- National Register of Historic Places listings in New Haven County, Connecticut
- List of bridges on the National Register of Historic Places in Connecticut
