= Pious Association =

Pious association or pious union in the canon law of the Roman Catholic Church is the legal concept that describes an organization of Catholic persons, approved by the local ordinary, engaged in the practice of the spiritual and corporal works of mercy in the name of and in accordance with the teachings of the Church.

== Definition ==
Title V, 'Associations of the Christian Faithful' (Cannon 298–329) defines these organizations as distinct from societies of consecrated and apostolic life which are to foster a more Christian life, promote public worship and Catholic doctrine, and exercise other works of such as evangelization, piety, and charity. The most recent and definitive Apostolic constitution concerning pious associations is "Provida Mater Ecclesia - Concerning Secular Institutes," issued by Pius XII in 1947.

== See also ==
- Association of the Christian faithful
- Catechism of the Catholic Church
- Lay ecclesial ministry
- List of Ecclesial movements
- Universal call to holiness
