= Franciscan Sisters of the Eucharist =

Roman Catholic religious congregation for women

Institute of the Franciscan Sisters of the Eucharist

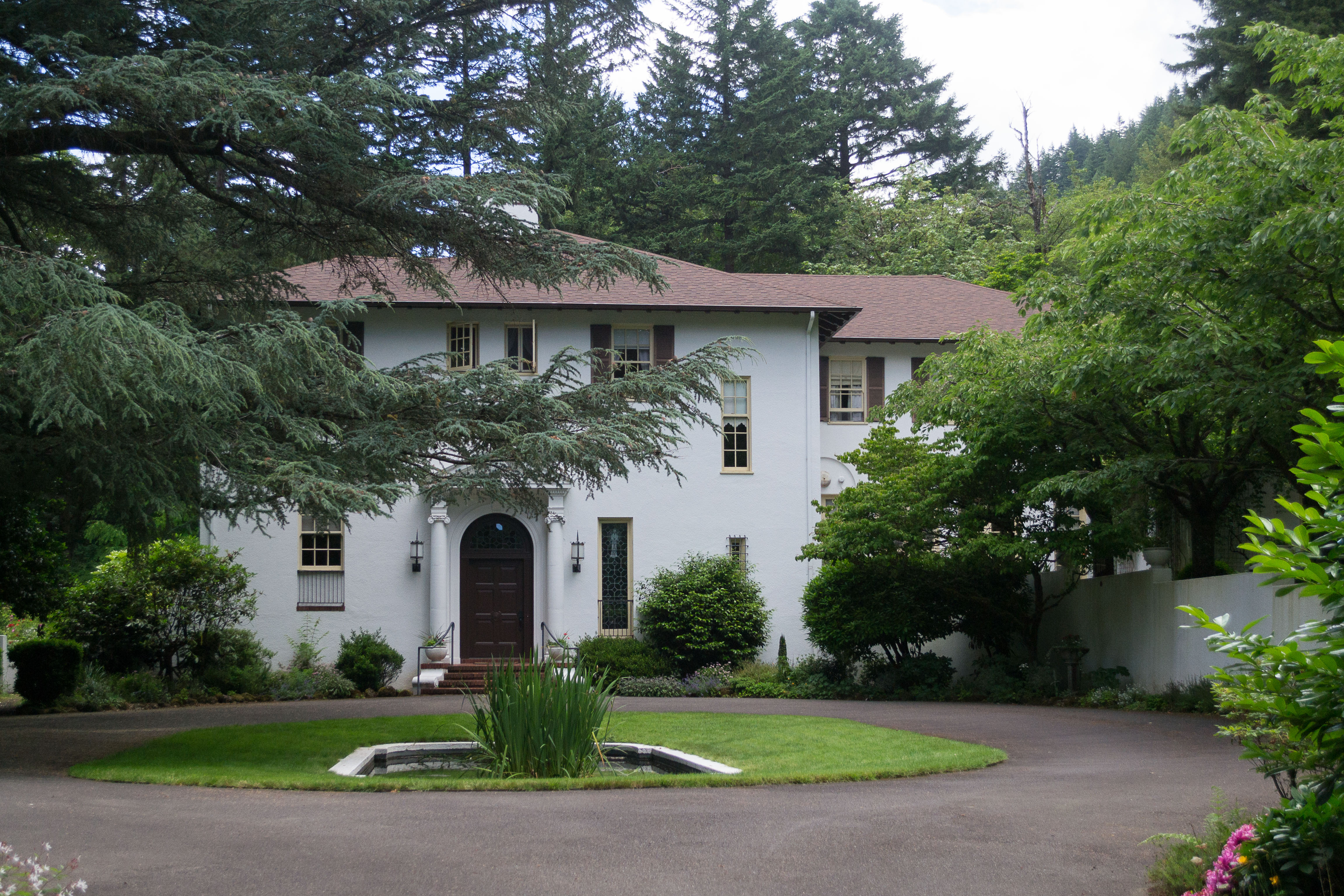
- The Franciscan Sisters of the Eucharist Center in Bridal Veil, Oregon
- Abbreviation: FSE
- Established: December 2, 1973; 52 years ago
- Founder: Mother Rosemae Pender, FSE and Co-foundress Mother Shaun Vergauwen, FSE
- Type: Centralized Religious Institute of Consecrated Life of Pontifical Right (for Women)
- Purpose: To rebuild the Church
- Headquarters: Generalate: 405 Allen Ave. Meriden, Connecticut USA
- Members: 80 members (2018)
- Superior General: Mother Miriam Seiferman, FSE (July 2017-present)
- Vicar General: Mother Barbara Johnson, FSE
- Affiliations: Roman Catholic Church
- Website: https://fsecommunity.org/

The Institute of the Franciscan Sisters of the Eucharist (FSE) is a Catholic religious congregation for women. The motherhouse is in Meriden, Connecticut, in the Archdiocese of Hartford.

== History ==
The Institute of the Franciscan Sisters of the Eucharist was established by Mother Rosemae Pender, FSE, and Co-founder Mother Shaun Vergauwen, FSE on December 2, 1973, It emerged from a period of renewal within the Franciscan Sisters of Perpetual Adoration of La Crosse, Wisconsin, which led to a divergence of outlook within that Congregation. Mother Rosemae Pender and Mother Shaun Vergauwen served as Mother General and Vicar General, respectively, from the beginning until 2005. In 2002, the Franciscan Brothers of the Eucharist was founded in Meriden as a complement to the Franciscan Sisters of the Eucharist.

From 1976 to 2004, the religious sisters operated the ferry terminal and store on Shaw Island, part of the San Juan Islands in the state of Washington. As of 2018, the congregation had approximately eighty members.

== Apostolate ==
- Franciscan Life Center, Meriden, Connecticut: provides a variety of services including counseling, education, and youth programs.
- Franciscan Home Care and Hospice Care, Meriden, Connecticut: is licensed to provide home health care services including nursing, physical therapy, and home health aides, in almost two dozen Connecticut towns.
- In Oregon, the Sisters operate the Franciscan Montessori Earth School, founded in 1977.

The community has twelve different centers around the world, including the United States, Jerusalem, Rome and Assisi. The Sisters teach at universities, work in hospitals, operate a school in Bethlehem and work at the Vatican.

The Franciscan Sisters of the Eucharist share the original founders with the Franciscan Sisters of Perpetual Adoration and the Sisters of St. Francis of Assisi of St. Francis, Wisconsin.
