= List of sites administered by the Connecticut State Historic Preservation Office =

This is a list of historic sites in Connecticut that are administered by the Connecticut Department of Economic and Community Development's Historic Preservation Office. The division fulfills a range of responsibilities in the field of historic preservation, including the operation of five historic sites owned by the state.

#	Name	Image	Location	County	Description
1	Prudence Crandall Museum		Canterbury	Windham	Historic house and the site of Prudence Crandall's Canterbury Female Boarding School which reopened in 1833 for African-American students, whom she called "young Ladies and little Misses of color".
2	Old New-Gate Prison & Copper Mine		East Granby	Hartford	Historic former prison and mine site
3	Eric Sloane Museum and Kent Furnace		Kent	Litchfield	Museum focused on the work and interests of artist, author, and illustrator Eric Sloane, in a building that was donated to the state by Stanley Works, with exhibits of hand tools, an iron furnace and the artist's studio.
4	Viets' Tavern		East Granby	Hartford	C. 1760 unrestored home of John Viets, first prison warden of Old Newgate Prison; not open to the public.
5	Henry Whitfield State Museum		Guilford	New Haven	Historic house dating from 1639. The oldest house in Connecticut and the oldest stone house in New England.

== See also ==
- List of museums in Connecticut
