= West Suffield Mountain =

Traprock mountain ridge

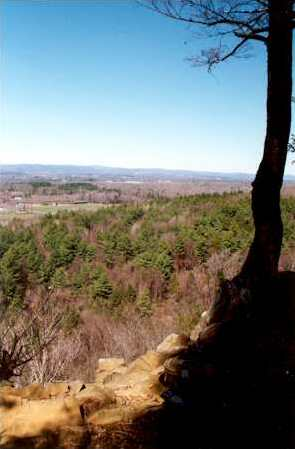
- View from West Suffield Mountain

Highest point
- Elevation: est. 710 ft (220 m) ridge high point
- Coordinates: 41°58′43″N 72°44′07″W to 42°02′22″N 72°42′47″W

Geography
- Location: Suffield, Connecticut
- Parent range: Metacomet Ridge

Geology
- Rock age: 200 Ma
- Mountain type(s): Fault-block; igneous

Climbing
- Easiest route: Metacomet Trail

West Suffield Mountain, est. 710 feet (220 m), is a traprock mountain ridge located between the Berkshires and the Connecticut River Valley in north-central Connecticut. It is part of the narrow, linear Metacomet Ridge that extends from Long Island Sound near New Haven, Connecticut, north through the Connecticut River Valley of Massachusetts to the Vermont border. West Suffield Mountain is known for its scenic ledges and woodlands, unique microclimate ecosystems, and rare plant communities. It is traversed by the 51-mile (82 km) Metacomet Trail, and the 110-mile (180 km) Metacomet-Monadnock Trail begins at the northern foot of West Suffield Mountain.

== Geography ==
The West Suffield Mountain ridgeline rises steeply between 250 and 550 feet (76 and 168 m) above the Connecticut River Valley to the east, with a high point of 710 feet (220 m) above sea level. A prominent landscape feature, it is roughly 4 miles (6 km) long by 1 mile (1½ km) wide at its widest point, although the steepness of the terrain makes the actual square mileage much larger.

The West Suffield Mountain ridgeline extends south from the Connecticut border in the hamlet of Rising Corner to the pass between it and Peak Mountain on the Suffield/East Granby border. It lies entirely within the town of Suffield. The Metacomet Ridge, of which West Suffield Mountain is part, continues north as Provin Mountain and south as Peak Mountain. The northwest side of West Suffield Mountain drains into Congamond Lake, thence to the Westfield River, then to the Connecticut River and Long Island Sound; the south and west sides drain into Salmon Brook, then to the Farmington River, then to the Connecticut River. The east side drains into the Connecticut River.

== Geology and ecology ==
West Suffield Mountain, like much of the Metacomet Ridge, is composed of basalt, also called traprock, a volcanic rock. The mountain formed near the end of the Triassic Period with the rifting apart of the North American continent from Africa and Eurasia. Lava welled up from the rift and solidified into sheets of strata hundreds of feet thick. Subsequent faulting and earthquake activity tilted the strata, creating the cliffs and ridgeline of West Suffield Mountain. Hot, dry upper slopes, cool, moist ravines, and mineral-rich ledges of basalt talus produce a combination of microclimate ecosystems on the mountain that support plant and animal species uncommon in greater Connecticut. West Suffield Mountain is also an important raptor migration path. (See Metacomet Ridge for more information on the geology and ecosystem of West Suffield Mountain).

== Conservation and recreation ==
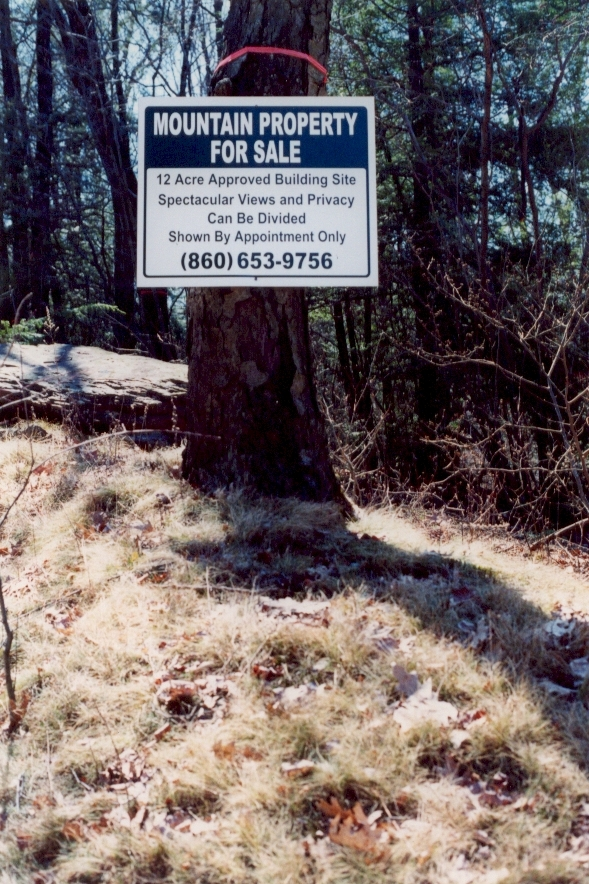
"Mountain Property For Sale" on West Suffield Mountain

The 51-mile (82 km) Metacomet Trail (maintained by the Connecticut Forest and Park Association), traverses West Suffield Mountain and is open to hiking, snowshoeing, picnicking, and other passive pursuits; high ledges and overlooks provide scenic views of the surrounding rural countryside.

Expanding suburban sprawl and ridgetop homebuilding present the greatest threats to the unique ecosystem and landscape of West Suffield Mountain. Although much of the mountain lies within private ownership, recent conservation efforts by the town of Suffield, the Suffield Land Conservancy, and other non-profit groups have managed to preserve several key parcels on the mountain. In 2000, West Suffield Mountain was included in a study by the National Park Service for the designation of a new National Scenic Trail now tentatively called the New England National Scenic Trail, which would include the Metacomet-Monadnock Trail in Massachusetts and the Mattabesett Trail and Metacomet Trail trails in Connecticut.

== See also ==
- Metacomet Ridge
- Adjacent summits:

↓ South

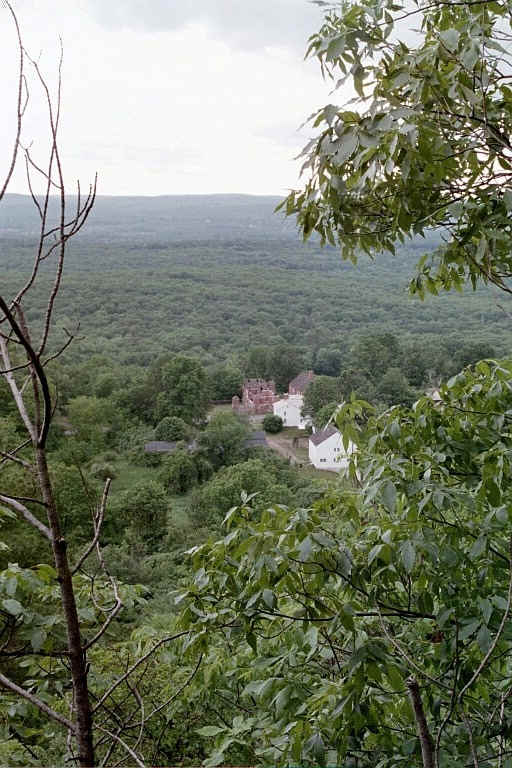
Peak Mountain

North ↑

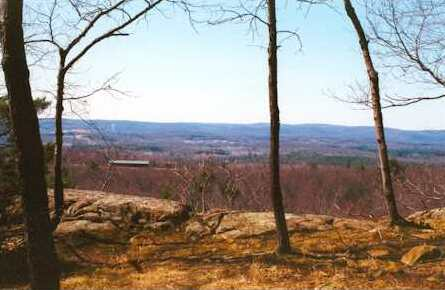
Provin Mountain
