= East of the Mountains =

East of the Mountains may refer to:

- East of the Mountains (novel), a 1999 novel by David Guterson
- East of the Mountains (film), a 2021 drama film, based on the novel

== See also ==
- East Mountain (disambiguation)
