= Eric Sloane Museum =

- Location: 31 Kent-Cornwall Road; Kent, Connecticut, United States
- Type: History museum
- Website: ericsloane.com/the-eric-sloane-museum
- Kent Iron Furnace
- U.S. National Register of Historic Places
- Location within Connecticut Location within the United States
- Coordinates: 41°44′19″N 73°28′12″W
- Area: 17.3 acres (7.0 ha)
- Built: 1826
- Built by: Kent Iron Co.
- NRHP reference No.: 77001401
- Added to NRHP: October 5, 1977

The Eric Sloane Museum (formerly known as the Sloane-Stanley Museum) in Kent, Connecticut, is a museum featuring the studio and antique hand tool collections of Eric Sloane. It is owned and operated by the State Historic Preservation Office of Connecticut. The property includes the Kent Iron Furnace, a granite blast furnace which produced pig iron for almost 70 years, beginning in 1826. The furnace is listed on the National Register of Historic Places.

== Museum ==
The Eric Sloane Museum is located North of Kent Village, on the West Side of U.S. Route 7. Its grounds are separated from the road by the tracks of the Housatonic Railroad; a crossing facilitates access to its grounds, and those of the adjacent Connecticut Antique Machinery Association. The museum houses a collection of antique hand tools collected over many years by Eric Sloane. The museum building, which served as Sloane's art studio, was given to the state in 1969 by the Stanley Works tool manufacturer. It also has displays related to the industrial uses of the site in the 19th century.

== Iron furnace ==
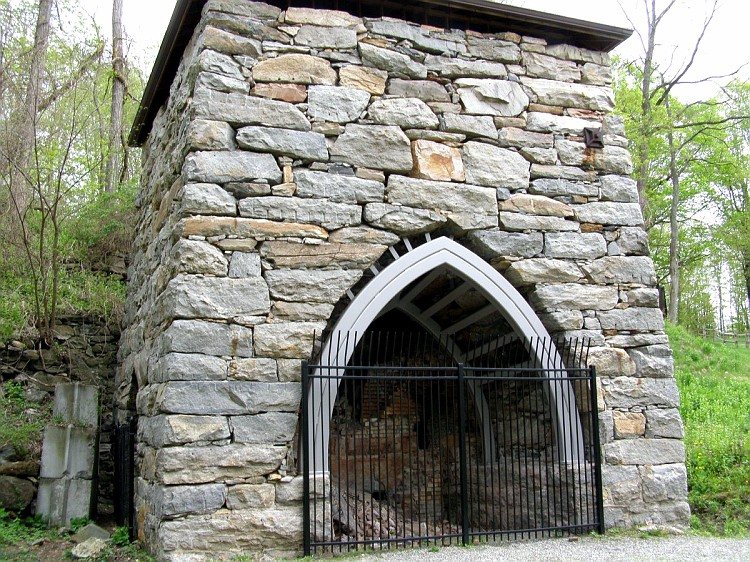

The iron furnace is located down the hill from the museum, on a rise overlooking the Housatonic River to the west. It is a stone structure 32 feet (9.8 m) in height, with sides that are 29 feet (8.8 m) at the base, sloping inward as the structure rise. Three of its faces have pointed-arch openings, two smaller ones on opposite sides. The structure is built out of rough cut granite blocks randomly laid without mortar, with iron plates and tie rods added to prevent expansion-related problems.

The history of iron processing at this site began in 1826, with the construction of a cold blast furnace. Iron ore was brought to the site from a quarry in South Kent, and the processed iron was mainly used in the construction of railroads. That furnace was rebuilt as a hot blast furnace in 1846, and was enlarged to its present size in 1870. The facility was operated until 1892. During its operational period, it would have been surrounded by wooden structures designed to facilitate operations and shelter the main structure. These were typically temporary in nature, due to the risk of fire and the frequent need for reconfiguration.

== See also ==
- List of sites administered by the Connecticut State Historic Preservation Office
- National Register of Historic Places listings in Litchfield County, Connecticut
