= Flight 624 =

Flight 624 may refer to:

- United Airlines Flight 624, crashed on 17 June 1948
- Air Canada Flight 624, crashed on 29 March 2015
