= Old New-Gate Prison =

- U.S. National Register of Historic Places
- U.S. National Historic Landmark
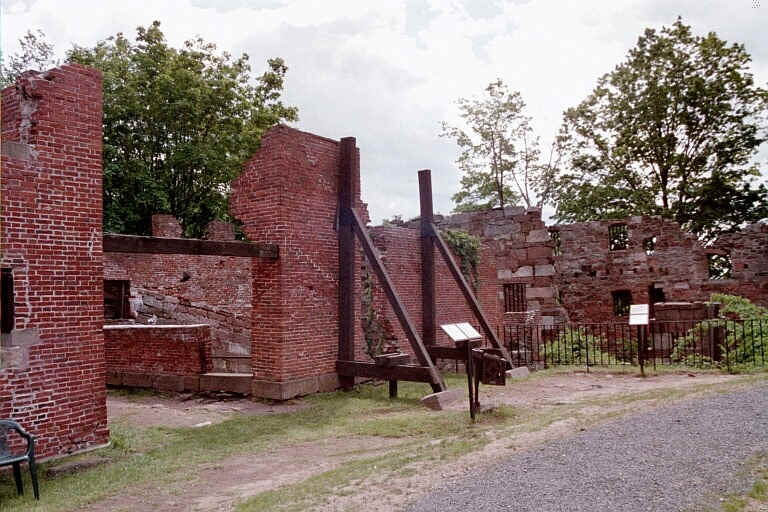

- Location within Connecticut Location within the United States
- Coordinates: 41°57′43″N 72°44′44″W
- Area: 5 acres (2.0 ha)
- Built: 1775
- Architect: mason levy
- NRHP reference No.: 70000839

Significant dates
- Added to NRHP: October 15, 1970
- Designated NHL: November 28, 1972

Old New-Gate Prison is a former prison and mine site on New-Gate Road in East Granby, Connecticut. It is now operated by the state of Connecticut as the Old New-Gate Prison & Copper Mine Archaeological Preserve. Previously closed for restoration since 2009, it was re-opened on July 14, 2018.

The site includes a colonial-era copper mine, which visitors are able to explore through a guided tour, and the remains of the state's first official prison, which was used between 1776 and 1782 to house prisoners of war from the American Revolutionary War. The site was designated a National Historic Landmark in 1972.

== History as a mine ==
State records indicate that copper was discovered on the west side of Talcott Mountain, then part of Simsbury, in 1705. The construction of a mine began in 1707. The mine was created by digging a vertical shaft and tunneling horizontally, with additional vertical shafts dug for ventilation.

=== The Woodbridge Company ===
In 1709, three clergymen, John Woodbridge, Timothy Woodbridge, Jr., and Dudley Woodbridge, formed a company to extract the ore, refine it, and cast it into bars. They invited the people of Simsbury to participate in the venture. Sixty-four residents, in exchange for financial and or labor investments, became shareholders as a result.

Excavations were made on the summit of the hill and two perpendicular shafts, one nearly eighty feet deep and the other thirty-five, were dug through the rock to raise the ore. Caverns were carved out at the bottom of the shafts that extended several hundred feet in various directions.

The ore was developed amateurishly, broken out by hand, upgraded, and shipped to British consignees. As a result of the manner in which the ore was extracted profits were minimal. Twinned with this, British legislation at the time prohibited the ore from being smelted in America. Because they could not construct a furnace to extract the copper from the ore, the entire mass had to be shipped to England, resulting in large shipping costs. Within four years, the venture failed.

=== Continuation of mining ===
Interest in the mine did not disappear with the Woodbridge Company. In 1714, Jonathan Belcher, William Partridge, and one of the original company’s clergy, Timothy Woodbridge Jr, leased the area from the town and raised £10,000 to resurrect the mine.

Skilled miners were brought in to the mine in order to dig and extract the ore. The ore was then hauled fourteen miles to Hartford, shipped to New York City, then loaded onto ships bound for England where it was refined.

In order to combat the percolation of water into the mine, drains were dug to draw it away. This ultimately proved unsuccessful, and pumps were required to be kept running throughout the day.

Alongside miners brought specifically to the mine, local workers and farmers from nearby Windsor were employed as labor. On top of this, African and Native American slaves, both imported and indigenous, were leased from masters and forced to work the mines.

The three to five percent yield of pure copper was not enough to offset the cost of running the mine. Speculators pulled out, and Belcher eventually dissolved the venture.

Others would later renew the lease, but profits remained small and cargoes shipped to Europe generated slim returns. Over the years, two ships were lost; one taken by the French as a prize during war, and the other sunk in the English Channel.

Some company owners defied the ban on smelting in America and secretly constructed furnaces in order to pound, smelt, and refine the ore. This too proved too great a financial burden and was abandoned.

== History as a prison ==
By 1773, the Connecticut General Assembly sought a central prison to house its convicts. The unsuccessful mine, with its labyrinth of caves and shafts, was explored as an option as an escape-proof institution in which isolated prisoners could be kept from society.

In May 1773, Colonel William Pitkin, Eratus Wolcott, and Captain Jonathan Humphrey visited the mines. They determined that with the carving of a 15-by-12 foot lodging room near the first shaft, they had the makings of a formidable prison.

The colony purchased the remaining years of Captain James Holmes’s mining lease and set about constructing the necessary infrastructure needed to convert the mine into a satisfactory prison. A small blockhouse was constructed over the main shaft – the only entrance and exit from the mine. The lodging room was enlarged and supplied with accommodations for the expected prisoners.

The General Assembly passed an act prescribing the terms of imprisonment: The sentence for a first offense of burglary, robbery, or counterfeiting was not to exceed ten years, and for the second offense, life. The keeper of the prison was authorized to punish the convicts with “moderate whipping, not exceeding ten stripes, and by putting shackles and fetters upon them.” It was intended that the prisoners would be employed at labor.

The prison had only one point of entry and exit, a forty-foot ladder down into the mine from the guardhouse. Prisoners were provided with musty straw to sleep on.

On December 2, 1773, representatives for the Colonial Legislature approached Captain John Viets, owner of a tavern nearby the mine, with an offer to be the prison keeper, which he accepted.

=== The prison pre-war ===
In December 1773 the prison received its first convict, John Hinson, sentenced to 10 years for burglary. Hinson was a career criminal who had spent time in half a dozen county jails.

After eighteen days' imprisonment, a snow storm struck. Around midnight, Viets went to check on his captive. Descending the ladder, he found Hinson’s bunk was empty and his few possessions were missing. It was later discovered that a female accomplice had braved the deep snow with a hundred-foot rope coiled around her shoulder. She lowered the rope down the eighty-foot well shaft, allowing Hinson to climb out.

In response, the General Assembly recommended a number of changes. Firstly, at least two guards were to watch the prison at night. The ventilating shaft in which Hinson had made his escape from was also to be covered with “stones about 15 to 18 inches square and of suitable length… secured with a strong iron gate, about six feet below the surface.” Further to this, it was decided that the prisoners were to be used as forced labor to extract ore.

In order to assist the convict workers, a number of expert miners were hired to work alongside them. However, this had an adverse effect, with the hired miners becoming friendly with the convicts and willingly entering into their escape plans with them.

=== American Revolutionary War ===
The build-up of tensions throughout the Thirteen Colonies on the eve of the American Revolutionary War saw Loyalists persecuted and targeted by local Patriots. Loyalists were assaulted in the streets, tarred and feathered, and their homes were raided and damaged.

With the eruption of conflict following the Battle of Lexington and Concord, suspicion of those suspected of Loyalist sympathies grew even stronger. Those persons alleged to have joined the enemy, robbed, or plundered were not to be considered prisoners of war, but convicted before the superior court and either sentenced to death, whipped, or imprisoned. By not obtaining the status of prisoner or war, a loyalist could not be pardoned, exchanged, or released. Patriotic leaders sought means to remove the more vocal loyalists from society and saw the answer in the ready-made prison at Simsbury.

At first, the number of Loyalist prisoners remained low with only five or six being incarcerated in the prison, often for numerous offenses. However, this changed and upwards of thirty to forty loyalists at a time begun to be imprisoned purely for their sympathies to the Crown, often facing charges of life imprisonment within the caverns.

The treatment of loyalists in the prison was no different from that of other convicted criminals. With up to a hundred inmates being held at one time, air circulation in such a confined space was limited. There was no natural light, no opportunities for inmates to wash, and communal toilet facilities. Among inmates, the prison was often referred to as “Hell”.

Mining was abandoned and the need for punitive work expanded their hard labor to include making hand wrought nails. Prisoners were bound in iron chains and forced into the compulsory construction of nails from 4am to 4pm. Lashes were dished out as punishment for disobedience.

For particularly unruly inmates, the prison possessed a solitary confinement cell. Situated at an area near the end of one of the passageways, the cell was consisted of bare rock and was twenty feet square with no light. In the middle of the cell was a rock with an iron bolt affixed to it, allowing for a prisoner's legs to be chained to it.

The psychological fear of the prison was itself used in order to torment Loyalists. Colonel Abijah Willard was denounced as a traitor and marched by a crowd several miles in the direction of the prison. The fear of imprisonment at Simsbury was enough for him to sign the crowd’s oath and beg for forgiveness.

==== Escapes ====
In spring 1776, a number of prisoners attempted to escape the prison by burning a wooden door which sat over the exit shaft. Hay had been smuggled for weeks where it was deemed to be sufficiently combustible. Upon lighting the hay, however, the damp conditions underground caused only a smolder instead. The smoke was enough to result in the death of one prisoner.

Despite the increase of prison security, now numbering 27 soldiers armed with muskets and cutlasses, another escape attempt occurred on May 18, 1781. While two officers were raising the shaft’s gate, it was violently heaved upward and the men, armed with rocks and scraps of metal, scrambled up the ladder into the blockhouse. The guards were overpowered and disarmed in the ensuing brawl. The escapees then captured the night duty guards as well as those sleeping. All guards, regardless of their condition, were then transported down into the prison, before the prisoners fled from the scene.

On November 6, 1782, the wooden buildings of the prison were destroyed by fire, allowing for another escape of inmates to take place.

Of all the inmates held in captivity in the prison during the war, it is estimated that approximately half absconded and escaped in some capacity.

With the signing of the Treaty of Paris in 1783 bringing a conclusion to the conflict, the new United States government lost interest in using the mine as a federal prison.

=== The prison post-war ===
In 1790, the site became a state prison. Most of the above-ground facilities present today were built between then and 1802. These include the main prison wall, a new workshop for the convicts, and five brick-and-masonry buildings, all of which now stand in ruins.

From nail making, the prison industry branched out to include coopering (making and repairing wooden vessels such as barrels), blacksmithing, wagon and plow manufacture, shoe making, basket weaving and machining. All were incorporated into the prison workforce.

Several more buildings were constructed: a large kitchen, several small factories, a hospital, quarters for female convicts, and a thirty-foot treadmill that was operated by twenty two inmates climbing paddle blades to grind grain.

Though the improvements were many, the jail remained a miserable facility. Men were chained and forced to march the treadmill, an overseer standing by with his whip ready. In 1824, a four-story building was erected containing offices, a granary, mess hall, and additional cells for fifty prisoners. The focus became punishment along with employment in producing commercial products to help offset prison operating expenses.

In 1827, the prison was closed and the remaining prisoners were transferred to the new Wethersfield State Prison.

== Post-prison activity ==
Attempts were made to reactivate the mines in the 1830s and 1850s, but these ventures failed and mining at the site was again abandoned.

The site was purchased by private owners who, for a price, provided candles and guided tours of the old prison for curious visitors. The site has been considered a tourist attraction since the 1860s. Prison tours were still carried out and to attract more visitors, a variety of attractions were eventually introduced – caged bears, antique cars, and a World War I tank.

The mine complex was acquired by the state historic commission in 1968. In the 1970s the state repurposed the old guardhouse for use as a visitors' center and interpretive museum, and took other steps to stabilize the ruins. Old New-Gate Prison was listed on the National Register of Historic Places in 1970, and was designated a National Historic Landmark two years later. They also constructed a sloping tunnel to provide visitors access via stairs to the mines. The museum and grounds was closed in 2009 for structural repairs, re-opening to the public on July 14, 2018.

The site is now owned and administered by the State of Connecticut as a museum. Nearby Peak Mountain offers a bird's eye view of Old New-Gate Prison from the Metacomet Trail.

== Tourist attraction ==
Today, Old New-Gate Prison is open for visitors typically between the months of May and October with events usually being held the months of September and October. The site features a large wooden pillory (often referred to as stocks) outside of the buildings entrance, allowing those visiting the opportunity to take a memorable photo.

Visitors are able to explore the prison courtyard, or they can take a guided tour provided by museum staff. A guided tour of the underground copper mine is offered, taking visitors through the mine. The underground tour involves traversing as low as 75 feet below ground, and includes tunnels as short as 4 feet high. The Connecticut state website provides potential visitors with a description of the conditions and terrain to be expected (such as not being accessible to wheelchairs, strollers, or walkers and involves multiple sets of metal stairs leading down to the mine). A virtual tour of the underground mine is also available.

== Popular culture ==
In the book Drums Along the Mohawk, John Wolff escapes from the prison.

In 2006, an episode of Treasure Hunters sent the contestants to the prison.

The prison features in an episode of the podcast Ben Franklin’s World in which its history and use during the American Revolution is explored.

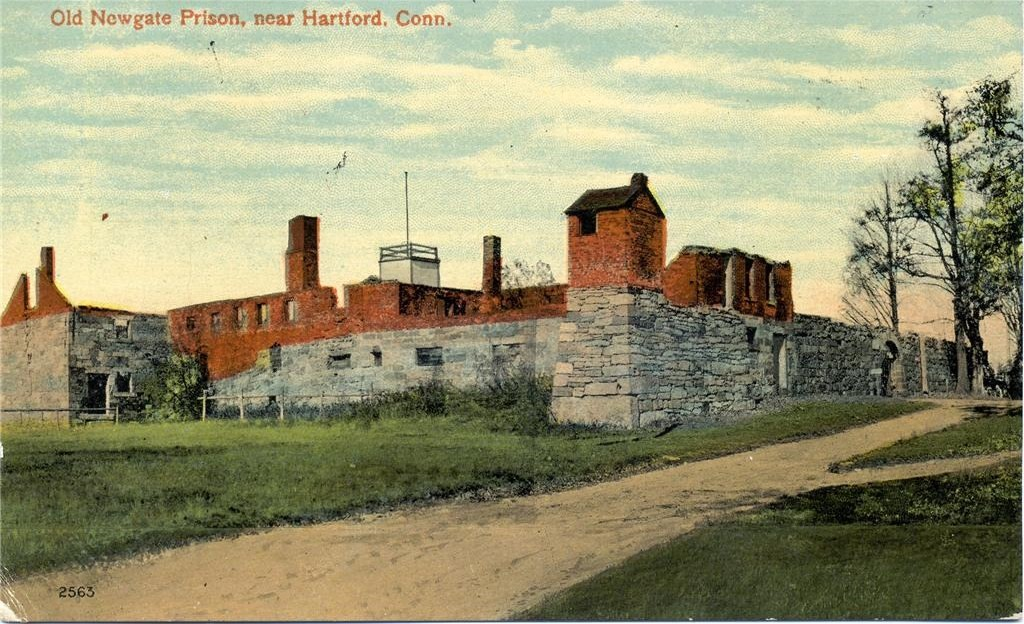
Postcard from late 1910s, early 1920s

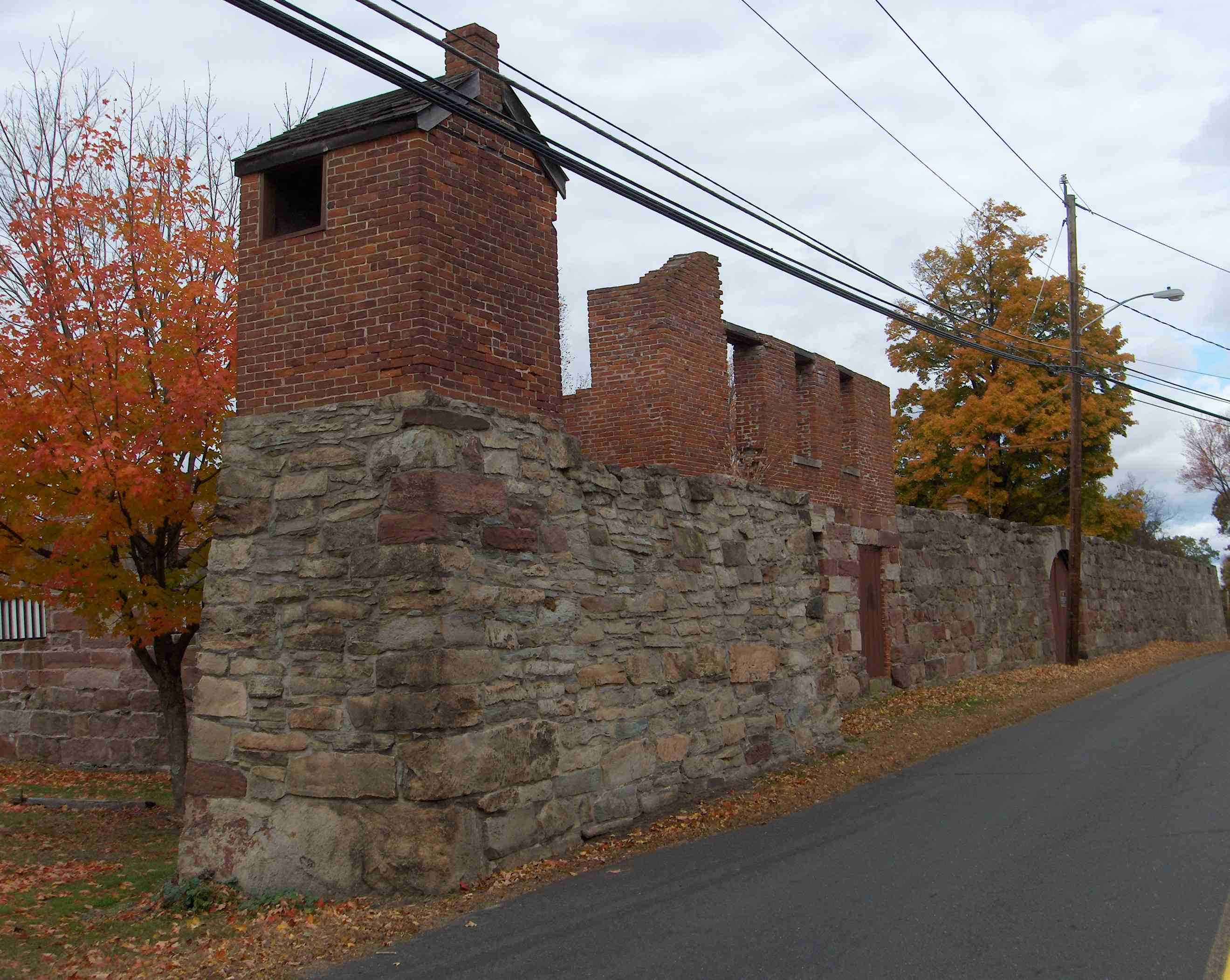
View of same wall as the postcard in 2010

== See also ==
- List of sites administered by the Connecticut State Historic Preservation Office
- List of National Historic Landmarks in Connecticut
- National Register of Historic Places listings in Hartford County, Connecticut
