= Solomon Flagg Alderman =

American lawyer and politician

Solomon Flagg Alderman (July 1, 1861 – January 9, 1928) was an American lawyer and politician.

Alderman was born in East Granby, Hartford County, Connecticut. He went to the Connecticut Literary Institute in Suffield, Connecticut. Alderman moved to Brainerd, Crow Wing County, Minnesota in 1883 and practiced law in Brainerd, Minnesota. Alderman served as the Brainerd Municipal Court judge. He also served as the Crow Wing County Attorney and the Crow Wing County District Court clerk. Alderman served in the Minnesota Senate from 1907 to 1910 and was a Republican.
