= Hatchett Hill =

Traprock ridge in the American state of Connecticut

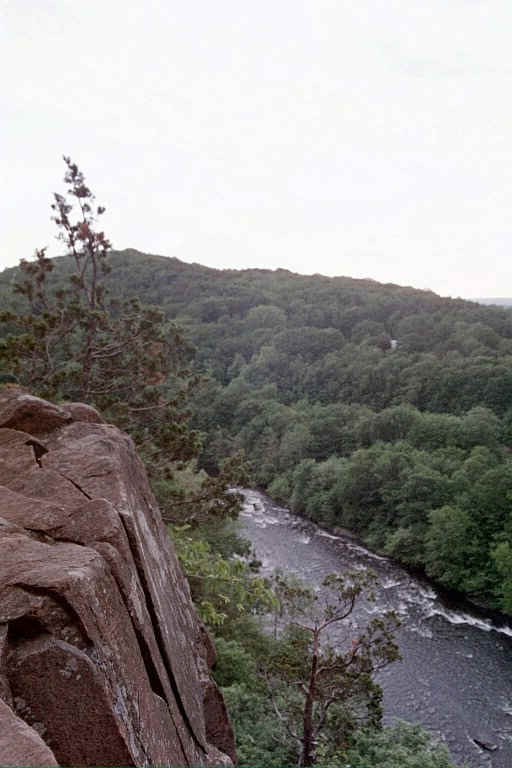
- Tariffville Gorge from Hatchett Hill

Highest point
- Elevation: 510 ft (160 m)
- Parent peak: 41° 54' 20"N, 72° 45' 29"W
- Coordinates: 41°56′15″N 72°44′53″W to 41°54′20″N 72°45′29″W

Geography
- Location: East Granby, Connecticut
- Parent range: Metacomet Ridge

Geology
- Rock age: 200 Ma
- Mountain type(s): Fault-block; igneous

Climbing
- Easiest route: Metacomet Trail

Hatchett Hill, est. 510 feet (160 m), is a trap rock ridge located in East Granby, Connecticut, 11 miles (18 km) north-northwest of Hartford, Connecticut. It is part of the narrow, linear Metacomet Ridge that extends from Long Island Sound near New Haven, Connecticut, north through the Connecticut River Valley of Massachusetts to the Vermont border. The southern edge of the ridge plunges nearly 200 vertical feet (61 m) into the Tariffville Gorge. The ridge is known for its rugged topography, unique microclimate ecosystems, rare plant communities, and as a seasonal raptor migration path. It is traversed by the 51-mile (82 km) Metacomet Trail.

== Geography ==
Roughly 2.5 miles (4.0 km) long by 0.75 miles (1.2 km) wide, Hatchett Hill is a collection of closely set tiered ridges and abrupt cliff faces with a high point of 510 feet (160 m). Its southern end is cut with steep cliffs at the Tariffville Gorge where the Farmington River gouges out a chasm between it and Talcott Mountain to the south. Also notable is Marsh Pond, a glacial kettle pond nestled in the center of the ridge. From Hatchett Hill, the Metacomet Ridge continues north as Peak Mountain and south as Talcott Mountain.

The northeast side of Hatchett Hill drains into the Connecticut River, thence to Long Island Sound; the rest of it into the Farmington River, thence to the Connecticut River.

== Geology and ecology ==
Hatchett Hill, like much of the Metacomet Ridge, is composed of basalt, also called trap rock, a volcanic rock. The mountain formed near the end of the Triassic Period with the rifting apart of the North American continent from Africa and Eurasia. Lava welled up from the rift and solidified into sheets of strata hundreds of feet thick. Subsequent faulting and earthquake activity tilted the strata, creating the cliffs and ridgeline of Hatchett Hill. Hot, dry upper slopes, cool, moist ravines, and mineral-rich ledges of basalt talus produce a combination of microclimate ecosystems on the mountain that support plant and animal species uncommon in greater Connecticut. Hatchett Hill is also an important raptor migration path. (See Metacomet Ridge for more information on the geology and ecosystem of Hatchett Hill).

== Recreation and conservation ==
Although among the shortest of notable peaks along the Metacomet Ridge, the sharp topography of Hatchett Hill offers a number of scenic vistas culminating in the overlook atop the Tariffville Gorge. Hatchett Hill is traversed by the Metacomet Trail, (maintained by the Connecticut Forest and Park Association), which extends from the Hanging Hills of Meriden, Connecticut, to the Massachusetts border.

The ridge is open to hiking, bird watching, snowshoeing and other passive pursuits.

The ecosystem and ridgeline of Hatchett Hill are most threatened by development and quarrying. In 2000, Hatchett Hill was included in a study by the National Park Service for the designation of a new National Scenic Trail now tentatively called the New England National Scenic Trail, which would include the Metacomet-Monadnock Trail in Massachusetts and the Mattabesett Trail and Metacomet Trail trails in Connecticut.

The East Granby Land Trust has played an active part in the conservation of Hatchett Hill and its viewshed.

== See also ==
- Metacomet Ridge
- Adjacent summits:

↓ South

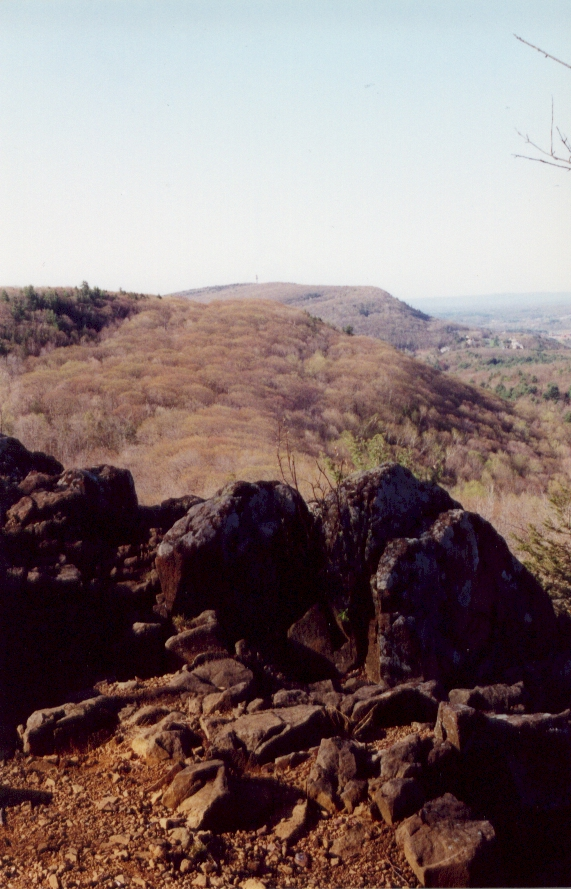
Talcott Mountain

North ↑

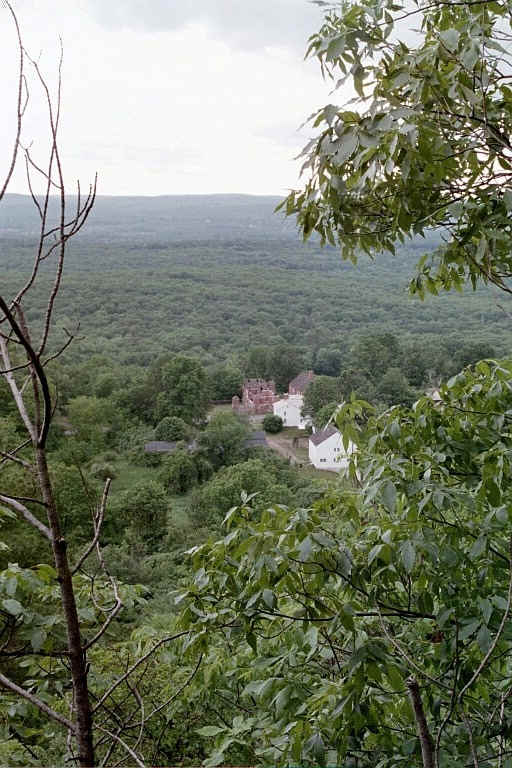
Peak Mountain
