= Viets' Tavern =

- U.S. National Register of Historic Places
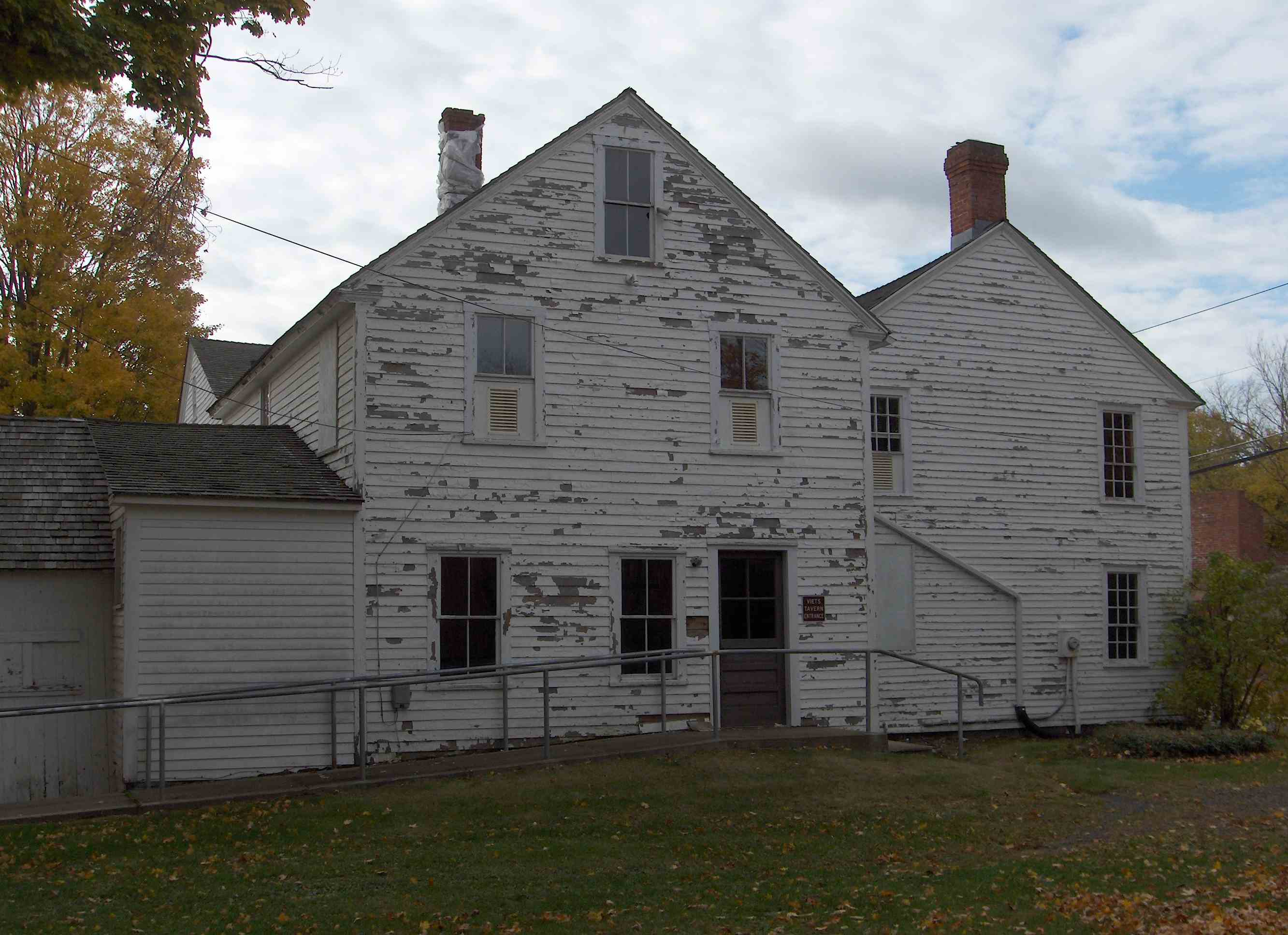
- North Side View

- Location within Connecticut Location within the United States
- Location: Newgate Road, East Granby, Connecticut
- Coordinates: 41°57′43″N 72°44′42″W
- Area: 2 acres (0.81 ha)
- Architectural style: Georgian
- NRHP reference No.: 72001338
- Added to NRHP: February 23, 1972

Viets' Tavern is an 18th-century tavern on Newgate Road, directly across the street from the Old Newgate Prison State Historical Site in East Granby, Connecticut. The building was home for many years to the prison warden, who also operated it as a tavern. It was listed on the National Register of Historic Places in 1972.

== Description and history ==
Viets' Tavern is located in a rural setting of Northern East Granby, set close to the East Side of Newgate Road opposite the former prison complex, now a state-run historic site. It is a two-story wood frame L-shaped structure, with a cross gabled roof and clapboarded exterior. The crook of the L is filled by a two-story frame addition, also with a gabled roof. Its main facade faces south, and is five bays wide. The bays are slightly asymmetrical in their placement, with the main entrance roughly at the center, framed by simple moulding. A secondary entrance is located at the north end of the four-bay street-facing facade. The interior includes several original fireplaces, as well as evidence of a ballroom space with cove ceiling on the second floor.

The date of the construction of this building is not known, but there are multiple references to a tavern at this location in historical records. In 1712, Dr. John Viets was granted a license by the town of Turkey Hills (now East Granby) to "keep a house of public entertainment." His son John also had a tavernkeepers licenses, and served as warden at the prison until his death by smallpox in 1777. Luke Viets, John's son, continued to operate the tavern until 1834, and it continued to be the site of traveler accommodations into the late 19th century. The Connecticut Historical Society has a photograph of an early 19th-century sign at the location with the date 1790, although the sign was destroyed in a 1904 fire.

During the prison's active period, the tavern was popular, not only with prison officials and visitors, but also some of the convicts.

== See also ==
- National Register of Historic Places listings in Hartford County, Connecticut
- List of sites administered by the Connecticut State Historic Preservation Office
