= Peak Mountain =

Traprock mountain in the American state of Connecticut

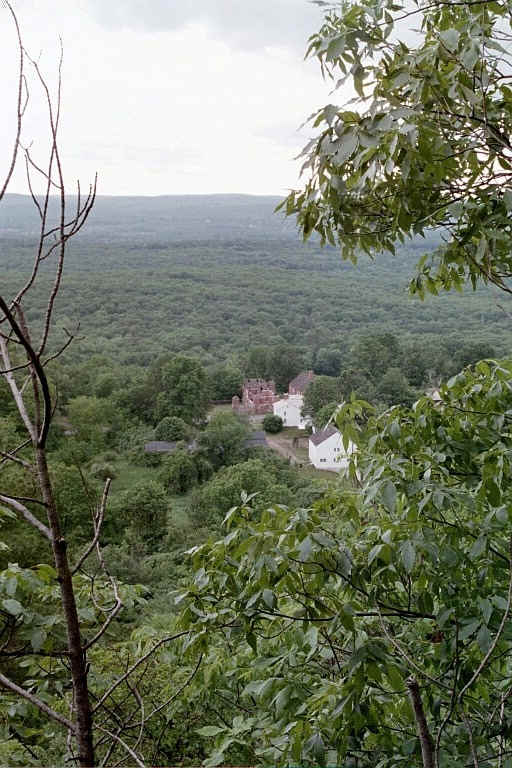
- Old Newgate Prison and Salmon Brook Valley from Peak Mountain

Highest point
- Elevation: c. 730 feet (223 m)
- Parent peak: 41° 58' 13"N, 72° 44' 24"W
- Coordinates: 41°58′13″N 72°44′24″W

Geography
- Location: East Granby, Connecticut
- Parent range: Metacomet Ridge

Geology
- Rock age: 200 Ma
- Mountain type(s): Fault-block; igneous

Climbing
- Easiest route: Metacomet Trail

Peak Mountain, also called Copper Mountain, est. 730 feet (220 m), is a traprock mountain located in East Granby, Connecticut, 6 miles (10 km) south of the Massachusetts border and 6 miles west of the Connecticut River. It is part of the narrow, linear Metacomet Ridge that extends from Long Island Sound near New Haven, Connecticut, north through the Connecticut River Valley of Massachusetts to the Vermont border. Peak Mountain is known for its expansive views from 200 feet (61 m) high cliffs overlooking the historic Old Newgate Prison, Congamond Lake, and the Salmon Brook Valley of north-central Connecticut. The mountain is also known for its microclimate ecosystems, rare plant communities, and as a seasonal raptor migration path. It is traversed by the 51-mile (82 km) Metacomet Trail.

== Geography ==
Roughly 3 miles (4.8 km) long by 1 mile (1.6 km) wide, Peak Mountain rises steeply 400 feet (120 m) above the Salmon Brook Valley to the west and the Connecticut River Valley to the east. The name Peak Mountain applies to the entire ridge while Copper Mountain may apply to the entire ridge or just a ledge, 672 feet (205 m), on the south side of the ridge. The Metacomet Ridge continues north from Peak Mountain to become West Suffield Mountain and south to become Hatchet Hill.

The west side of Peak Mountain drains into Salmon Brook, then into the Farmington River, thence to the Connecticut River and Long Island Sound; the east side drains into the Connecticut River.

Peak Mountain is located directly in line with the approach to Runway 15 at Bradley International Airport. In 1995, American Airlines Flight 1572 clipped trees near the summit while landing at the airport.

== Geology and environment ==
Peak Mountain, like much of the Metacomet Ridge, is composed of basalt, also called traprock, a volcanic rock. The mountain formed near the end of the Triassic Period with the rifting apart of the North American continent from Africa and Eurasia. Lava welled up from the rift and solidified into sheets of strata hundreds of feet thick. Subsequent faulting and earthquake activity tilted the strata, creating the cliffs and ridgeline of Peak Mountain. Hot, dry upper slopes, cool, moist ravines, and mineral-rich ledges of basalt talus produce a combination of microclimate ecosystems on the mountain that support plant and animal species uncommon in greater Connecticut. Peak Mountain is also an important raptor migration path; Hawkcount.org has recorded over 20 different species of raptor migrating via Peak Mountain including the bald eagle, American kestrel, golden eagle, and peregrine falcon. (See Metacomet Ridge for more information on the geology and ecosystem of Peak Mountain)

== Recreation and conservation ==
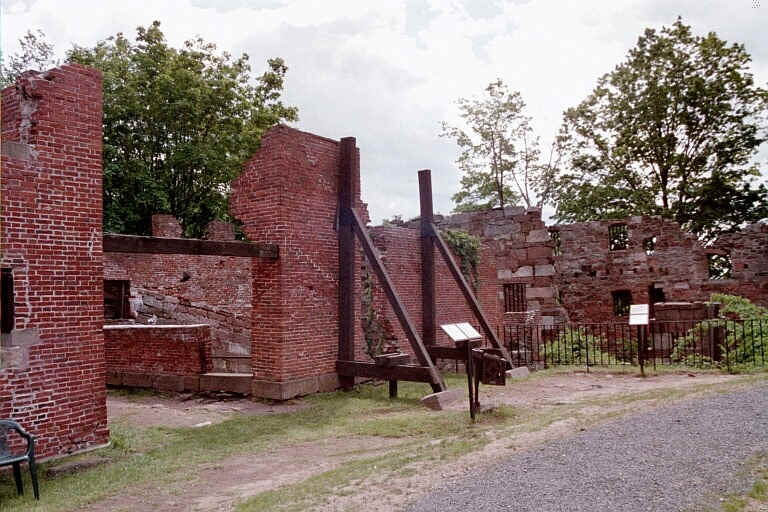
Old Newgate Prison

Peak Mountain is traversed by the Metacomet Trail, (maintained by the Connecticut Forest and Park Association), which extends from the Hanging Hills of Meriden, Connecticut, to the Massachusetts border. The mountain is open to hiking, bird watching, snowshoeing and other passive pursuits. Views from the summit include the Barn Door Hills and Manitook Mountain.

Peak Mountain provides a bird's eye view of Old Newgate Prison, managed as a tourist attraction since 1860, a pre-American Revolutionary War prison and copper mine. Old Newgate, a National Historic Landmark, was named after London's Newgate Prison. Old Newgate Prison is America's first copper mine and the first state prison in the United States. The ecosystem and ridgeline of Peak Mountain are most threatened by development and quarrying. In 2000, Peak Mountain was included in a study by the National Park Service for the designation of a new National Scenic Trail now tentatively called the New England National Scenic Trail, which would include the Metacomet-Monadnock Trail in Massachusetts and the Mattabesett Trail and Metacomet Trail trails in Connecticut.

The East Granby Land Trust has played an active part in the conservation of Peak Mountain and its viewshed.

== See also ==
- Metacomet Ridge
- Metacomet Trail
- American Airlines Flight 1572
- Adjacent summits:

↓ South

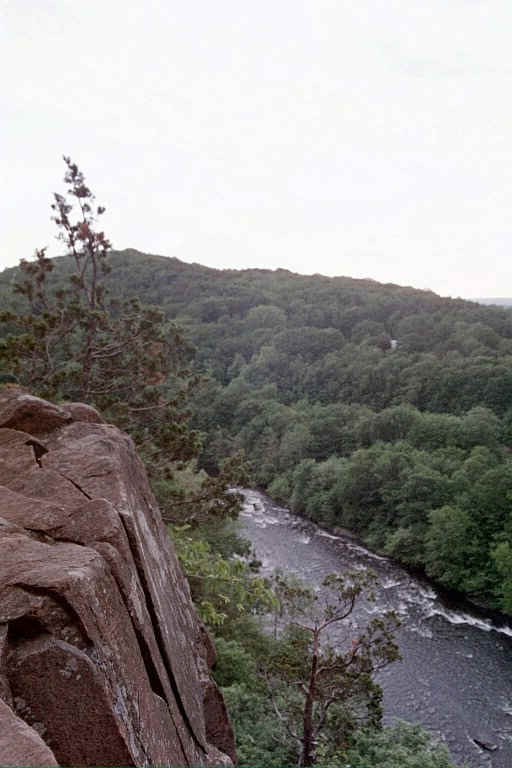
Hatchet Hill

North ↑

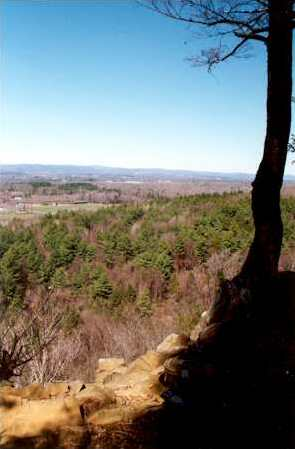
West Suffield Mountain
