= Ezekiel Phelps House =

Historic house in Connecticut, United States

- U.S. National Register of Historic Places
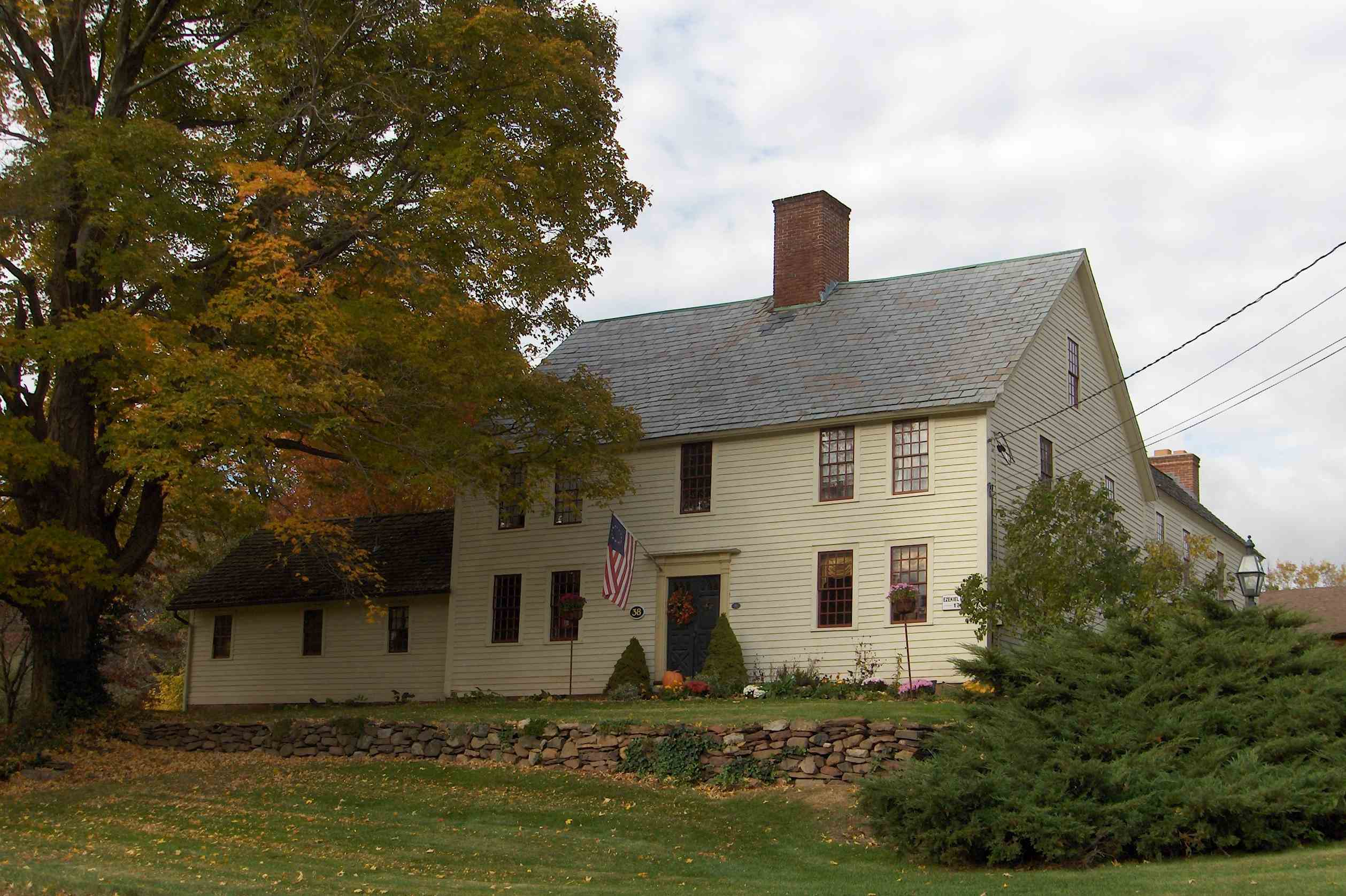

- Location within Connecticut Location within the United States
- Location: 38 Holcomb Street, East Granby, Connecticut
- Coordinates: 41°56′36″N 72°44′47″W
- Area: 5 acres (2.0 ha)
- Built: 1744
- NRHP reference No.: 82004396
- Added to NRHP: February 25, 1982

The Ezekiel Phelps House is a historic house at 38 Holcomb Street in East Granby, Connecticut. Built in 1744, it is a fine example of Georgian architecture, associated with a prominent local family. It was listed on the National Register of Historic Places in 1982.

== Description and history ==
The Ezekiel Phelps House is located west of the center of East Granby, on the west side of Holcomb Street south of Ezekiel Way. It is a 2 1/2-story wood-frame structure, with a gable roof, central chimney, and clapboarded exterior. The front doorframe is in the Federal style, with fluted pilasters supporting an elaborated corniced entablature. The entrance way, and panelled doors were not constructed for this house, but taken from a house in Litchfield. The interior follows a typical period center chimney plan, with parlors on either side of the chimney. The kitchen behind the chimney is larger than typical, as it incorporates one of the building corners that is often set off as a separate small chamber. The interior retains many original features, including wide pine floors and strap hinges on the doors, and Federal period fireplace mantels.

The house was built in 1744 by Joseph Phelps for his son Ezekiel, when the area was still part of Simsbury. Phelps was the great-great grandson of William Phelps, one of the first colonists of Windsor, which was one of the first English settlements in Connecticut. While serving in the militia during the Revolutionary War, one encampment was so close to the British that Phelps is reported to have said, "Shoot Straight: shoot to kill, not maim." Ezekiel served as a lieutenant in the Simsbury militia, and held a number of minor offices in town.

== See also ==
- National Register of Historic Places listings in Hartford County, Connecticut
