= Provin Mountain =

Mountain in Massachusetts, United States

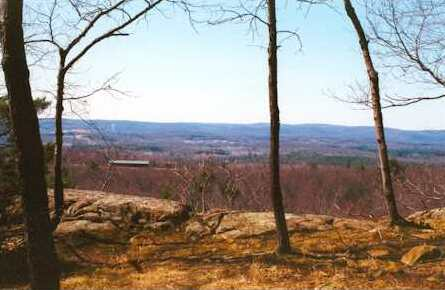
- View from Provin Mountain

Highest point
- Elevation: 600 ft (180 m)
- Coordinates: 42°06′20″N 72°41′42″W to 42°02′26″N 72°42′46″W

Geography
- Location: Westfield, Southwick, and Agawam, Massachusetts
- Parent range: Metacomet Ridge

Geology
- Rock age: 200 Ma
- Mountain type(s): Fault-block; igneous

Climbing
- Easiest route: Metacomet-Monadnock Trail

Provin Mountain is a very narrow traprock mountain ridge located in the Connecticut River Valley of Massachusetts. It is part of the Metacomet Ridge which extends from Long Island Sound near New Haven, Connecticut, north through the Connecticut River Valley of Massachusetts to the Vermont border. Provin Mountain is known for its scenic cliffs, unique microclimate ecosystems, and rare plant communities. It is traversed by the 114 mile (183 km) Metacomet-Monadnock Trail.

== Geography ==
Provin Mountain rises steeply between 200 and 450 feet (61 and 137 m) above the river valleys of the Connecticut River and Westfield River below, with a high point of 600 feet (183 m) above sea level. It is roughly 5 miles (8 km) long but is not much more than 0.5 miles (800 m) wide at its widest point. Although, the steepness of the terrain makes the actual square mileage much larger.

The Provin Mountain ridgeline extends from the Connecticut border (near the Suffield hamlet of Rising Corner) to the Westfield River on the tri-border of Westfield, West Springfield, and Agawam, Massachusetts. It lies within the towns of Southwick, Agawam, and Westfield. The Metacomet Ridge continues north from the Westfield River as East Mountain and continues south into Connecticut as West Suffield Mountain. The south side of the mountain drains into the Connecticut River, thence to Long Island Sound; the rest of the mountain drains into the Westfield River, thence to the Connecticut River.

The mountain hosts several underground reservoirs which augment the water supply of municipal Springfield.

== Broadcast transmission ==
Located at the summit of Provin Mountain is where the original studios and current transmitters for WWLP exist. WWLP first signed on from this location in March 1953. WWLP's studios remained there until 2000 when they were moved to Chicopee. The transmitter has remained there, as well as the current 475 foot (139 m) tower. WAQY, WHTX-LD, and WDMR-LD also maintain transmitters there. WUCS used to operate from this site as WPKX, prior to moving to Hartford in 2012. It is also home to numerous cellular, paging, and two-way radio users.

== Geology and ecology ==
Provin Mountain, like much of the Metacomet Ridge, is composed of basalt, also called traprock, a volcanic rock. The mountain formed near the end of the Triassic Period with the rifting apart of the North American continent from Africa and Eurasia. Lava welled up from the rift and solidified into sheets of strata hundreds of feet thick. Subsequent faulting and earthquake activity tilted the strata, creating the cliffs and ridgeline of Provin Mountain. Hot, dry upper slopes, cool, moist ravines, and mineral-rich ledges of basalt talus produce a combination of microclimate ecosystems on the mountain that support plant and animal species uncommon in greater Massachusetts. Provin Mountain is also an important raptor migration path. (See Metacomet Ridge for more information on the geology and ecosystem of Provin Mountain).

== Conservation and recreation ==
Provin Mountain is used for hiking, mountain biking, cross country skiing, hunting, and snowshoeing; many cliffs provide sweeping views of the rural countryside to the west and the urban landscape of metropolitan Springfield, Massachusetts to the east.

Threats to Provin Mountain and its unique habitats include suburban sprawl and quarrying. Although the northern edge of the mountain lies within Robinson State Park, much of the mountain is located on private land. Other landholders include local municipalities and conservation commissions. In 2000, Provin Mountain was included in a study by the National Park Service for the designation of a new National Scenic Trail now tentatively called the New England National Scenic Trail, which would include the Metacomet-Monadnock Trail in Massachusetts and the Mattabesett and Metacomet trails in Connecticut.

== See also ==
- Metacomet Ridge
- Metacomet Trail
- Adjacent summits:

↓ South

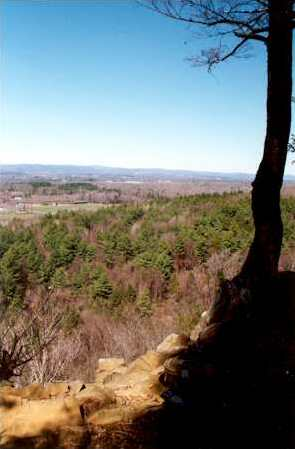
West Suffield Mountain

North ↑

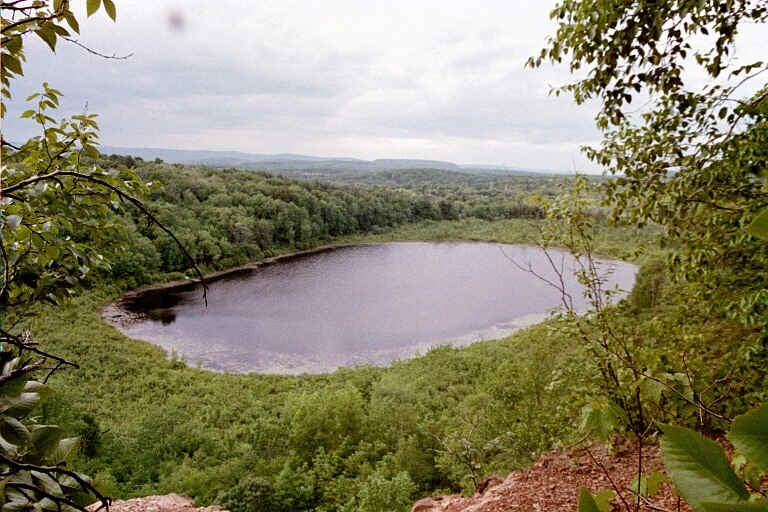
East Mountain
