= Eastmont =

Eastmont may refer to:

- Eastmont, California
- Eastmont, Washington
- Eastmont School District, Douglas County, Washington
- Eastmont Town Center, East Oakland, California

== See also ==
- East Mountain (disambiguation)
