= American Airlines Flight 1572 =

1995 aviation accident over Connecticut

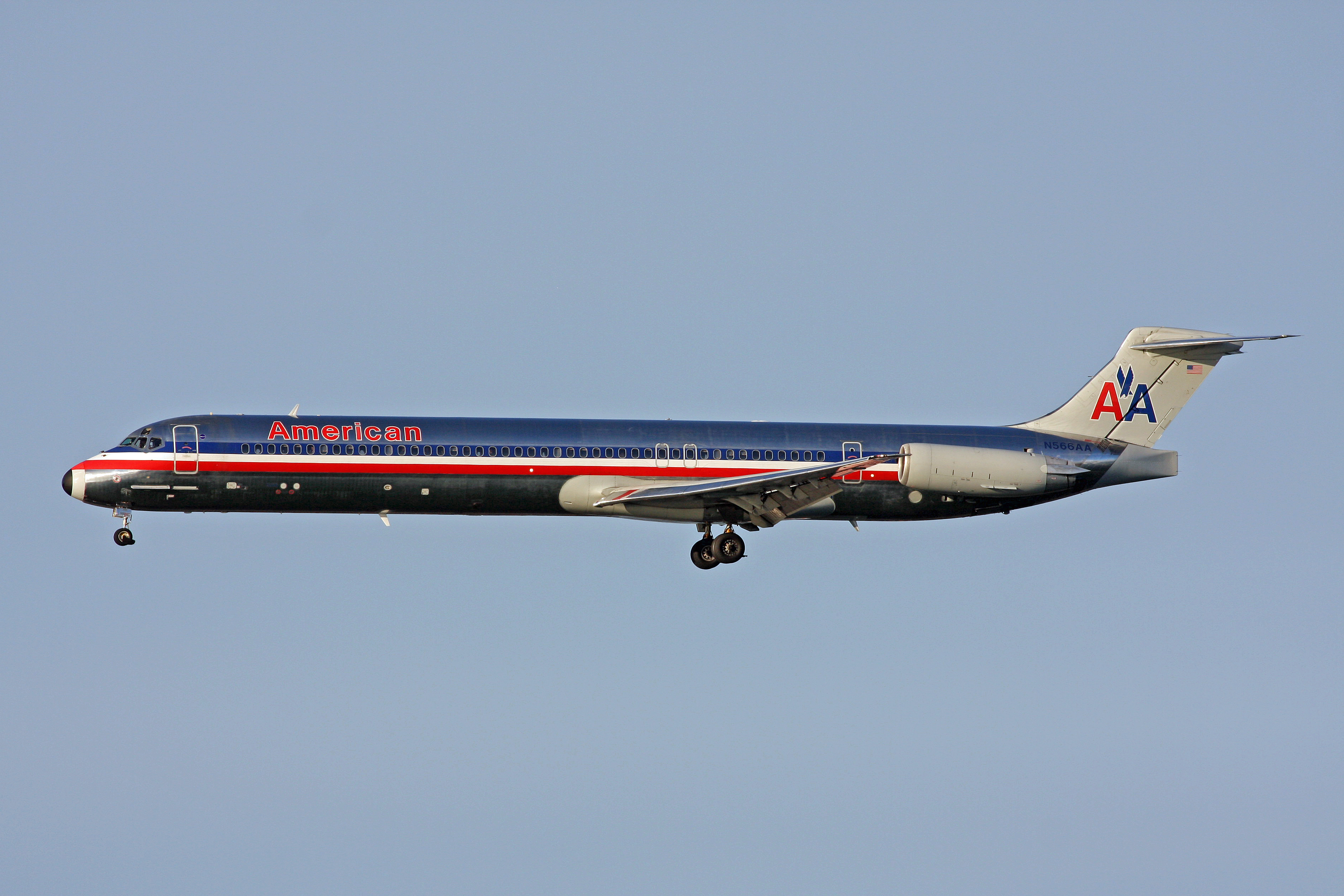
- N566AA, the aircraft involved in the accident, pictured on November 2007

Accident
- Date: November 12, 1995
- Summary: Controlled flight into terrain due to incorrect altimeter settings and pilot error
- Site: Peak Mountain, East Granby, Connecticut, United States; 41°58.22′N 72°44.38′W

Aircraft
- Aircraft type: McDonnell Douglas MD-83
- Operator: American Airlines
- IATA flight No.: AA1572
- ICAO flight No.: AAL1572
- Call sign: AMERICAN 1572
- Registration: N566AA
- Flight origin: O'Hare International Airport, Chicago, Illinois, United States
- Destination: Bradley International Airport, Windsor Locks, Connecticut, United States
- Occupants: 78
- Passengers: 73
- Crew: 5
- Fatalities: 0
- Injuries: 1
- Survivors: 78

American Airlines Flight 1572 was a scheduled flight from O'Hare International Airport to Bradley International Airport on November 12, 1995. The McDonnell Douglas MD-83 struck trees and an instrument landing system (ILS) antenna during landing, causing $9 million in damage to the aircraft; of the 78 occupants, only one passenger sustained minor injuries.

== Aircraft ==
American Airlines Flight 1572 was a regularly scheduled passenger flight from O'Hare International Airport in Chicago, Illinois to Bradley International Airport near Hartford, Connecticut. On November 12, 1995, Flight 1572 was operated using a McDonnell Douglas MD-83, a twin-engine, narrow-body jet airliner (registration N566AA). The aircraft was equipped with two Pratt & Whitney JT8D-219 engines. The MD-83 had accumulated a total of 27,628 flight hours at the time of the accident.

== Flight history ==
Flight 1572 was scheduled to depart from O'Hare at 21:25 Eastern Standard Time. Because of bad weather and delayed connecting passengers, however, the flight was delayed and did not depart until 23:05. While en route to Hartford, the flight crew, Captain Kenneth Lee (39), and First Officer John Richards (38), received an ACARS printout for the weather at Hartford. It noted an altimeter setting (reference atmospheric pressure) of 29.42 inches of mercury (996 hPa), adding that pressure was falling rapidly in the area. The flight cruised uneventfully from Chicago to Hartford, other than changing from 33,000 ft (10,000 m) to 35,000 ft (11,000 m) to avoid reported turbulence.

While on descent into Hartford, the pilots received a weather update at 00:30 that included a warning of wind shear and severe thunderstorms at Bradley. At 00:32, Flight 1572 was instructed by air traffic controllers to descend to 19,000 ft (5,800 m). At 00:33, controllers advised Flight 1572 to descend to 11,000 ft (3,400 m) and advised the flight to use an altimeter setting of 29.40 inHg (996 hPa) for Bradley. At 00:34, the first officer checked the Automatic Terminal Information Service (ATIS) automated weather broadcast for Hartford, and noted to the captain that the most recent ATIS broadcast was about 90 minutes old. For reasons unknown, the first officer entered 29.47 inHg (998 hPa) on the altimeter causing it to read approximately 70 feet (21 m) high. The captain checked the aircraft's weather radar before beginning the non-precision VOR approach to runway 15. Seeing no convective cells on the aircraft's path, he then turned the radar off.

At 00:49, while Flight 1572 was beginning its final approach, the crew was advised that the control tower was closing temporarily due to severe weather buckling a window inside the cab. The tower supervisor remained behind to assist the flight. The captain noticed the autopilot was having difficulty maintaining altitude and heading in the buffeting winds. Five miles from the airport the aircraft encountered heavy rain and some turbulence. The flight continued descending to 908 ft (277 m), the minimum descent altitude (MDA) for the approach. As the crew began to look for the airport, the aircraft continued descending.

At 00:51, winds at Bradley were measured as 170° at 25 knots (13 m/s), gusting to 40 knots (21 m/s), with an altimeter setting of 29.35 inHg (994 hPa) and falling rapidly. This information was not transmitted to the Bradley control tower until 00:57 and was not made available to the flight crew before landing. At the time of the accident, the correct altimeter setting was 29.15 inHg (987 hPa) instead of the 29.23 inHg (990 hPa) set by the pilots.

== Crash ==
At 00:55, the sink rate alarm went off, followed seconds later by a loud thump as the aircraft began shearing off treetops along Peak Mountain ridge. These trees were on a ridge with a ground elevation of 728 ft (222 m), and the first treetop struck was at a height of 770 ft (230 m). The captain advanced the throttles to full power, but the trees had been ingested into the engines causing them to flame out and shut down. The captain immediately lowered flaps to 40° hoping it would momentarily cause the aircraft to "balloon" upwards. While not standard operating procedure, this worked to a limited extent until the aircraft clipped a tree near the end of the runway. It then impacted the runway 33 ILS antenna equipment at the approach end of runway 15 before rolling to a stop.

The accident resulted in one minor injury to a passenger; the other 72 passengers and all 5 crew members escaped without injury. The accident resulted in $9 million in damage to the aircraft and over $74,000 in damage to airport equipment.

After the accident, N566AA was repaired and returned to service and continued to fly with American Airlines until being retired and stored in August 2017.

== NTSB investigation ==
The National Transportation Safety Board investigated the accident.

The investigation cited several causes for this accident. It cited pilot error as the primary cause due to the crew's failure to level off at no lower than the assigned minimum descent altitude (MDA) of 908 ft (277 m) for the approach, compounded by the first officer looking out the window instead of following procedure of announcing when the flight reached 100 ft (30 m) above MDA. The report also noted that – because pressure was falling rapidly – the approach controller at ATC should have provided an updated altimeter setting before signing off on his ongoing contact with the crew, and the crew should have specifically requested a more recent altimeter setting from the tower—the ATIS broadcast is normally updated hourly or whenever weather conditions change, and the first officer had noted that the ATIS recording was over 90 minutes old. While the crew was at fault for putting the plane below the MDA, the correct altimeter setting may have given them an inadvertent margin mitigating their error. Although turbulence, heavy rain, and wind shear affected the aircraft, the crew continued to allow it to descend while searching for the airport. However, the NTSB also credited the crew resource management and flight skills of the pilots with minimizing the severity of the accident once it was unfolding.

The NTSB also provided 13 recommendations to the Federal Aviation Administration (FAA) based on what it learned from this investigation, 12 of which apply broadly to the industry, and one specific to adjusting the approach design for Bradley International Airport's runway 15.

== In popular culture ==
The cockpit voice recording of the incident became part of the script of the play Charlie Victor Romeo.

The events of American Airlines Flight 1572 were featured in the 2022 episode "Tree Strike Terror", of the Canadian documentary TV series Mayday.

== See also ==
- Air Canada Flight 624, another flight that also impacted terrain on final approach, touched down short of the runway, then slid onto the runway with no fatalities
