= East Mountain (Massachusetts) =

Mountain in Massachusetts, United States

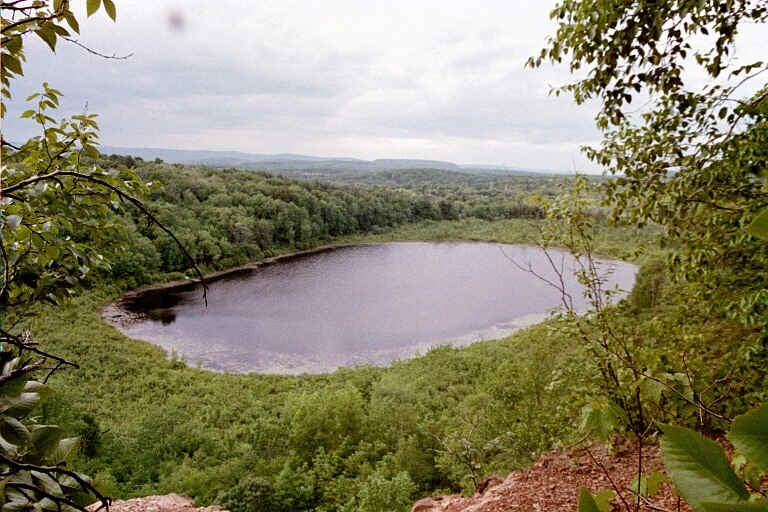
- View of Snake Pond from East Mountain

Highest point
- Elevation: 776 ft (237 m)
- Coordinates: 42°14′15″N 72°39′07″W to 42°06′23″N 72°41′41″W

Geography
- Location: Westfield, West Springfield, and Holyoke, Massachusetts
- Parent range: Metacomet Ridge

Geology
- Rock age: 200 Ma
- Mountain type(s): Fault-block; igneous

Climbing
- Easiest route: Metacomet-Monadnock Trail

East Mountain is a traprock mountain ridge located in the Connecticut River Valley of Massachusetts. It is part of the narrow, linear Metacomet Ridge that extends from Long Island Sound near New Haven, Connecticut, north through the Connecticut River Valley of Massachusetts to the Vermont border. East Mountain is known for its extensive scenic cliffs, unique microclimate ecosystems, and rare plant communities. It is traversed by the 110-mile (180 km) Metacomet-Monadnock Trail.

== Geography ==
East Mountain rises steeply between 350 and 650 feet (110 and 200 m) above the Connecticut River and Westfield River valleys below; it is roughly 9 miles (14 km) long and 1.5 miles (2.4 km) wide at its widest point, although the steepness of the terrain makes the actual square mileage much larger. The mountain includes many crests and tiered ridges, with a high point of 776 feet (237 m) above sea level. Various lakes, ponds and reservoirs are located on it, including Snake Pond, a mountaintop kettle pond.

East Mountain extends from the Westfield River on the tri-border of Westfield, West Springfield, and Agawam, Massachusetts to the base of Mount Tom in Holyoke; it lies within the towns of Holyoke, Westfield, West Springfield. The Metacomet Ridge continues north as the Mount Tom Range and south across the Westfield River as Provin Mountain. The west and south sides of the mountain drain into the Westfield River, thence to the Connecticut River and Long Island Sound; the north and east sides of the mountain drain into the Connecticut River.

Because the mountain is an important regional aquifer, numerous reservoirs have been constructed on it slopes; these facilities provide drinking water and emergency drinking water to surrounding towns and cities. They include Bearhole Reservoir, McLean Reservoir (formerly called High Service Reservoir), and Ashley Reservoir.

== Geology and ecology ==
East Mountain, like much of the Metacomet Ridge, is composed of basalt, also called traprock, a volcanic rock. The mountain formed near the end of the Triassic Period with the rifting apart of the North American continent from Africa and Eurasia. Lava welled up from the rift and solidified into sheets of strata hundreds of feet thick. Subsequent faulting and earthquake activity tilted the strata, creating the cliffs and ridgeline of East Mountain. Hot, dry upper slopes, cool, moist ravines, and mineral-rich ledges of basalt talus produce a combination of microclimate ecosystems on the mountain that support plant and animal species uncommon in greater Massachusetts. East Mountain is also an important raptor migration path. (See Metacomet Ridge for more information on the geology and ecosystem of East Mountain).

== Conservation and recreation ==
The mountain is used for hiking, mountain biking, cross country skiing, hunting, fishing, and snowshoeing. Although not a high mountain, it boasts more open ledge than any other mountain in Massachusetts, offering excellent views of the rural countryside to the west and the urban landscape of metropolitan Holyoke, Massachusetts to the east.

Threats to the mountain and its unique habitats and vistas include suburban sprawl and quarrying, which has been particularly damaging; the southern 1.5 miles (2.4 km) of the ridgeline have been nearly obliterated by quarrying operations. Although a large portion of the mountain lies within protected watershed lands, much of mountain is located on private land. Other landholders include hunting and fishing clubs and conservation commissions. In 2000, East Mountain was included in a study by the National Park Service for the designation of a new National Scenic Trail now tentatively called the New England National Scenic Trail, which would include the Metacomet-Monadnock Trail in Massachusetts and the Mattabesett Trail and Metacomet Trail trails in Connecticut.

== See also ==
- East Mountain (disambiguation)
- Metacomet Ridge
- Adjacent summits:

↓ South

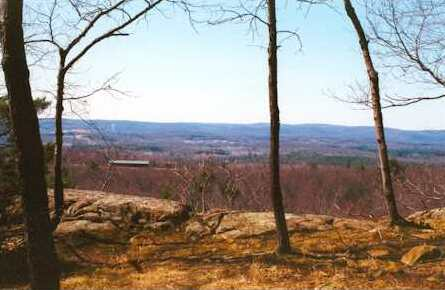
Provin Mountain

North ↑

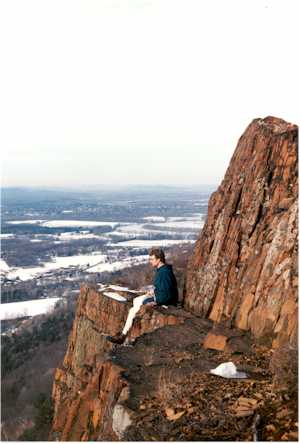
Mount Tom Range
