= Eric Sloane =

American illustrator and author

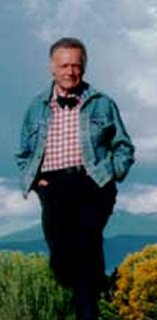
- Born: Everard Jean Hinrichs; February 27, 1905; New York, New York, US
- Died: March 5, 1985 (aged 80); New York, New York
- Occupations: Author, Painter
- Writing career
- Language: English

Eric Sloane (born Everard Jean Hinrichs) (27 February 1905 – 5 March 1985) was an American landscape painter, illustrator, and author of illustrated books on the cultural history and folklore of America.

== Life and career ==
Eric Sloane was born in New York. As a child, he was a neighbor of noted type designer Frederic W. Goudy. Sloane studied art and lettering with Goudy. In the summer of 1925, Sloane left home at the age of twenty to make a living for himself. Working his way across the country as a sign painter, he created advertisements for the likes of Red Man to Bull Durham. Unique hand calligraphy and lettering, developed during this period, later became a characteristic of his illustrated books.

While he attended the Art Students League of New York, he changed his name after his instructors George Luks and John French Sloan suggested young students paint under an assumed name so that their early inferior works would not be attached to them. He chose the first name "Eric," as a nod to "America" and the last name "Sloane" in honor of his greatest mentor.

Sloane eventually returned to New York City and settled in the Merryall area of New Milford, Connecticut, where he began painting rustic landscapes in the tradition of the Hudson River School. In the 1950s, he began spending part of the year in Taos, New Mexico, where he painted western landscapes and particularly luminous depictions of the desert sky. In his career as a painter, he produced over 15,000 works. His fascination with the sky and weather led to commissions to paint works for the U.S. Air Force and the production of a number of illustrated works on meteorology and weather forecasting. Sloane is even credited with creating the first televised weather reporting network, by arranging for local farmers to call in reports to a New England broadcasting station.

Sloane also had a great interest in New England folk culture, Colonial daily life, and Americana. He wrote and illustrated scores of books on Colonial-era tools, architecture, farming techniques, folklore, and rural wisdom. Every book included detailed illustrations, hand lettered titles, and his characteristic folksy wit and observations. He developed an impressive collection of historic tools which became the nucleus of the collection in the Sloane-Stanley Tool Museum in Kent, Connecticut.

He became friends with Andrew Wyeth, who was a fan of both his art and his writing. Wyeth said that he was amazed by Sloane's "unorthodox painting methods for creating textures and lines" in his paintings, and called him "an Artistic Treasure of Americana."

Sloane was married seven times. His last marriage, to wife Mimi, lasted from age 54 until his 1985 death in New York at age 80. He died from a heart attack while walking down the street to a luncheon held in his honor. A young woman who was a passer-by saw Sloane go into cardiac arrest as he held onto a parking meter before collapsing to the sidewalk; she telephoned for help from a nearby phone booth. The luncheon celebration being held in his honor marked the publication of his memoir published at age eighty, Eighty: An American Souvenir.

== Legacy ==
Sloane's best known books are A Reverence for Wood, which examines the history and tools of woodworking, as well as the philosophy of the woodworker; The Cracker Barrel, which is a compendium of folk wit and wisdom; and Diary of an Early American Boy: Noah Blake-1805, based on a diary he discovered at a local library book sale. His most famous painted work is probably the skyscape mural, Earth Flight Environment, which is still on display in the Independence Avenue Lobby in the Smithsonian's Air and Space Museum.

The Eric Sloane Museum & Kent Iron Furnace is operated by the state of Connecticut to showcase Sloane's original artwork, a reproduction of his studio, and his collection of early American tools. Sloane's gravesite is also located on the Museum's property in Kent, Connecticut.

== Bibliography ==
- Your Body In Flight: An Illustrated "Book of Knowledge" For the Flyer (1943)
- ABC Book of Early Americana: A Sketchbook of Antiquities and American Firsts (1963)
- American Barns and Covered Bridges (copyright 1954 by Wilfred Funk, Inc.)
- American Yesterday (1956)
- A Museum of Early American Tools (1973)
- An Age of Barns (1967)
- An Age of Barns - a Special Natural History Bonus (1976) (excerpted from An Age of Barns for the members of the American Museum of Natural History)
- A Reverence for Wood (1965)
- Camouflage Simplified (1942)
- Clouds, Air and Wind (1941)
- Diary of an Early American Boy: Noah Blake-1805 (1962)
- Eighty: An American Souvenir (1985)
- Eric Sloane's Do: A Little Book of Early American Know-how (1972)
- Eric Sloane's Don'ts: A Little Book of Early American Gentility by Oliver Bell Bunce (1968)
- The Do's and Don'ts of Yesteryear: A treasury of Early American Folk Wisdom (1975)
- Eric Sloane's Almanac and Weather Forecaster (1955)
- Eric Sloane's America (1982)
- Eric Sloane's Weather Book (1949)
- Eric Sloane, 1905-1985: Paintings & drawings : March 11 thru 30 (1991)
- Eric Sloane, NA, at Gilcrease: Exhibition May 1-July 6, 1982 (1982)
- Eric Sloane: East-West: Lands of Awareness (1984)
- Eric Sloane's I Remember America calendar (1977)
- Eric Sloane: An Artist's Legacy, Selected Paintings from Museum Exhibitions
- Folklore of American Weather (1963)
- For Spacious Skies: A Meteorological Sketchbook of American Weather (1978)
- Gremlin Americanus: A Scrap Book Collections of Gremlins (1943)
- I Remember America (1971, 1975)
- Legacy (1979)
- Look At the Sky and Tell the Weather (2004)
- Mr. Daniels and the Grange (with Edward Anthony) (1968)
- Once Upon a Time: The Way America Was (1982)
- Our Vanishing Landscape (1955)
- Recollections in Black and White (1974)
- Return to Taos: A Sketchbook of Roadside Americana (1960)
- Seventeen Dollars a Square Inch - a Personal Tribute to Eric Sloane, by Forrest Fenn. Publisher: One Horse Land & Cattle Company, Santa Fe(2007)
- Sketches of America Past (1958, 1995)
- Skies and the Artist (1950)
- Spirits of '76 (1973)
- The Book of Storms (1956)
- The Cracker Barrel (1967, 1979)
- The Little Book of Bells (1964)
- The Little Red Schoolhouse (1972)
- The Second Barrel (1969)
- The Sound of the Bells (1966)
- How You Can Forecast the Weather (1957)
- School Days: ABC Book of Early Americana/the Little Red School (1972)
