= Air Canada Flight 624 =

2015 aviation accident

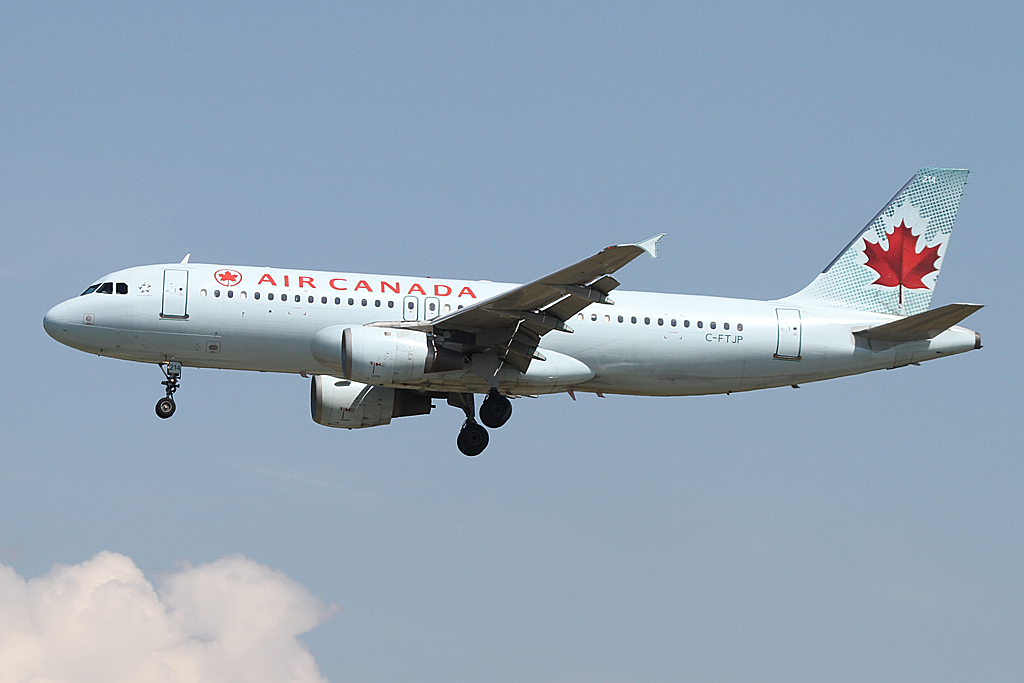
- C-FTJP, the aircraft involved in the accident, pictured in 2011

Accident
- Date: 29 March 2015
- Summary: Controlled flight into terrain in poor visibility
- Site: Halifax Stanfield International Airport, Nova Scotia, Canada; 44.8646°N 63.5284°W

Aircraft
- Aircraft type: Airbus A320-211
- Operator: Air Canada
- IATA flight No.: AC624
- ICAO flight No.: ACA624
- Call sign: AIR CANADA 624
- Registration: C-FTJP
- Flight origin: Toronto Pearson International Airport, Ontario, Canada
- Destination: Halifax Stanfield International Airport, Canada
- Occupants: 138
- Passengers: 133
- Crew: 5
- Fatalities: 0
- Injuries: 25
- Survivors: 138

Air Canada Flight 624 was a scheduled Canadian domestic passenger flight from Toronto Pearson International Airport to Halifax Stanfield International Airport in Halifax, Nova Scotia. During heavy snow and poor visibility, at 00:43 ADT (03:43 UTC) on 29 March 2015, the Airbus A320 landed short of the runway and was severely damaged. Twenty-five people were injured, two of them seriously.

== Accident ==
Air Canada Flight 624 departed from Toronto Pearson International Airport (YYZ) bound for Halifax Stanfield International Airport (YHZ). It was carrying 133 passengers and five crew. The Airbus A320 operating the flight, registration C-FTJP, impacted the ground 225 metres (738 ft) short of the threshold of runway 05 (which is not equipped for precision landing), smashing through an ILS-LOC antenna array. This impact caused the landing gear to separate from the aircraft. The plane also impacted a power line, which cut power to the airport. The aircraft then climbed an embankment up to the runway level, skidded on its belly and stopped 570 metres (1,870 ft) past the threshold. The Halifax airport was without electricity for about 90 minutes.

The aircraft was extensively damaged, having lost all landing gear and its port engine. The wings and tailplane were also damaged. Both pilots, twenty-three passengers and a flight attendant were taken to hospital. None of the injuries were life-threatening, and all but one of those taken to hospital were released the same day. The weather at the time of the accident was described as "stormy" (winter conditions). The loss of power to the airport was due to the aircraft clipping transmission lines before hitting the ground. Electricity was restored to the airport by 02:12 ADT.

While the aircraft collided with objects outside the airport perimeter and was damaged beyond repair, Air Canada initially described the accident as a "hard landing".

The aircraft was written off as it was substantially damaged.

== Aircraft and crew ==
The aircraft involved, manufactured in 1991, was an Airbus A320-211 registered as C-FTJP with serial number 233. It was equipped with two CFM56-5A1 engines.

The captain had been with Air Canada for more than nine years and had logged 11,765 flight hours, including 5,755 hours on the Airbus A320. The first officer had been with the airline for 15 years and had 11,300 flight hours, with 6,392 of them on the Airbus A320.

== Investigation ==
The accident was investigated by the Transportation Safety Board of Canada. Bureau of Enquiry and Analysis for Civil Aviation Safety (BEA) investigators from France and two technical advisers from Airbus travelled to Canada to participate in the investigation. As a result of the accident, Air Canada revised its incorrect Airbus A320-200 Standard Operating Procedure.

The final report was released in May 2017, and showed no mechanical faults contributing to the accident, but identified multiple contributing factors for the accident. Investigators determined that the airline's standard operating procedure in regard to the selected landing mode (Flight Path Angle Guidance) was over-reliant on the Airbus' automation and led to excessive loss of altitude. Per the SOP, the crew need not have monitored the aircraft's altitude or relation to the runway to make any subsequent adjustments to the flight path angle after the final approach fix. Subsequently, the captain and first officer failed to notice or respond to the fact that the aircraft autopilot selected a steep vertical angle flight path, causing a drop below the minimum safe altitude. Furthermore, limited visibility hampered the crew's ability to accurately perceive their surroundings.

== Litigation ==
A class action lawsuit was introduced against Air Canada, the Halifax Airport, NAV Canada, Transport Canada, Airbus and the aircraft's pilots which alleges that negligence on the part of the defendants caused the crash, inflicting physical and psychological harm onto the passengers. In December 2025, the class-action lawsuit was settled for $18 million.

On 30 March 2017, Air Canada filed a lawsuit against Airbus, alleging that the manufacturer "failed to identify shortcomings of the Airbus A320", which included uncommanded descent below the pre-programmed glide path.

== See also ==
- Accidents and incidents involving the Airbus A320 family
- Air Inter Flight 148, another Airbus A320-111 aircraft that crashed into the slopes of the Vosges Mountains in Eastern France while on a non-precision approach at Strasbourg Airport, killing 87 people.
- American Airlines Flight 1572, another flight that also impacted terrain on final approach, touched down short of the runway, then slid onto the runway with no fatalities
