= East Mountain =

East Mountain may refer to the following places in the United States:

== Elevations ==
- East Mountain (Massachusetts), in Hampden County
- East Mountain, a summit of the Brodie Mountain ridgeline, in Berkshire County, Massachusetts
- East Mountains (New Mexico), in Bernalillo County, Santa Fe County, and Torrance County, New Mexico
- East Mountain (Ulster County, New York)
- East Mountain (Utah), one of Utah's mountains
- East Mountain (Essex County, Vermont)

== Settlements ==
- East Mountain, Texas, a city in Upshur County
- East Mountain (Waterbury), a section of Waterbury, Connecticut

== See also ==
- Eastmont (disambiguation)
- East Mountain Teaching, school of Mahayana Buddhism in Tang China
