= Connecticut Antique Machinery Association =

Museum in Kent, Connecticut

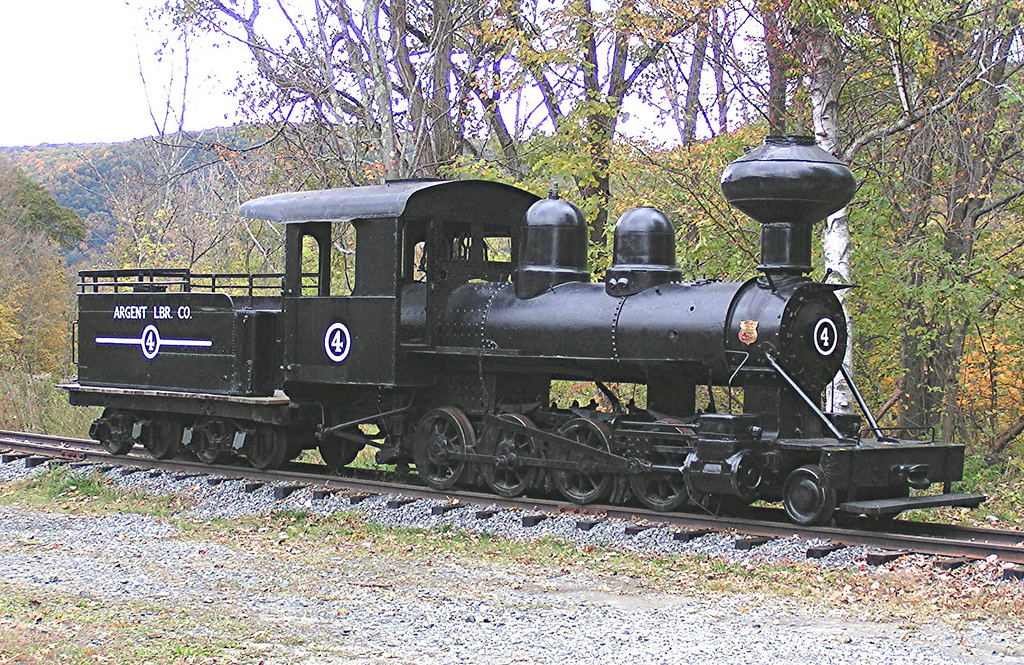
- A narrow gauge steam locomotive preserved at the museum
- Established: 1984
- Location: Kent, Connecticut
- Coordinates: 41.7386°N 73.4694°W
- Website: www.camamuseum.org

The Connecticut Antique Machinery Association is a museum that preserves historic machinery, located in Kent, Connecticut. The museum has a number of exhibits on industrial technology such as internal combustion engines, steam engines, agriculture, and logging. Included within the museum grounds is a 3-foot (0.91 m) narrow gauge railroad, with an operating steam locomotive originally from Hawaii.

== History ==
The museum originated from a local group of hobbyists, and first formed in 1984. It opened to the public in September 1985 on a 14-acre (5.7 ha) site in Kent, Connecticut.
