= East Granby, Connecticut =

- Town
- Town of East Granby
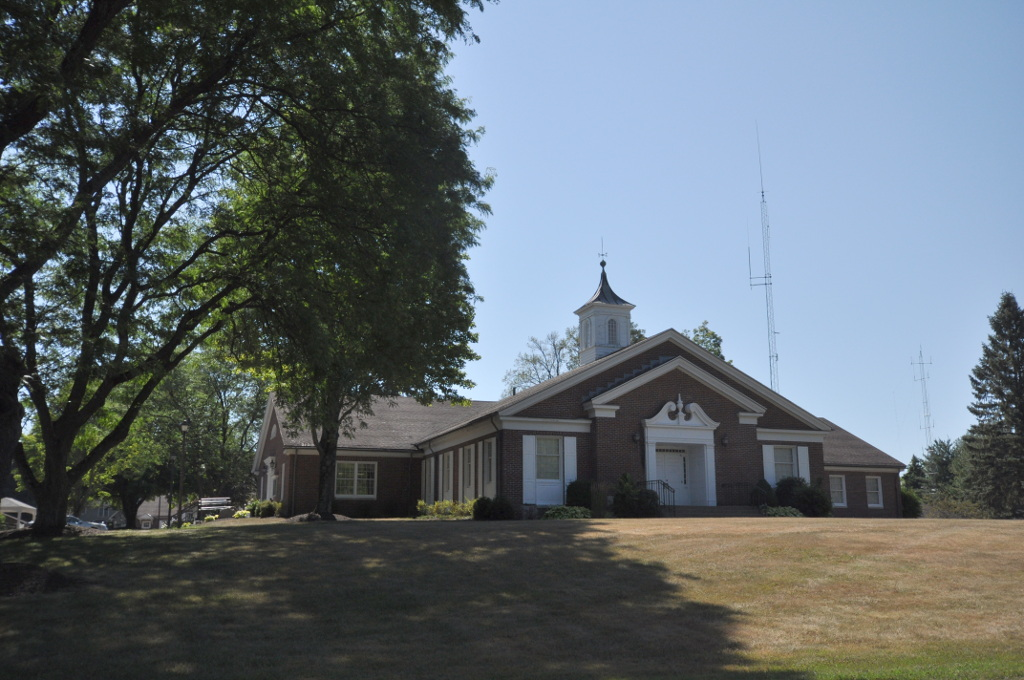
- East Granby Town Hall

- Seal
- Interactive map of East Granby, Connecticut
- Coordinates: 41°56′48″N 72°44′28″W
- Country: United States
- U.S. state: Connecticut
- County: Hartford
- Region: Capitol Region
- Incorporated: 1858
- Hamlets: East Granby; Floydville; Granbrook Park; Granby Station

Government
  - Type: Selectman-town meeting
  - First selectman: Eden Wimpfheimer (R)
  - Selectman: Joe Doering (D)
  - Selectman: Steven Hall (R)

Area
  - Total: 17.7 sq mi (45.8 km^{2})
  - Land: 17.6 sq mi (45.5 km^{2})
  - Water: 0.12 sq mi (0.3 km^{2})
- Elevation: 348 ft (106 m)

Population (2020)
  - Total: 5,214
  - Density: 297/sq mi (114.6/km^{2})
- Time zone: UTC−5 (Eastern)
  - Summer (DST): UTC−4 (Eastern)
- ZIP Code: 06026
- Area codes: 860/959
- FIPS code: 09-22070
- GNIS feature ID: 0213421
- Website: www.eastgranbyct.org

East Granby is a town in the Capitol Planning Region, Connecticut, United States. The population was 5,214 at the 2020 census.

== History ==
Original inhabitants of the current East Granby area were Native American peoples, including the Algonquin/Poquonock, the Massaco, and the Agawam.

The East Granby area was first settled by Europeans in 1664, which was one of the four Congregational parishes in Simsbury. The Turkey Hills Ecclesiastical Society in 1786 became a section of Granby, and in 1858 was incorporated as the Town of East Granby.

The first incorporated copper mine in America resided in what is now East Granby. The mine later became Old Newgate Prison, a Revolutionary War jail and the first state prison in the United States (1790).

Farming was the mainstay of the town for much of its history. The early twentieth century saw local farmers specializing in dairy product and tobacco.

East Granby experienced a housing boom that started in 1951 and resulted in a rise in population.

The town celebrated its 150th anniversary with a three-day festival June 7–9, 2008.

== Geography ==
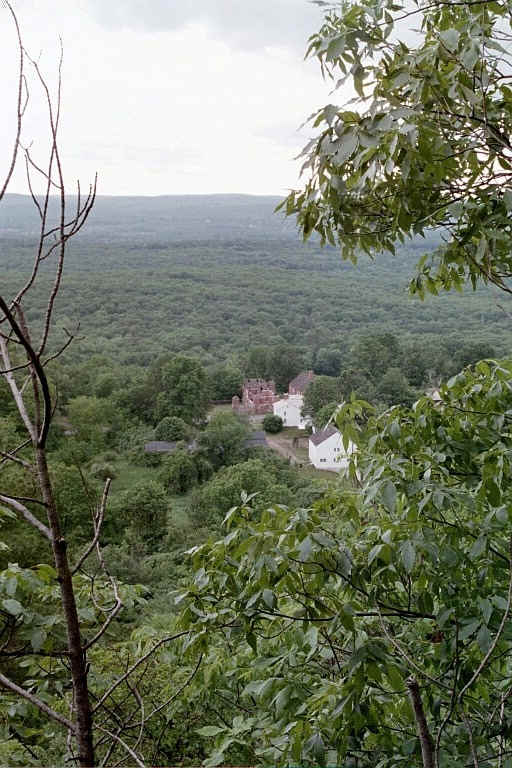
Old Newgate Prison from Peak Mountain

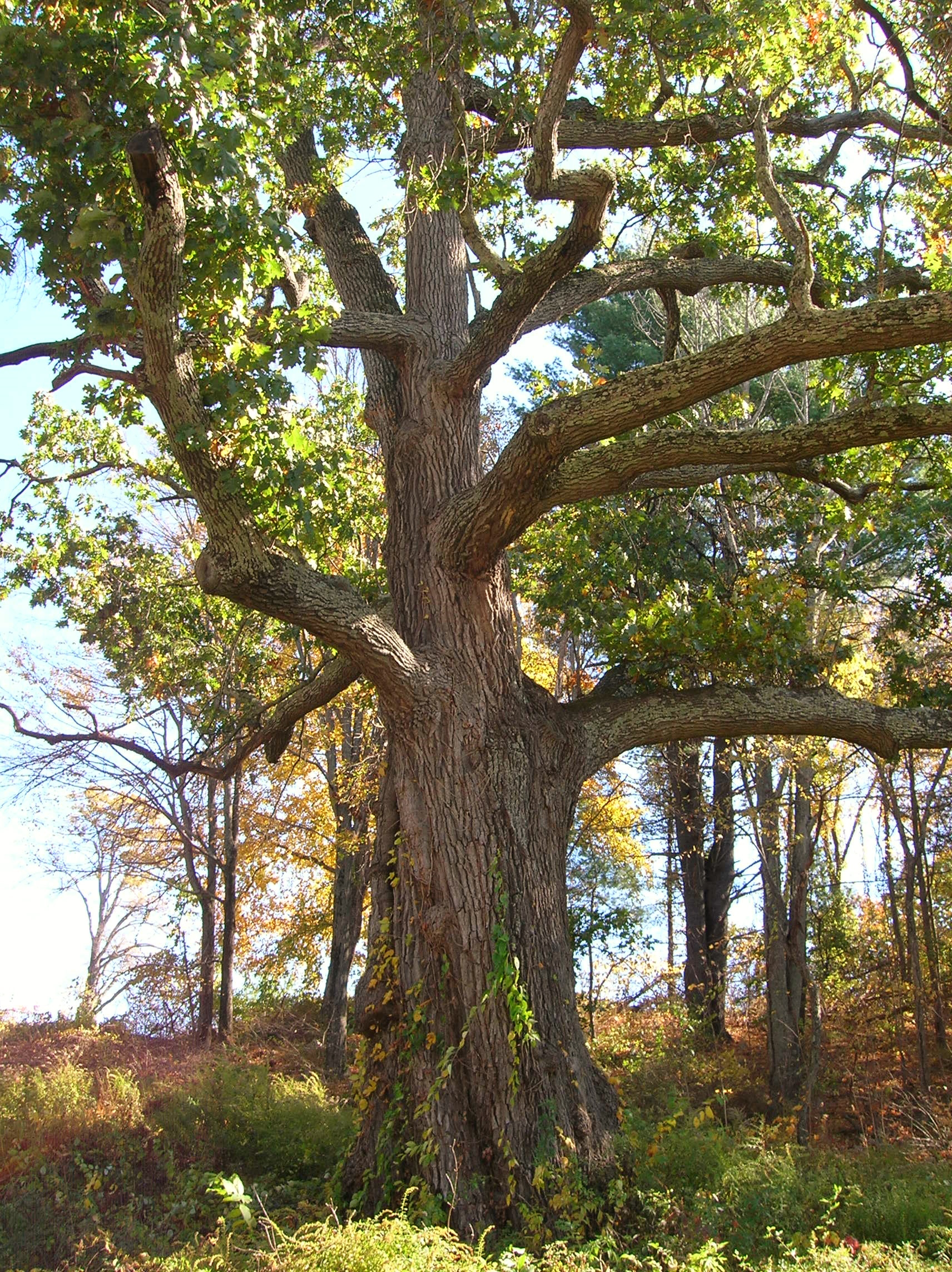
Black oak tree in East Granby

East Granby is in the Farmington valley, with the Farmington River passing along the southern border of the town. The Metacomet Ridge, a mountainous trap rock ridgeline that stretches from Long Island Sound to nearly the Vermont border, runs through the center of the town, cutting off Salisbury Plain to the east, which used to lie under the ancient, glacial Lake Hitchcock. High points on the Metacomet Ridge in East Granby include Hatchet Hill and Peak Mountain; the latter offers a bird's eye view of the historic Old Newgate Prison. The 51-mile (82 km) Metacomet Trail traverses the ridge.

== Demographics ==
Historical population
Census	Pop.	Note	%±
1860	833		—
1870	853		2.4%
1880	754		−11.6%
1890	661		−12.3%
1900	684		3.5%
1910	797		16.5%
1920	1,056		32.5%
1930	1,003		−5.0%
1940	1,225		22.1%
1950	1,327		8.3%
1960	2,434		83.4%
1970	3,532		45.1%
1980	4,102		16.1%
1990	4,302		4.9%
2000	4,745		10.3%
2010	5,161		8.8%
2020	5,214		1.0%
U.S. Decennial Census CERC Town Profile

As of the census of 2014, there were 5,055 people (2012) and 2,129 households (2012). The population density was 289 inhabitants per square mile (112/km^{2}) (2012). There were 2,186 housing units. The racial makeup of the town was 86.7% White, 5.28% African American, 0% Native American, 5.66% Asian, 2.35% from other races or multi-race residents. Hispanic or Latino of any race were 3.9% of the population.

The town the population was spread out, with 22.5% under the age of 18, 4.85% from 18 to 24, 35.55% from 25 to 49, 22.5% from 50 to 64, and 6% who were 65 years of age or older. 47.85% of the population is female (52.15% male). Residents that were 18 years or older compromised 77.47% of the population. 49.46% of residents that were 18 years or older were female (50.52% male). For every 100 females age 18 and over, there were 95.8 males. In 2000, the median age was 39 years.

As of 2000, there were 1,848 households, out of which 35.6% had children under the age of 18 living with them, 62.8% were married couples living together, 7.5% had a female householder with no husband present, and 26.7% were non-families. 22.1% of all households were made up of individuals, and 8.1% had someone living alone who was 65 years of age or older. The average household size was 2.57 and the average family size was 3.04.

=== Income and unemployment ===
As of 2000, the median income for a household in the town was $68,696, and the median income for a family was $77,621. Males had a median income of $48,992 versus $37,450 for females. The per capita income for the town was $30,805. About 0.9% of families and 1.5% of the population were below the poverty line, including 0.6% of those under age 18 and 3.2% of those age 65 or over.

Unemployment rates in 2013 were at 5.8% for East Granby residents, which was less than the state's unemployment rate of 7.8%. In 2014, 6 families were receiving temporary assistance and 154 individuals were receiving food stamps.

=== Education ===
As of 2012, residents' educational attainment was: 23% high school graduate, 12% associate degree, and 37% bachelor's degree or higher.

During the 2010–2011 School Year, total town school enrollment was at 939. Most public school students in East Granby attend the East Granby School District, which had 889 students. Schools include the East Granby High School.

== Historic sites and buildings ==
=== Historical buildings ===
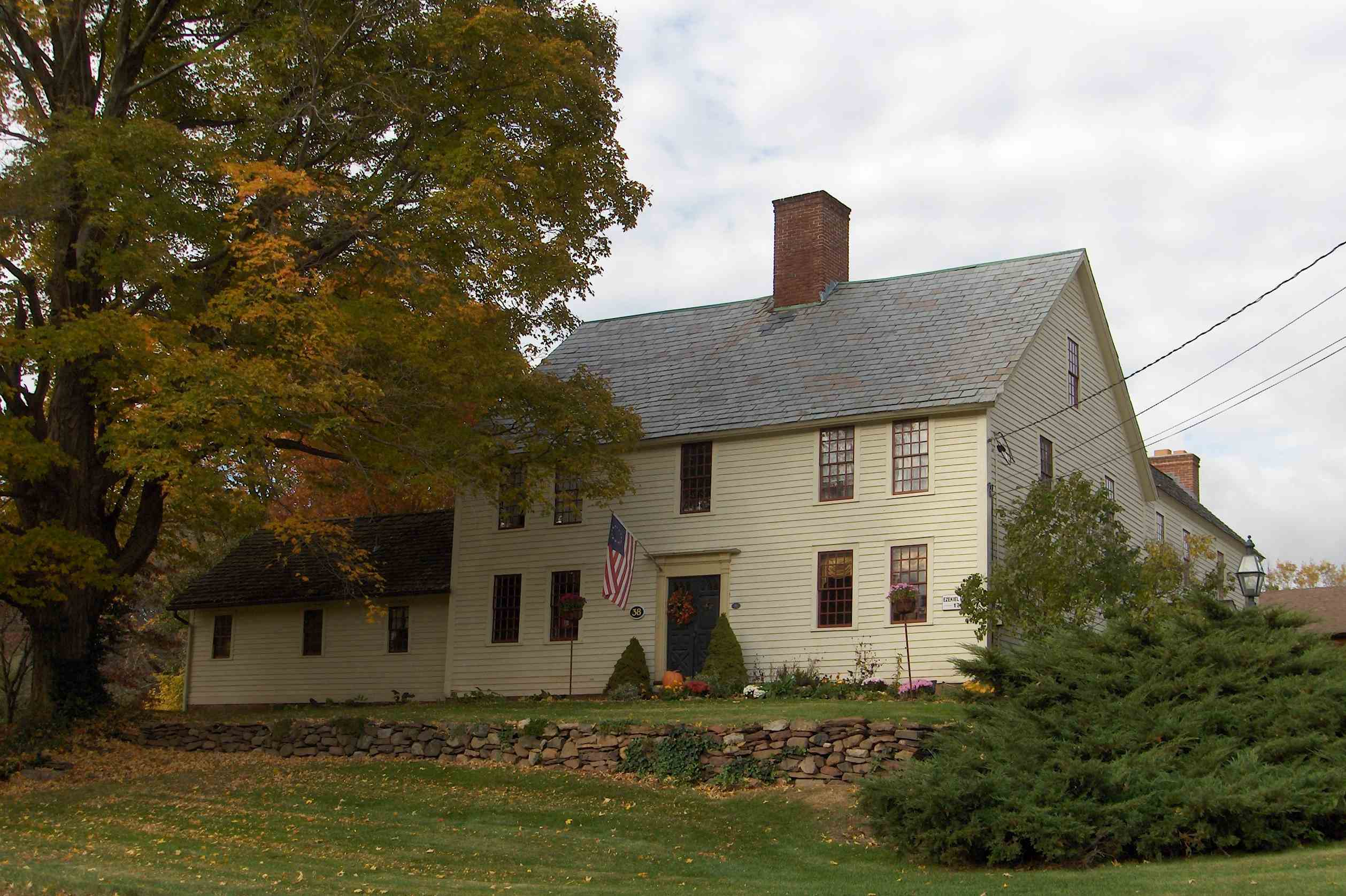
Ezekiel Phelps House

East Granby has six historical buildings. The East Granby Historical Society can be found on North Main Street.

- Clark Farm Tenant House
- Congregational Meetinghouse
- Ezekiel Phelps House
- Joseph Penney House
- Methodist-Episcopal Meetinghouse
- Old Newgate Prison
- Viets' Tavern - Newgate Road
- Whitfield Cowles House

=== Town cemeteries ===
East Granby has seven cemeteries. The oldest graves of East Granby can be found in the East Granby Center Cemetery, and dates back to 1737.

- East Granby Center Cemetery – Located Near East Granby Center On School Street. The East Granby Cemetery was established in 1722, and it is no longer active.
- Copper Hill Cemetery – Located In The Northwest Part Of Town
- Elmwood Cemetery – Located On Windsor Locks Road, 3/4 Mile East Of Town Center
- Holcomb Cemetery – Located Near The Granby Railroad Station
- Prisoners' Cemetery – Located near Old Newgate Prison.
- Smallpox Cemetery – Located at the top of the hill off Tariffville Road. The cemetery is on top of the "Manitank Mt." between Turkey Hill and Hatchett Hill, the property is owned by Tilcon-Roncari.
- Viets Cemetery – Located Near Old Newgate Prison. This cemetery is in a clump of trees and bushes in a field in back of the farmhouse belonging to Jenny W. Kellogg. It is about a mile down the road leading from the prison towards 107-3. The plot is perhaps twenty feet square. There are about twenty stones in it. Not one of them is inscribed. The prisoners were taken down here from the prison and buried according to the story told around here.

=== Old schoolhouses ===
East Granby has six old schoolhouses that are no longer in use.

- Center District Schoolhouse
- Copper Hill Schoolhouse
- Falls Schoolhouse
- Hazelwood Schoolhouse
- North Schoolhouse
- South Schoolhouse

== Government and politics ==
Voter Registration and Party Enrollment as of October 30, 2012
Party	Active Voters	Inactive Voters	Total Voters	Percentage
Democratic	1,086	114	1,200	28.80%
Republican	936	115	1,051	25.22%
Unaffiliated	1601	227	1,828	43.87%
Minor Parties	80	8	88	2.11%
Total	3,703	464	4,167	100%

Once strongly Republican, East Granby has become friendlier to Democrats in recent elections, similar to other suburban areas. In 2016, this was one of ten Connecticut towns to flip from Republican to Democrat, albeit giving Hillary Clinton a victory of only 18 votes. In 2020, Joe Biden won East Granby by a margin of more than 10 points.

East Granby town vote by party in presidential elections
Year	Democratic	Republican	Third Parties
2024	52.34% 1,678	45.60% 1,462	2.06% 66
2020	54.81% 1,789	43.05% 1,405	2.14% 70
2016	47.08% 1,389	46.47% 1,371	6.44% 190
2012	48.26% 1,389	50.31% 1,448	1.43% 41
2008	54.53% 1,612	44.08% 1,303	1.39% 41
2004	48.81% 1,353	49.71% 1,378	1.48% 41
2000	49.49% 1,254	44.75% 1,134	5.76% 146
1996	44.91% 1,093	39.11% 952	15.98% 389
1992	36.87% 952	38.92% 1,005	24.21% 625
1988	41.20% 950	58.24% 1,343	0.56% 13
1984	31.62% 720	68.07% 1,550	0.31% 7
1980	33.58% 739	47.84% 1,053	18.58% 409
1976	39.20% 815	60.27% 1,253	0.53% 11
1972	33.84% 619	64.74% 1,184	1.42% 26
1968	43.19% 628	51.44% 748	5.37% 78
1964	60.12% 814	39.88% 540	0.00% 0
1960	45.09% 533	54.91% 649	0.00% 0
1956	35.01% 257	64.99% 477	0.00% 0

== Notable people ==
- Solomon Flagg Alderman (1860–1928), Minnesota state senators and lawyer
- Walter Forward (1783–1852), lawyer and Secretary of the Treasury for President Tyler
- Jeff Simmons (born 1976), former IndyCar driver
- Walter Wick (born 1953), author of the I Spy find-it-in-the-picture book series

== Education ==
Education in East Granby is through the East Granby Public School System, including East Granby High School, the smallest public high school in the state of Connecticut. The high school mascot is a crusader, and the middle school's is The Purple Wave. Both the high school's and the middle school's colors are purple and white.

Average class size for students in kindergarten in the East Granby school system was 13.8, second grade 23.7, fifth grade 23, seventh grade 20.5, and high school 17.1. The students per computer ratios were: elementary 3.8, middle school 1.4, and secondary school 1.8. East Granby School students performed high on both the Connecticut Mastery Test (CMT) and SATs, where students' averages were higher than state averages in all grades (grade 4, 6, and 8 for CMT) and test subjects (Reading, Math, and Writing for both tests).

== In popular culture ==
East Granby was noted in the book The Black Box, a record of airplane CVR recordings. East Granby was the site of the American Airlines Flight 1572 incident, which clipped the tops of trees in East Granby as it came in for a landing at Bradley International Airport.
