= Betson =

Betson is a surname. Notable people with the surname include:

- Kevin Betson (1929–2012), Australian footballer
- Norm Betson (1914–1988), Australian footballer

== See also ==
- Bateson, surname
- Batson, surname
- Beatson, surname
