= Bateson =

Origin
- Meaning: "son of Batte"
- Region of origin: Anglo-Saxon

Other names
- Variant forms: Bate, Bates, Batey, Batson, Battey, Batts, Batty, Battye

Bateson is an English language patronymic surname meaning "son of Batte", a medieval diminutive of Bartholomew. It is rare as a given name. People with the surname Bateson include:

- Bob Bateson (born 1961), American football player
- Edith Bateson (1867–1938), English artist
- Frank Bateson (1909–2007), New Zealand astronomer
- Frederick Wilse Bateson (1901–1978), English literary scholar
- Gregory Bateson (1904–1980), British anthropologist (son of William Bateson)
- Jack Bateson (born 1994), British boxer
- Mary Catherine Bateson (1939–2021), U.S. writer and anthropologist (daughter of Gregory Bateson)
- Patrick Bateson (1938–2017), British biologist and science writer
- Paul Bateson (born 1940), American radiological technician who appeared in The Exorcist and was later convicted of a murder
- Thomas Bateson (c.1570–1630), English madrigal composer
- Thomas Bateson, 1st Baron Deramore (1819–1890), British Conservative politician
- Timothy Bateson (1926–2009), British actor
- William Bateson (1861–1926), British geneticist who coined the term "genetics"
- William Henry Bateson (1812–1881), British academic

== See also ==
- Bates (disambiguation)
- Beatson (disambiguation)
