= Batterson =

Batterson is a surname. Notable people with the surname include:

- Dim Batterson (1881–1935), American college and professional football coach
- Hermon Griswold Batterson (1827–1903), American Episcopal priest
- James G. Batterson (1823–1901), American designer and builder, owner of New England Granite Works, founder of Travelers Insurance Company
- Mark Batterson, American pastor and author
- John Batterson Stetson (1830–1906), American hatter

== Fictional characters ==
- Timothy Batterson, a character in Ninjago

== See also ==
- Batterson Block – High Street Historic District, Hartford, Connecticut, US
- Batterson Park, public park owned by the City of Hartford, Connecticut, US
- Bateson
- Batson
- Bötersen
