= Talcott Mountain =

Mountain in Connecticut, United States

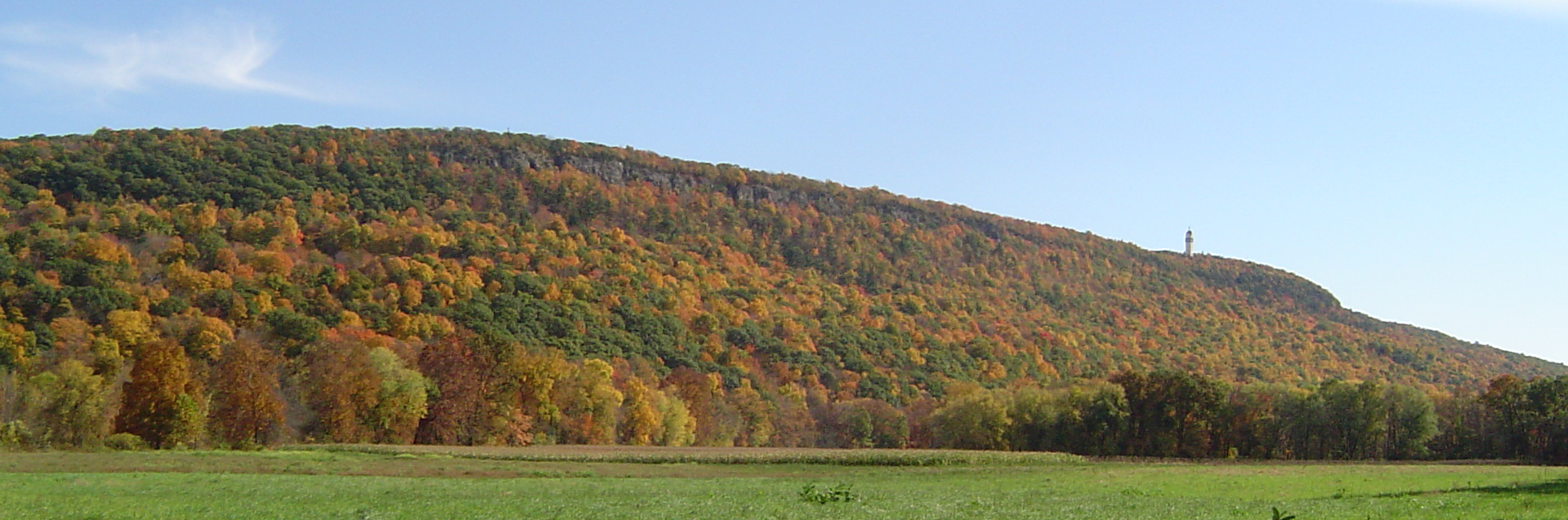
- Talcott Mountain cliffs from the Farmington River floodplain. Heublein Tower, top right.

Highest point
- Elevation: 950 ft (290 m)
- Coordinates: 41°43′32″N 72°48′43″W to 41°54′09″N 72°45′51″W

Geography
- Location: Farmington, West Hartford, Avon, Bloomfield, and Simsbury, Connecticut
- Parent range: Metacomet Ridge

Geology
- Rock age: 200 Ma
- Mountain type(s): Fault-block; igneous

Climbing
- Easiest route: Metacomet Trail

Talcott Mountain is a 950-foot (290 m) high point in central Connecticut, lying along a 13-mile (21 km) trap rock ridge 6 miles (10 km) west of the city of Hartford. A prominent landscape feature, the ridge forms a continuous line of exposed western cliffs visible across the Farmington River valley from Farmington to Simsbury. Talcott Mountain is part of the narrow, linear Metacomet Ridge that extends from Long Island Sound near New Haven, Connecticut, north through the Connecticut River Valley of Massachusetts to the Vermont border.

A popular outdoor recreation resource, Talcott Mountain is known for its microclimate ecosystems, rare plant communities, and expansive views from cliffs that tower up to 700 ft (213 m) above the surrounding landscape.

Talcott Mountain encompasses two state parks, several municipal recreation areas and reservoirs, a science center and school, a demonstration forest, and the historic Heublein Tower. The 51-mile (82 km) Metacomet Trail traverses the ridge.

== Geography ==
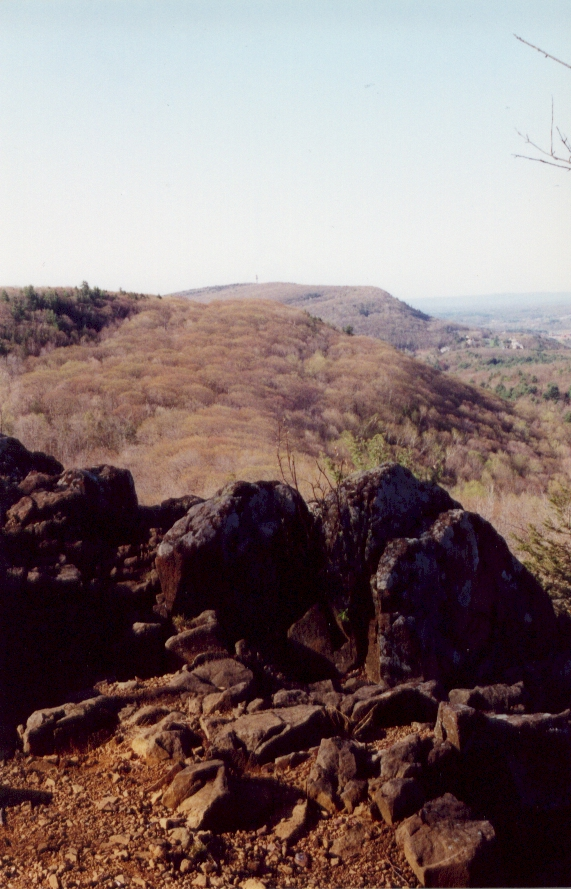
Talcott Mountain ridgeline from The Pinnacle in Penwood State Park

The Talcott Mountain ridgeline, located in Farmington, West Hartford, Avon, Bloomfield, and Simsbury, Connecticut, is composed of a tiered series of west facing cliffs punctuated by knobs and peaks. Two of the ridge tiers are distinct along most of the mountain's length; additional tiers manifest themselves over shorter sections of the mountain. Talcott Mountain is 3 miles (5 km) at its widest point. Notable peaks on the ridge include the high point, on which stands the historic Heublein Tower, 950 ft (290 m); Ely Mound, 820 ft (250 m), a conical peak south of the main summit overlooking Ely Pond; Kilkenny Rocks, 730 ft (223 m), an exposed ledge near the southern end of the mountain; King Phillip Mountain, 920 ft (280 m), just north of the main summit; Burnt Hill, 447 ft (136 m), a summit located on the southeast side of the mountain; and The Pinnacle (not to be confused with Pinnacle Rock of Plainville, Connecticut, also part of the Metacomet Ridge to the south), 737 ft (225 m), in Penwood State Park, just north of the centerpoint of the mountain.

Talcott Mountain is an important aquifer serving metropolitan Hartford and several other communities. Notable reservoirs and other bodies of water on the mountain include: Wash Brook Pond; Lake Louise, a glacial kettle pond with a swamp boardwalk, observation platform, and waterfall; Hartford Reservoirs #'s 1, 2, 3, 5, and 6; Hoe Pond; Ely Pond; Dyke Pond; and Woodridge Lake.

Talcott Mountain is traversed by the following roads (from east to west): Connecticut Route 4, U.S. Route 44, and Connecticut Route 185; and from north to south by: Connecticut Route 10 and U.S. Route 202. A network of suburban streets climb the southern slopes of the mountain, and a number of communications towers sprout from the summit peaks.

The Metacomet Ridge extends north from Talcott Mountain as Hatchet Hill and south as Farmington Mountain. The north and west sides of the mountain drain into the Farmington River, thence into the Connecticut River and Long Island Sound. The Farmington River runs along the west base of the mountain, cutting through the Metacomet Ridge between Talcott Mountain and Hatchet Hill at the Tarriffville Gorge. The east side of the mountain drains into the Park River, thence into the Connecticut River and Long Island Sound.

== Geology ==
Faulting

Talcott Mountain is a high point on the Metacomet Ridge, a fault-block ridge that formed 200 million years ago during the Triassic and Jurassic periods. It is composed of trap rock, also known as basalt, an extrusive volcanic rock. Basalt is a dark colored rock, but the iron within it weathers to a rusty brown when exposed to the air, lending the ledges a distinct reddish appearance. Basalt frequently breaks into octagonal and pentagonal columns, creating a unique "postpile" appearance. Huge slopes made of fractured basalt scree are visible beneath many of the ledges of Talcott Mountain; they are particularly evident along the base of the lower tier of cliffs west of Heublein Tower. The basalt cliffs are the product of several massive lava flows hundreds of feet deep that welled up in faults created by the rifting apart of North America from Eurasia and Africa. These basalt floods of lava happened over a period of 20 million years. Erosion occurring between the eruptions deposited deep layers of sediment between the lava flows, which eventually lithified into sedimentary rock. The resulting "layer cake" of basalt and sedimentary sheets eventually faulted and tilted upward. Subsequent erosion wore away the weaker sedimentary layers at a faster rate than the basalt layers, leaving the abruptly tilted edges of the basalt sheets exposed, creating the distinct linear ridge and dramatic cliff faces visible today.

== Ecosystem ==
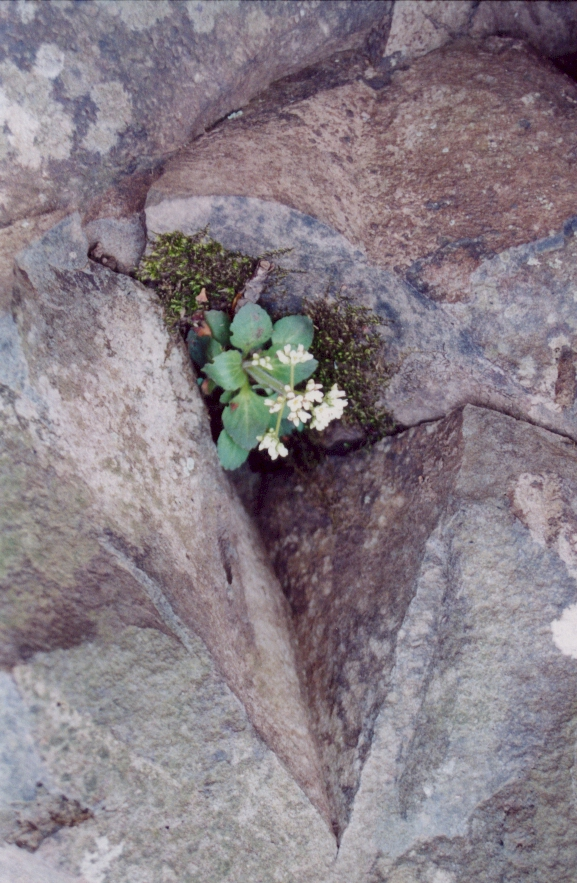
Early Saxifrage sprouting in a trap rock ledge, Talcott Mountain

Talcott Mountain hosts a combination of microclimates unusual in New England. Dry, hot upper ridges support oak savannas, often dominated by chestnut oak and a variety of understory grasses and ferns. Eastern red cedar, a dry-loving species, clings to the barren edges of cliffs. Cooler east-facing backslopes tend to support extensive stands of eastern hemlock interspersed with the oak-hickory forest species more common in the surrounding lowlands. Narrow ravines crowded with hemlock block sunlight, creating damp, cooler growing conditions with associated cooler climate plant species. Talus slopes are especially rich in nutrients and support a number of calcium-loving plants uncommon in eastern Connecticut. Because the trap rock ridges generate such varied terrain, they are the home of several plant and animal species that are state-listed or globally rare.

Infestation by an invasive species, the Hemlock Woolly Adelgid, resulted in the death of large stands of mature eastern hemlock in Penwood State Park on Talcott Mountain. The Connecticut Department of Environmental Protection began a program of removal of dead trees and contaminated living trees in 2000. The infestation and subsequent tree removal dramatically impacted the character of the forests on that part of the mountain.

The massive Pinchot Sycamore, a champion tree candidate with a trunk 25 ft (8 m) in diameter, is located at the foot of the mountain next to the Farmington River in Simsbury.

Talcott Mountain is also an important seasonal raptor migration path.

== Recreation ==
Talcott Mountain is a popular outdoor recreation resource among residents and visitors of the metropolitan Hartford region. The mountain boasts a substantial network of hiking trails, clifftop overlooks with expansive views over the rural landscape to the west, rugged woodlands, two small waterfalls, a highland swamp boardwalk, scenic ponds and reservoirs, and a number of active recreation facilities.

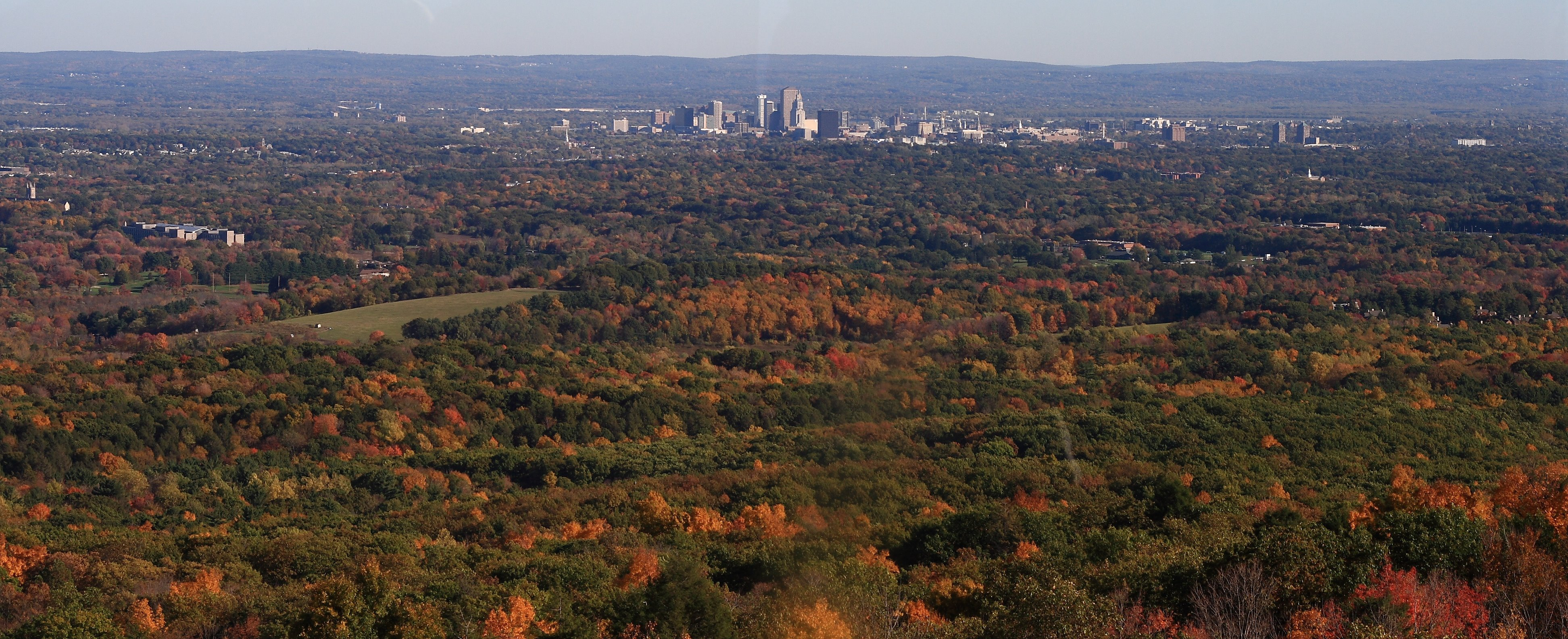
View of Hartford from Heublein Tower

Penwood State Park and Talcott Mountain State Park offer miles of paved and dirt park roads (open to pedestrian use only) and a network of trails including the 51 mile (80k) blue-blazed Metacomet Trail (maintained by the Connecticut Forest and Park Association). The parks are open to hiking, cross-country skiing, snowshoeing, picnicking, and other passive pursuits. Penwood State Park was donated to the state by Curtis H. Veeder, an industrialist, inventor, and outdoorsperson. Veeder wished the property to "be kept in a natural state so that those who love nature may enjoy this property as I have enjoyed it." He blazed many of the original trails in the park; Lake Louise, a scenic kettle pond atop the ridge, also called Gale Pond, was named after his wife.

The Metropolitan District Commission of Connecticut (MDC), a non-profit municipal corporation chartered by the state of Connecticut, manages more than 3,000 acres (12 km^{2}) on Talcott Mountain as public water supply, watershed, and open space. Besides providing drinking water, the MDC manages hiking trails and dirt roads (non-motorized use only) and practices silvaculture in the property's forests. MDC lands are open to hiking, picnicking, cross-country skiing, snowshoeing, bicycling, mountain biking, and other passive activities. The MDC also manages an interpretive trail and has been active in helping to establish bald eagle populations on the property. Swimming, boating, hunting and fishing are prohibited on MDC lands.

Batterson Park, an urban park located on the southeast side of the mountain in West Hartford next to Hartford Reservoir #1, offers a baseball field, picnic areas, playgrounds, a fresh swimming pond, and a boat launch. The towns of Bloomfield and Simsbury own considerable acreage on the northeast and northwest sides of the mountain including town parks and watershed lands. The town of Farmington owns part of Burnt Hill on the southeast side of the mountain; a rough trail navigates it. The town of Avon owns park space on the west side of the mountain as well as significant frontage on the Farmington River at the base of the mountain.

=== Heublein Tower ===
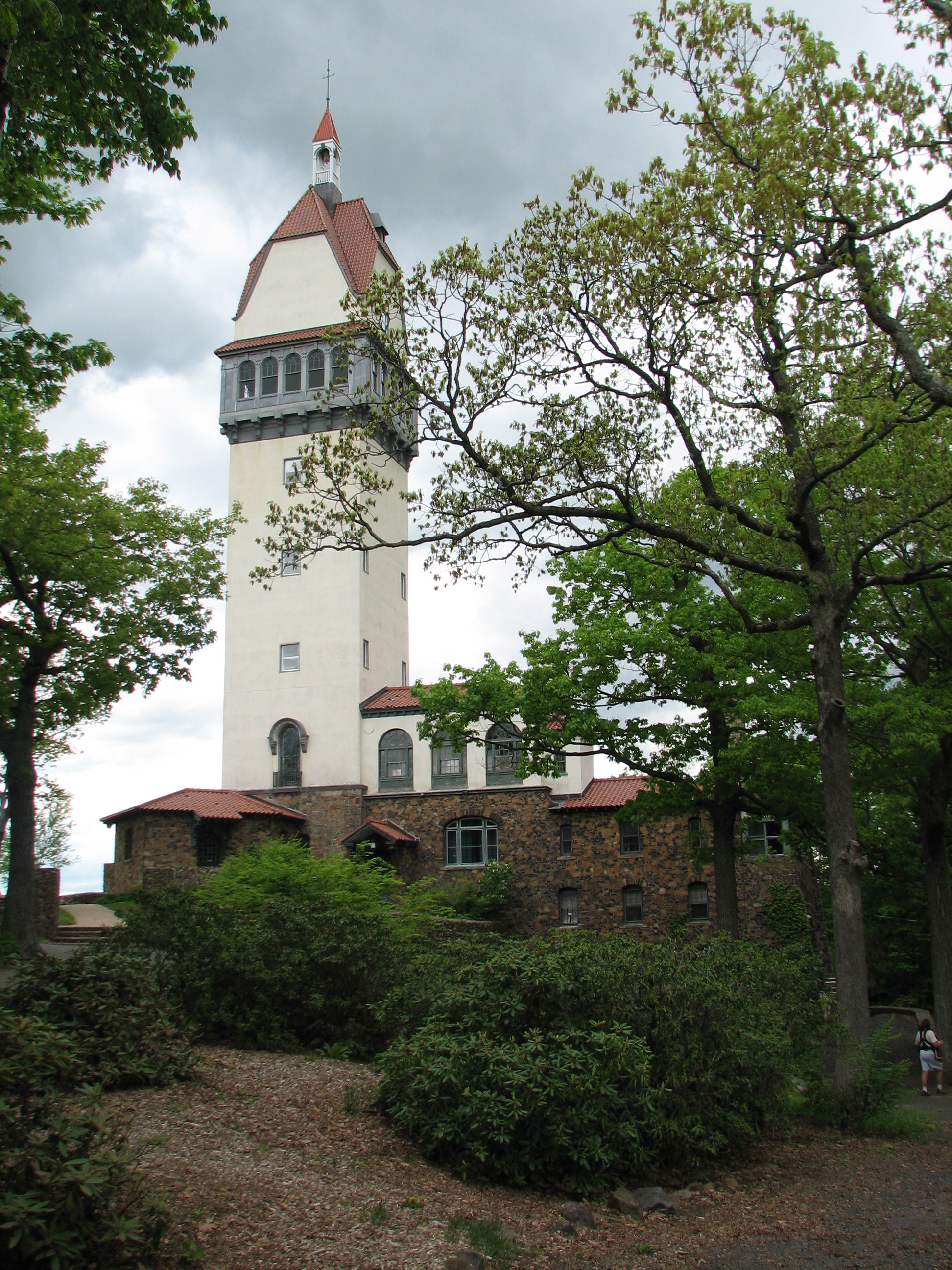
Heublein Tower

The centerpiece of Talcott Mountain State Park is Heublein Tower, accessible to the general public by hiking trail only (1.25 miles (2.01 km), 30 to 40 minute hike). The tower, 165 ft (50 m) tall and 1,040 ft (317 m) above sea level, built for Gilbert F. Hueblein in 1914 as a summer retreat and home, was designed to withstand winds of 100 mph (160 km/h). Ownership of the property passed to the Hartford Times newspaper during World War II, and, in the 1950s, was used primarily as a radio beacon. Put up for sale in the 1960s and slated for residential development, the tower became part of the Talcott Mountain State Park in 1965 through the efforts of conservation non-profit groups, the state of Connecticut and the United States government. The tower has been renovated as a museum with period artifacts and furnishings. Visitors may climb to the top of the tower for a 360° view encompassing four states. The tower is open for tours Memorial Day to Labor Day, Thursday through Sunday, 10 am to 5 pm; Labor Day through the end of October, 10 am to 5 pm.

== Conservation and education ==
Talcott Mountain and its ecosystems are most threatened by suburban sprawl and ridgetop home building. Although extensive tracts of the mountain have been conserved as state park, municipal water supply, or conservation easement, private landowners also hold significant acreage, particularly on the southwest side of the mountain where upscale homes dot the ridge crest, and also on the lower slopes of the north and west sides of the mountain.

In 2000, Talcott Mountain was included in a study by the National Park Service for the designation of a new National Scenic Trail now tentatively called the New England National Scenic Trail, which would include the Metacomet-Monadnock Trail in Massachusetts, and the Mattabesett Trail and Metacomet Trail in Connecticut.

The Talcott Mountain Science Center, a regional non-profit education and research facility, located atop the ridge, offers a variety of programs including geology, ecology, astronomy, and meteorology geared toward children.

A number of regional and local non-profit organizations are active in conserving the landscape and ecosystems of Talcott Mountain, most notably the Connecticut Forest and Park Association, Simsbury Land Trust, Avon Land Trust and the Farmington Land Trust.

== See also ==
- Metacomet Ridge
- Metacomet Trail
- Farmington River
- Adjacent summits:

↓ South

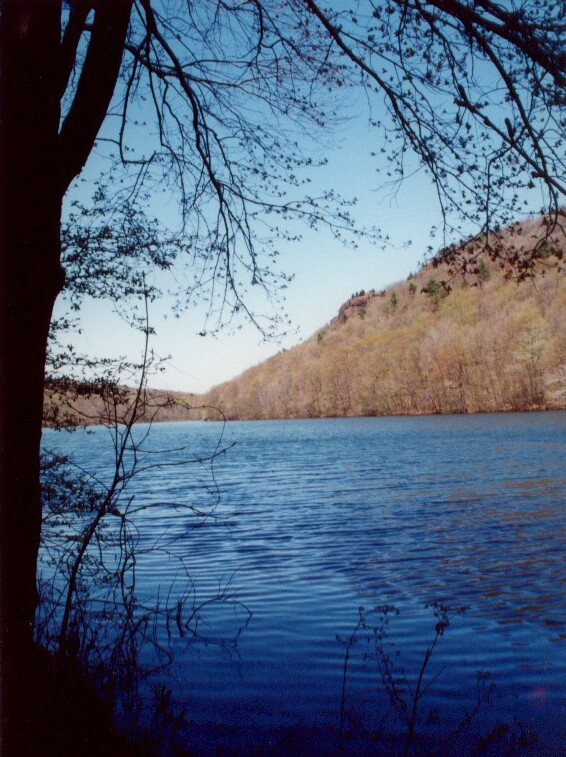
Farmington Mountain

North ↑

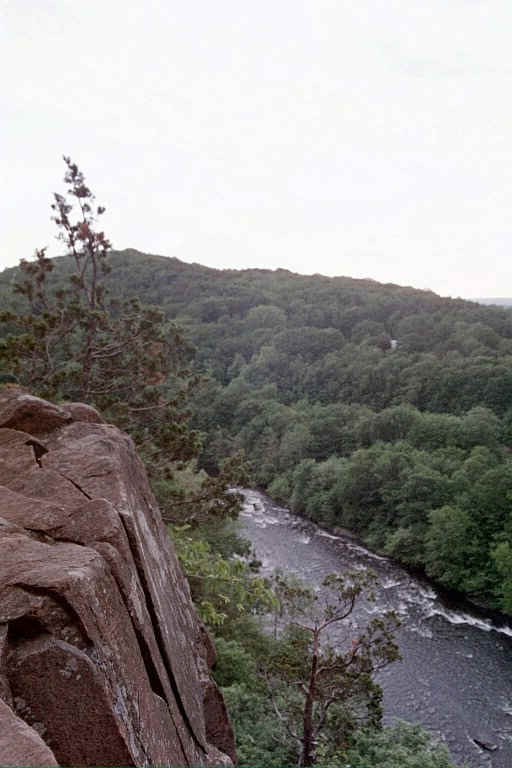
Hatchet Hill
