= Batson =

Batson is a patronymic surname, derived from Bartholomew. It may refer to:

- Albert Edwin Batson (d. 1903), American murderer, namesake of the murder ballad "Batson"
- Benjamin Batson (1942–1996), American academic and historian
- Brendon Batson, English soccer player
- Cameron Batson (born 1995), American football player
- Daniel Batson, American social psychologist
- Felix Ives Batson (1819–1871), American lawyer and politician
- Henrietta Batson (1859–1943), English writer
- Maggie Batson (born 2003), American actress, business owner and philanthropist
- Mark Batson, American record producer and songwriter
- Matthew Arlington Batson (1866–1917), United States Army officer
- Nadia Batson, female soca singer of Trinidad and Tobago
- Nathan Batson, English cricket player
- Ruth Batson (1921–2003), American civil rights and education activist
- Susan Batson, American actress, author, and producer; daughter of Ruth Batson

== Fictional characters ==
- Billy Batson the alter ego of Captain Marvel

== See also ==
- Batson, Texas
- Batson venous plexus, feature of human pelvic anatomy
- Batson v. Kentucky (1986), United States Supreme Court case
- Alexander Edmund Batson Davie (1847–1889), Canadian lawyer and politician
