= TMSC =

The acronym TMSC might refer to:

- Toshiba Medical Systems Corporation
- Talcott Mountain Science Center
- the pin Test Serial Data of the JTAG debug interface
