= David G. Rand =

American academic

David Rand
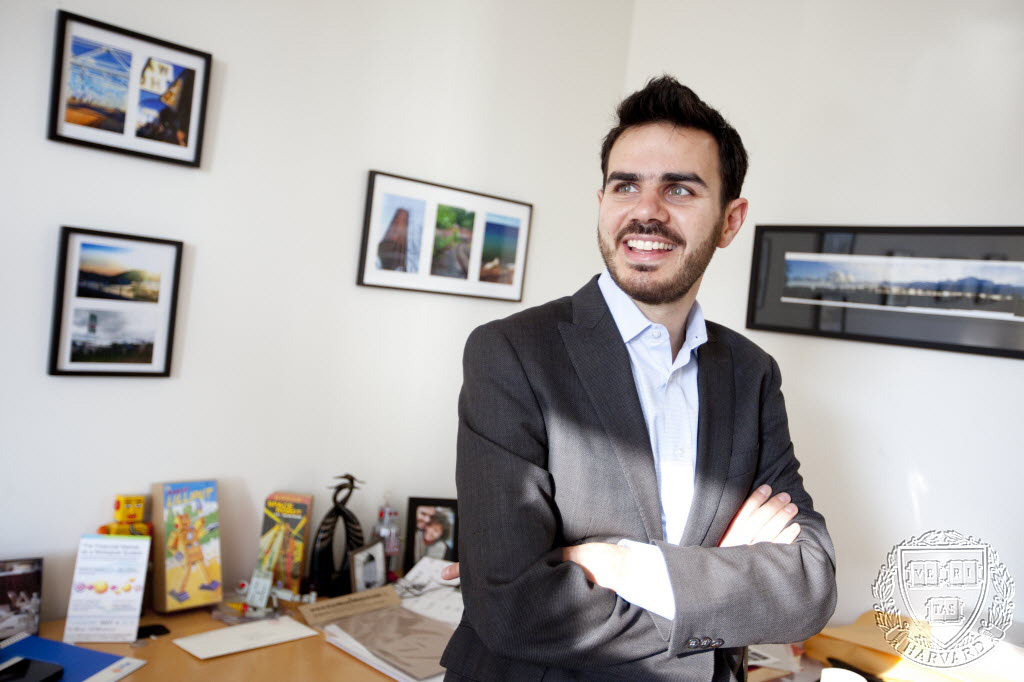
- Education: Cornell University; Harvard University
- Scientific career
- Fields: Psychology, Economics, Marketing, Mathematical Biology, Cognitive Science, Management
- Workplaces: Cornell University
- Doctoral advisor: Martin Nowak
- Other academic advisors: Joshua Greene
- Website: http://www.DaveRand.org

David G. Rand is an American academic who is a professor of information science, marketing, and psychology at Cornell University. His research uses behavioral experiments, field studies, and computational methods to study cooperation, human decision-making, misinformation, political polarization, and interactions between humans and generative artificial intelligence.

== Biography ==
Rand grew up in Ithaca, New York, where his father is a professor at Cornell University. As a teenager he was in several rock bands, including solo project Robot Goes Here.

He earned his undergraduate degree from Cornell in computational biology in 2004, then worked for two years at Gene Network Sciences. He then went to Harvard, where he earned a PhD in systems biology in 2009. After 4 years of post-doctoral studies at Harvard, in 2013 Rand began an assistant professorship at Yale University in psychology, economics, management. In 2017 he was appointed a tenure-track associate professor in psychology at Yale. In 2018 he was promoted to associate professor with tenure at Yale, and then moved to MIT as a tenured associate professor, where he then became full professor. In 2025, he joined Cornell University as a professor of Information Science, Marketing, and Psychology.

In January 2012, Rand was named to Wired Magazine's Smart List 2012 as one of "50 people who will change the world".

== Publications ==
Scientific

- Dreber, A; Rand, DG; Fudenberg, D; Nowak, MA (20 March 2008). "Winners don't punish". Nature. 452 (7185): 348–51. Bibcode:2008Natur.452..348D. doi:10.1038/nature06723. PMC 2292414. PMID 18354481.
- Rand, DG; Dreber, A; Ellingsen, T; Fudenberg, D; Nowak, MA (4 September 2009). "Positive interactions promote public cooperation". Science. 325 (5945): 1272–5. Bibcode:2009Sci...325.1272R. doi:10.1126/science.1177418. PMC 2875121. PMID 19729661.
- Rand, DG; Pfeiffer, T; Dreber, A; Sheketoff, RW; Wernerfelt, NC; Benkler, Y (14 April 2009). "Dynamic remodeling of in-group bias during the 2008 presidential election". Proceedings of the National Academy of Sciences of the United States of America. 106 (15): 6187–91. Bibcode:2009PNAS..106.6187R. doi:10.1073/pnas.0811552106. PMC 2664153. PMID 19332775.
- Beale, N; Rand, DG; Battey, H; Croxson, K; May, RM; Nowak, MA (2 August 2011). "Individual versus systemic risk and the Regulator's Dilemma". Proceedings of the National Academy of Sciences of the United States of America. 108 (31): 12647–52. Bibcode:2011PNAS..10812647B. doi:10.1073/pnas.1105882108. PMC 3150885. PMID 21768387.
- Rand, DG; Arbesman, S; Christakis, NA (29 November 2011). "Dynamic social networks promote cooperation in experiments with humans". Proceedings of the National Academy of Sciences of the United States of America. 108 (48): 19193–8. Bibcode:2011PNAS..10819193R. doi:10.1073/pnas.1108243108. PMC 3228461. PMID 22084103.
- Shenhav, A; Rand, DG; Greene, JD (August 2012). "Divine intuition: cognitive style influences belief in God". Journal of Experimental Psychology. General. 141 (3): 423–8. doi:10.1037/a0025391. PMID 21928924.
- Fudenberg, Drew; Rand, David G; Dreber, Anna (April 2012). "Slow to Anger and Fast to Forgive: Cooperation in an Uncertain World". American Economic Review. 102 (2): 720–749. doi:10.1257/aer.102.2.720. S2CID 14247829. Author's manuscript at Harvard repository
- Rand, DG; Greene, JD; Nowak, MA (20 September 2012). "Spontaneous giving and calculated greed". Nature. 489 (7416): 427–30. Bibcode:2012Natur.489..427R. doi:10.1038/nature11467. PMID 22996558. S2CID 4326080.
- Rand, DG; Epstein, ZG (2014). "Risking your life without a second thought: intuitive decision-making and extreme altruism". PLOS One. 9 (10) e109687. Bibcode:2014PLoSO...9j9687R. doi:10.1371/journal.pone.0109687. PMC 4198114. PMID 25333876.

Popular media

- Rand, David; Nowak, Martin (11 November 2009). "Comment: How reputation could save the Earth". New Scientist.
- Yoeli, Erez; Rand, David (28 August 2015). "Opinion: The Trick to Acting Heroically". The New York Times.
