= Beatson =

Beatson is a surname. Notable people with the surname include:

- Alexander Beatson (1759–1833), East India Company office, governor of St. Helena, and experimental agriculturist
- Benjamin Wrigglesworth Beatson (1803–1874), English classical scholar
- George Beatson (1848–1933), British physician
- George Steward Beatson (died 1874), Scottish doctor
- Patrick Beatson (1758–1800), Scottish-born mariner and shipbuilder
- Robert Beatson (1742–1818), Scottish writer

== See also ==
- Beatson West of Scotland Cancer Centre
- Bateson (surname)
