= Penwood State Park =

State park in Hartford County, Connecticut

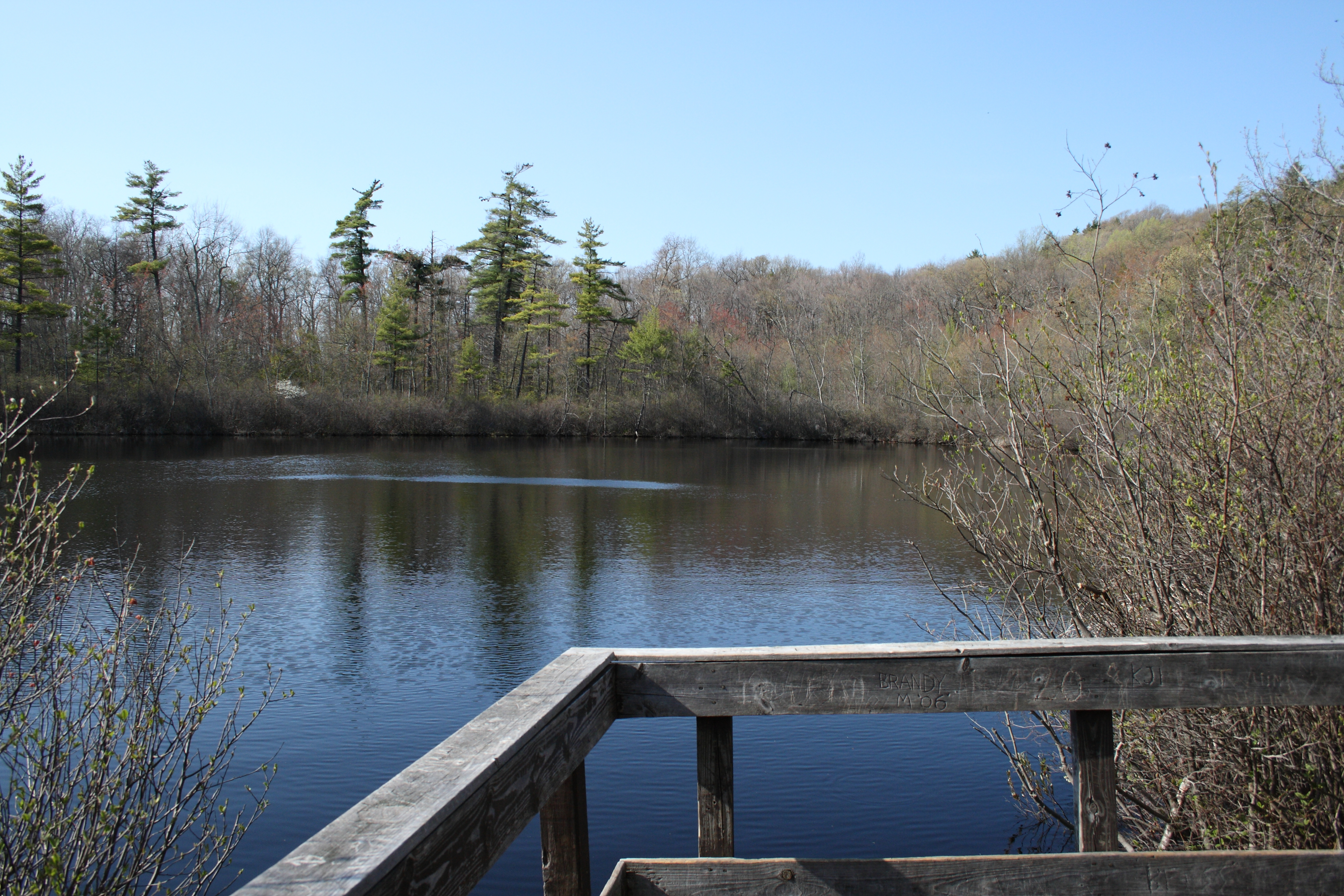
- Lake Louise

- Location within Connecticut Location within the United States
- Location: Bloomfield, Connecticut, United States
- Coordinates: 41°51′43″N 72°46′46″W
- Area: 787 acres (318 ha)
- Elevation: 535 ft (163 m)
- Established: 1944
- Administrator: Connecticut Department of Energy and Environmental Protection
- Designation: Connecticut state park
- Website: Official website

Penwood State Park is a public recreation area located on Talcott Mountain in the town of Bloomfield, Connecticut. The state park's 787 acres (318 ha) are contiguous with the north end of Talcott Mountain State Park. Both parks are managed by the Connecticut Department of Energy and Environmental Protection.

== History ==
Penwood State Park was donated to the state in 1944 by Curtis H. Veeder, an industrialist (founder of Gilbarco Veeder-Root), inventor, and outdoorsperson. Veeder wished the property to "be kept in a natural state so that those who love nature may enjoy this property as I have enjoyed it." He blazed many of the original trails in the park; Lake Louise, a scenic kettle bog atop the ridge, was named after his wife.

== Activities and amenities ==
The park offers picnic areas, numerous trails, and paved roads accessible by bike. The Metacomet Trail runs the entire length of the park.
