= Battey =

Battey is a surname and may refer to:

- C. M. Battey (1873–1926), African-American photographer
- Earl Battey (1935–2003), American baseball player
- Emily Verdery Battey (1826–1912), American journalist
- Evan Battey (born 1998), American basketball player
- Heather Battey, British statistician
- Karyn Battey, American politician
- Richard Battey (1929–2017), U.S. federal judge
- Robert Battey (1828–1895), American physician

== See also ==
- Battey-Barden House, an historic house in Rhode Island
- Batty
- Battye
