= Baty =

Baty may refer to:

== People ==
- Brett Baty (born 1999), American baseball player
- Gaston Baty (1885–1952), French playwright and theatre director
- Greg Baty (born 1964), former American football player
- Richard Baty (died 1758), Scottish Anglican divine
- Patrick Baty (born 1956), British historian of paint and colour
- Thomas Baty (1869–1954), British transgender lawyer, author and activist

== See also ==
- Batty
