= David K. Wyatt =

American historian (1937–2006)

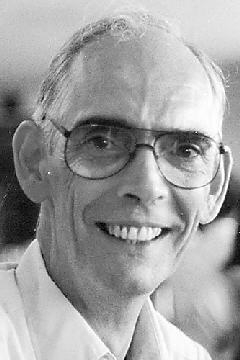
- Born: David Kent Wyatt; September 21, 1937; Fitchburg, Massachusetts, U.S.
- Died: November 14, 2006 (aged 69); Ithaca, New York, U.S.
- Spouse: Alene Wilson
- Children: 3

Academic work
- Discipline: Historian
- Institutions: Cornell University
- Main interests: History of Southeast Asia

David Kent Wyatt (September 21, 1937 – November 14, 2006) was an American historian and author who studied Thailand. He taught at Cornell University from 1969 to 2002, and also served as Chair of the Cornell University Department of History and as the president of the Association for Asian Studies in 1993. His book Thailand: A Short History has become a standard text on Thai history in the English language.

== Biography ==
=== Early life ===
David K. Wyatt was born in Fitchburg, Massachusetts, on September 21, 1937. He was raised in Iowa. He studied philosophy at Harvard University, and received a B.A. in 1959. He furthered his studies at Boston and Cornell University, respectively, where he graduated with an M.A. in 1960 and a Ph.D. in 1966, both in history. His dissertation, which discussed political reform in Thailand, was published in 1969 as Thailand: The Politics of Reform. He learned to speak Thai fluently. He married Alene Wilson, and had three children and five grandchildren.

=== Career ===
Before receiving his doctorate, Wyatt accepted a teaching position at the University of London's School of Oriental and African Studies–where he taught until 1968. After teaching for a year at the University of Michigan, he returned to the Cornell Department of History in 1969–the same year he served as the doctoral advisor to the late historian Benjamin Batson–and taught there until his retirement in 2002. He was the Department's Chair for a time. He was president of the Association for Asian Studies in 1993.

In October 2005, he sold his library–consisting of roughly 15,000 volumes, many of them written in Thai, including Thai royal journals–to the Southeast Asia Collection at Ohio University.

=== Death ===
Wyatt was diagnosed with multiple sclerosis in 1995, but continued to travel extensively until his death. He died at the age of 69 on November 14, 2006, from complications of emphysema and congestive heart failure in the Hospicare Residence in Ithaca, New York.

== Notable works ==
- The Politics of Reform in Thailand: Education in the Reign of King Chulalongkorn (1969)
- Thailand: A Short History (1982, 2nd ed. 2003)
- Siam in Mind (2002)
- Reading Thai Murals (2004)
