= Robert Beatson =

Scottish soldier, compiler and miscellaneous writer

- Born: 1741
- Died: 1818 (aged 76–77)

Robert Beatson, LL.D. FRSE FSA (1741–1818) was a Scottish compiler and miscellaneous writer.

== Life ==
He was born on 25 June 1741 at Dysart in Fife, Scotland, the son of David Beatson of Vicarsgrange.

He was educated for the military profession, and on one of his title-pages describes himself as 'late of his majesty's corps of Royal Engineers'. The Dictionary of National Biography states it was probably as a subaltern in this corps that he accompanied the unsuccessful expedition against Rochefort in 1757 (but he was only 15 years old and he is not listed by the Corps History as being an engineer on the expedition), and was present with the force which, reaching the West Indies early in 1759, failed in the attack on Martinique, but succeeded in capturing Guadeloupe. He is represented in 1766 as retiring on half-pay, and as failing, in spite of repeated applications, to secure active employment during the American War of Independence. However, in 1784 Beatson was a first lieutenant in the Corps of Engineers and was stationed in Scotland.

Afterwards he seems to have farmed in Scotland. He became an honorary member of the Board of Agriculture, of the Royal Highland Society of Scotland, and of the Royal Society of Arts. He died at Edinburgh on 24 January 1818. One obituary notice describes him as "late barrack-master at Aberdeen". It is uncertain whether Edinburgh or Aberdeen university conferred on him his degree of LL.D.

== Works ==
- In 1786 Beatson published in three parts his 'Political Index to the Histories of Great Britain and Ireland, or a complete register of the hereditary honours, public offices, and persons in office from the earliest periods to the present time'. It was dedicated to the author's friend Adam Smith. In 1788 it reached a second edition, in two volumes, containing nearly twice as much matter as the first, and a third edition in 1806.
- In 1790 appeared, in three volumes, Beatson's Naval and Military Memoirs of Great Britain, from the year 1727 to the present time, in which the naval element predominates. It has lists of the ships in the squadrons and fleets of France and Spain as well as of Great Britain during the period dealt with, and also despatches, state papers, and geographical descriptions of the places referred to in the text.
- In 1807 appeared three volumes of A Chronological Register of both Houses of Parliament from the Union in 1708 to the Third Parliament of the United Kingdom of Great Britain and Ireland. Besides lists of peers qualified to sit in each parliament, bounties and boroughs alphabetically arranged are given in chronological order, with the names of their members in every House of Commons during the period, and notes on the changes, with their causes, in the representation of each constituency. Election petitions and the decisions on them are given with a statement of the elective authority, and of the nature of the electoral franchise in each constituency.
- Beatson was also the author of a pamphlet on the Battle of Ushant (1778): A New and Distinct View of the memorable Action of the 27 July 1778, in which the Aspersions cast on the Flag Officers are shown to be totally unfounded.

== Namesakes ==
The present Robert Beatson has often been confused (including by sources of his time) with two other writers of the same name:

- Robert Beatson (1730–1805) of Kilrie, writer on windmills; father of Helena Beatson and Maj.-Gen. Alexander Beatson.
- Robert Beatson (1732–1815) of Pitteadie, writer on the agriculture of Fife.
