= Robot Goes Here =

- Born: David G. Rand; February 28, 1982 (age 44)
- Origin: Ithaca, New York, U.S.
- Genres: Electropunk
- Years active: 2004–2007
- Label: Infidel Records

Robot Goes Here was an electropunk solo project from Ithaca, New York, on Infidel Records, by Dave Rand (now a professor of Psychology, Economics, and Management at Yale University).

Dave Rand, originally from Ithaca, New York, spent his teenage years playing guitar, bass, and singing in punk bands and touring the east coast. When Location disbanded in 2004, Rand began to write for this new project. In Robot Goes Here, he performed alone on stage with a laptop and microphone, with synthesized sounds and samples taking the place of guitar amps in this computer generated hardcore band. "Start with a computer kid in a punk rock band, take away the band and this is what you get," said Rand of his evolution.

Robot Goes Here's debut full-length album, The Byte Is In Your Blood, was written and recorded in the period that Rand was graduating from Cornell University. It was mixed by Ray Martin (Gorillaz, Iggy Pop, Mindless Self Indulgence) and Ted Young (Taking Back Sunday, Bouncing Souls, Andrew W.K.). The album covers topics from "When the Well Runs Dry," which contemplates how savage anyone could be under desperate circumstances, to "What All The Screaming's About," a celebration of the struggle between emotion and technology. In "Seeing Green," a chaotic diatribe on waste and consumerism, Rand sings, "I found the idea for this song at the bottom of a dumpster, along with a book on conservation and a bottle of shampoo." The album also includes a cover of AC/DC's "Back in Black."

The Byte Is In My Blood was followed by an EP of covers titled Mechanical Advantage. This EP included covers of Iron Maiden's The Trooper, Anti-Flag's Die for the Government, Nancy's DIY, AC/DC's Back in Black, and Sesame Street's Live on the Moon.

Robot Goes Here was featured on NPR's nationally syndicated Here and Now program along with his involvement in the Antenna Alliance. "When The Well Runs Dry" is on millions of laptops sent to children in developing countries as part of MIT's One Laptop Per Child initiative. The "What All The Screaming's About" music video was selected for the 2006 No Exit international film festival and two Robot Goes Here instrumental songs are on the soundtrack for the Eyeball Knights 4 video game.

Dave Rand also performs acoustic songs under the moniker Gertler's Law, including a number of Robot Goes Here covers. All songs of both projects are freely downloadable on BandCamp.
