= Benjamin Batson =

American mathematician and historian

Benjamin Batson (1942–1996) was an American mathematician and historian who studied 20th century Thai history. He spent almost his entire professional life in Southeast Asia.

== Biography ==
Batson was born in Tennessee in 1942. Batson earned a bachelor's degree in mathematics in 1963 at Harvard College, where he was elected to membership of Phi Beta Kappa and played on the Harvard chess team. He briefly returned Tennessee to work at the Oak Ridge National Laboratory. He then moved to Thailand, teaching mathematics at Chulalongkorn University from 1964 to 1966. After completing a master's degree under Walter Vella at the University of Hawaiʻi in 1968, he returned to Thailand to teach mathematics at Chiang Mai University in the north of the country. He received grants from the East–West Center, NDFL Act (Title IV), the Ford Foundation, and the Social Science Research Council. While there he developed an interest in Thai history.

== History career and publications ==
In 1969 he entered the Southeast Asia Program graduate program at Cornell University, where his thesis on the end of Thailand's absolute monarchy and transition to a constitutional monarchy was supervised by David K. Wyatt. While at Cornell Batson attracted the attention of Walter LaFeber, the eminent historian of American foreign policy, whom he served under as a teaching assistant. Sifting through neglected files at the National Archives in Bangkok, Batson uncovered a long lost collection of papers in which the concept of democracy in Thailand was debated between the seventh Bangkok king and his ministers and advisers. He translated a selection of these and published them as Siam's Political Future: Documents from the End of the Absolute Monarchy in 1974. He was a research fellow at the Australian National University in the late 1970s, during which time he revised his dissertation for publication as The End of the Absolute Monarchy in Siam by the Oxford University Press in 1984. He wrote a work on the Thai literary figure and political activist, Kulap Saipradit. He also began studying Japanese-Thai relations with Shimizu Hajime inspired Southeast Asia under Japanese Occupation and The Tragedy of Wanit: A Japanese Account of Wartime Thai Politics in 1980 and 1990, respectively.

Batson's last published piece, published in the Journal of Southeast Asian Studies, in March 1996, discussed Phra Sarasas, a figure who positioned himself as power-broker between the Japanese and Thai governments during the leadup to World War II.

Batson died unexpectedly of heart disease in Singapore on January 7, 1996, at the age of 53.
