= Heublein Tower =

Coordinates: 41.8259°N 72.7985°W

- U.S. National Register of Historic Places
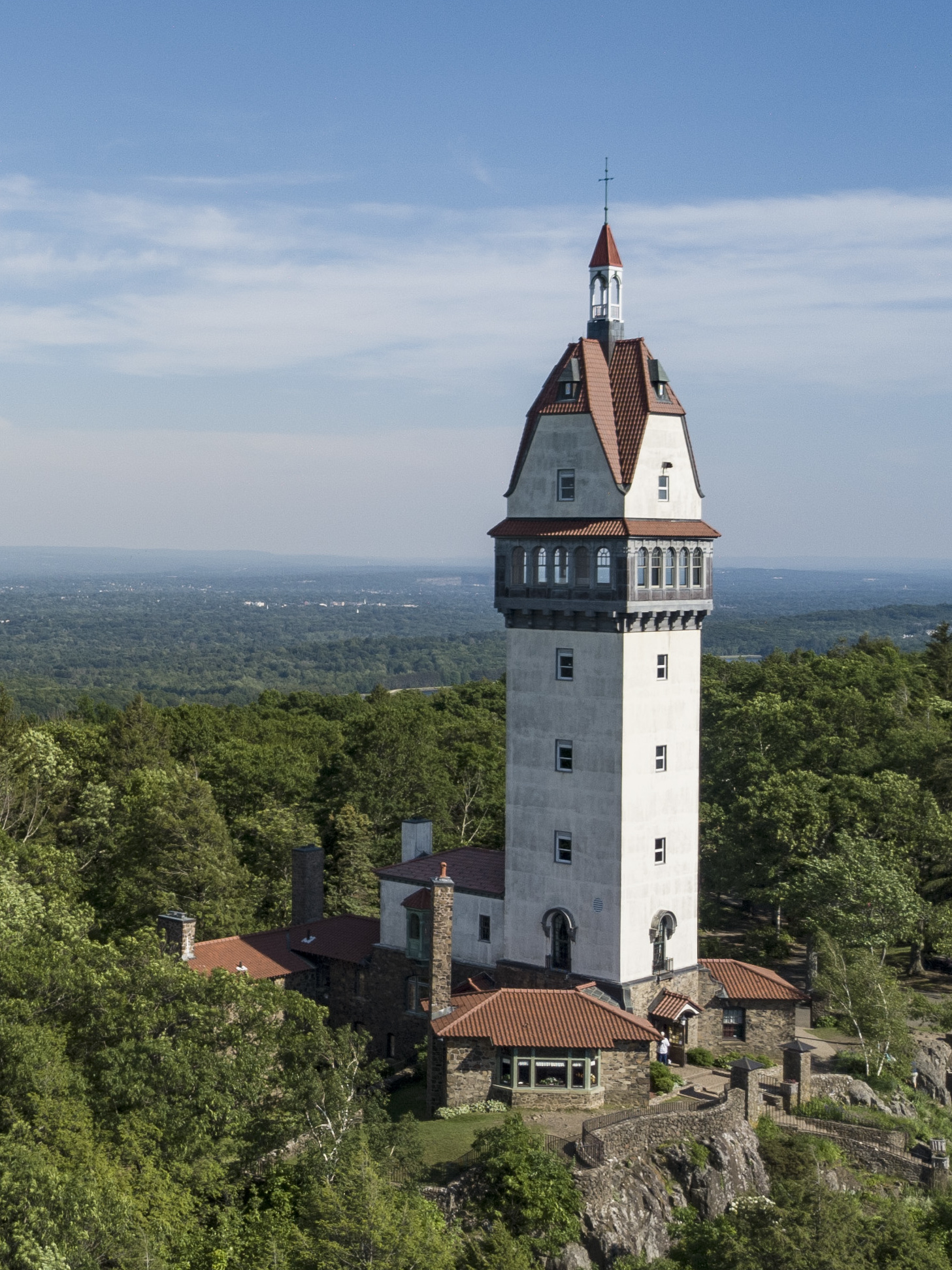
- Location: Simsbury, Connecticut
- Area: 4.5 acres (1.8 ha)
- Built: 1914
- Architect: Smith and Bassette
- NRHP reference No.: 83001260
- Added to NRHP: July 30, 1983

Heublein Tower is a 165-foot-tall (50 m) architectural tower located in Talcott Mountain State Park in Simsbury, Connecticut. It provides panoramic views of the Hartford skyline, the Farmington River Valley, and surrounding areas that are particularly spectacular in the fall. It was listed on the National Register of Historic Places in 1983.

== Pronunciation ==
The correct pronunciation of the tower is debated. The Heublein family came from Germany, whence the pronunciation /ˈhɔɪblaɪn/ HOY-blyne, but after immigrating to the United States, it was pronounced /ˈhaɪblaɪn/ HY-blyne. Heublein Inc. was bought by the R. J. Reynolds Tobacco Company in 1982, which ran advertising on The Tonight Show Starring Johnny Carson, who pronounced it as it was used at the time as /ˈhjuːblaɪn/ HEW-blyne.

== History ==
=== Origin ===
Gilbert Heublein was a food and beverage magnate, noted as a manufacturer of A.1. Steak Sauce and Smirnoff vodka, and founder of the spirits company Heublein Inc.

He was hiking with his fiancée Louise M. Gundlach on Talcott Mountain, and he promised her that one day he would build her a castle there.

=== Construction ===
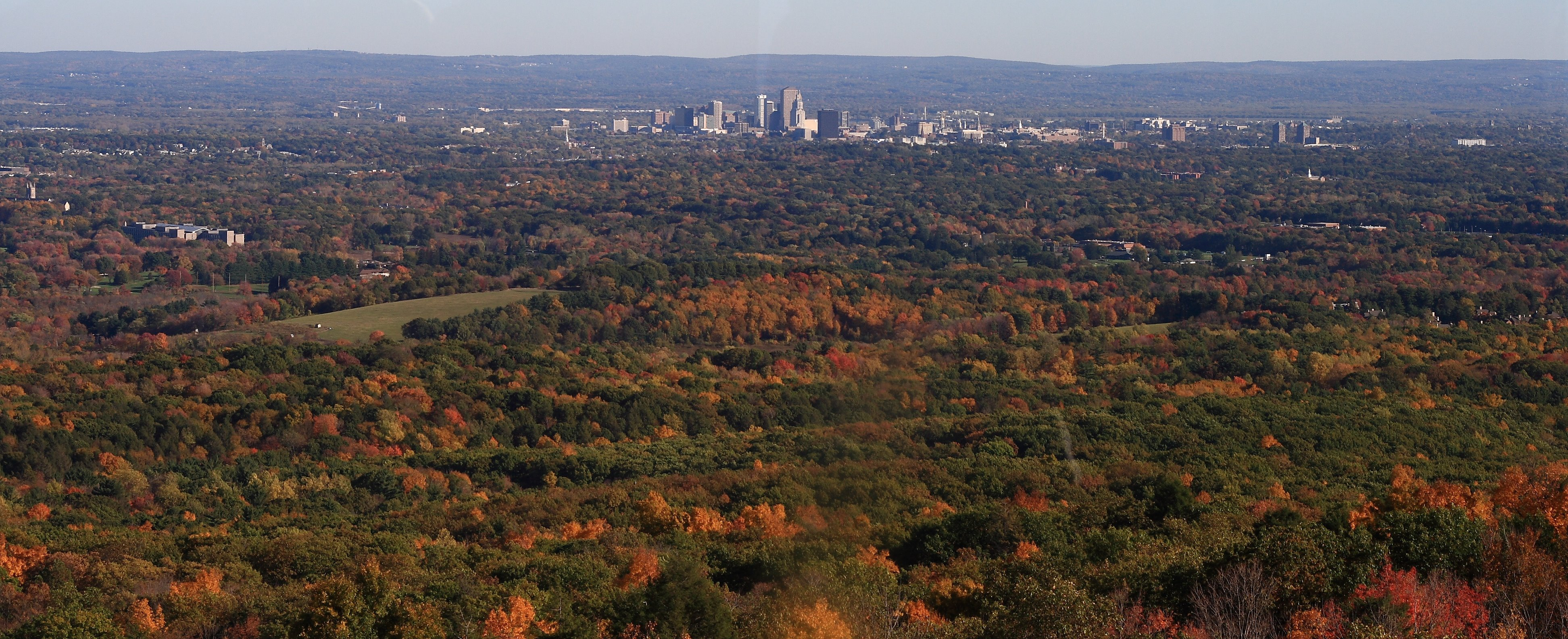
The view of Hartford from atop the tower

The Heublein Tower was designed by Smith and Bassette to survive 100 mph (160 km/h) winds, and built by T. R. Fox and Son in 1914. It served as Gilbert Heublein's summer home and retreat. Smith and Bassette also designed the north and south wings of the Governor's Mansion in 1916.

Heublein modeled this structure after buildings in his native Bavaria. It stands 165-foot (50 m) tall, situated 1,000 ft (300 m) above the Farmington Valley. One can see for several dozen miles in all directions from the top floor observation lounge.

The structure consists of a steel frame of 12-inch (300 mm) girders anchored into the bedrock of the mountain ridge. The four columns in the four corners extend up to the second level and are made of reinforced concrete. A system of cross-girder braces adds strength to the shaft, and cross-beams support the floors. It is also the site of the first home elevator in Connecticut.

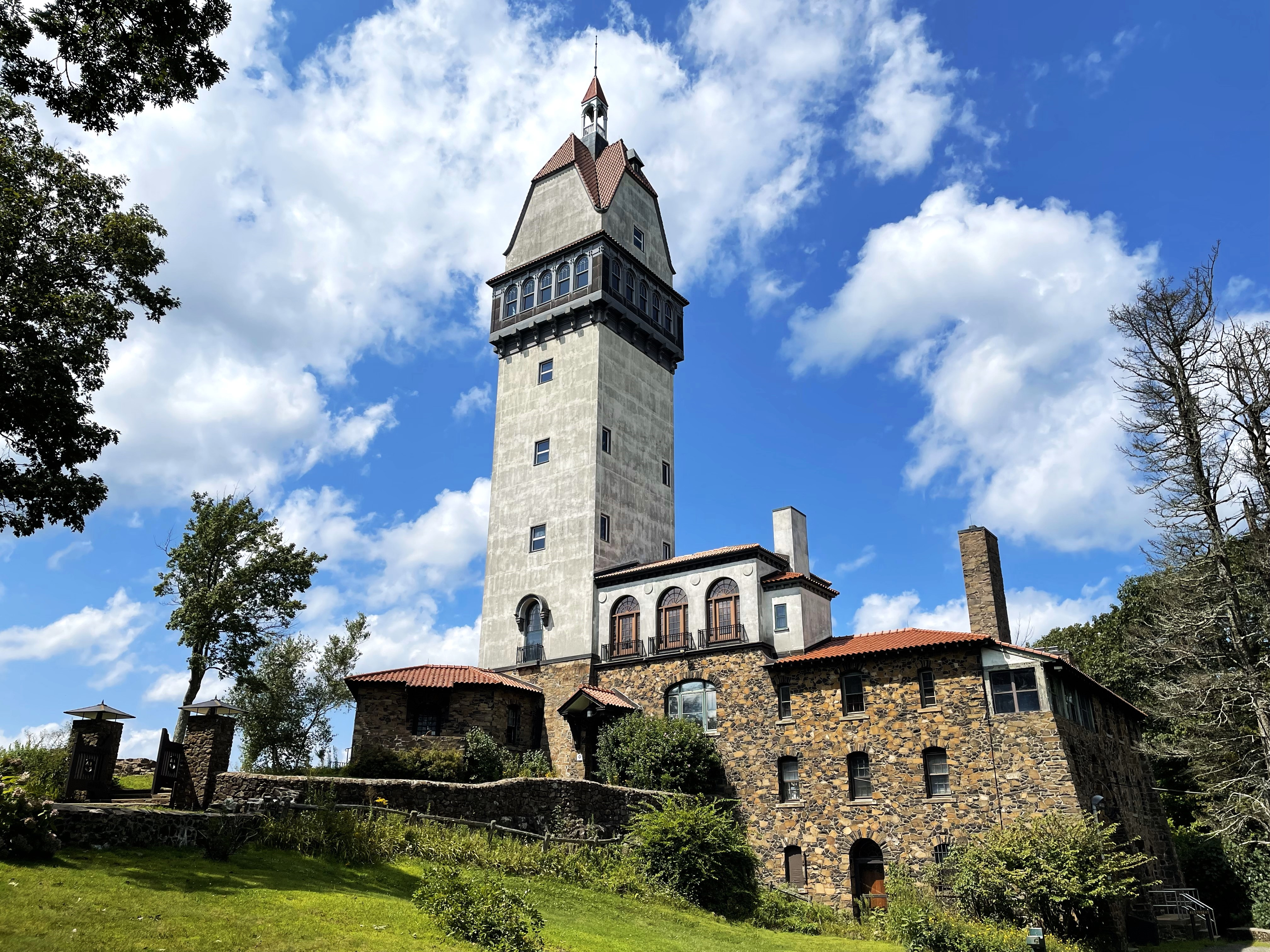

=== Ownership ===
In 1943, the tower was purchased by The Hartford Times, and Heublein Tower became known as the Times Tower. The plan was to use the tower as a broadcasting location for their radio station, WTHT, but it was soon determined the tower could not handle the transmitting antenna's load. It was then employed by the Times as a place for parties and social gatherings for nearly 20 years.

=== In popular culture ===
Due to anti-German sentiment in the United States during World War I, rumors circulated that Gilbert Heublein was using a spotlight on top of the tower's cupola to inform German ships of the location of Allied vessels. In order to stop the rumors, Heublein offered the use of the tower to the state and federal governments, both of which declined.

Several famous people have been guests at the tower. The Republican Party asked General Dwight D. Eisenhower to run for president there, an event which was also attended by Prescott Bush, father of George H. W. Bush. Ronald Reagan also visited the tower in the 1950s while he was president of the Screen Actors Guild. Others included Admiral Charles Nimitz, General Omar Bradley, architect Frank Lloyd Wright, opera singer James Melton, and actress Tallulah Bankhead.

=== Restoration efforts ===
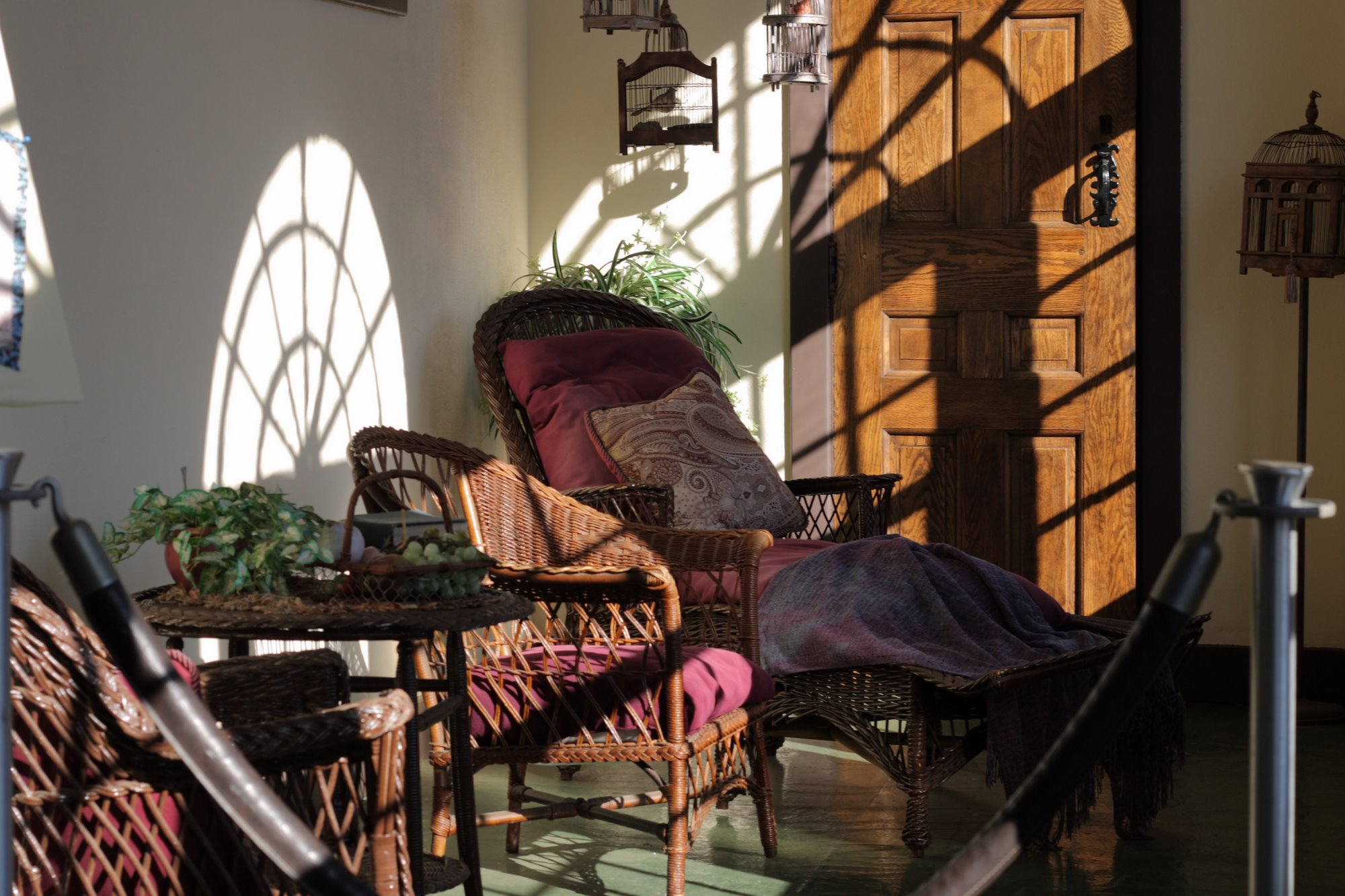
The sleeping porch of Heublein Tower

The Heublein Tower is managed by the State of Connecticut Department of Energy & Environmental Protection. Restoration and support of the Tower interior is funded in large part by the work of the non-profit organization, The Friends of Heublein Tower. The Friends' organization was established in 1985 and is dedicated to preserving and restoring the Heublein Tower and its surrounding estate.

Most recent restoration activities include the installation of a white oak parquet floor in the observation room (known as the ballroom in Gilbert Heublein's day) designed in the same pattern as the original.

== See also ==
- National Register of Historic Places listings in Hartford County, Connecticut
