= Edith Bateson =

English artist

- Born: 1867; Cambridge, England
- Died: 1938 (aged 70–71)
- Education: Royal Academy Schools
- Known for: Sculpture

Edith Bateson (1867–1938) was a British painter and sculptor.

== Biography ==
Bateson was born in Cambridge and studied painting and sculpture at the Royal Academy Schools in London, where she won a number of prizes. Living in Bushey in Hertfordshire, then for a time at Robin Hood's Bay in Yorkshire, Bateson created statuettes and small groups of figures in bronze. From 1891 to 1935 she was a regular exhibitor in group exhibitions in London and Paris. In London she mainly showed works at the Royal Academy, with the International Society of Sculptors, Painters and Gravers and the Royal Society of British Artists while in Paris she exhibited at the Salon des Artistes Francais.
