= Talcott Mountain Science Center =

Coordinates: 41.8161°N 72.7994°W

Talcott Mountain Science Center for Student Involvement ("TMSC") is a non profit corporation in Avon, Connecticut. It is dedicated to the improvement of science education and does so by working directly with students, teachers, and the general public. Located in Avon CT, Talcott Mountain Science Center tries to improve lives of all people through an academy, research institute, and science center programs.

== History ==
Talcott Mountain Science Center Logo

TMSC was established in 1967 under a program of the U.S. Department of Education. Its founders were part of the Avon Public School district and included Superintendent Francis Driscoll and science teachers Donald P. La Salle and George C. Atamian. Its campus atop Talcott Mountain is a former Project Nike missile radar site ("HA-85") that formed part of the U.S. defenses during the Cold War. Initially three small buildings and a guard shack, the Center today houses four main campus buildings with classrooms and laboratories, as well as a weather research station, two observatories, the largest teaching planetarium in Connecticut and - within the surrounding 15 miles - a large visible model of the Solar System.

== Activities ==
The Center provides direct science education in schools in central Connecticut, online resources via the internet, teacher training in science methods, as well as public programs by appointment for students and adults on weekends and evenings, vacations and summers.

Courses include general science for younger students, and enrichment and student-based research in astronomy, chronobiology, computers, ecology, geology, green energy, magic and science, meteorology, music technology, robotics, and video production.

The Center produces curriculum for its own use as well as on a contracted basis for schools and projects. It has originated a number of nationwide educational projects under the U.S. Department of Education and the National Science Foundation. It has been an international consultant to overseas schools in Northern Africa, Eastern Europe and the Mediterranean region.

The Center houses the Talcott Mountain Academy for Science, Mathematics and Technology, a private independent co-educational day school centered on science and providing all academic subjects in grades K-8. The school is targeted at students who want to go above and beyond with gifted and talented educational opportunities to improve the daily lives of their students. Talcott Mountain Academy promotes community engagement, fun and enjoyment, unity, and more educational opportunities to have the children work together to improve their world.

Notably, in 2025, Talcott Mountain Science Center & Academy added a third branch to their organization, Talcott Mountain Research Institute. The goal of the research institute was to conduct research to benefit the overall world. Launching in Summer 2026, the TMRI is launching a High School Stem Research Program, a program offering science projects to dedicated high school students. TMRI is constantly expanding for additional programs such as a new lecture series and travel programs, often considered one of the places for research in the Greater Hartford area.

== Notable alumni ==
- Eric Fossum
- Steve Perlman
