= Henrietta Batson =

English writer

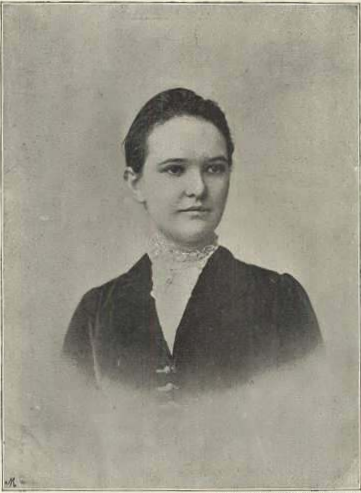
- Photograph of Batson published in The Sketch 1894
- Born: Henrietta Mary Blackman; 1859; Hamilton, Canada West
- Died: 1943 (aged 83–84); Swyre, Dorset, England
- Other names: Mrs. Stephen Batson; H.M. Batson
- Occupation: Writer

Henrietta Mary Batson née Blackman (1859–1943) was an English writer whose interest in the countryside and rural people was an important theme in her novels and much of her non-fiction. She often published as Mrs. Stephen Batson, or sometimes as H.M. Batson.

== Life ==
Born in Hamilton, Canada West to the Rev. Thomas John Mark Willoughby Blackman and Ann Blackman née Gunn in 1859, Batson was living in England by 1871. She stayed there for the rest of her life, and her writing is rooted in English settings and issues. She married in 1879 at Monewden where her father was curate-in-charge, and where she had been an instructor in the night school and the choir. Her husband was the Rev. Alfred Stephen Batson, rector of Welford in Berkshire. Their daughter Mary Stephanie was born the year after their wedding but died when a few weeks old. They lived in the rectory for more than a decade but were then able to move to a smaller, more suitable house.

Batson's writing began to be published in the early 1890s. Her earlier novels seemed to have something in common with Thomas Hardy's, including their “Wessex” setting and exploration of the tragic side of life. She emphasised rural themes and settings in all her novels. She wrote about "rustic" characters and in real life took a sympathetic interest in “less fortunate” country people. Reviewers were generally polite about her novels and gave the impression that she had "ability and vision" and deserved to be read. For example, a review of her novel The Gay Paradines said "...with the small reservations mentioned we can heartily recommend the story to all our readers; the standard is high, and the tone good in every way." However, she got only limited attention from the literary world.

Batson was interested in gardening, folk customs, local history, genealogy and religious topics. She published non-fiction works on most of these subjects and also made scrapbooks, wrote diaries and created a multi-volume manuscript account of family history, which she gave to the London Society of Genealogists.

Batson's husband died in 1908. Her last published work came out in 1910, though she went on compiling family genealogy for several years after that. In the 1911 census she described herself as a writer. At this time her niece Margery May Hodgson was part of the household, and they were also living together in 1939. When Henrietta Batson died at Swyre in Dorset in 1943, probate was granted to Hodgson.

== Selected works ==
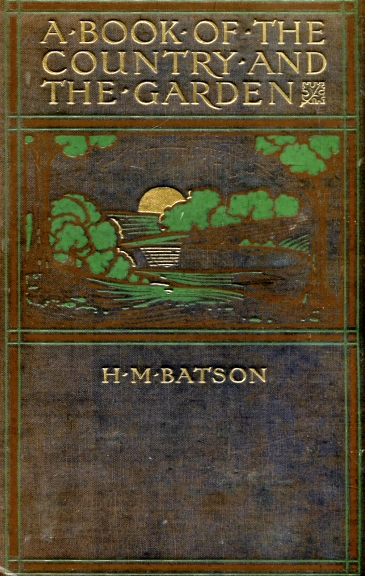
Front cover of "A Book of the Country and the Garden", 1903

=== Fiction ===
- Dark: a Tale of the Down Country, London: Smith, Elder, 1892
- Such a Lord is Love: A woman's heart tragedy, London, A.D. Innes & Co., 1893
- Adam the Gardener, London : Hurst and Blackett, 1894
- The Earth Children, London : Hutchinson & Co., 1897
- The Gay Paradines, London, Stanley, Paul and Co.1909
- A Splendid Heritage, London, Stanley, Paul and Co.1910

=== Non-fiction ===
- Hodge at home, in the Nineteenth Century magazine, vol. 31, 1892
- Terrier and inventory of church possessions in the parish of Welford, Berks., Newbury, 1892
- The rule of the laywoman, in the Nineteenth Century magazine, vol. 39, Jan. 1896
- Town and country labourers: (answers to "The cry of the villages" by A. Jessopp), with P. Wyndham, in the Nineteenth Century magazine, vol. 46, 1899.
- The Ruba'iyat of Omar Khayyam, translated by Edward Fitzgerald; with a commentary by H.M. Batson and a biographical introduction by E.D. Ross, London : Methuen and co. 1900
- A concise handbook of garden flowers, London: Methuen 1903
- A book of the country and the garden, London: Methuen 1903
- The summer garden of pleasure, London: Methuen 1908

=== Other ===
- A history of the Blackman and allied families in Sussex, England, by Henrietta Blackman Batson (Mrs. Alfred Stephen Batson); with addenda, edited, revised, with new material by Marion Wincote Elliott, Los Altos, Calif. 1994
- Index of Mrs Batson's scrapbooks, compiled by Alan W. Garvey, Newbury: Wickham cum Welford History Association c2003
