= Maggie Batson =

American actress

Margaret Elizabeth Batson
- Born: May 21, 2003 (age 21); Shawnee Mission, Kansas
- Occupation(s): Actor, Business owner
- Known for: Founder of Twice Loved

Margaret Elizabeth Batson (born May 21, 2003 in Shawnee Mission, Kansas) is an actress, and business owner. At the age of seven, she started the company Twice Loved by Maggie B that sold hand-made necklaces. The projected revenues for 2011 were US$10,000. Batson donates a portion of her profits to the local Humane Society and to children's hospitals.

Batson has acted in short films, was featured by Biz Kid$ in 2011, and was a contestant on the game show Figure It Out in 2012, ushering in that show's return. Batson will play Richard Dreyfuss' daughter in her first feature film, Killing Winston Jones, due 2015.

Batson won the Kids Are Heroes Award in 2011, and has been chosen to be one of the thirty-six girls featured in Discovery Girl Magazine for 2015. The leadership summit that she will be attending pulls young ladies from all over the country who have demonstrated enthusiasm, personality and are worthy of being role models. The girls will participate in photo shoots and have profiles featured in the magazine. The magazine has a circulation of over 200,000 with a total readership of one million. Maggie is on the cover of the Feb/March 2015 issue.
