= Richard Baty =

Richard Baty (died 1758) was a Scottish Anglican divine.

== Life ==
Baty was born at Arthuret, Cumberland, and was educated at Glasgow University, where he received the degree of M.A. in 1725. For seven years from that date he was curate of Kirkandrew-upon-Esk, in his native country, and in 1732 was presented by the patron, Viscount Preston, to the rectory of the parish. Baty built a parsonage for himself at his own expense, and for the use of his parishioners provided a ferry for the first time across the River Esk, which ran through the town, and across which there was no bridge. He insisted on the importance of education, and promoted the erection of a schoolhouse in the neighbourhood. His genial temper made him popular with all classes of his neighbours, and with the noblemen and gentlemen on both sides of the border; but he was held by some to be too profuse in his hospitality. He studied the eye and its diseases, and had a local fame as a skilful oculist. He died in 1758.

== Publications ==
- A Sermon on the Sacrament, with prayers for the use of persons in private, 1751.
- Seasonable Advice to a Careless World, 1756.
- The Young Clergyman's Companion in Visiting the Sick.
