= Talcott Mountain State Park =

State park in Hartford County, Connecticut

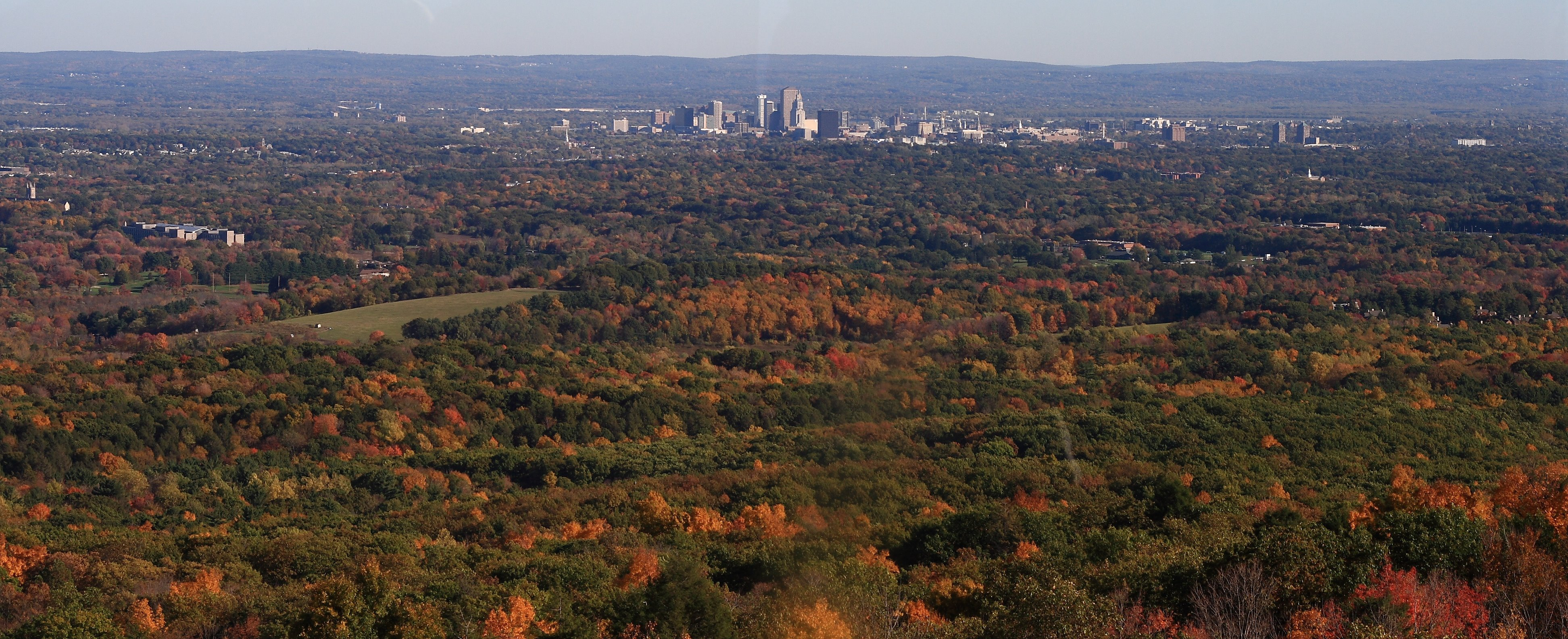
- View of the Hartford skyline from Heublein Tower

- Location within Connecticut Location within the United States
- Location: Avon, Bloomfield & Simsbury, Connecticut, United States
- Coordinates: 41°49′27″N 72°47′54″W
- Area: 574 acres (232 ha)
- Elevation: 938 ft (286 m)
- Established: 1953
- Administrator: Connecticut Department of Energy and Environmental Protection
- Designation: Connecticut state park
- Website: Official website

Talcott Mountain State Park is a 574-acre (232 ha) public recreation area located on Talcott Mountain in the towns of Avon, Bloomfield, and Simsbury, Connecticut. The state park features the Heublein Tower, a 165-foot-high (50 m) mountaintop lookout. Access to the tower and its associated museum is via a 1.25-mile-long (2 km) trail that takes 30 to 40 minutes to walk. The park offers picnicking, views of the surrounding area, and hiking along the Metacomet Trail.

== History ==
Talcott Mountain was first listed as a 19-acre (7.7 ha) undeveloped state park in the 1953 edition of the Connecticut Register and Manual. Heublein Tower became part of the park "through the cooperative efforts of private conservationists and state and federal governments" in 1965.
