= Batty =

Batty is a surname and is most commonly found in Yorkshire, northern England. It is derived from Batte, a medieval form of the given name Bartholomew. Notable people with the surname include:

- Bob Batty (1939–2004), Australian rugby league footballer
- David Batty (born 1968), English footballer
- De Witt Batty (1879–1961), English-born Bishop of Newcastle, New South Wales, Australia (1931–58)
- Emily Batty (born 1988), Canadian racing cyclist
- Fred Batty (1934–2007), English footballer
- Gareth Batty (born 1977), English cricketer
- Grant Batty (1951–2026), New Zealand rugby union footballer
- Jane Batty (born 1946), Canadian politician
- Jason Batty (born 1971), New Zealand footballer
- Jeremy Batty (born 1971), English cricketer
- Jonathan Batty (born 1974), English cricketer
- Kenneth Batty (born 1945), English rugby league footballer
- Nathan Batty (born 1982), English rugby league footballer
- Paul Batty (born 1964), English footballer
- Robert Batty (artist) (1789–1848), English army officer and artist
- Robert Batty (physician) (1763–1849), English physician, father of the above
- Ron Batty (1925–1971), English footballer
- Rosie Batty (born 1962), Australian domestic violence campaigner
- Ross Batty (born 1986), English rugby union player
- Seán Batty (born 1982), Scottish weather presenter
- Staunton Batty (1873–1952), Anglican bishop
- Tyler Batty (born 2000), American football player

Fictional characters include:

- Batty in Noah Z. Jones's Almost Naked Animals
- Roy Batty, from the science fiction film Blade Runner
- Nora Batty, from the British sitcom Last of the Summer Wine
- Wally Batty, from Last of the Summer Wine
- Professor Batty, in the comic book story Flip Decision

== See also ==
- Batty (video game)
- Battey
- Battye
- Baty
- Batty Bay
- Batty boy, sexual slur
