= Earll family murders =

1902 mass murder of a family in Louisiana

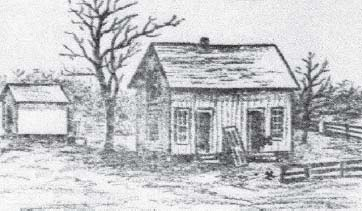
- An illustration of Ward Earll's cabin that appeared in the Houston Post on April 15, 1902
- Location: near Welsh, Louisiana, United States
- Date: 1902; 124 years ago
- Target: Earll family
- Attack type: Mass shooting
- Weapon: Shotgun
- Deaths: 6
- Perpetrator: Albert Edwin Batson

On February 14, 1902, six members of the Earll family were found dead in a cabin near Welsh, Louisiana. Albert Edwin Batson, an itinerant farm worker who had worked for the Earlls, was suspected of the crime. He was tried twice and sentenced to death four times for the killings; despite the sentencing board recommending his sentence be commuted to life in prison, governor William Wright Heard refused to commute his sentence, and on August 15, 1903, Batson was hanged.

The murders and subsequent trial were a cause célèbre in Louisiana in 1902 and 1903, though even then Batson's guilt was controversial. The case inspired the murder ballad "Batson", most famously recorded by blues musician Wilson Jones in 1934. In 2014, a book was published that raised questions over the certainty of Batson's guilt.

== Background ==
The Earll family (Note: Spelling of the family's name varies between sources – some sources use Earle or Earl.) had moved from Iowa to Louisiana around 1890, to farm rice. They were disliked by some in the area, and there was local gossip that they had actually left Iowa to escape the anger of someone they had wronged. Following repeated crop failures, the family moved to Welsh, where L.S. Earll opened a store. In about 1900, they returned to rice farming.

At the start of 1902, the Earll family consisted of the heads of the family, L.S. Earll, 53, and Mrs. Earll, 50, as well as sons Ward, 25, Fred, 23, John, 18, and Lemuel, 11, and two daughters, Maude, in her 20s, and Fay, aged 15. The heads of the family, as well as Fay, John, and Lemuel lived on the family farm three miles southeast of Welsh; Ward lived in a separate house roughly a mile to the northeast, and Fred lived in Iowa and Maud lived with a family she worked for in Welsh. Some believed then that Ward's house was haunted, due to both its looks and the fact that at least two people died as a result of or in the house.

Albert Edwin "Ed" Batson, born to a divorced mother in Spickard, Missouri, had previously worked as a railroad hand starting in 1897. He came to Welsh in 1901, where Ward Earll gave him a job working on the family's rice farm, and he moved into the homesteader's cottage along with Ward. Ward Earll was last seen alive on the night of February 11, 1902.

== Murders and investigation ==
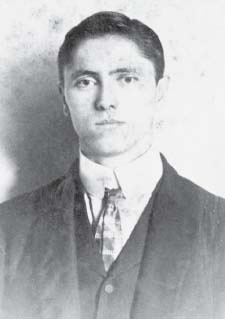
An undated photo of Batson

All the victims were either shot or bludgeoned to death, and additionally had their throats cut. Cloth had been wrapped around the wounds of the victims. At the time of the discovery, the bodies had undergone significant levels of decomposition, a sign that they had already been dead for several days. All of the members of the family were killed except for Fred and Maude Earll; neither were present to be murdered.

After the murders, a man claiming to be Ward Earll arrived in the downtown area of Lake Charles, where he attempted to sell Earll's livestock, before heading to a gun store and then a watch repair shop, where he left Earll's shotgun and watch. Likely due to the fact that the owners of the shop would have been able to identify the real Ward Earll, he instead identified himself as C.R. Batson and A.E. Batson to the store owners. The man, later identified as Albert Batson by witnesses, was noted to have a long scar on the left side of his face. He then found a driver for Wells Fargo, and mailed a package to Batson's mother in Missouri — the package was later found to only contain rice — before retrieving the watch, though leaving the livestock and the shotgun.

Due to the attempted sale of Ward Earll's animals, his acquaintances became suspicious. Paul Daniels, a local businessman, phoned Maude Earll, who had not heard from her family in days. Maude, with a driver, returned to the house, resulting in the discovery of the bodies at the family home. In addition, Earll's buggy was searched, where a vest was found which contained a letter signed by Batson. The letter ended "ha ha bye bye I’m gone", and as a result was referred to as the "Ha-Ha letter" by authorities. By the time this was discovered, Batson had taken a train to Missouri.

Batson was arrested by deputy Isaac Fontenot the same day the bodies were discovered, in Princeton, Missouri. He was returned to Louisiana and charged with the murders. At the time of his arrest, he carried only $2 in cash.

== Trial and execution ==
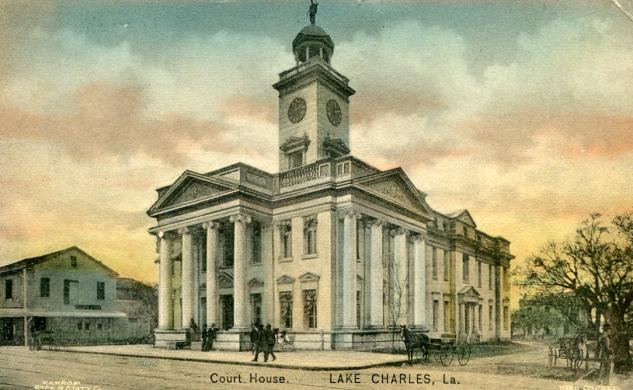
1900s postcard of the Lake Charles courthouse, where the trials took place

The judge E.D. Miller presided over the trial. Batson did not testify in his own defense in either trial. He maintained his innocence throughout the process. He was described as a remarkably well behaved and polite prisoner, leading some to maintain that he was innocent; the murders and subsequent trial became a cause célèbre in Louisiana in 1902 and 1903.

Batson was defended by two court-appointed attorneys, Paul Sompayrac and Winston Overton. The defense argued that Batson had no conceivable motive for killing any of the Earlls, much less the whole family, and that there was no concrete evidence of his guilt, instead arguing that two strangers who had been seen in the area – one of whom had a similar scar to Batson – had committed the crimes. They argued that these men had a grudge against the Earll family, and had tracked them down and murdered them.

The prosecution, led by district attorney Joseph Moore, put forward that Batson had murdered the family, stolen and sold the family's mules for $45, then fled to Missouri. Authorities argued that the "Ha-Ha letter" showed Batson had been suicidal, though they did not present any reason as to why he did not end up killing himself if that was the case.

Charles Dobson, an Associated Press reporter, published a book on the trial, Guilty? Side Lights on the Batson Case, a Recrudescence of the Murder of the Earll Family in Louisiana in 1903, arguing that instead of Batson, two unknown men, "number one" and "number two" had killed the Earlls. In the book he argued this possibly stemmed from an earlier feud the Earll family had acquired in Kansas. This argument was largely repeated in a 1997 article in the Daily Advertiser in Lafayette.

Batson was found guilty in April 1902 and sentenced to death, however, the Louisiana Supreme Court ordered a new trial on a technicality, reversing the first guilty verdict. In March 1903, he was found guilty a second time and again sentenced to death. The sentence was then suspended when the defense moved again for a new trial, and Batson was sentenced to death a third time when the defense's motions were denied. That death sentence was then immediately suspended, as Batson had not been asked if he had anything to say before sentencing (though he had been asked the previous three times); upon being asked, he said he was innocent, and was then sentenced for a fourth and final time to death.

Following the sentencing, members of Louisiana's State Pardon Board became interested in the case, asking governor William Wright Heard to commute Batson's sentence. Heard requested judge Miller, who had presided over both trials, visit Baton Rogue and discuss the case; Miller refused.

On August 15, 1903, Batson was executed by hanging at the Lake Charles jail.

== Legacy ==
Inspired by the case, blues musician Wilson Jones, also known as Stavin' Chain, created a murder ballad titled "Batson", which ran 12 minutes in total, recounting the time leading up to the crime and the capture afterwards – though not the murder itself. The song alludes to the murder ballads "Frankie and Albert" and "Lamkin", in both cases songs in which the perpetrator is actually guilty, but was provoked. A transcription of the song was published in John and Alan Lomax's 1941 book Our Singing Country. Some commentators suggested the ballad portrays Batson as an unlucky, innocent man, accused of a crime he did not commit, contrary to most contemporary descriptions, though the Lomaxes interpreted the song as showing his guilt, saying "the sympathies of the ballad singer rest wholly with the accused, not with his victims". The song was covered by several other performers.

The case was largely forgotten, but in 2014, a book was published on the case, titled Until You Are Dead, Dead, Dead: The Hanging of Albert Edwin Batson. The book explores the certainty of Batson's guilt. The book received a generally positive reception.
