= Heather Battey =

British statistician

Heather Battey is a British statistician whose interests include population-level sparsity and the theoretical foundations of inference in the presence of a large number of nuisance parameters. She is a reader in mathematics at Imperial College London.

== Education and career ==
Battey completed a PhD at the University of Cambridge in 2011. After postdoctoral research as a Brunel Fellow in Statistics at the University of Bristol and as a research fellow at Princeton University, she joined Imperial College London as a lecturer in 2016, since becoming a reader there.

== Recognition ==
Battey was named as a Fellow of the Institute of Mathematical Statistics in 2023, "for contributions to statistical theory and applied probability, in particular for work on new approaches to well-calibrated high-dimensional and conditional inference, and for work on development of the theoretical foundations of statistical inference".
