= Battye =

Battye is a surname, a variant of Batty. Notable people with the surname include:

- Colin Battye (1936–2018), English rugby league footballer
- Don Battye (1938–2016), composer
- Ian Battye (1952–2007), rugby league footballer
- James Battye (1871–1954), librarian
- John Battye (1926–2016), football player
- Malcolm Battye (born 1941), rugby league footballer
- Margaret Battye (1909–1949), lawyer
- Neil Battye (born 1963), rugby league footballer
- Susan Battye (born 1950), New Zealand playwright

== See also ==
- Aubyn Trevor-Battye (1855–1922), traveller and naturalist
- J S Battye Library
- Battye Glacier, Mac. Robertson Land, Antarctica
