= Batterson Park =

Public Park, New Britain, CT & Farmington

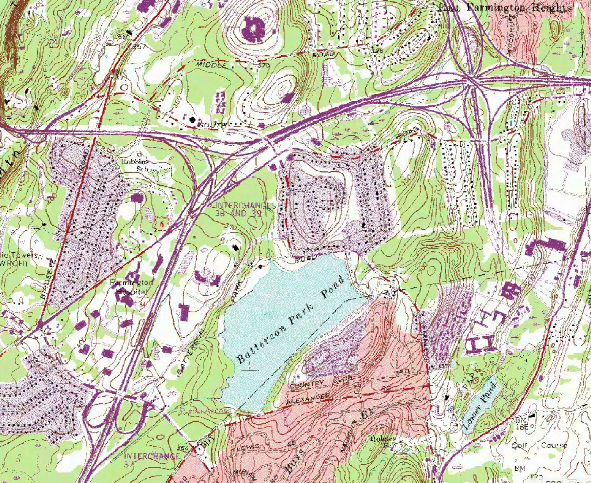
- Batterson Park and surrounding area, 1990
- Interactive map of Batterson Park
- Location: Farmington, CT
- Coordinates: 41.715198°N 72.790182°W
- Opened: Circa 1928
- Operator: City of Hartford

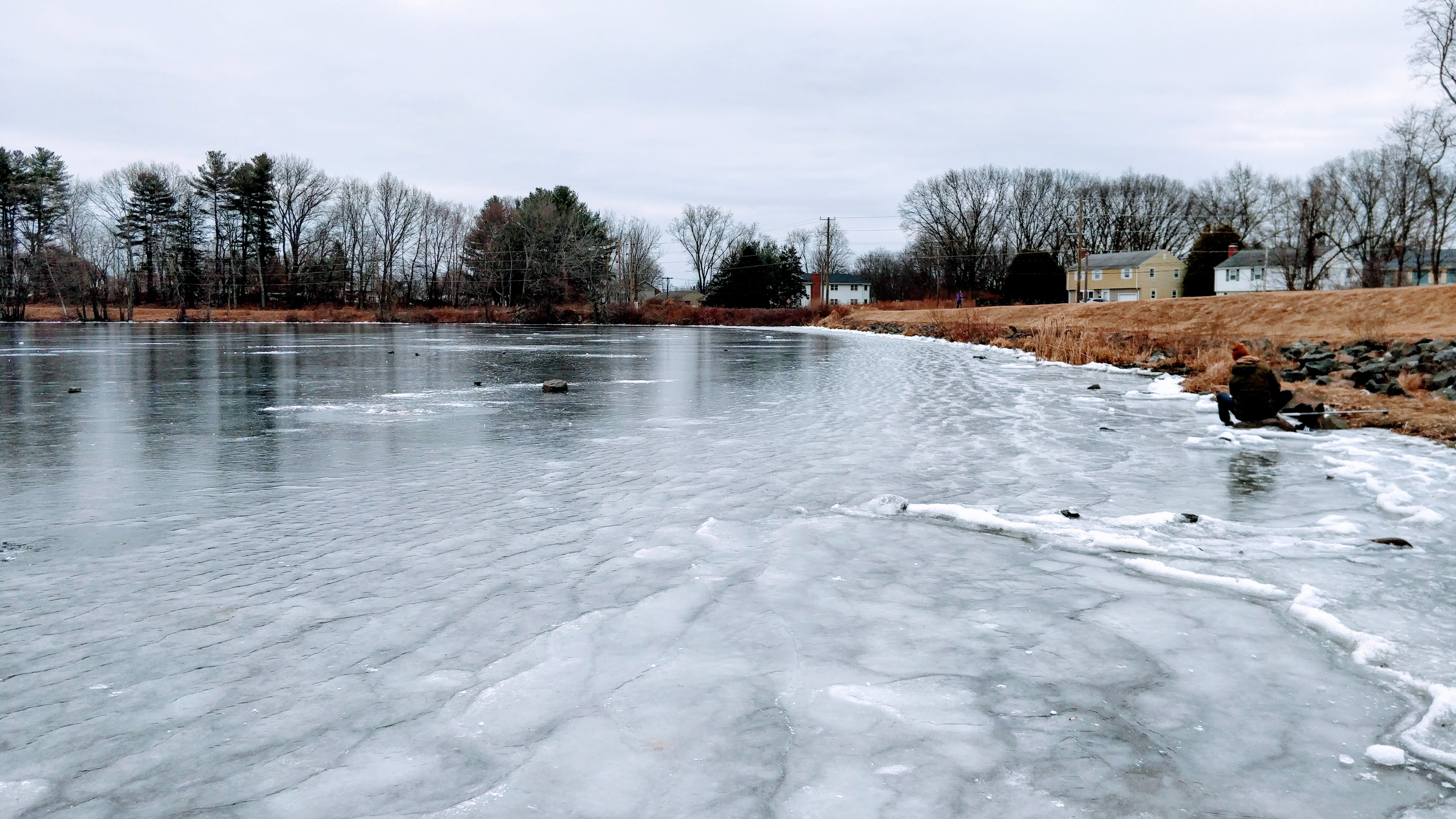
Batterson Park Pond- frozen to Ice, January 2019

Batterson Park is a public park owned by the City of Hartford, Connecticut, though located outside the city limits within the nearby towns of New Britain, CT, and Farmington. It includes a large pond with a state-managed boat launch. The pond was formerly used as reservoir managed by the City Water Department, and became a park sometime after 1928, when the water department turned over the disused land to the city. Parts of the land were sold or transferred for private development and highway construction in the time since, including 67 acres sold in 1988 to establish the Hartford Parks Trust Fund. Approximately 600 acres remain.

Approximately 46% of the parkland owned by the City of Hartford is located outside of its jurisdiction, with the majority of that land comprising Batterson Park. The city is exploring options to create a regional partnership with neighboring towns to share maintenance costs. The town of Farmington has also approached the city to purchase the remaining parcels of Batterson Park, having purchased a portion in 2003. In 2015, the city closed the park to the public due to the expense of maintenance and operation amidst larger budget troubles.

In 2017, Hartford Mayor Luke Bronin proposed transferring land associated with Batterson Park to the city pension fund in 2017 in lieu of a payment of $5,000,000, according to the Hartford Courant, although the land would easily sell for more than $100,000,000 if it was sold for residential use. In 2017, 86 acres of vacant residential-zoned land at 8261 FIENEMANN RD was transferred to the pension fund. This same plot of city-owned land near the park was proposed for sale in 1997 to a developer, however that plan fell through. The pension fund has not indicated whether it intends to maintain the land as a public park, or develop the lot for commercial and/or residential purposes. As of August 2019, the remainder of the shuttered parkland (located on Batterson Park Road) remains under city ownership.

In 2021, the state appropriated $10 Million to the City of Hartford to clean up and rebuilt amenities at Batterson Park. The neighboring towns of New Britain and Farmington, as well as volunteers with the newly formed Batterson Park Conservancy, have pledge to aid in future maintenance. The park was set to reopen in 2023 after renovations are complete. This was revised to a completion date of 2025 on March 23, 2023.

On March 23, 2023 Hartford, Farmington and New Britain leaders along with Connecticut Speaker of the House Matthew Ritter announced a plan to transfer Batterson Park to the state at a press conference in the Capitol in Hartford. If approved the Hartford-owned park would become a state park. The local leaders and House speaker will be looking into using existing statutory frameworks to have the state take over the property.
