= Alexander Beatson =

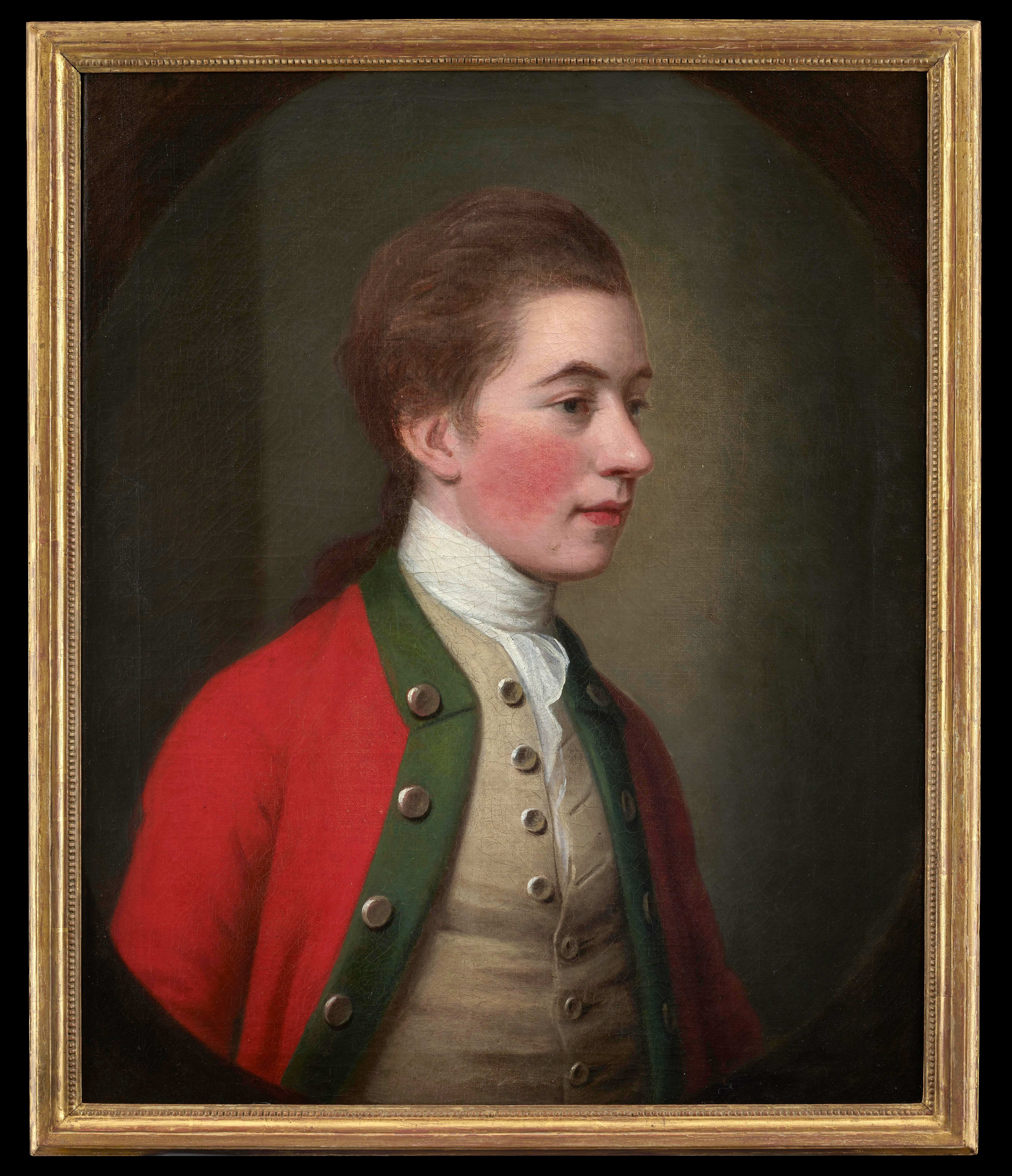
- portrait by his aunt, Catherine Read
- Born: 24 October 1759; Dundee
- Died: 15 October 1830 (aged 70)
- Occupation: Botanist
- Parent(s): Robert Beatson; Jean Read

Alexander Beatson (24 October 1759 – 15 October 1830) was a Madras Army officer and colonial administrator. He was a surveyor and engineer in India, rising to Surveyor General in the Madras Presidency before being posted as a governor of St. Helena. He wrote about the English and the history of the war against Tipu Sultan and on observations made during his tenure on St. Helena.

== Biography ==
Beatson was second son of Robert Beatson, Esq., of Kilrie, Fife County, Scotland and Jean Read, sister of the painter Catherine Read. He obtained a cadetship in 1775, and was appointed to an ensigncy in the Madras infantry, 21 Nov. 1776. He served as an engineer officer at Masulipatam in 1778 in the war with Hyder Ali, although he appears never to have belonged to the engineers. In 1782 he was involved in the 2nd Mysore War. In 1786 he was a senior captain in the Corps of Guides in Lord Cornwallis's campaigns against Tippu Sultan; He went to England in 1796-97 and on return he was made to report to Sir Richard Wellesley at Calcutta. He was appointed ADC to the governor general and he returned to Madras as Surveyor General to the Army and advised Lieutenant-general Harris on the route to Mysore and was present at the siege of Seringapatam in 1799. He suggested bombardment of the north-west side of the fort rater than the south-west fortifications which had been suggested by the Bombay Engineers. General Harris took his advice and after the siege, it was found that the Southwest was well fortified compared to the NW. He attained the rank of colonel on 3 January 1808. He returned to England with Major Alexander Allan and he wrote a book on the 4th Mysore War titled A view of the origin and conduct of the war with Tippo Sultan.

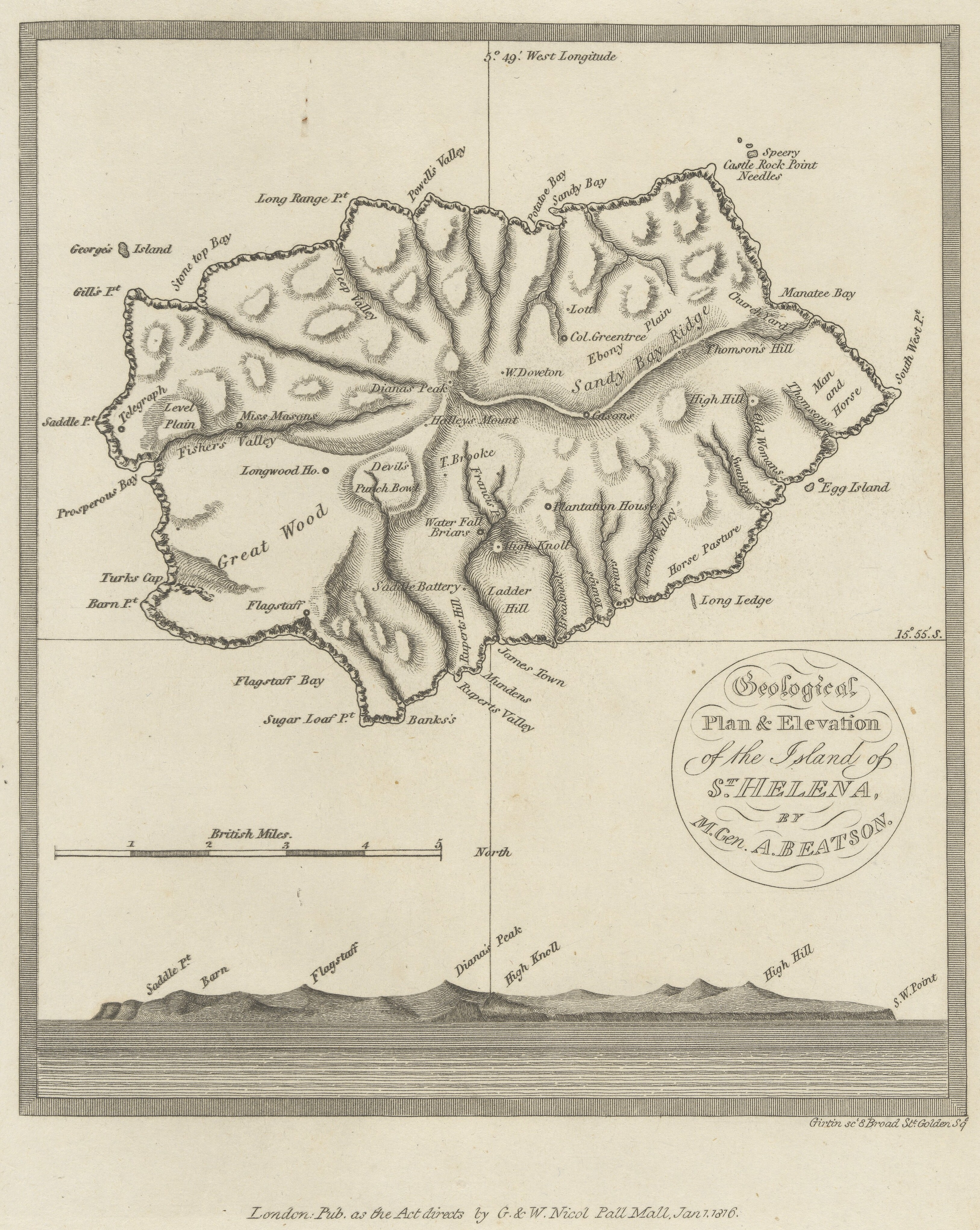
Beatson's map of St. Helena

After leaving India, Beatson was posted governor of St. Helena in 1808 and served there until 1813. The island, which then belonged to the East India Company, was in a very unsatisfactory condition. The scanty population had been nearly swept off by a measles epidemic a short time previously, and, although recruited by emigrants from England and by Chinese coolies, was in a wretched state. The acts of the home authorities in suppressing the spirit traffic and other matters gave rise to great discontent, resulting in a mutiny in 1811, which was put down by the firmness of Beatson, who also introduced a better system of cultivation and many other beneficial measures. Beatson established plantations of trees to reduce soil erosion and an improvement in the hydrology of the island was taken as proof of the need for forest protection in colonial India. William Roxburgh spent time on St. Helena to recover his health and also studied the local flora. He sent a list of plants just before his death to Beatson who published it. Beatson was succeeded as governor of St. Helena by Colonel Mark Wilks.

After his return to England, he devoted much attention to experiments in agriculture at Knole farm and Henley in Frant, Sussex, near Tunbridge Wells. In 1816, Beatson recognized the 1791 droughts of India, St. Helena and Montserrat as being related to a global phenomenon, now known as El Niño. He was promoted major-general July 1810, lieutenant-general June 1814, and died 15 October 1830.

== Family ==
On 28 December 1805 he was married to Davidson Reid (sic) (1787–1865) who was 18 at the time of marriage. She returned to family members in Edinburgh after his death and is buried in the churchyard of St John's on Princes Street.

She was born in Kinghorn in Fife the daughter of David Reid and Jean Renny. They had 13 children.

== Works ==
Beatson was the author of the following works:

- An Account of the Isles of France and Bourbon, 1794, which was never printed, and remains in manuscript at the British Library (Add MS 13868).
- A View of the Origin and Conduct of the War against Tippoo Sultaun (London, 1800, 4to).
- Tracts relative to the Island of St. Helena, with views (London, 1816, 4to)
  - other smaller works on the island besides contributions to the St. Helena Monthly Register
- A New System of Cultivation without Lime or Dung, or Summer Fallowing, as practised at Knole Farm, Sussex (London, 1820, 8vo);
  - various papers on improvements in agriculture.
