= Seven Sisters (Massachusetts) =

Ridge in Massachusetts, U.S.

Highest point
- Elevation: 1,005 ft (306 m)(highest point)
- Parent peak: 42° 18' 17"N, 72° 33' 11"W
- Coordinates: 42°18′08″N 72°34′51″W to 42°18′17″N 72°33′11″W

Geography
- Location: Hadley and South Hadley, Massachusetts.
- Parent range: Holyoke Range / Metacomet Ridge

Geology
- Rock age: 200 million yrs.
- Mountain type(s): fault-block; igneous

Climbing
- Easiest route: Mount Holyoke auto road + Metacomet-Monadnock Trail

The Seven Sisters, part of the Holyoke Range and located within the Pioneer Valley region of Massachusetts, United States, are a series of basalt ridgeline knobs between Mount Holyoke and Mount Hitchcock (there are more than seven distinct peaks). The knobs offer scenic clifftop views interspersed with oak savanna woodlands. The highest "sister" has an elevation of 1,005 ft (306 m) and stands 800 ft (244 m) above the valley below. The terrain is very rugged; a continuous walk along the ridgeline includes an overall elevation change of 3,700 ft (1,128 m). The Seven Sisters are traversed by the Metacomet-Monadnock Trail and is part of the New England National Scenic Trail

The Seven Sisters are the location of the Seven Sisters Trail Race every spring, a twelve-mile (19 km) "out-and-back" run that often leaves its runners bloody, bruised and exhausted.

In response to a proposed suburban development on the Seven Sisters in the late 1990s, several non-profit groups and local governments worked together to block construction and acquire the ridgeline for the J.A. Skinner State Park.

Coincidentally, the seven sisters are near two of the Seven Sisters Colleges.

== See also ==
- Metacomet Ridge
- Metacomet-Monadnock Trail
- Robert Frost Trail (Massachusetts)

Adjacent summits

< West

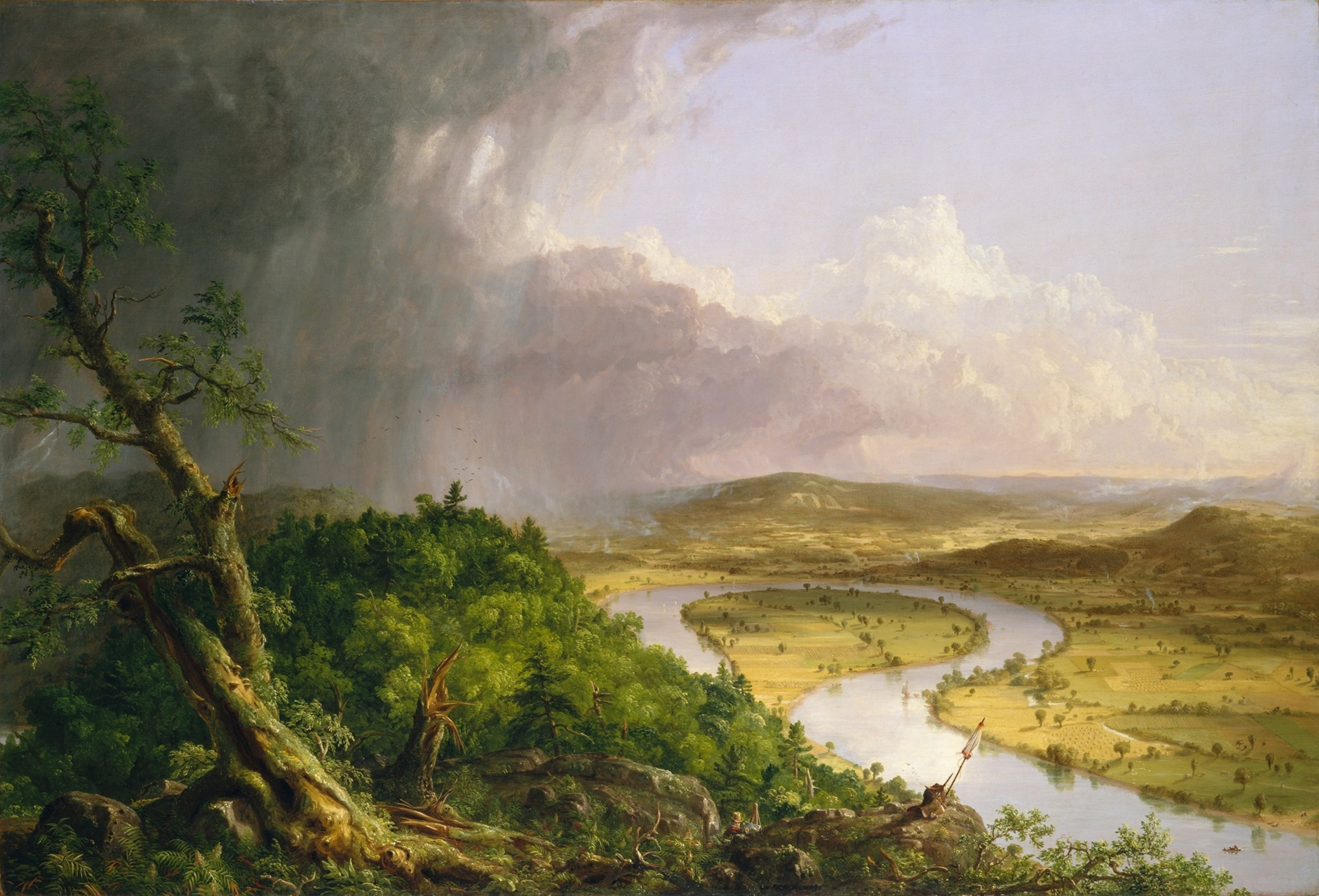
Mount Holyoke

East >
Mount Hitchcock
