= Mount Holyoke Range State Park =

State park in Hampshire County, Massachusetts

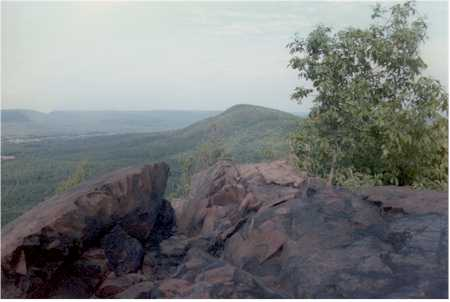
- Mount Norwottuck viewed from Bare Mountain

- Location within Massachusetts Location within the United States
- Location: Amherst, Granby, Hampshire, Massachusetts, United States
- Coordinates: 42°18′21″N 72°32′43″W
- Area: 3,729 acres (15.09 km^{2})
- Elevation: 965 ft (294 m)
- Established: Indeterminate
- Visitors: 36,420 (in 2012)
- Operator: Massachusetts Department of Conservation and Recreation
- Website: Mount Holyoke Range State Park

Mount Holyoke Range State Park is a state-owned, public recreation area encompassing the eastern half of the Holyoke Range in the Pioneer Valley region of Massachusetts. The state park is adjacent to J. A. Skinner State Park, which occupies the western half of the Holyoke Range. Both are managed by the Massachusetts Department of Conservation and Recreation.

== History ==
According to the Massachusetts Department of Conservation & Recreation (DCR), the Mount Holyoke Range State Park grew out of "a long-standing desire by the public and the Commonwealth to protect the range," and the state had been acquiring land in the area since 1940. Starting in 1975, the DCR made more focused efforts to acquire land or easements to create the park."

== Activities and amenities ==
Park trails are used for hiking, horseback riding, and cross-country skiing. Trails include sections of the long-distance Metacomet-Monadnock and Robert Frost trails. A visitors center is located near "The Notch" on Route 116 in Amherst. Picnicking and restricted hunting are also offered.

== See also ==
Bare Mountain
