= Mount Hitchcock =

Mountain in Massachusetts, United States

Coordinates: 42°18′20″N 72°32′44″W

Mount Hitchcock is a mountain located in South Hadley and Hadley, Massachusetts. It reaches 1,002 feet (305 m) at its peak in South Hadley. The Metacomet-Monadnock Trail runs through it as it does for all the Holyoke Range. To the west is Seven Sisters and Mount Holyoke. To its east is Bare Mountain.

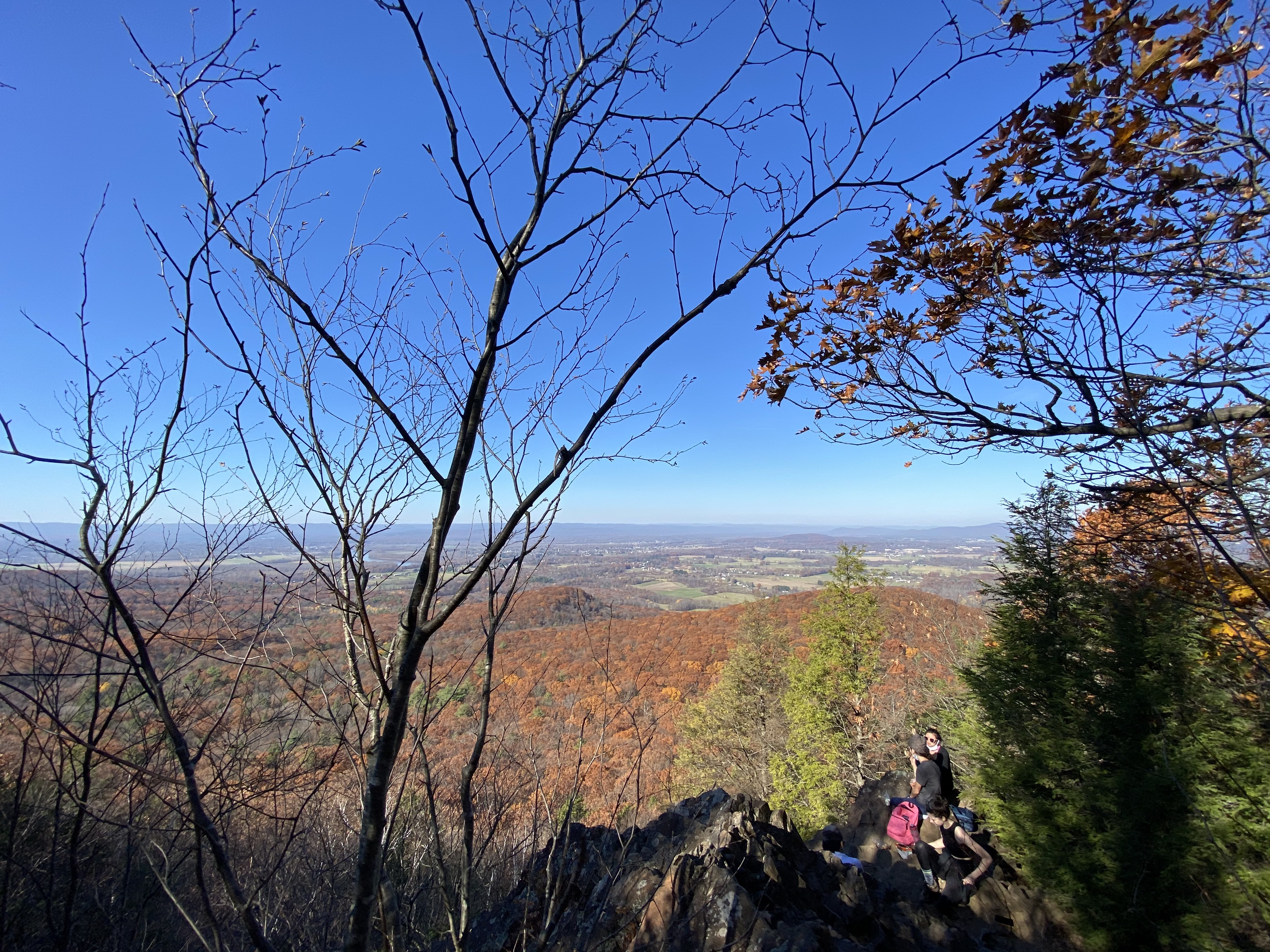
A view of the Pioneer Valley from Mount Hitchcock

Mount Hitchcock is the second highest peak in South Hadley with Bare Mountain being the highest by 8 feet. On the immediate northern shoulder of Hitchcock lies the highest point in Hadley. For many decades, Mount Hitchcock was thought to be the highest. However, carefully topographical and boundary analysis shows both that the peak of Bare Mountain is within the borders of the town and that it is 8 feet higher.

Mount Hitchcock is named after Edward Hitchcock, a former professor of geology at Amherst College. He studied the entire range from a geological and cultural point of view. Once there was a viewing tower on the top of the mountain. It has been taken down. Mount Hitchcock is probably the hardest peak in the Holyoke Range to get to since it is farthest from a road.
