= Connecticut River Greenway State Park =

Protected area in Massachusetts, US

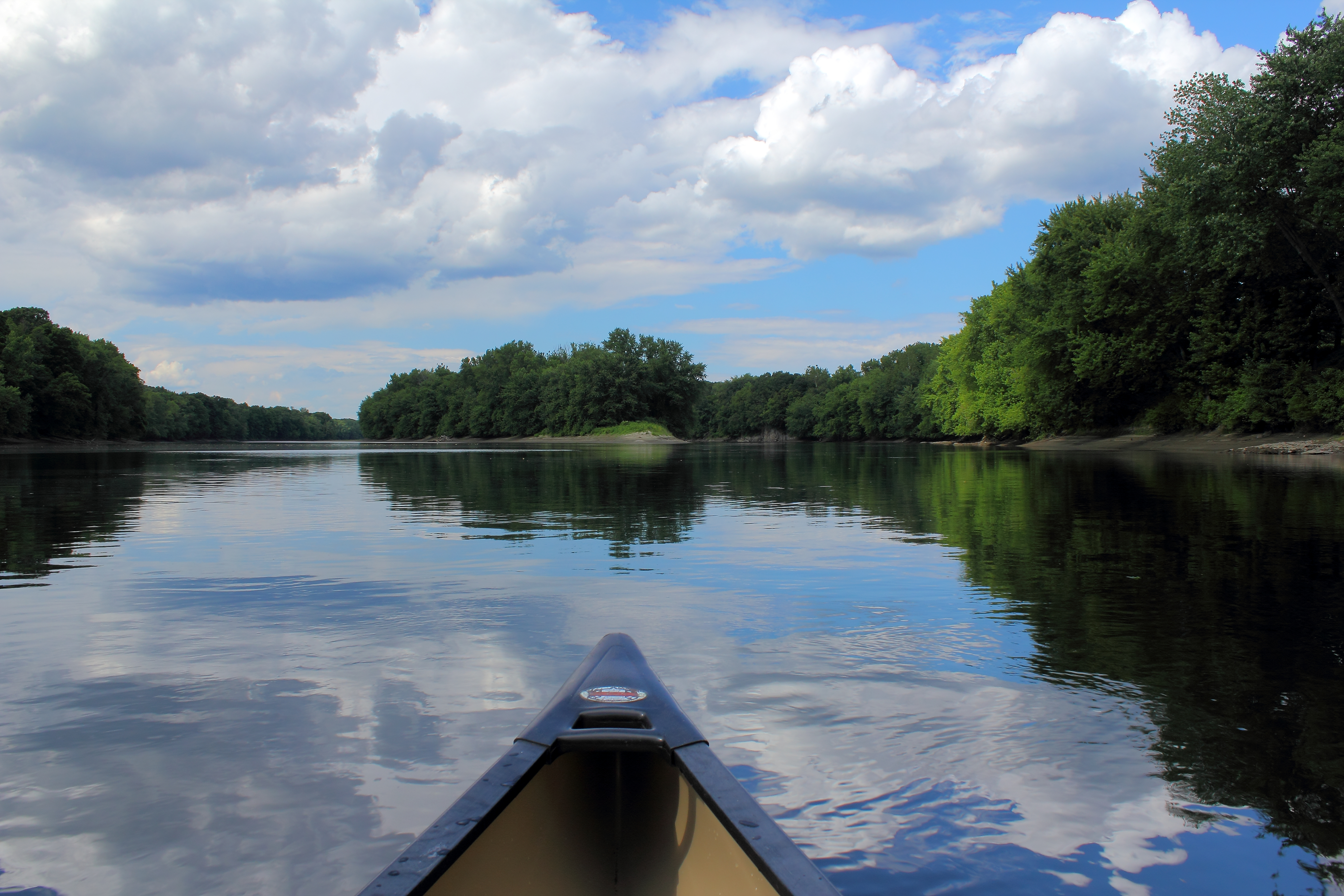
- Paddling north on the Connecticut River in Sunderland

- Location within Massachusetts Location within the United States
- Interactive map of Connecticut River Greenway State Park
- Location: Franklin, Hampden and Hampshire counties, Massachusetts, United States
- Coordinates: 42°36′27″N 72°32′30″W
- Area: 1,048 acres (424 ha)
- Administrator: Massachusetts Department of Conservation and Recreation
- Website: Official website

Connecticut River Greenway State Park is a protected environment with public recreation features that consists of separate state land holdings, including open spaces, parks, scenic vistas, and archaeological and historic sites, along the Connecticut River in the Pioneer Valley of western Massachusetts. The state park includes critical wildlife and plant habitat as well as areas providing public access to the river in its run across the state and is intertwined with other protected land including farmland under state-held agricultural preservation restrictions (a type of conservation easement), municipal and conservation land trust holdings, and state and national wildlife refuges.

== History ==
The Department of Conservation and Recreation acquired most of the parcels over a period of 20 years beginning around 1986, adding to earlier state holdings including Mount Tom State Reservation, Mount Holyoke Range State Park and J.A. Skinner State Park. Much of the DCR's land acquisition for the park was spearheaded by staff person Terry Blunt (1941–2010), of whom Director of State Parks and Recreation Priscilla Geigis said, "It's really been his leadership and his vision and his drive that has helped to coordinate so many different entities, landowners, towns, organizations, to come together and protect this very special place."

== Activities and amenities ==
The park's 12 miles (19 km) of protected shoreline offer opportunities for motorized and non-motorized boating, canoeing, fishing, and picnicking. Numerous access points are identified by the DCR where the river can be tackled:

Pauchaug Brook, Northfield
One mile north of Northfield Center on Rte. 63. Paved parking area and ramp which can accommodate canoes and motorboats.
Barton Cove, Gill
Rte 2 east of Turners Falls. Paved parking and ramp for motorboats or canoes.
Sunderland
North side of Sunderland Bridge in Sunderland. Canoe and fishing access. Limited parking.
Hatfield
One mile north of the center. Canoes and shallow draft lightweight boats.
Elwell Recreation Area, Northampton
Damon Road at Route 9 and I-91. Canoe and rowing only. Wheelchair accessible dock on the river. Limited parking.
Oxbow Ramp, Easthampton
Interstate 91 to exit 18 south on Rte. 5 in Easthampton. Thirty-five parking spaces and a paved ramp. Customarily used by high-powered recreational craft and larger fishing boats.
South Hadley/Chicopee Boat Access
James St. downstream from the Holyoke dam. Gravel ramp for shallow draft fishing boats. Popular during shad fishing season.
Chicopee Boat Access, Chicopee
Shallow, moderate and deep draft recreational and fishing boats. Easy canoe and rowing shell access.
