= Round Mountain (Massachusetts) =

Mountain in Massachusetts, USA

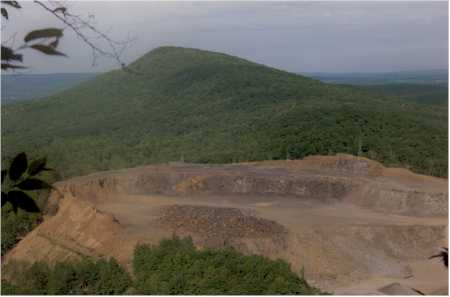
- Removal of Round Mountain by quarrying. 1989 photo; significantly more rock has since been removed.

Highest point
- Elevation: 780 feet (238 m) (approximate)
- Coordinates: 42°18′8.43″N 72°31′30.52″W

Geography
- Location: Granby, Amherst, and South Hadley, Massachusetts.
- Parent range: Holyoke Range / Metacomet Ridge

Geology
- Rock age: 200 Ma
- Mountain type(s): Fault-block; igneous

Climbing
- Easiest route: Metacomet-Monadnock Trail

Round Mountain, 780 feet (238 m) above sea level, was a peak of the Holyoke Range of traprock mountains located in the Connecticut River Valley of Massachusetts, and part of the greater Metacomet Ridge that stretches from Long Island Sound nearly to the Vermont border. Round Mountain was located mostly within Granby but some land was within the towns of Amherst and South Hadley, Massachusetts. It was traversed by the 110-mile (180 km) Metacomet-Monadnock Trail, but no longer, since the trail has been moved at that point to the north to avoid the quarry.

The mining operation started in 1897 and has all but removed the mountain. Together with Bare Mountain to the west, it formed a feature called the Notch. Within the Notch runs state highway Route 116. Travelers through the road could see mountains on both sides. This is no longer true since the quarry has leveled the earth to the east. Before the road was blasted through this area, a trolley passed through. The notch effect was even greater since the slopes of both mountains came down to the edge of the tracks. The bed of this former trolley way is still visible to the east of the current highway. Before the trolley bed it was a dirt highway, and before that a Native American foot path.

== Geology and ecology ==
Round Mountain, like much of the Metacomet Ridge, is composed of basalt, a volcanic rock. The rocks forming the mountain were extruded near the end of the Triassic Period when North America was rifting apart from Africa and Eurasia. Lava welled up from the rift and solidified into sheets of strata hundreds of feet thick. Subsequent faulting and earthquake activity tilted the strata, creating the dramatic cliffs and ridges of Bare Mountain. Hot, dry upper slopes, cool, moist ravines, and mineral-rich ledges of basalt talus produce a combination of microclimate ecosystems on the mountain that support plant and animal species uncommon in greater Massachusetts. See Metacomet Ridge for more information on the geology and ecosystem of Bare Mountain.

== See also ==
- Mount Norwottuck
