= Bare Mountain (Massachusetts) =

Mountain in Massachusetts, United States

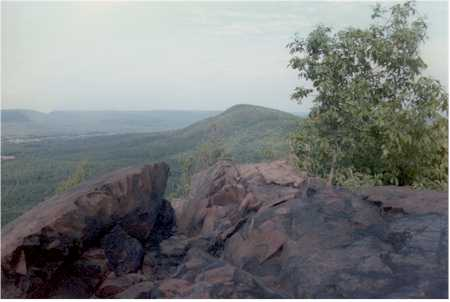
- View from the summit of Bare Mountain

Highest point
- Elevation: 1,014 ft (309 m)
- Coordinates: 42°18′13.31″N 72°31′52.88″W

Geography
- Location: Amherst and South Hadley, Massachusetts.
- Parent range: Holyoke Range / Metacomet Ridge

Geology
- Rock age: 200 Ma
- Mountain type(s): Fault-block; igneous

Climbing
- Easiest route: Metacomet-Monadnock Trail

Bare Mountain, 1,014 feet (309 m) above sea level, is a prominent peak of the Holyoke Range of traprock mountains located in the Connecticut River Valley of Massachusetts, and part of the greater Metacomet Ridge that stretches from Long Island Sound to nearly the Vermont border. The peak rises steeply from the river valley 1,000 feet (300 m) below; its bald summit offers sweeping views. Bare Mountain is located within the towns of Amherst and South Hadley, Massachusetts. Part of its northeastern flanks are in Hadley and part of its southern flanks are in Granby. It is traversed by the 110-mile (180 km) Metacomet-Monadnock Trail.

== Description and history ==
A hiking destination popular among local college students, Bare Mountain offers a 270° vista over the surrounding valleys to the north and south, and a bird's eye view across Mount Norwottuck and the eastern peaks of the Holyoke Range. Also visible from the top are the Round Mountain quarry and the campuses of the University of Massachusetts Amherst and Hampshire College to the north and Westover Joint Air Reserve Base to the south. A prime example of a basalt talus slope is located on the east side of the mountain, along the Metacomet-Monadnock Trail.

The next peak to its west is called Mount Hitchcock. The peak formerly to its east, Round Mountain, has been removed by quarrying activity; thus today, the peak to Bare Mountain's east is Mount Norwottuck in Granby. Both Round Mountain and Mount Norwottuck once had towers on their summits, but those have since been taken down. Bare Mountain is the highest point in the town of South Hadley. For many decades, Mount Hitchcock was thought to be the highest; however, carefully topographical and boundary analysis shows both that the peak of Bare Mountain is within the borders of the town and that it is eight feet higher than Mount Hitchcock.

The Five Colleges Library Depository is located on the north side of the mountain, within a subterranean bunker formerly occupied by the United States Air Force Strategic Air Command.

== Geology and ecology ==
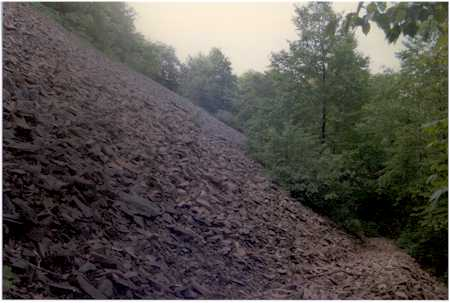
Talus slope on Bare Mountain

Bare Mountain, like much of the Metacomet Ridge, is composed of basalt, also called traprock, a volcanic rock. The lava from which the mountain is formed was erupted in the early Jurassic Period when North America was rifting apart from Africa and Eurasia. The lava welled up from the rift and solidified into sheets of strata hundreds of feet thick. Subsequent faulting and earthquake activity tilted the strata, creating the dramatic cliffs and ridges of Bare Mountain. Hot, dry upper slopes, cool, moist ravines, and mineral-rich ledges of basalt talus produce a combination of microclimate ecosystems on the mountain that support plant and animal species uncommon in greater Massachusetts. (See Metacomet Ridge for more information on the geology and ecosystem of Bare Mountain.)

== See also ==
- Bare Mountain (disambiguation) is also the name of several other mountains in the United States.
- Should not be confused with Bear Mountain, the name of more than 70 peaks in the United States alone, including two in Massachusetts.
- Metacomet Ridge
- Metacomet-Monadnock Trail
- Robert Frost Trail (Massachusetts)
- Adjacent summits:

< West	East >
Mount Hitchcock (no image)	Round Mountain (no longer existent, no image)
