= Friends of the Mt. Holyoke Range =

US nonprofit organization in Massachusetts

The Friends of the Mount Holyoke Range is a land conservation non-profit organization dedicated to conserving the land, ecosystem, and history of the Mount Holyoke Range in the Connecticut River Valley of Massachusetts. It has been successful in assisting with the conservation of several key parcels of land as well as the renovation of the Summit House on Mount Holyoke. The Friends collaborate closely with the Kestrel Land Trust and the Massachusetts Department of Conservation and Recreation. Additionally, they sponsor summer concerts and the Seven Sisters Road Race.
