= Mount Norwottuck =

Mountain in Massachusetts, United States

- Mount Norwottock
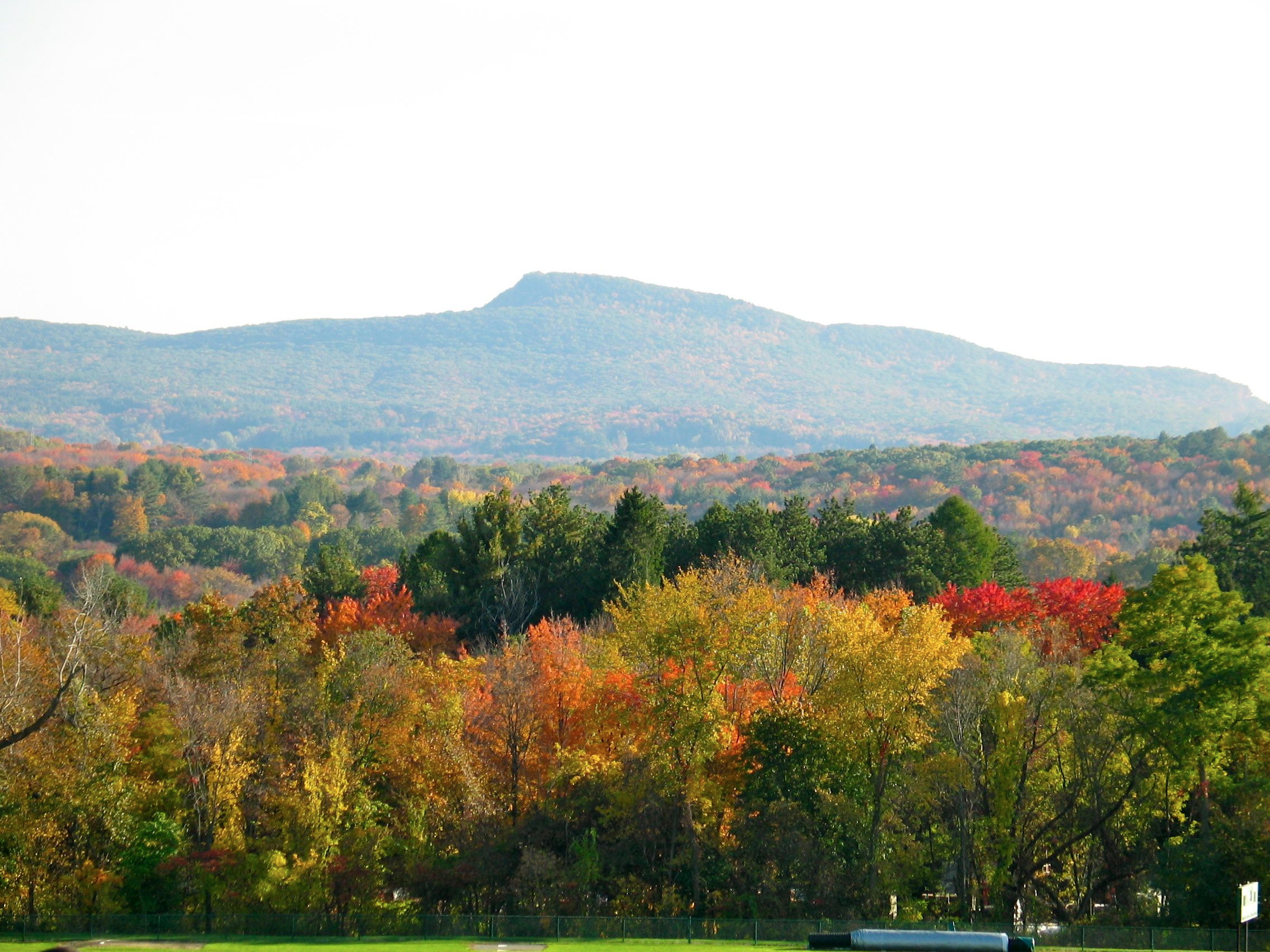
- Mount Norwottuck in the Mount Holyoke Range.

Highest point
- Elevation: 1,106 ft (337 m)
- Coordinates: 42°18′20″N 72°30′36″W

Geography
- Location: Amherst and Granby, Massachusetts.
- Parent range: Holyoke Range / Metacomet Ridge

Geology
- Rock age: 200 Ma
- Mountain type(s): Fault-block; igneous

Climbing
- Easiest route: Metacomet-Monadnock Trail

Mount Norwottuck or Mount Norwottock, 1,106 feet (337 m) above sea level, is the highest peak of the Holyoke Range of traprock mountains located in the Connecticut River Valley of Massachusetts and part of the greater Metacomet Ridge which stretches from Long Island Sound to nearly the Vermont border. The peak rises steeply from the valley 1,000 feet (300 m) below and offers sweeping views of the surrounding countryside. It is located within the towns of Amherst and Granby, Massachusetts.

== Description and history ==
Mount Norwottuck received its name from Edward Hitchcock, a former professor of geology at Amherst College with a colorful history. Hitchcock coined the term "Scenographical Geology" in 1841 to describe the dramatic geologic landscape of the Holyoke Range. Originally called Hilliard Knob, Hitchcock applied the Native American name Norwottuck to the mountain. Norwottuck is the Indian name of the village of Hadley. Hitchcock is also famous for suggesting that local dinosaur tracks discovered in the Triassic sediments near the range had been produced by an ancient species of bird (the relationship between modern birds and prehistoric dinosaurs would not be established by scientists until the latter half of the 20th century). A summit of the Holyoke Range to the west of Mount Norwottuck is named after Hitchcock.

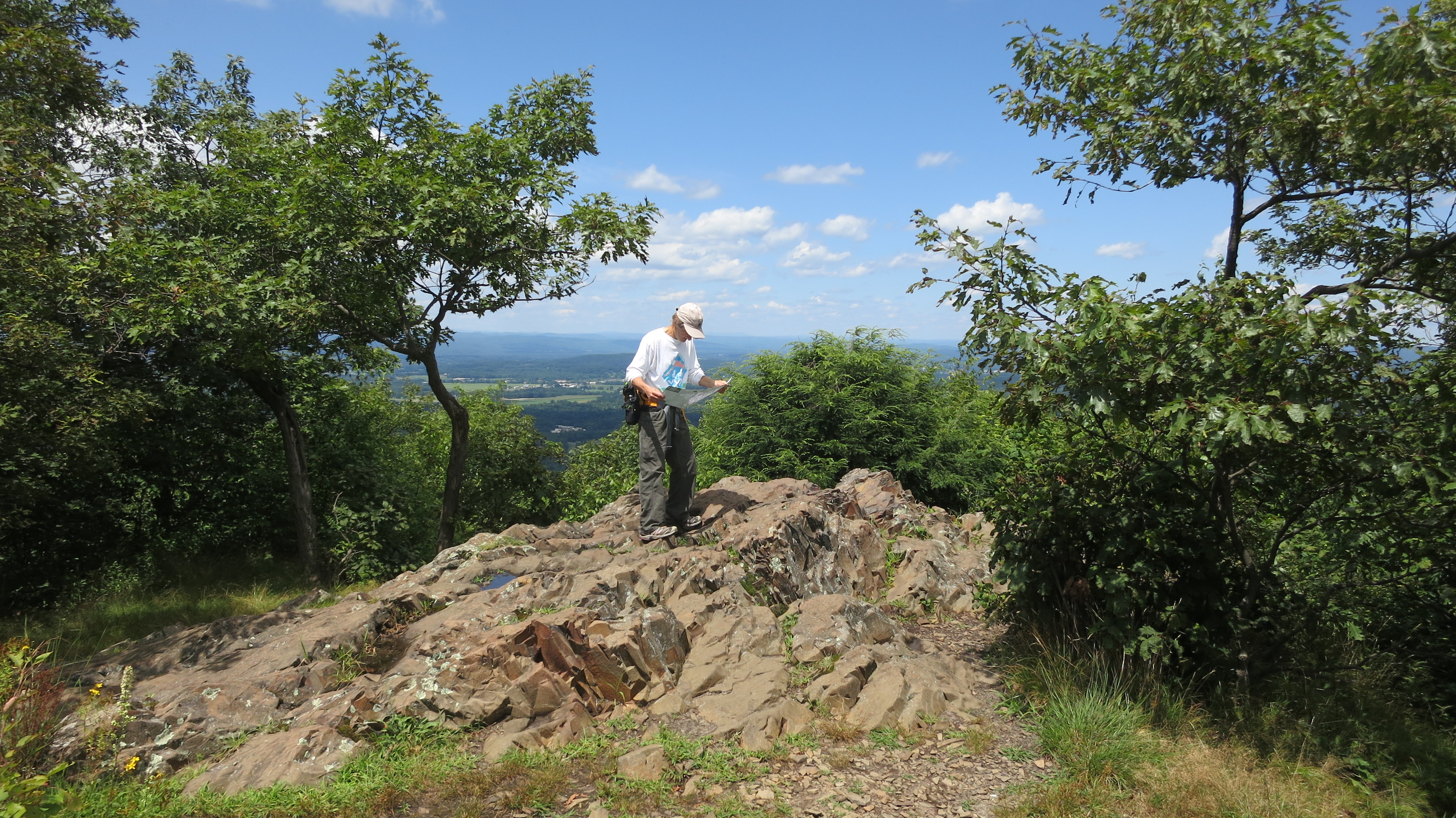
Hiker at the summit of Mt. Norwottuck, with distant view of the Connecticut River Valley to the northwest

Many miles of hiking trails cross Mount Norwottuck including the 114-mile (183 km) Metacomet-Monadnock Trail and the 47-mile (76 km) Robert Frost Trail. Sweeping views of the Pioneer Valley to the north and the University of Massachusetts Amherst campus can be had from various open ledges on the mountain. A lower, eastern ridge known as Rattlesnake Knob, 813 feet (248 m), also offers ledgetop views. The Horse Caves, believed to have been used as a bivouac by rebels during Shays' Rebellion, are a series of sedimentary rock overhangs located beneath the summit of Norwottuck. Most of Mount Norwottuck has been conserved as part of the Mount Holyoke Range State Park; local conservations commissions and private land holders own the remaining acreage.

From Mount Norwottuck, the ridgeline of the Holyoke Range continues east as Long Mountain and west as Bare Mountain. Formerly to its west was another mountain but it has been razed by quarrying operations. This was Round Mountain. Norwottuck is easily reached via the Notch Visitors Center. Beside the Frost Trail and the M&M Trail, there are a series of local trails that lead to the peak from its south.

== Geology and ecology ==
Mount Norwottock, like much of the Metacomet Ridge, is composed of basalt, also called traprock, a volcanic rock. The mountain formed near the end of the Triassic Period with the rifting apart of the North American continent from Africa and Eurasia. Lava welled up from the rift and solidified into sheets of strata hundreds of feet thick. Subsequent faulting and earthquake activity tilted the strata, creating the dramatic cliffs and ridges of Mount Norwottuck. Hot, dry upper slopes, cool, moist ravines, and mineral-rich ledges of basalt talus produce a combination of microclimate ecosystems on the mountain that support plant and animal species uncommon in greater Massachusetts.
