= Holyoke Range =

Mountain range in Massachusetts, USA

- Metacomet Ridge
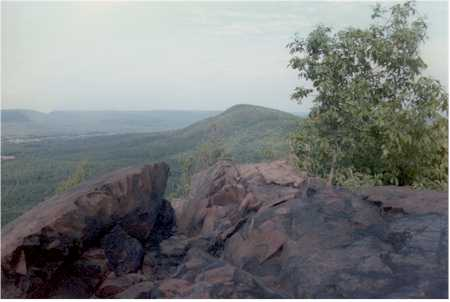
- View from Bare Mountain to Mount Norwottuck

Highest point
- Peak: Mount Norwottuck
- Elevation: 1,106 ft (337 m)
- Coordinates: 42°18′20″N 72°30′36″W

Dimensions
- Length: 9.5 mi (15.3 km) east-west

Geography
- Country: United States
- State: Massachusetts
- Range coordinates: 42°18′15″N 72°32′20″W

Geology
- Rock ages: Triassic and Jurassic
- Rock types: fault-block, igneous and sedimentary

The Holyoke Range or Mount Holyoke Range is a traprock mountain range located in the Connecticut River Valley of Massachusetts. It is a subrange of the narrow, linear Metacomet Ridge that extends from Long Island Sound near New Haven, Connecticut, north through the Connecticut River Valley of Massachusetts to the Vermont border. It is also a subrange of the Appalachian Mountains. A popular hiking destination, the range is known for its anomalous east–west orientation, high ledges and its scenic character. It is also notable for its unique microclimate ecosystems and rare plant communities, as well as significant historic sites, such as the Mount Holyoke Summit House and the Horse Caves.

== Holyoke Range vs. Mount Holyoke Range ==
Both names for the range are frequently cited by reputable published sources. For instance, both the Massachusetts Department of Conservation and Recreation and the non-profit Friends of the Mount Holyoke Range use Mount Holyoke Range, while the other form, Holyoke Range, is used in several different map and guide sources (the USGS 1990 Belchertown 1:25000 scale topographic map, two longstanding popular retail hiking maps published by Newall Printing, the 1999 version of the Appalachian Mountain Club (AMC)'s Metacomet-Monadnock Trail Guide, and the 1989 version of the AMC's Massachusetts and Rhode Island Trail Guide). However, the AMC's 2004 Massachusetts Trail Guide uses "Mt. Holyoke Range" and the United States Board on Geographic Names now uses "Mount Holyoke Range".) Both names as well as the abbreviated Mt. Holyoke Range are used locally.

== Geography ==
Topographic map of the Holyoke Range

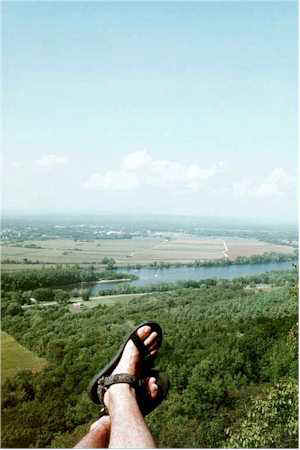
View from ledges on Mount Holyoke. Connecticut River visible below.

The Holyoke Range, located within the towns of South Hadley, Hadley, Granby, Amherst, and Belchertown, rises steeply between 300 feet (91 m) and 1,100 feet (335 m) above the Connecticut River Valley below; it has an east–west orientation and is roughly 9.5 miles (15.3 km) long by 2.5 miles (4.0 km) wide at its widest point, although the steepness of the terrain makes the actual square mileage much larger. The high point of range is the summit of Mount Norwottuck, 1,106 feet (337 m) above sea level.

Notable peaks include (from west to east) Mount Holyoke at 935 feet (285 m); the Seven Sisters, a series of ridgeline knobs with a high point of 945 feet (288 m); Mount Hitchcock at 1,002 feet (305 m); Bare Mountain at 1,014 feet (309 m); Mount Norwottuck at 1,106 feet (337 m); Rattlesnake Knob at 787 feet (240 m); Long Mountain at 920 feet (280 m); and Harris Hill at 550 feet (168 m). Round Mountain between Bare and Norwottuck has been removed by quarrying. A series of smaller, unnamed traprock hills continues from Long Mountain to the eastern end of the range. Another series of hills descends north from the range into the towns of Hadley and Amherst. Some of these have names: Tinker Hill at 685 feet (209 m) and Little Tinker Hill at 545 feet (166 m) are located at the base of Mount Hitchcock in Hadley; Mount Pollux at 331 feet (101 m) and Mount Castor at 308 feet (94 m) are between Mount Norwottuck and the center of Amherst. The Metacomet Ridge, of which the Holyoke Range is a part, continues west and south across the Connecticut River as the Mount Tom Range. The Metacomet Ridge is broken to the north; the Holyoke Range is separated from the Pocumtuck Ridge, 9 miles (14 km) away by a relatively low-lying area punctuated with occasional rises.

The north side of the Holyoke Range drains into the Fort River, thence to the Connecticut River and Long Island Sound; the south side drains into Bachelor Brook, then into the Connecticut River.

== History ==
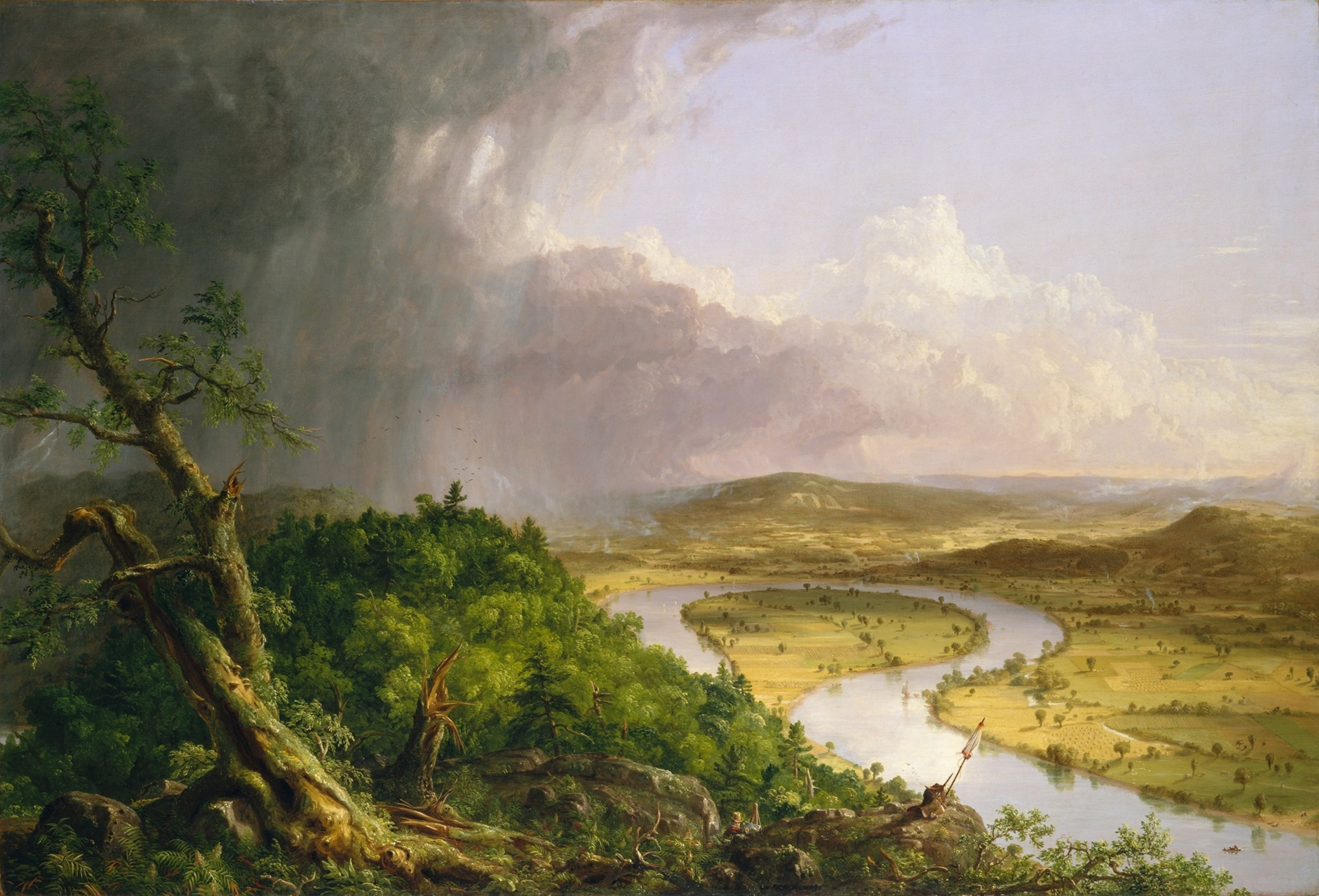
"The Oxbow" by Thomas Cole, 1836

Mount Holyoke, at the western edge of the range, received its name from Elizur Holyoke, a 17th-century colonial settler of the Springfield, Massachusetts, region. Folklore suggests that Holyoke named the mountain after himself. The City of Holyoke, Mount Holyoke College, and the Holyoke Range were in turn named after the mountain.

Before 1821, very little history had been recorded about the Holyoke Range that distinguished it from the surrounding landscape. Native Americans inhabited the area around the Holyoke Range for at least 10,000 years; they grew maize, tobacco, beans, squash, and other crops in the Connecticut River floodplain, clearing small sections of forest by burning to make room for their crops. They hunted and fished in the area, and made tools and arrowheads from the basalt rock of the Metacomet Ridge. Tensions between the Pocumtuc tribe and colonial settlers, who began arriving in the region in the mid 17th century, reached a head in 1675 with the outbreak of King Philip's War, a conflict involving colonists and a confederacy of Native American tribes across southern New England under the leadership of the sachem Metacomet. More settlers arrived after the war ended with the defeat of the Native Americans, and by the early 19th century, most of the region's current towns had been established, and most of the land had been cleared of trees to make room for farms. Farmers were particularly attracted to the rich soils of the region—one of the few places in New England where tobacco can be grown with commercial success. Rugged highlands, such as the Holyoke Range and Mount Tom Range, although unsuitable for farming, were often harvested of timber to produce charcoal, a primary source of fuel for the steel industry prior to the extraction of coal in the mid-Appalachians. Highland areas were also burned of timber when lowland fires, set to clear land for farms, raged out of control. However, by the early 20th century, after agricultural interests shifted west and charcoaling became unprofitable, rural New England became largely forested again. A 2004 ecological resource study conducted for the National Park Service suggests that the Metacomet Ridge may have remained more-or-less forested (cleared only intermittently) throughout New England's agricultural period, thereby allowing the area to retain its biologic diversity through the 20th century.

Increasing urbanization and industrialization in 19th-century New England resulted in an opposing aesthetic transcendentalist movement characterized by the paintings of the Hudson River School of American landscape painters such as Frederic Edwin Church and Thomas Cole (who, in 1836, famously painted the Connecticut River from sketches he made from the summit of Mount Holyoke), the work of landscape architects such as Frederick Law Olmsted, and the writings of philosophers like Henry David Thoreau and Ralph Waldo Emerson. This philosophical, artistic, and environmental movement transformed many areas of the Metacomet Ridge (as well as other places in New England) from a commercial resource to a recreational and aesthetic resource.

Hotels, parks, and summer estates were built on the mountains from the mid-1880s to the early 20th century. Route 47 borders its west end. Down its middle is cut Route 116 from South Hadley to Amherst. Formerly, along the east edge of this highway ran the Holyoke-to-Amherst trolley tracks. The bed is still visible along most of its mountain route.

=== The Mount Holyoke Summit House ===
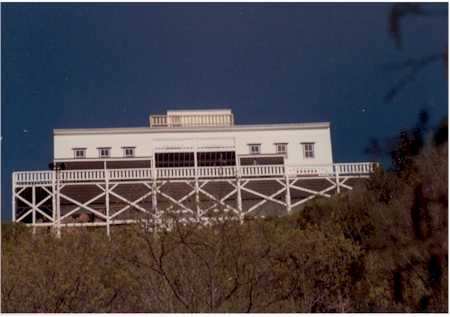
Mount Holyoke Summit House

In 1821, an 18-by-24-foot (5.5 by 7.3 m) guest cabin was built on Mount Holyoke by a local committee—one of the first New England summit houses. The property changed hands several times between 1821 and 1851, when it was bought and rebuilt as a two-story, eight-room hotel. Local entrepreneurs John and Frances French were the primary owners; between 1851 and 1900, the hotel and property were subject to a number of upgrades and related construction projects including a covered tramway to the summit of the mountain (first drawn by horse, then mechanized), a railroad from the base of the mountain to a steamboat dock on the Connecticut River, and the construction of a number of outbuildings and trails. With passenger steamship to the connecting summit railway established, the Mount Holyoke "Prospect House" became a popular tourist destination. Competing establishments were built on Mount Tom and Mount Nonotuck across the Connecticut River, and on Sugarloaf Mountain and Mount Toby to the north. The property passed hands again in the early 20th century, to chain hotelier Joseph Allen Skinner, who eventually donated the hotel and property to the Commonwealth of Massachusetts for a state park in 1939 on the condition that the park be named after him (now the J.A. Skinner State Park). The summit house suffered from storm damage and lack of maintenance until the mid-1980s, when it was renovated as a museum through local volunteer efforts supported by the Commonwealth of Massachusetts.

=== Other historic events ===
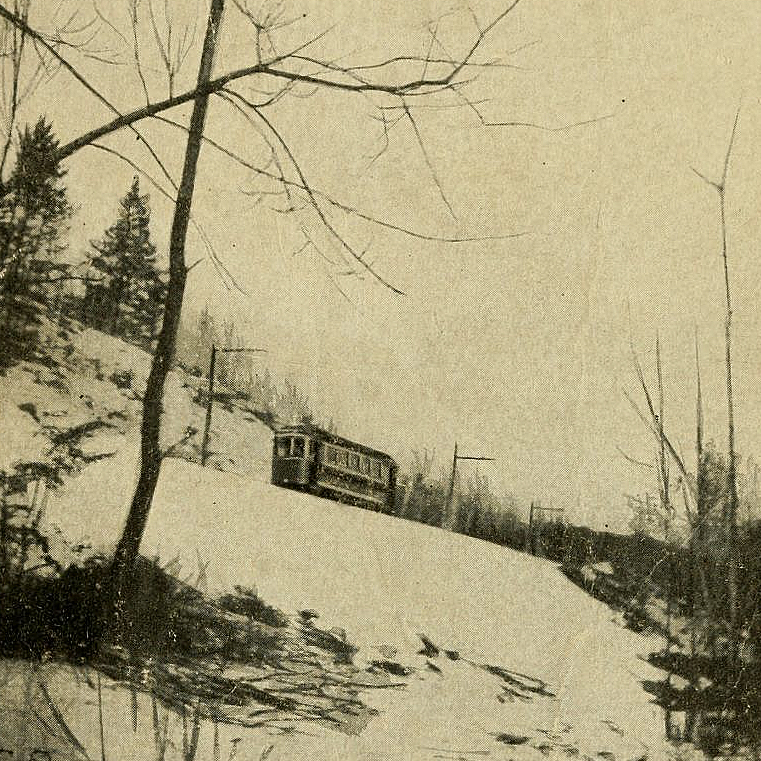
An Amherst & Sunderland Street Railway car passes through The Notch in 1903, which was used as both a passenger and freight route for interurban rail service until 1932.

- The Horse Caves, a series of sedimentary rock overhangs located many hundreds of feet beneath the summit of Mount Norwottuck, are believed to have been used as a bivouac by rebels during Shays's Rebellion of 1786.
- Edward Hitchcock, a former professor of geology at Amherst College with a colorful history, coined the term "Scenographical Geology" in 1841 to describe the dramatic geologic landscape of the Holyoke Range. Hitchcock renamed several of the natural features of the range, including Mount Norwottuck (originally called Hilliard Knob) and Titan's Piazza, a columnar basalt outlook on Mount Holyoke. Hitchcock is also famous for suggesting that local dinosaur tracks discovered in the Triassic sediments near the range had been produced by an ancient species of bird (the relationship between modern birds and prehistoric dinosaurs would not be established by scientists until the latter half of the 20th century). A summit of the Holyoke Range is named after Hitchcock.
- Every year in October since 1838, students from nearby Mount Holyoke College participate in Mountain Day. On that day, at the sound of ringing bells from Abbey Chapel on a random Autumn morning, all classes are cancelled and students hike to the summit of Mount Holyoke.
- On May 27, 1944, a B-24, flying a night training mission out of Westover Army Air Field in Chicopee, Massachusetts, crashed into the south flank of the range, killing all ten crewmen. A memorial plaque was placed onto the summit of Mount Holyoke to eulogize the disaster. The plaque is about 150 feet (46 m) east of the house, but the actual crash site is down the southern flanks in the woods.
- The Five Colleges Library Depository is located on the north side of Bare Mountain in the Holyoke Range, within a subterranean bunker formerly occupied by the United States Air Force Strategic Air Command (SAC). The bunker was created to provide commanders of SAC at the Westover Air Force Base in Chicopee, Massachusetts, shelter in the event of a Cold-War-era nuclear attack. The three-story bunker features 3-foot-thick (0.9 m) walls, a 1.5-foot-thick (0.5 m) steel blast door, and is located 20 feet (6 m) underground.
- Both the Holyoke Range and the Mount Tom Range were part of a 1966 proposal by the National Park Service for a "Connecticut River National Recreation Area." Although the project was never realized, it has been followed through in spirit by a number of similar local and national conservation efforts, including an increased effort to acquire land on both ranges for state park expansion and the creation by the Commonwealth of Massachusetts of the Connecticut River Greenway State Park. On March 30, 2009, as part of U.S. Public Law 111-11 (Section 5202), the range's Metacomet-Monadnock Trail section was incorporated in the new National Scenic Trail called the New England Trail. See also the original National Park Service proposal and study.

=== The Tofu Curtain ===
The Holyoke Range has been nicknamed the Tofu Curtain as a divider between Hampshire and Hampden Counties. The nickname refers to a socioeconomic, cultural, and sometimes political divide between the wealthier Hampshire County and its affluent Five College Consortium to the north and the working-class Hampden County to the south, which comprises the cities of Holyoke and Springfield, as well as their surrounding towns and cities. While this southern part of the Massachusetts' Pioneer Valley is the second-largest metropolitan region in the state, areas of it are economically depressed with Holyoke's average 2017 annual household income ranked at $14,000. Meanwhile, the towns of Northampton and Amherst to the north are home to many worker cooperatives and small businesses that often manufacture or sell natural products (such as tofu) to a more affluent population.

== Geology and environment ==
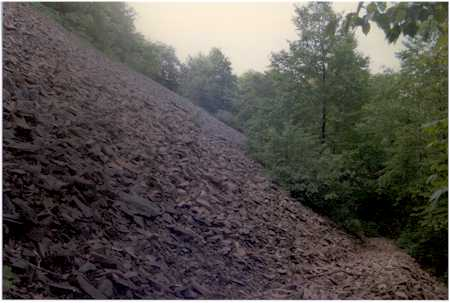
Talus slopes on Bare Mountain

The ridge of the Holyoke Range was formed 200 million years ago during the late Triassic and early Jurassic periods and is composed of traprock, also known as basalt, an extrusive volcanic rock. Basalt is a dark-colored rock, but the iron within it weathers to a rusty brown when exposed to the air, lending the ledges a distinct reddish appearance. Basalt frequently breaks into octagonal and pentagonal columns, creating a unique "postpile" appearance. Huge slopes made of fractured basalt talus are visible beneath many of the ledges; they are particularly visible along the Metacomet-Monadnock Trail on Bare Mountain. The basalt ridges are the product of several massive lava flows hundreds of feet deep that welled up in faults created by the rifting apart of North America from Eurasia and Africa. These basalt floods of lava happened over a period of 20 million years.

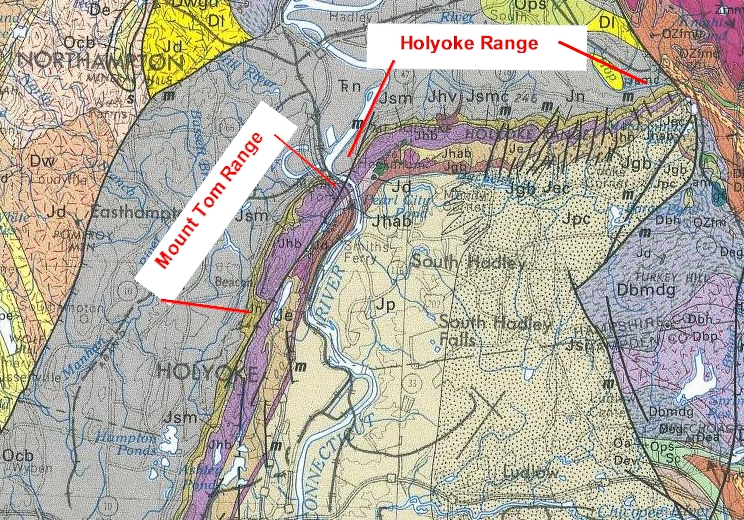
Bedrock geology. Purple = basalt; surrounding brown & blue-grey = sedimentary rock

Erosion occurring between the eruptions deposited deep layers of sediment between the lava flows, which eventually lithified into sedimentary rock. The resulting "layer cake" of basalt and sedimentary sheets eventually faulted and tilted upward. Subsequent erosion wore away the weaker sedimentary layers a faster rate than the basalt layers, leaving the abruptly tilted edges of the basalt sheets exposed, creating the distinct linear ridge and dramatic cliff faces visible today. One way to imagine this is to picture a layer cake tilted slightly up with some of the frosting (the sedimentary layer) removed in between. One of the best places to view this layer-cake structure in the Holyoke Range is on Mount Norwottuck. The summit of Norwottuck is made of basalt; directly beneath the summit are the Horse Caves, a deep overhang where the weaker sedimentary layer has worn away at a more rapid rate than the basalt layer above it.

The Holyoke Range hosts a combination of microclimates unusual in New England. Dry, hot upper ridges support oak savannas, often dominated by chestnut oak and a variety of understory grasses and ferns. Eastern red cedar, a dry-loving species, clings to the barren edges of cliffs. Backslope plant communities tend to be more similar to the adjacent Berkshire plateau containing species common to the northern hardwood and oak-hickory forest types. Eastern hemlock crowds narrow ravines, blocking sunlight and creating damp, cooler growing conditions with associated cooler-climate plant species. Talus slopes are especially rich in nutrients and support a number of calcium-loving plants uncommon in Massachusetts. Because the traprock ridges generate such varied terrain, they are the home of several plant and animal species that are state-listed or globally rare, such as the timber rattlesnake.

The Holyoke Range is also an important seasonal raptor migration path.

== Recreation ==
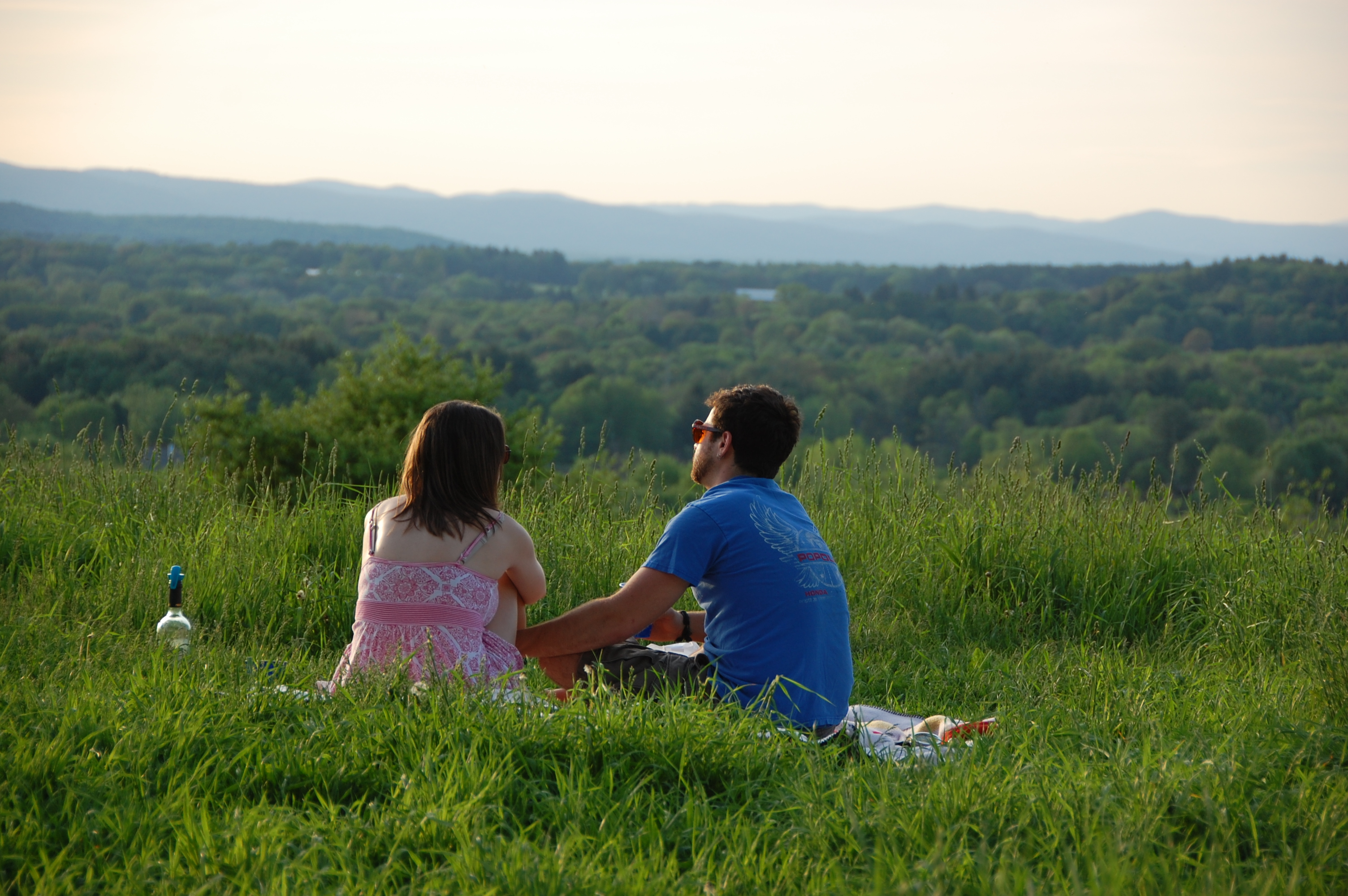
Two people enjoy the view from Mount Pollux

A seasonal auto road climbs to the summit of Mount Holyoke and many miles of trails criss-cross the range, including the 110-mile (180 km) Metacomet-Monadnock Trail and the 47-mile (76 km) Robert Frost Trail. The range is used for picnicking, hiking, backcountry skiing, cross-country skiing, mountain biking, horseback riding, bird watching, hunting (in season), and snowshoeing. An interpretive center is located in "The Notch" on Route 116 on the tri-border of Granby, Amherst, and South Hadley.

== Conservation ==
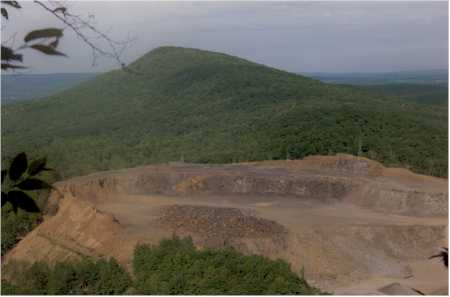
Obliteration of Round Mountain by quarrying. 1989 photo; significantly more rock has been removed since then.

Much of the Holyoke Range has been conserved as part of Massachusetts's J.A. Skinner State Park and Mount Holyoke Range State Park. Other parcels are managed by non-profit organizations and town conservation commissions, or are private property. In 2000, the Holyoke Range was included in a study by the National Park Service for the designation of a new National Scenic Trail which was designated on March 30, 2009, as the New England National Scenic Trail, which includes most of the Metacomet-Monadnock Trail in Massachusetts and the Mattabesett Trail and Metacomet Trail trails in Connecticut.

Quarrying on the range has resulted in the loss of a prominent peak, Round Mountain, once located between Bare Mountain and Mount Norwottuck. In response to a proposed suburban development on the Seven Sisters part of the range in the late 1990s, several non-profit groups and local governments worked together to block construction and acquire the ridgeline for the Skinner State Park. Non-profit conservation organizations invested in the protection of the Holyoke Range and its viewshed include the Kestrel Trust, The Valley Land Fund, the Berkshire Chapter of the Appalachian Mountain Club, and the Friends of the Mount Holyoke Range.

== See also ==
- List of subranges of the Appalachian Mountains
- Metacomet Ridge
- Robert Frost Trail (Massachusetts)
- Metacomet-Monadnock Trail
- Nearby summits:

< West

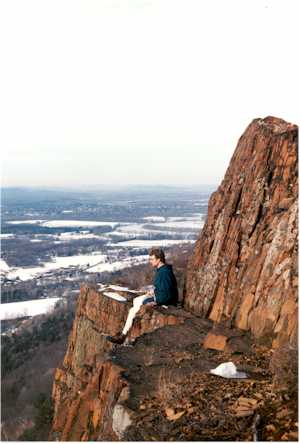
Mount Tom Range
