= Robert Frost Trail =

Footpath in Massachusetts, USA

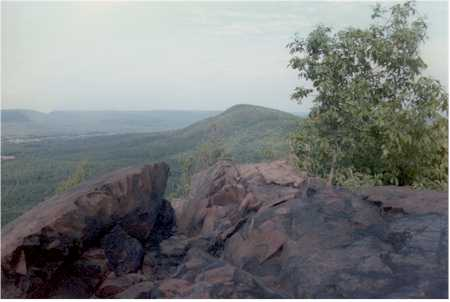
- The Robert Frost Trail now crosses the summit of Bare Mountain
- Length: 47 mi (76 km)
- Location: Eastern Hampshire County and Franklin County, Massachusetts.
- Use: hiking, snowshoeing, backcountry skiing, other
- Highest point: Dry Hill, 1,289 ft (393 m)
- Lowest point: Connecticut River, 89 ft (27 m)
- Difficulty: easy, with some rugged sections
- Season: easiest spring to fall
- Hazards: deer ticks, poison ivy

The Robert Frost Trail is a 47-mile (76 km) long footpath that passes through the eastern Connecticut River Valley of Massachusetts. The trail runs from the Connecticut River in South Hadley, Massachusetts to Ruggles Pond in Wendell State Forest, through both Hampshire and Franklin County and includes a number of scenic features such as the Holyoke Range, Mount Orient, Puffer's Pond, and Mount Toby. The trail is named after the poet Robert Frost, who lived and taught in the area from 1916 to 1938.

== Trail description ==
Although only 47 miles long, the Robert Frost Trail takes in a diverse patchwork of habitats, terrain, and scenery. The trail traverses trap rock Metacomet Ridge with its microclimate ecosystems; wetland habitat; ponds; farmland; deep ravines; wooded ledges; river banks; reservoirs; historic mill ponds; and dense forests. One segment of the trail follows a narrow greenway that successfully weaves through a small suburban development; another passes through a revegetated landfill; and yet another follows a mowed path along railroad tracks.

The Robert Frost Trail has undergone periodic extensions to its length. The most recent included routing the trail over the western half of the Holyoke Range; a proposed northern extension would bring the trail to the Deerfield River. Outdated internet and print sources still describe the trail as either 33 or 40 miles (53 or 64 km) long.

The 110-mile (180 km) Metacomet-Monadnock Trail intersects the Robert Frost Trail several times, as do a lengthy network of smaller trails (many managed by the Amherst Department of Conservation), allowing for a variety of loop-hike possibilities.

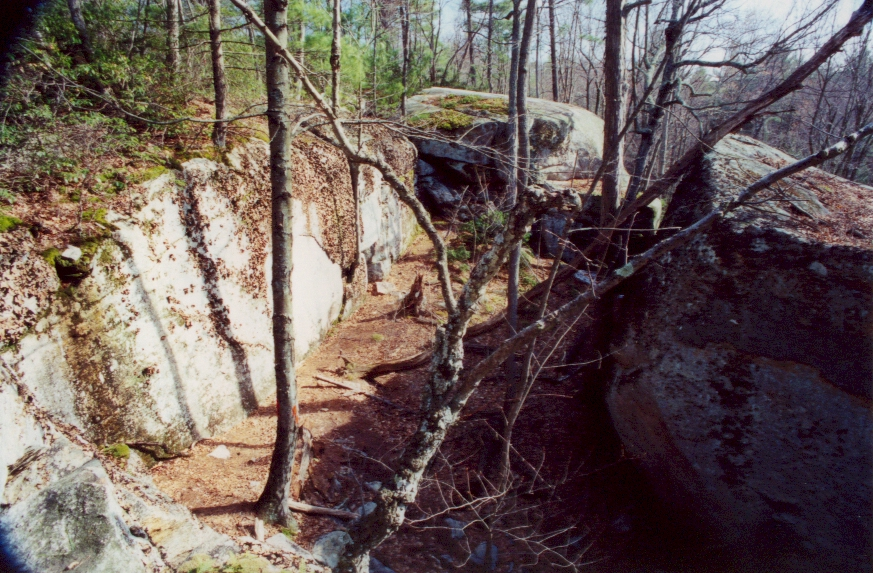
The Pigpen

=== Sections ===
The southernmost section of the Robert Frost Trail weaves over and around the trap rock Holyoke Range several times. It follows the northern slopes of the range from Mount Holyoke to Taylor Notch, along the ridge line, descending south to Lithia Springs Reservoir, before climbing again to the ridgeline, where it goes north of Mount Hitchcock and Bare Mountain, then crosses to the north slope of the range before summiting Rattlesnake Knob (the eastern peak of Mount Norwottuck), and Long Mountain. Microclimate ecosystems, rare plant habitats, vernal pools, caves, and abrupt cliffs are the fare. Also located on this trail section are the Horse Caves, an overhang of sedimentary rock said to have been used as a bivouac by rebels during Shays' Rebellion.

The middle section of the Robert Frost Trail traverses the Connecticut River Valley in the vicinity of eastern Amherst, south Leverett, and abutting towns. Highlights along the way include the 1,000-acre (4.0 km^{2}) Lawrence Swamp, Pomroy Pond, Harkness Brook Ravine, Amethyst Brook, the Mount Orient ledges, Atkins Reservoir, Cushman Brook Ravine, Puffer's Pond, and the Leverett Knobs. The ledges of Mount Orient and the swimming beach at Puffer's Pond are popular locally. Harkness Brook, Amethyst Brook, and Cushman brook offer shaded brookside walking and cascades. Lawrence Swamp is a major local wildlife habitat and aquifer.

The northern section of the Robert Frost Trail traverses the summit of Mount Toby, Stoddard Hill, and Dry Hill. Features along the route include the Mount Toby firetower, Cranberry Pond, the Pigpen, a historic sawmill and dam, and Ruggles Pond in Wendell State Forest. Mount Toby, regarded as one of the most biologically diverse locations in New England, is a conglomerate rock massif unique in Massachusetts. The firetower on its summit provides panoramic views. Roaring Falls, located 0.25 miles (400 m) off the Robert Frost Trail on Mount Toby, plunges 100 feet (30 m) over ledges in a series of pools, chutes, and cataracts. Cranberry Pond, a glacial kettle pond, is popular for non-motorized boating and ice skating. The Pigpen is a 20 feet (6.1 m) wide by 15 feet (4.6 m) high natural rock enclosure overshadowed by steep ledges, while Ruggles Pond, the centerpiece of Wendell State Forest, is a popular swimming hole.

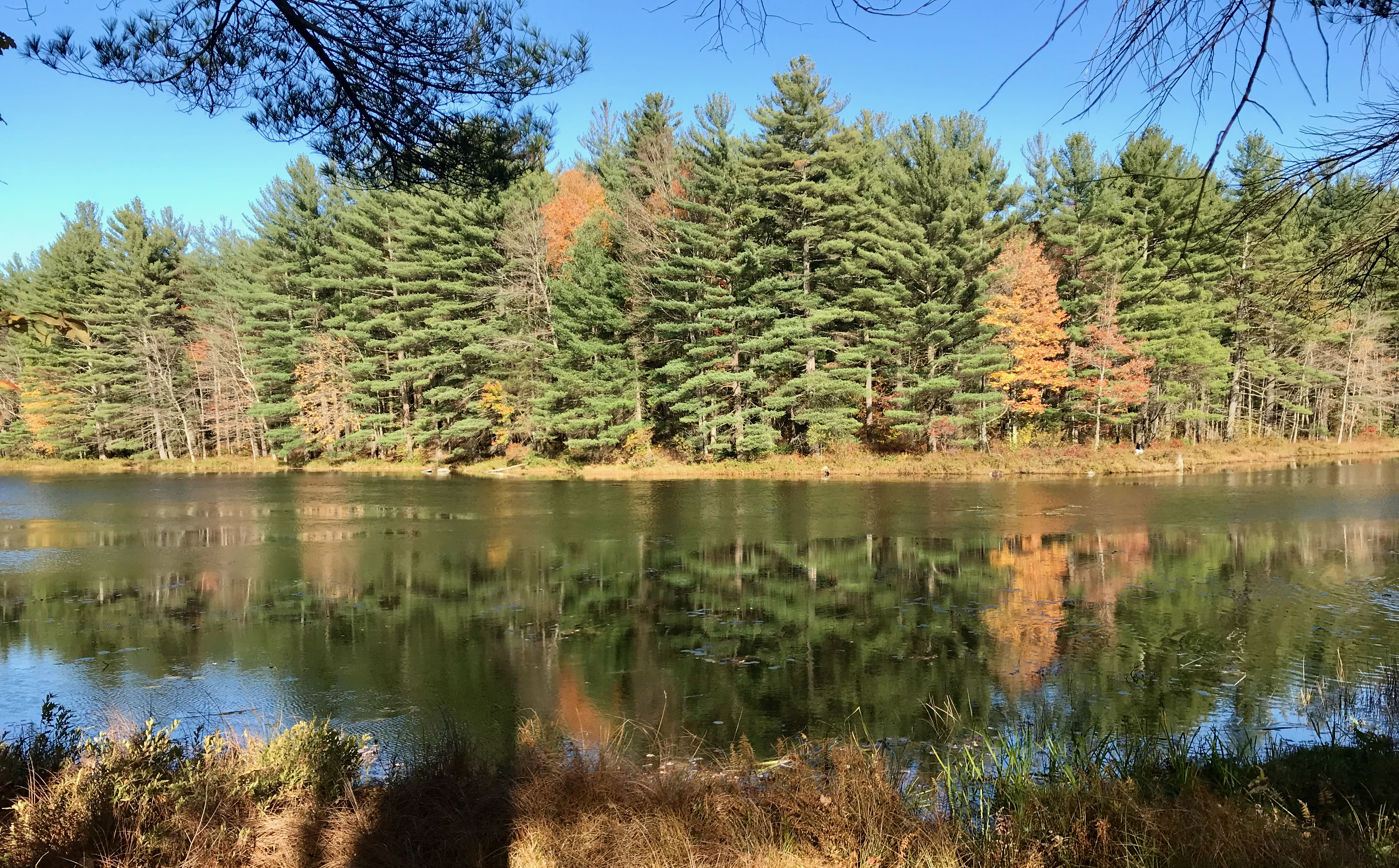
Ruggles Pond, northeastern terminus of the Robert Frost Trail and junction with the New England National Scenic Trail in Wendell State Forest.

=== Trail communities ===
The Robert Frost Trail passes through land in the following incorporated towns: Hadley, South Hadley, Amherst, Granby, Belchertown, Pelham, Shutesbury, Leverett, Sunderland, Wendell and Montague.

== Geology and Ecology ==
The Robert Frost Trail might be divided into three general geo-ecological landscapes.

=== The Holyoke Range and Mount Toby ===
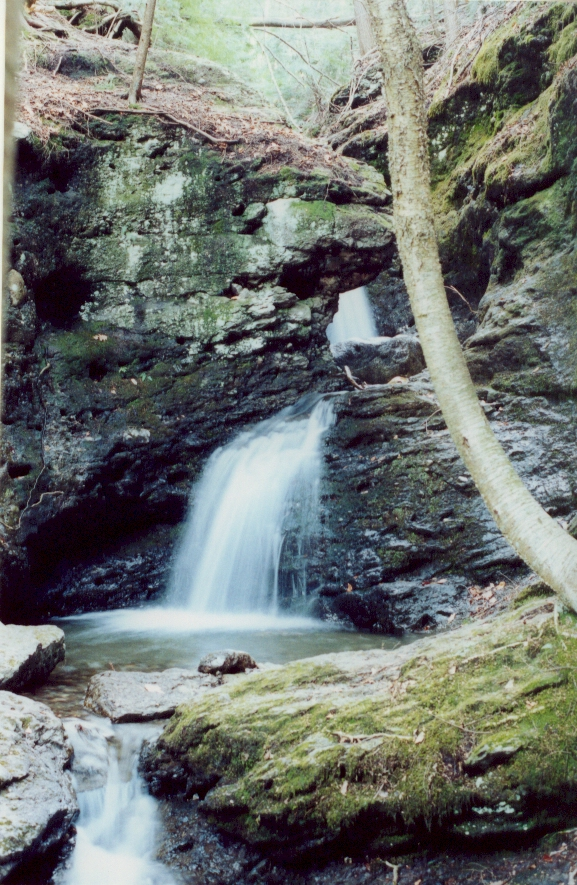
Roaring Brook Falls, a short distance from the Robert Frost Trail on Mount Toby

Both the Holyoke Range and Mount Toby were formed 200 million years ago between the end of the Triassic period and the beginning of the Jurassic. The Holyoke Range, part of the Metacomet Ridge that extends 100 miles (160 km) south to Long Island Sound, are composed of basalt, an extrusive volcanic rock. This basalt ridge is the product of several massive lava flows hundreds of feet deep that welled up in faults created by the rifting apart of North America from Eurasia and Africa over a period of 20 million years. Basalt is a dark colored rock, but the iron within it weathers to a rusty brown when exposed to the air, lending it a distinct reddish appearance. Huge slopes made of fractured basalt scree, such as the one beneath the cliffs on Bare Mountain, are common.

Erosion occurring between the eruptions deposited deep layers of sediment between the lava flows, which eventually lithified into sedimentary rock, such as the conglomerate rock Mount Toby is composed of. The resulting "layer cake" of basalt and sedimentary sheets eventually faulted and tilted upward. Subsequent erosion wore away the weaker sedimentary layers a faster rate than the basalt layers, leaving the abruptly tilted edges of the basalt sheets exposed, creating the distinct linear ridge and dramatic cliff faces visible today. One way to imagine this is to picture a layer cake tilted slightly up with some of the frosting (the sedimentary layer) removed in between. A good example of this layer-cake structure can be found on the Robert Frost Trail beneath Mount Norwottuck at the Horse Caves. The summit of Norwottuck is made of basalt; directly beneath the summit are the Horse Caves, a deep overhang where the weaker sedimentary layer has worn away at a more rapid rate that the basalt layer above it. Mount Toby is also part of such a geologic layer cake. The bottom layer is composed of arkose sandstone, visible across the Connecticut River on Sugarloaf Mountain in Deerfield, Massachusetts. The middle layer is composed basalt; it is most visible as the geology of the Pocumtuck Ridge, to the northwest of Mount Toby. The top (youngest) layer is composed of Mount Toby Conglomerate.

Both Mount Toby and the Holyoke Range are considered among the most biodiverse areas in New England. The trap rock Holyoke Range hosts a combination of microclimates including dry oak savannas, moist ravines dense with eastern hemlock and cooler climate plant species, and talus slopes, rich in nutrients, support a number of calcium-loving plants uncommon in Massachusetts. Fern and orchid species are particularly prolific on Mount Toby; forty-two of forty-five possible native fern species grow there as do rare orchids such as the showy lady slipper and the ram's head lady slipper.

The Holyoke Range is also an important seasonal raptor migration path.

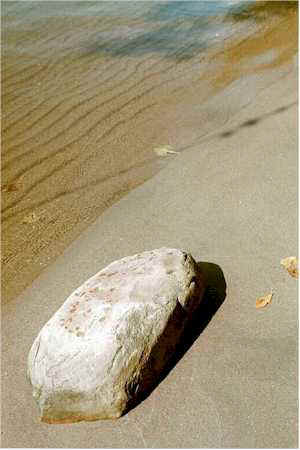
On the shore of the Connecticut River

=== The eastern uplands ===
Mount Orient and the section of the Robert Frost Trail north of Mount Toby, from Stoddard Hill to Ruggles Pond, belong to an upland plateau composed of 400 million year old metamorphic rock, mostly schist, gneiss and quartzite. The plateau, averaging 1,000 feet (300 m) above sea level, is geologically related to the higher White Mountains of New Hampshire, farther to the north. The terrain is rugged with many woodland ledges and ravines.

The uplands support transitional forests of species common to both the oak-hickory and northern hardwood forest types. Ravines support significant stands of eastern hemlock. Tree and shrub species also include sugar maple; red maple; gray, black, paper, and yellow birch; white ash; black oak and red oak; striped maple and mountain laurel.

=== River valley and floodplain ===
A third of the Robert Frost Trail is located within the bottomlands of the Connecticut River Valley, a relatively flat landscape with occasional rounded hills. The underlying strata is sedimentary rock, and the area has a long history of successful agriculture dating back to pre-colonial times. Soils are rich enough to support a commercial tobacco crop. The area is characterized by wetlands, meandering brooks with deeply cut banks, agricultural land, and patches of northern riverine forest and red maple swamp. Tree species include willow, American elm, and sycamore. The Connecticut River is 1,300 feet (396 m) from bank to bank at the southern terminus of the Robert Frost Trail and is navigable by power boat. Seasonal spring flooding replenishes the nutrients in the surrounding agricultural land.

== Recreation ==
The Robert Frost Trail, blazed with orange rectangles, is considered easy hiking with occasional rugged sections. It is open to hiking, snowshoeing, picnicking, and other passive activities. Swimming and fishing are possible at a number of locations. Hunting is permitted in some areas, in season. Much of the trail is also suitable for cross country skiing or backcountry skiing, and some sections are open to mountain biking and horseback riding.

Potential trail-use hazards include poison ivy and deer ticks (which are known to carry Lyme disease). Poisonous snakes are considered extremely rare or extinct along the Robert Frost Trail. Although the trail environs are black bear habitat, problem encounters with bears are rare.

Guides, maps, and trail descriptions are available from a variety of sources, most notably the town of Amherst Conservation Department, and the Appalachian Mountain Club. Publications are available for purchase at the Amherst town hall and at local bookstores and hiking outfitters. However, most trail maps are out of date. Published in 2004, the official trail guide only mentions the west Holyoke range section of the trail to be in development. Other online resources acknowledge that the trail guide is out of date, but fail to provide updated information on this new section.

== Conservation ==
A patchwork of state land, town land, and privately owned land, the Robert Frost Trail is managed and maintained by a local cooperative effort. Partners include town governments, private landowners, the Massachusetts Department of Conservation and Recreation, the Five Colleges, and several conservation non-profit organizations.

== See also ==
- The famous poet Robert Frost has several other trails named after him, including a nature trail in Ripton, Vermont (in the Green Mountains).
- Metacomet-Monadnock Trail
- Metacomet Ridge
