= Mount Holyoke =

Mountain in Massachusetts, United States

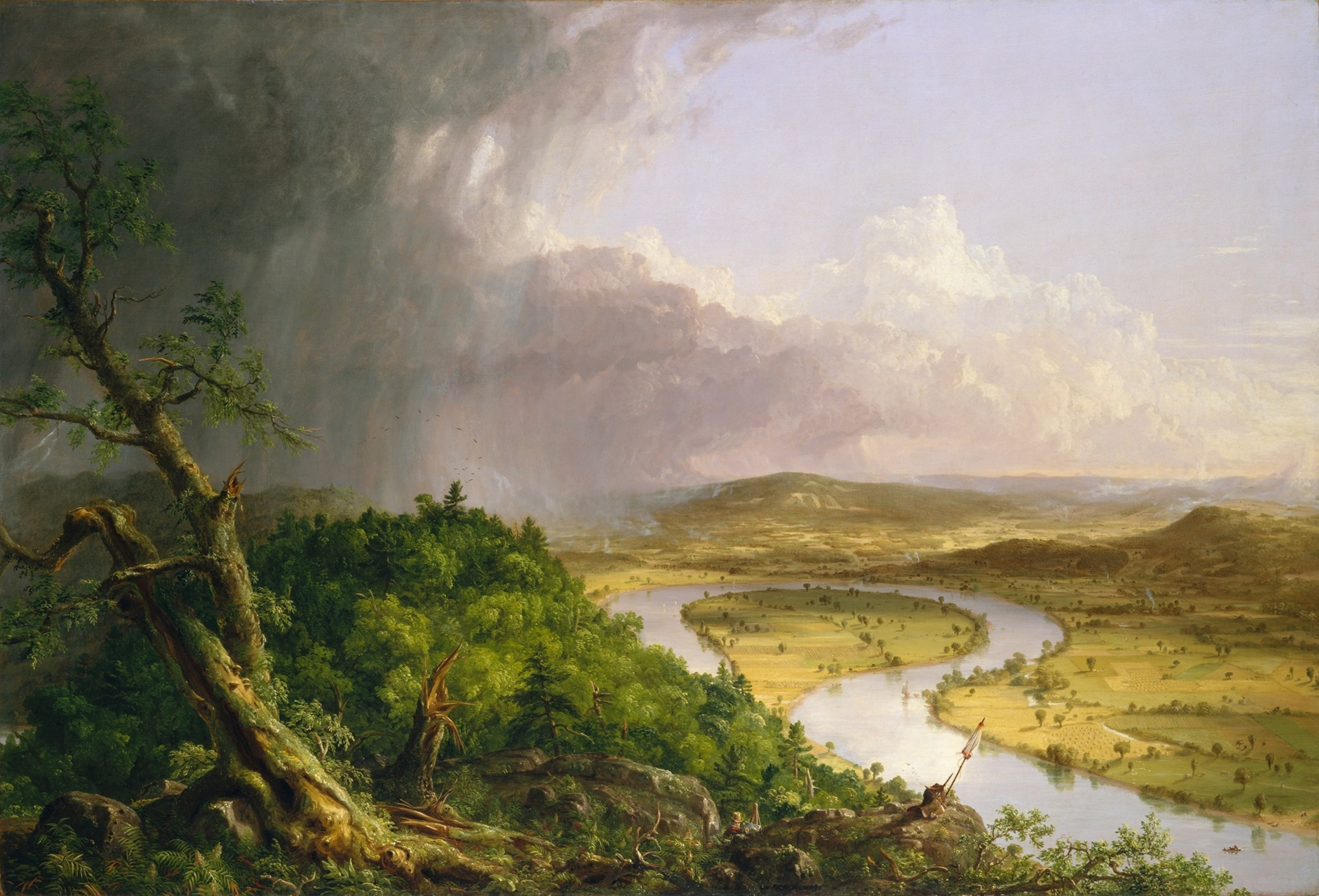
- View of the Connecticut River Oxbow from Mount Holyoke summit. 1836 painting by Thomas Cole.

Highest point
- Elevation: 935 ft (285 m)
- Coordinates: 42°18′03″N 72°35′13″W

Geography
- Location: Hadley and South Hadley, Massachusetts
- Parent range: Holyoke Range / Metacomet Ridge

Geology
- Rock age: 200 million years
- Mountain type(s): Fault-block; igneous

Climbing
- Easiest route: Auto road

Mount Holyoke, a traprock mountain, elevation 935 feet (285 m), is the westernmost peak of the Holyoke Range and part of the 100-mile (160 km) Metacomet Ridge. The mountain is located in the Connecticut River Valley of western Massachusetts, and is the namesake of nearby Mount Holyoke College. The mountain is located in the towns of Hadley and South Hadley, Massachusetts. It is known for its historic summit house, auto road, scenic vistas, and biodiversity. The mountain is crossed by the 110-mile (180 km) Metacomet-Monadnock Trail and numerous shorter trails. Mount Holyoke is the home of J.A. Skinner State Park which is accessible from Route 47 in Hadley, Massachusetts.

== History ==
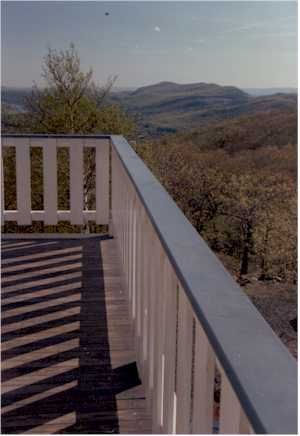
View from Mount Holyoke Summit House

=== Origin of name ===
The mountain was named after Elizur Holyoke, an early resident of Springfield, Massachusetts and immigrant from Tamworth, England, who was the first European to explore the mountainous region that came to bear his name. The city of Holyoke, Massachusetts, the Holyoke Range, and the Mount Holyoke Female Seminary (now Mount Holyoke College) were all named after this mountain, Mount Holyoke, and not directly after Elizur Holyoke. However, Elizur Holyoke's name is still invoked in many references to the mountain.

=== The Mount Holyoke Summit House ===
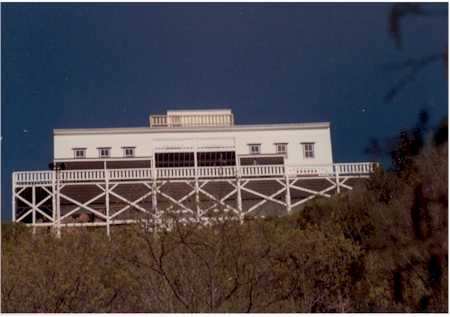
Mount Holyoke Summit House

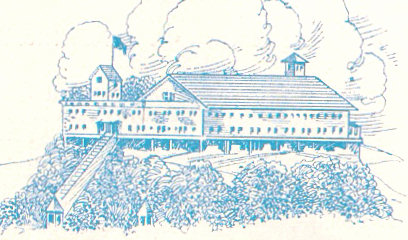
Mt Holyoke Hotel, showing summit house and covered electric tram circa 1931

In 1821, an 18-by-24-foot (5.5 by 7.3 m) guest cabin was built on Mount Holyoke by a local committee—one of the first New England summit houses. The property changed hands several times between 1821 and 1851 when it was bought and rebuilt as a two-story, eight-room hotel. Local entrepreneurs John and Frances French were the primary owners; between 1851 and 1900, the hotel and property were subject to a number of upgrades and related construction projects including a covered tramway to the summit of the mountain (first drawn by horse, then mechanized), a railroad from the base of the mountain to a steamboat dock on the Connecticut River, and the construction of a number of outbuildings and trails. With passenger steamship to the connecting summit railway established, the Mount Holyoke "Prospect House" became a popular tourist destination. The steamship would pick up guests at the Smiths Ferry railroad station across the Connecticut River in what was then Northampton, ferry them to a tramway leading to the Half Way House. From there guests could take a steep (600 feet long, rising 365 feet) covered inclined tram to the summit (shown in drawing at right). The track for this tram was first laid in 1867 and the system electrified in 1926. Competing establishments were soon built on Mount Tom and Mount Nonotuck across the Connecticut River, and on Sugarloaf Mountain and Mount Toby to the north. The Prospect House property passed hands again in the early 1900s, to chain hotelier Joseph Allen Skinner, who eventually donated the hotel and property to the Commonwealth of Massachusetts for a state park in 1939 on the condition that the park be named after him (now the J.A. Skinner State Park).

The summit house's 1894 annex had suffered from storm damage during the Great Hurricane of 1938 and had been demolished; in 1942 the enclosed tramway to the summit house broke down. A heavy snow storm in 1948 collapsed sections of the roof. Despite proposals to repair the tram it never ran again. The tram was finally demolished in 1965. State funds for maintenance of the summit house during the 1950s and 1960s were never adequate and by the mid-1970s there were proposals to condemn and demolish the summit house. This led to a public outcry and in the mid-1980s the summit house, consisting of the original 1851 structure and the 1861 addition, was restored by the state and through the efforts of local volunteers.

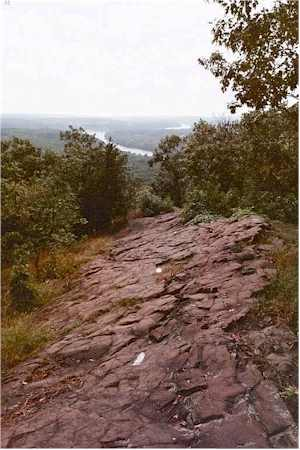
View from Mount Holyoke south ledges along the Metacomet-Monadnock Trail. Connecticut River in background

== Geology and ecology ==
Mount Holyoke, like much of the Metacomet Ridge, is composed of basalt, also called trap rock, a volcanic rock. The mountain formed near the end of the Triassic Period with the rifting apart of the North American continent from Africa and Eurasia. Lava welled up from the rift and solidified into sheets of strata hundreds of feet thick. Subsequent faulting and earthquake activity tilted the strata, creating the dramatic cliffs and ridges of Mount Holyoke. Hot, dry upper slopes, cool, moist ravines, and mineral-rich ledges of basalt talus produce a combination of microclimate ecosystems on the mountain that support plant and animal species uncommon in greater Massachusetts. (The Metacomet Ridge article has more information on the geology and ecosystem of Mount Holyoke).

== Recreation ==
The summit automobile road is open for driving from April through November, and the hiking trails year-round. The Summit House is open weekends and holidays from Memorial Day through Columbus Day. A number of hiking trails also cross the mountain, most notably the 110 mile (180k) Metacomet-Monadnock Trail and the 47-mile (76 km) Robert Frost Trail.

Every year in early fall, since 1838, students from nearby Mount Holyoke College participate in Mountain Day. On that day, at the sound of ringing bells from Abbey Chapel on a random Autumn morning, all classes are cancelled and students hike to the summit of Mount Holyoke.

The area around the summit house has many picnic tables. Also, there are trailheads and memorials. One notable memorial is that to the men aboard a military plane that crashed into the flank of the mountain. On May 27, 1944, a B-24 Liberator, flying a night training mission out of Westover Air Force Base in Chicopee, Massachusetts, crashed into a cliff on the side of the range, killing all ten crewmen. A memorial plaque on the summit of Mount Holyoke, installed in May 1989, eulogizes the disaster. The crash site itself is one-half mile (0.80 km) away, toward the southwest.

The views from the top of the mountain are some of the best in Massachusetts. They have inspired artists and poets. The nearby Connecticut River Oxbow (now a lake), immortalized by the famous landscape painter Thomas Cole just four years before natural flooding and erosion separated it from the Connecticut River, was composed from sketches the artist made from the summit of Mount Holyoke in 1836. To the south are the cities of Holyoke, Springfield, and Hartford. To the north are the University of Massachusetts in Amherst and mountains in Sunderland. To the east is the Holyoke Range and the town of South Hadley. To the west are the foothills of the Berkshires, the Connecticut River, and Northampton.

== Conservation ==
Most of Mount Holyoke is located within the Skinner State Park. The Mount Holyoke Range State Park is a sister park occupying the east side of the Holyoke Range. Its visitor center is located at "the Notch", where Route 116 crosses the range in Amherst.

In 2000, Mount Holyoke was included in a study by the National Park Service for the designation of a new National Scenic Trail now tentatively called the New England National Scenic Trail, which would include the Metacomet-Monadnock Trail in Massachusetts and the Mattabesett Trail and Metacomet Trail trails in Connecticut.

== See also ==
- Metacomet Ridge
- Metacomet-Monadnock Trail
- Robert Frost Trail (Massachusetts)
- Adjacent summits:

< West

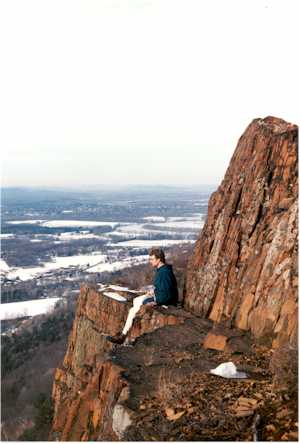
Mount Tom Range

East >
Seven Sisters
(no image)

== Cultural references ==
- Mount Holyoke is mentioned in Henry James's 1875 novel Roderick Hudson, in chapters II and IX.
