= J. A. Skinner State Park =

Public recreation area in Massachusetts

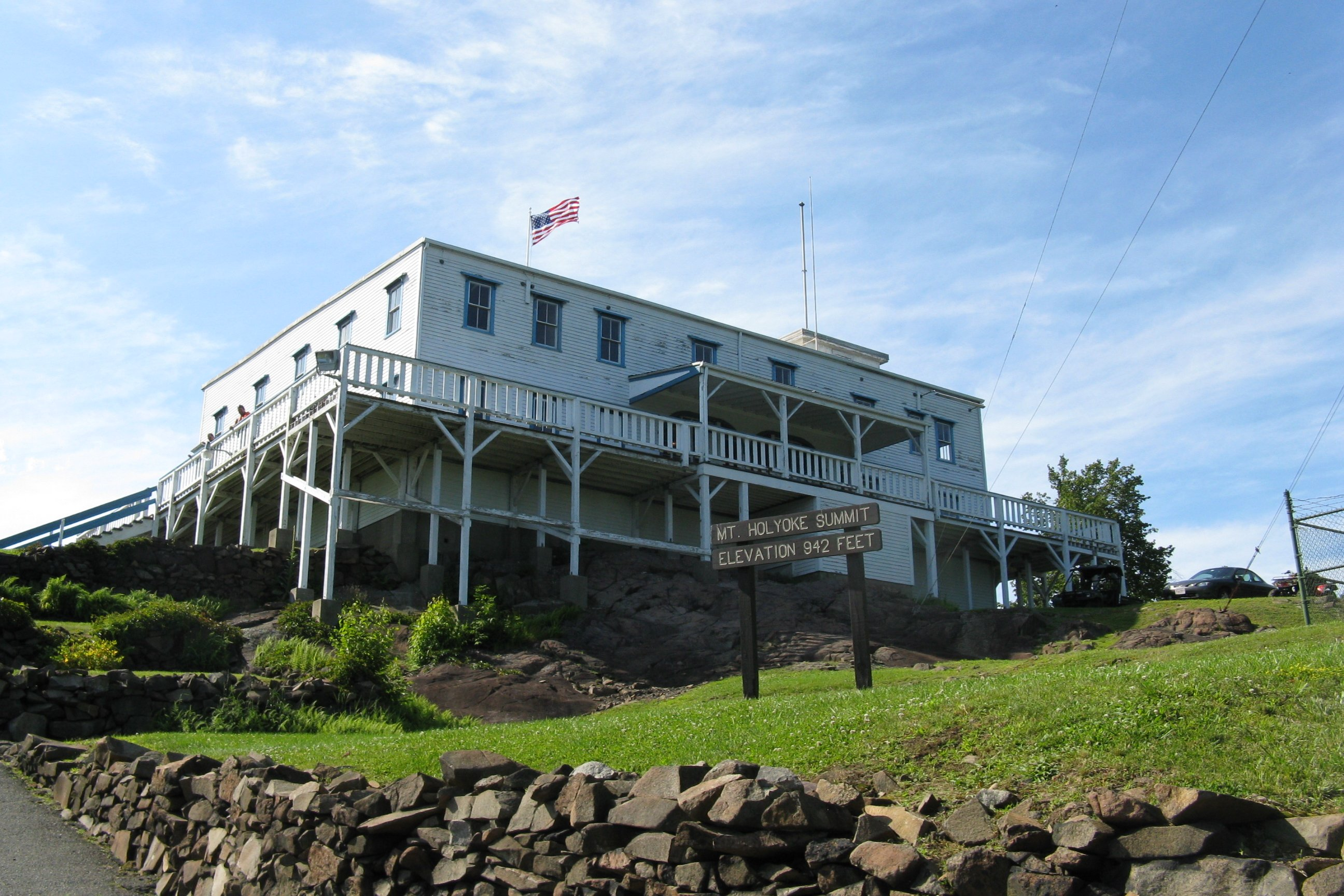
- The Summit House

- Location within Massachusetts Location within the United States
- Location: Hadley and South Hadley, Massachusetts, United States
- Coordinates: 42°18′03″N 72°35′12″W
- Area: 843 acres (341 ha)
- Elevation: 932 ft (284 m)
- Established: 1940
- Administrator: Massachusetts Department of Conservation and Recreation
- Website: Official website

Joseph Allen Skinner State Park is a public recreation area located in the towns of Hadley and South Hadley in the Connecticut River Valley of western Massachusetts. The state park surrounds Mount Holyoke, the westernmost peak of the Mount Holyoke Range. At the summit is the historic Prospect House, a hotel opened in 1851. The park is managed by the Massachusetts Department of Conservation and Recreation.

== History ==
In its prime, a steamer would pick up guests at the Smiths Ferry railroad station across the Connecticut River in what was then Northampton, ferrying them to a tramway leading to the Half Way House. From there guests could take a steep inclined tram to the summit. The Prospect House, under the proprietorship of John and Fanny French, was expanded twice, first in 1861 and nearly doubled in size with the construction of an annex in 1894.

In 1908 the property was sold to the Mt. Holyoke Hotel Company. This corporation was formed by Joseph Skinner, a local industrialist, L. Treadway of Treadway Inn fame, and Christopher Clarke to hold the land in trust for an eventual state reservation. The hotel continued operation until the Great Hurricane of 1938 badly damaged the 1894 annex, which was subsequently demolished. Soon after this, Joseph Allan Skinner offered to donate the hotel and the surrounding land to the Commonwealth of Massachusetts on the condition it would become a state park bearing his name. The formal dedication was held in June 1940.

State funds for maintenance of the summit house and tramway during the intervening years were inadequate. The remains of the tramway were removed in 1964 and by the mid-1970s there were proposals to condemn and demolish the summit house. This led to a public outcry and in the mid-1980s the Summit House, consisting of the original 1851 structure and the 1861 addition, was restored by the state. The building was reopened for tours following restoration work performed in 2014.

== Activities and amenities ==
The park offers scenic views, picnicking, and over 40 miles (64 km) of trails including an 11-mile (18 km) stretch of the Metacomet-Monadnock Trail. It is accessible from Rt 47 in Hadley. The Summit House offers summertime concerts sponsored by the Friends of the Mt. Holyoke Range.

== See also ==
- Hockanum Rural Historic District, a National Register district which includes the Hadley portion of the park
