= Metacomet-Monadnock Trail =

Hiking trail in United States

Coordinates: 42.55°N 72.45°W

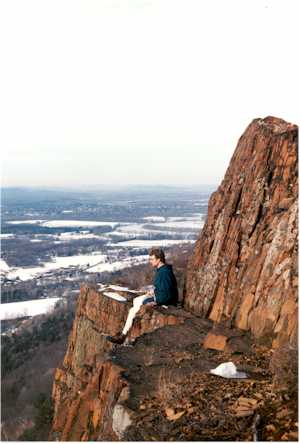
- Trap rock cliffs along the M&M Trail on the Mount Tom Range
- Length: 110 mi (180 km)
- Location: Massachusetts and New Hampshire
- Designation: Massachusetts section is part of the New England National Scenic Trail
- Use: hiking, snowshoeing, other
- Highest point: Mount Monadnock, 3,165 ft (965 m)
- Lowest point: Connecticut River, 89 ft (27 m)
- Difficulty: easy, with difficult sections
- Season: easiest spring to fall
- Hazards: deer ticks, weather, poison ivy

The Metacomet-Monadnock Trail (M&M Trail) is a 114-mile-long (183 km) hiking trail that traverses the Metacomet Ridge of the Pioneer Valley region of Massachusetts and the central uplands of Massachusetts and southern New Hampshire. Although less than 70 miles (110 km) from Boston and other large population centers, the trail is considered remarkably rural and scenic and includes many areas of unique ecologic, historic, and geologic interest. Notable features include waterfalls, dramatic cliff faces, exposed mountain summits, woodlands, swamps, lakes, river floodplain, farmland, significant historic sites, and the summits of Mount Monadnock, Mount Tom and Mount Holyoke. The Metacomet-Monadnock Trail is maintained largely through the efforts of the Western Massachusetts Chapter of the Appalachian Mountain Club (AMC). Much of the trail (but not all) is a portion of the New England National Scenic Trail.

== Trail description ==
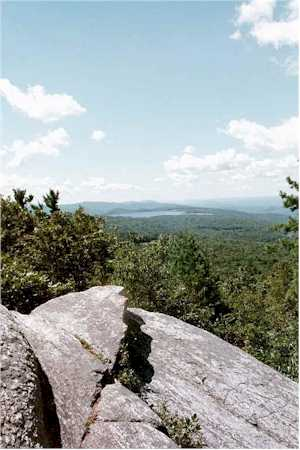
Crag Mountain, a quartzite peak on the M&M Trail in Northfield, Massachusetts. Northfield Reservoir visible in the background. As of the summer 2013 Crag Mountain is no longer part of the M&M trail that has been rerouted to the road. (see photograph below)

The Metacomet-Monadnock Trail extends from the Connecticut/ Massachusetts border through Hampden, Hampshire, Franklin, and northwestern Worcester counties in Massachusetts, and Cheshire County in New Hampshire. The southern terminus of the trail is located in southeast Southwick, Massachusetts, at Rising Corner Road and is identified with a kiosk. Geographically it begins near the gap between West Suffield Mountain and Provin Mountain, southwest of the city of Springfield; the northern terminus is located on the summit of Mount Monadnock in southern New Hampshire. The Metacomet Trail in Connecticut and the Monadnock-Sunapee Greenway Trail in New Hampshire continue where the Metacomet-Monadnock Trail leaves off. These trails extend the overall hiking possibilities another 101 miles (163 km) to the south (along the Metacomet Trail and its logical extension, the Mattabesett Trail), and 50 miles (80 km) farther north into central New Hampshire.

Other long hiking trails that intersect the M&M Trail include the 47-mile (76 km) Robert Frost Trail (Massachusetts) in the Pioneer Valley region, and the 22-mile (35 km) Tully Trail in the Royalston area. Significant networks of shorter hiking trails intersect the M&M trail, most notably on the Holyoke and Mount Tom ranges, in Wendell and Erving State Forests, on Northfield Mountain, and on Mount Monadnock.

The M&M trail is primarily used for hiking, backpacking, and in the winter, snowshoeing. Portions of the trail are suitable for, and are used for, trail running, mountain biking, and cross-country skiing. Site specific activities enjoyed along the route include hunting, fishing, horseback riding, boating (on the Connecticut River), bouldering, rock climbing, and swimming.

=== Southern section ===
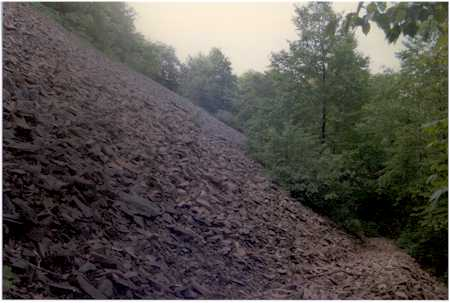
Talus slopes along the M&M Trail on Bare Mountain

The southernmost 40 miles (64 km) of the M&M Trail traverse a northern section of the trap rock Metacomet Ridge which extends from Long Island Sound to the Massachusetts/ Vermont border. This ridge, rising hundreds of feet above the Connecticut River Valley in Massachusetts, is a prominent landscape feature. Mount Tom, at 1,202 feet (366 m) above sea level and with vertical cliff faces of several hundred feet, is the high point. From south to north, the M&M Trail uses the ridges of Provin Mountain, East Mountain, the Mount Tom Range, and the Holyoke Range. Abrupt vertical cliffs with visible talus slopes and frequent viewpoints are common throughout. Views are generally to the west on Provin Mountain, East Mountain, and the Mount Tom ranges; and to the north on the Holyoke Range. The Connecticut River cuts through the ridgeline between the Mount Tom and Holyoke ranges in Holyoke, Massachusetts, and the Westfield River separates Provin Mountain from East Mountain in Westfield. Historic features along the trail include the Horse Caves on Mount Norwottuck, the ruins of the 19th-century hotel Eyrie House on Mount Nonotuck, and the refurbished Mount Holyoke Summit House on Mount Holyoke. The Mount Holyoke Summit House has been restored as a museum, open during weekends in the summer. The trap rock ridges and talus slopes are also home to several unique microclimate ecosystems that support species of plants that are unusual or endangered in this part of New England, and are a seasonal migration path for raptors. Viewsheds from the ledges include agrarian land, suburbs, small towns, river corridors, the eastern Berkshires ridgeline, metropolitan Springfield, and the skyline of the University of Massachusetts Amherst.

=== Northern section ===
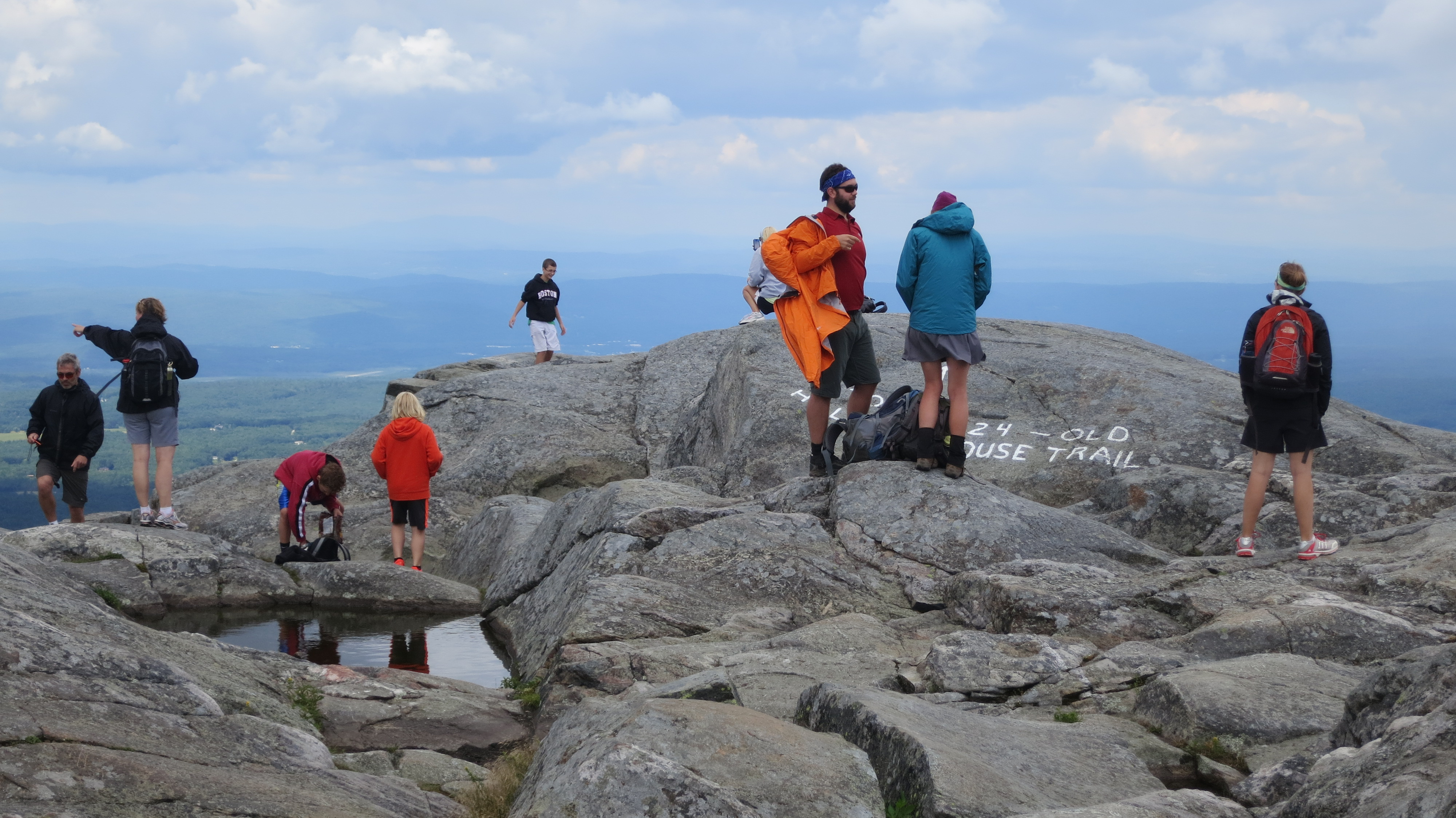
Summit view of Grand Monadnock on a July weekend. More than 125,000 people hike this peak each year, making it the most frequently climbed mountain in the United States.

Where open to public access, the remaining 66 miles (106 km) of trail follows an elevated plateau of 400 million year old metamorphic rock punctuated by occasional monadnocks. The terrain is a rural and largely wooded, post-glacial landscape with sparse viewpoints, deep ravines, and a few bare mountain summits. The trail follows the western edge of this plateau in a northerly direction, then jogs east along the Massachusetts/New Hampshire border before turning north again to reach Mount Monadnock. Prominent features on or easily accessible from this part of the M&M Trail include, from south to north, Rattlesnake Gutter (a boulder-filled chasm), Ruggles Pond in Wendell State Forest, the Millers River, Farley Ledges, Briggs Brook Falls, Northfield Mountain and reservoir (a hydroelectric reservoir carved out of a mountain top), the historic Hermit Cave, Crag Mountain, Mount Grace, Highland Falls, and Royalston Falls. In New Hampshire, the trail crosses the summits of Little Monadnock Mountain (in Rhododendron State Park), Gap Mountain, and Mount Monadnock. All three of these peaks have exposed summit ledges. Mount Monadnock is the most prominent peak of southeast New England. At 3,165 feet (965 m) high, it is 1,000 feet (300 m) higher than any mountain peak within 30 miles (48 km) and rises 2,000 feet (610 m) above the surrounding landscape. Its bare, rocky summit provides expansive views.

=== Trail communities ===
The M&M Trail passes through land located within the following incorporated towns. In Massachusetts (from south to north): Southwick, Agawam, Westfield, West Springfield, Holyoke, Easthampton, Hadley, South Hadley, Amherst, Granby, Belchertown, Pelham, Shutesbury, Leverett, Wendell, Erving, Northfield, Warwick, Royalston; and in New Hampshire: Richmond, Fitzwilliam, Troy, and Jaffrey.

== History ==
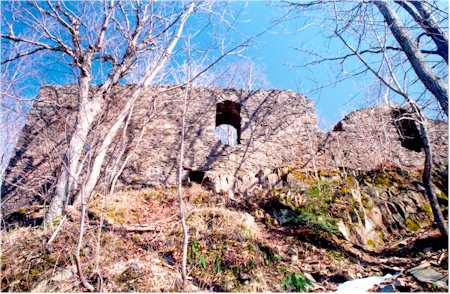
Eyrie House ruins on the summit of Mount Nonotuck of the Mount Tom Range

The Metacomet-Monadnock Trail receives its name from the Metacomet Trail in Connecticut, of which it is a logical extension, and from Mount Monadnock in New Hampshire. The name Metacomet is derived from Metacom, the 17th-century Native American leader and son of Massasoit of the Wampanoag tribe of southern New England. The term Monadnock is an Abenaki-derived word used to describe a mountain. It has come to be used by American geologists to describe any isolated mountain formed from the exposure of a harder rock as a result of the erosion of a softer rock that once surrounded it.

The M&M Trail was designed in the 1950s by the late Professor Walter M. Banfield of the University of Massachusetts Amherst as an extension of the 50-mile (80 km) Metacomet Trail in Connecticut. The route was constructed utilizing newly blazed paths, abandoned farm roads, and existing hiking trails (many of them several hundred years old) where available. Portions of the route on Mount Monadnock and the Holyoke and Mount Tom ranges date back as far as the 18th century. Early trail-building was supported by various summit resort hotels popular in the 19th century. Such resorts once stood on Mount Holyoke, Mount Nonotuck, Mount Tom, and Mount Monadnock (at the Halfway House site). Most of them had burned down or had become defunct by the early 20th century and never recovered. Encroaching development and modern transportation hastened the demise of these businesses by shifting tourism to more remote and exotic locations. Many of these properties were eventually bought, taken, or donated for inclusion in various state parks.

The terminus of the trail, Mount Monadnock, barren from 2,000 feet (610 m) to its 3,165 feet (965 m) summit and known for its fine views and rugged topography, was once mostly wooded. Fires deliberately set in the early 19th century by nearby farmers concerned with wolves denning in blowdown snags resulted in the denudation of the mountain. The fires burned so hot that the soil was destroyed and subsequently washed away. Since then, the summit has recovered to the degree that it appears natural and scenic, although it is still very barren and reminiscent of the alpine peaks of the White Mountains to the north. Vegetation has begun to slowly reclaim some of the ledges and ravines, but the process of soil generation on windy slopes will likely take many hundreds of years.

As described in #Conservation and maintenance of the trail corridor below, the M&M Trail is part of the New England National Scenic Trail.

== Landscape, geology, and natural environment ==
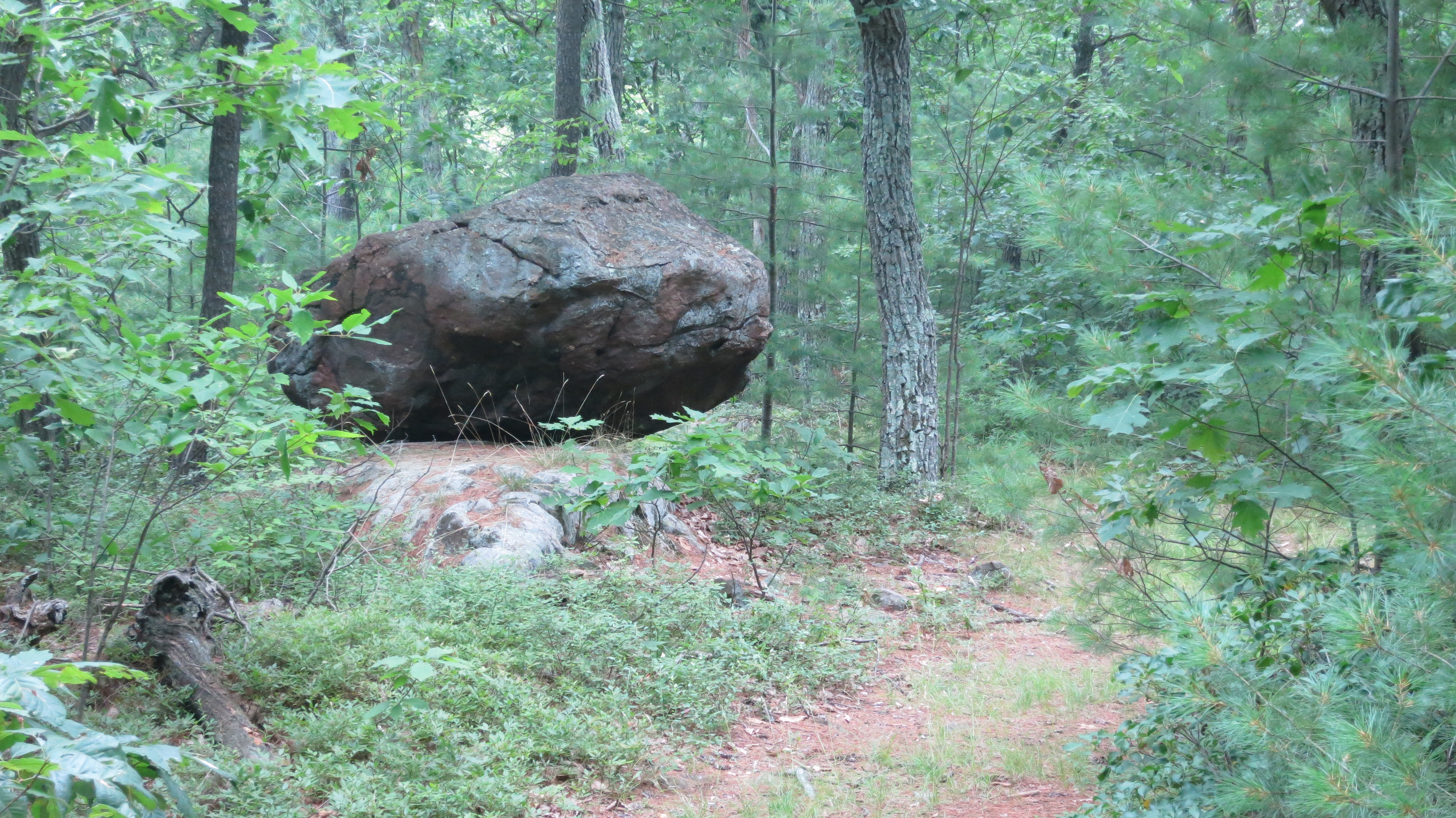
This glacial erratic is located on the M&M trail about one mile north of Mass State Highway 141.

The geology and natural environment of the M&M trail can be divided into two distinct sections: the Metacomet Ridge of the Pioneer Valley and the upland plateau of central Massachusetts and southern New Hampshire. One common denominator, evidence of recent glacial activity, can be found throughout all parts of the M&M Trail. Such evidence includes glacial erratics, glacial scouring, glacial striations, deranged drainage, mountain notches, U-shaped valleys, highland swamps, and roches moutonnées, so called "sheepback mountains" because they often resemble the shape of a sheep in profile. The extremely steep south and/or east faces of these hills were carved by the movement of glacial ice down lee slopes.

=== The Metacomet Ridge ===
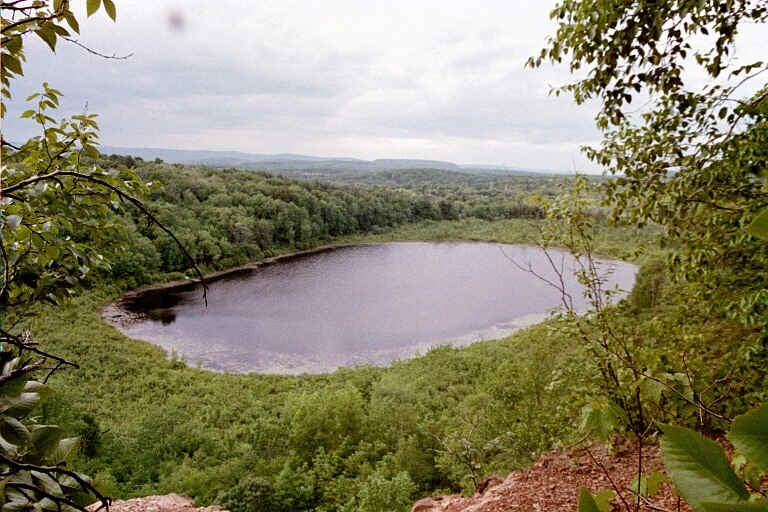
Snake Pond, a kettle pond along the M&M Trail on trap rock East Mountain

The ridge that forms the spine of the M&M Trail across Provin Mountain, East Mountain, and the Mount Tom and Holyoke ranges was formed 200 million years ago during the late Triassic and early Jurassic periods and is composed of trap rock, also known as basalt, an extrusive volcanic rock. Basalt is a dark colored rock, but the iron within it weathers to a rusty brown when exposed to the air, lending the ledges a distinct reddish appearance. Basalt frequently breaks into octagonal and pentagonal columns, creating a unique "postpile" appearance. Huge slopes made of fractured basalt talus are visible beneath many of the ledges; they are particularly visible along the Metacomet-Monadnock Trail on Bare Mountain. The basalt ridges are the product of several massive lava flows hundreds of feet deep that welled up in faults created by the rifting apart of North America from Eurasia and Africa. These basalt floods of lava happened over a period of 20 million years. Erosion occurring between the eruptions deposited deep layers of sediment between the lava flows, which eventually lithified into sedimentary rock. The resulting "layer cake" of basalt and sedimentary sheets eventually faulted and tilted upward. Subsequent erosion wore away the weaker sedimentary layers a faster rate than the basalt layers, leaving the abruptly tilted edges of the basalt sheets exposed, creating the distinct linear ridge and dramatic cliff faces visible today. One way to imagine this is to picture a layer cake tilted slightly up with some of the frosting (the sedimentary layer) removed in between. One of the best places to view this layer-cake structure is just beneath the summit of Mount Norwottuck. The summit of Norwottuck is made of basalt; directly beneath the summit are the Horse Caves, a deep overhang where the weaker sedimentary layer has worn away at a more rapid rate than the basalt layer above it. The Horse Caves are located a short distance off the M&M Trail via the Robert Frost Trail. The sedimentary rock of the Connecticut River Valley is also well known for its fossils, especially dinosaur tracks, which have been discovered in several locations near the ridges that the M&M Trail traverses.

The Metacomet Ridge hosts a combination of microclimates unusual in New England. Dry, hot upper ridges support oak savannas, often dominated by chestnut oak and a variety of understory grasses and ferns. Eastern red cedar, a dry-loving species, clings to the barren edges of cliffs. Backslope plant communities tend to be more similar to the adjacent Berkshire plateau containing species common to the northern hardwood and oak-hickory forest forest types. Eastern hemlock crowds narrow ravines, blocking sunlight and creating damp, cooler growing conditions with associated cooler climate plant species. Talus slopes are especially rich in nutrients and support a number of calcium-loving plants uncommon in Massachusetts. Many bogs, ponds, and reservoirs lie cupped between trap rock ridge shelves, demonstrating the value of these ridges as important aquifers and wetland ecosystem habitats. Because the trap rock ridges generate such varied terrain, they are the home of several plant and animal species that are state-listed or globally rare.

Other ecosystems on the southern sections of the M&M Trail include the northern riverine community which supports species such as willow, American elm, and sycamore; this ecosystem can be found along the Westfield and Connecticut rivers.

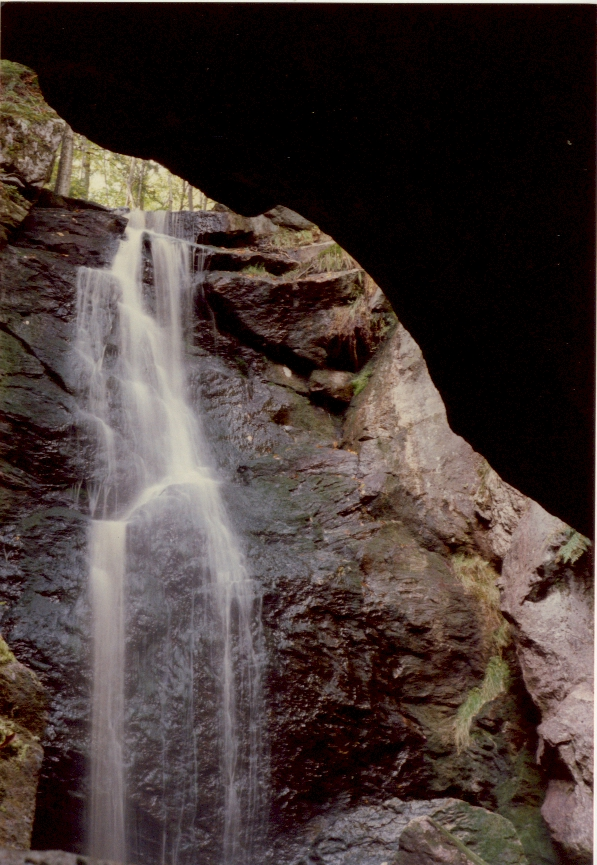
Royalston Falls, on the M&M Trail near the New Hampshire border

=== The upland plateau ===
North of the Holyoke Range, the M&M Trail traverses an upland plateau composed of much older metamorphic rock, mostly schist, gneiss and quartzite. The plateau, averaging 1,000 feet (300 m) above sea level, is geologically related to the higher White Mountains of New Hampshire, farther to the north. The terrain is rugged, with deep ravines and isolated mountain peaks called monadnocks. Notable monadnocks along the M&M Trail include Mount Grace and Mount Monadnock. Other mountains on this section of the M&M Trail, including Mt. Lincoln, Mt. Orient, and Northfield Mountain, represent high points on the steeply ravined edges of a dissected plateau.

The upland plateau section of the M&M Trail supports transitional forests of species common to both the oak-hickory and northern hardwood forest types. Ravines support significant stands of eastern hemlock, and stands of white pine are common throughout. Tree and shrub species also include sugar maple; red maple; gray, black, paper, and yellow birch; white ash; black oak and red oak; striped maple; mountain laurel; and, on exposed dry ledges, pitch pine. Northern boreal species, particularly red spruce, become apparent on peaks in the northern part of the M&M Trail. The high, exposed ledges of Mount Monadnock support several alpine and sub-alpine species of plants, including mountain ash, cotton grass, sheep laurel, mountain sandwort, and the mountain cranberry. Krummholz, trees stunted by harsh weather, are found on Mount Monadnock, as are several alpine bogs. The northernmost stand of native rhododendron (growing naturally, not planted) in eastern North America is located just off the M&M Trail on Little Monadnock Mountain in Rhododendron State Park, New Hampshire.

== Hiking the trail ==
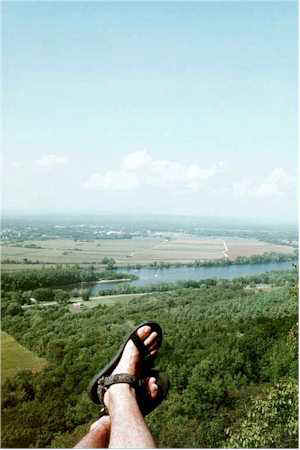
View from Mount Holyoke ledges

The trail is blazed with white rectangles. It is regularly maintained, and is considered easy hiking, with sections of rugged and moderately difficult hiking along the Holyoke and Mount Tom ranges. Mount Monadnock is regarded as a challenging hike for novice hikers during favorable weather conditions. Guidebooks recommend hikers take a map and compass. Hikers should contact the Berkshire Section of the AMC or review on-line updates for the latest trail relocations. As the crow flies, the M&M Trail route is never more than a mile or two from a public road; however, cliffs and steep terrain on the Metacomet Ridge and on Mount Monadnock and other peaks make access much more difficult in some areas. There are several primitive lean-tos and campsites, and a few state park campsites with facilities along the trail. However, camping is discouraged in many areas. Campfires are generally prohibited, except in established fire rings in state park campgrounds. Trail descriptions are available from a number of commercial and non-commercial sources, and a complete guidebook with topographic maps is published by the Appalachian Mountain Club.

Weather along the route is typical of Massachusetts and southern New Hampshire, with slightly warmer temperatures in the Connecticut River Valley versus the upland plateau to the east. Conditions on exposed hill tops and summits may be harsher during cold or stormy weather. Weather atop the exposed and isolated 3,100-foot (940 m) summit of Mount Monadnock can be much more severe than conditions below; high winds are common year round and winter storms on the summit can be life-threatening. Lightning is a hazard on exposed peaks and ledges during thunderstorms. High flooding is common during rainy periods on the portions of trail that dip into the Connecticut River Valley and the Westfield River Valley, sometimes obliterating the trail. The Westfield River can be forded only during dry periods, and even then not without risk. The Connecticut River is not fordable; the trail terminates where it meets it (one must walk or drive to the Northampton Route 9 bridge or arrange for boat passage to the opposite bank). Snow is common in the winter and may necessitate the use of cross country skis or snowshoes. Ice can form on exposed ledges and summits, making hiking dangerous without special equipment. Snow and ice tend to linger on Mount Monadnock well into the spring.

Biting insects can be bothersome during warm weather. Parasitic deer ticks (which are known to carry Lyme disease) are a hazard. The trail passes through black bear habitat (especially the northern portions), although problems with bears are rare. More likely are problematic encounters with feral and domestic dogs. Skunks, raccoons, and porcupines are common and active after dark. Venomous snakes are considered extinct along most of the route, with the possible exception of the warm, dry microclimates on the Metacomet Ridge. Poison ivy is native to the M&M Trail ecosystems, but it occurs with less frequency north of the Holyoke Range, and does not thrive on Mount Monadnock at all.

Many water sources along the trail flow through inhabited areas or swamps and may be contaminated. Except during the winter, trap rock ridges tend to be dry, leaving long stretches of trail with no dependable water source. Various portions along the trail are road walks due to private ownership; contacting the AMC will provide the latest updates. Hikers seeking 'on the ground', current information regarding the status of the M&M trail should read hiker journals available on the Internet, such as Trail Journals.com

== Conservation and maintenance of the trail corridor ==
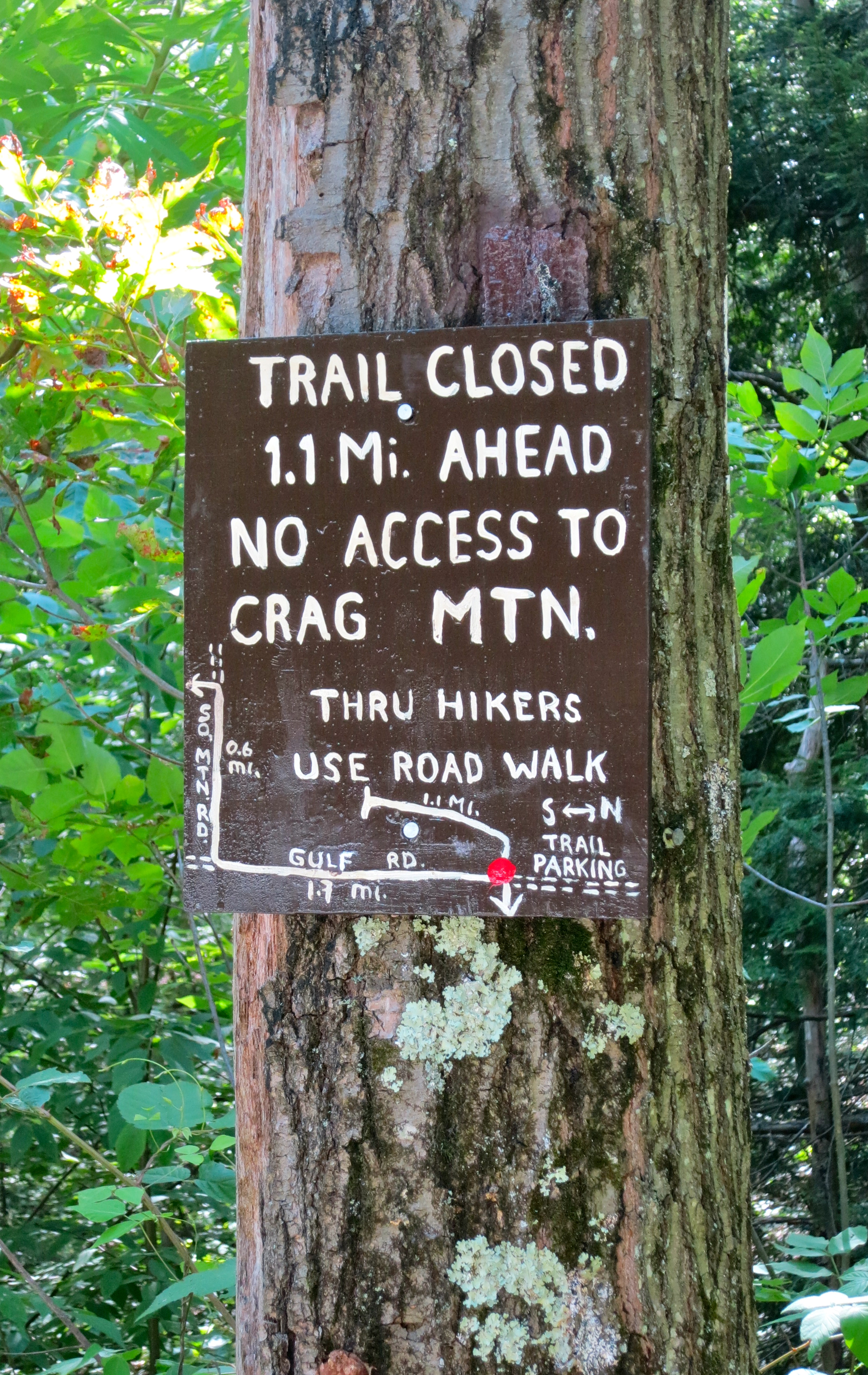
Trail closure sign with alternate route shown. A significant portion of the M&M Trail relies on the good will of owners of privately held land.

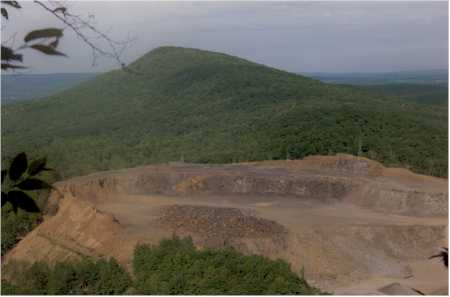
Obliteration of Round Mountain by quarrying. 1989 photo; significantly more rock has been removed since then.

The M&M Trail passes through public land (state parks, forests, and wildlife management areas), land managed by conservation non-profit organizations, private land under conservation easement, and unprotected private land via permission of individual land owners.

Significant threats to the trail, its ecosystems, and its viewshed included quarrying (especially on the trap rock ridges) and suburban sprawl.

The Metacomet-Monadnock Trail is maintained by volunteer efforts largely facilitated by the Berkshire Chapter of the Appalachian Mountain Club. Many groups are invested in preserving the pathway and viewshed of the Metacomet-Monadnock Trail, including The Trustees of Reservations, Mount Grace Land Conservation Trust, Friends of the Mt. Holyoke Range, the Society for the Protection of New Hampshire Forests, the Amherst Conservation Commission, the State of New Hampshire, and the Commonwealth of Massachusetts.

In 2000, the Metacomet-Monadnock Trail was included in a study by the National Park Service for inclusion in a new National Scenic Trail. This study, completed in 2006, is available on-line at the New England Scenic Trail website. It was designated in 2009 as part of the New England National Scenic Trail, which includes the Mattabesett and Metacomet trails in Connecticut. Some sections of the Metacomet-Monadnock Trail are also designated as a National Recreation Trail (not the same as a National Scenic Trail).

== See also ==
- Metacomet Ridge
- Metacomet Trail
- Monadnock-Sunapee Greenway
- Robert Frost Trail
- Tully Trail
