= Granby, Massachusetts =

Town in Massachusetts, United States

- Town
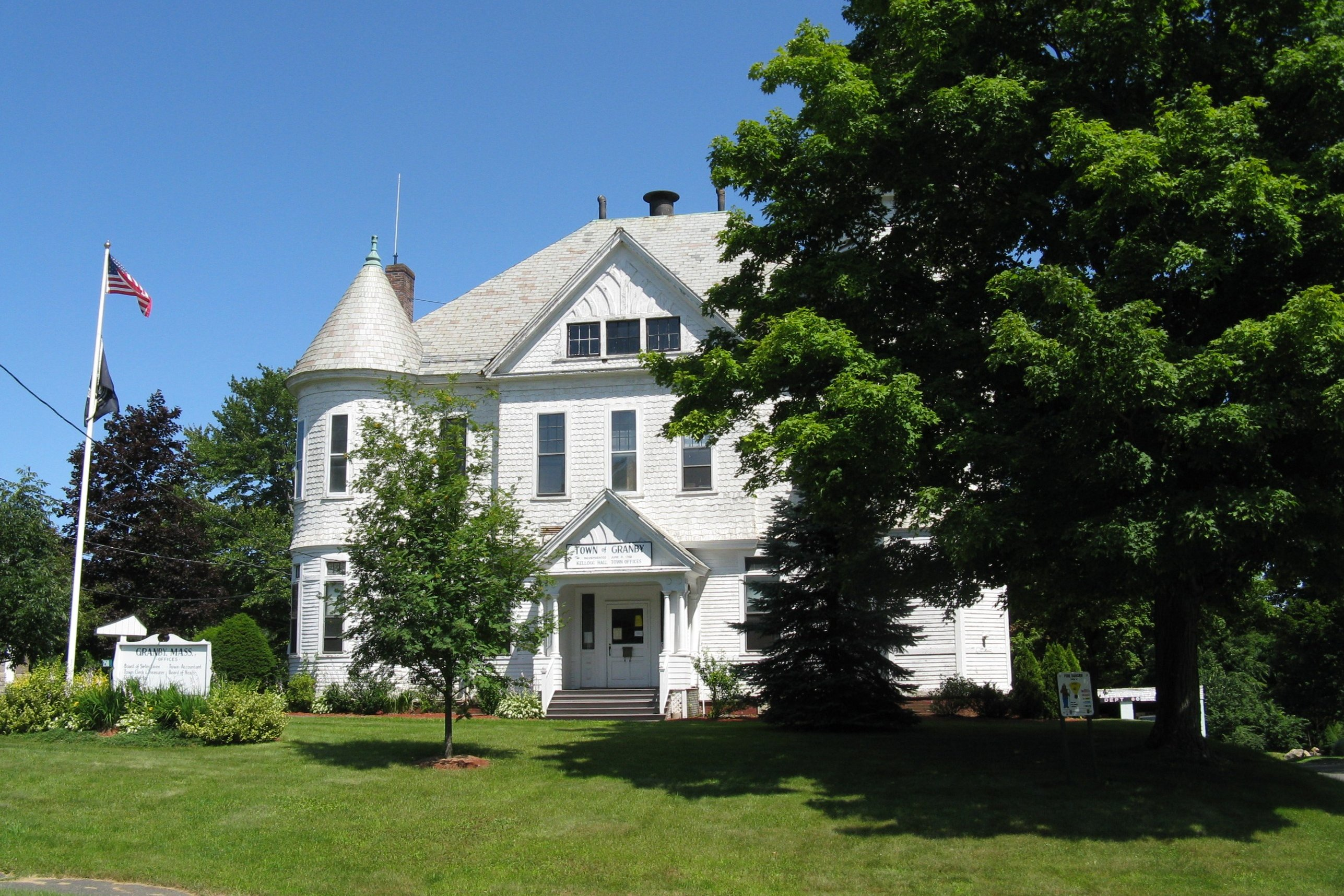
- Kellogg Hall

- Flag Seal

- Location in Hampshire County in Massachusetts
- Coordinates: 42°15′23″N 72°31′00″W
- Country: United States
- State: Massachusetts
- County: Hampshire
- Settled: 1727
- Incorporated: June 11, 1768
- Named for: John Manners, Marquess of Granby

Government
  - Type: Open Town Meeting
  - Town Administrator: Christopher Martin
  - Selectboard: Members: Crystal Dufresne; Glen N. Sexton; David A. Labonte

Area
  - Total: 28.09 sq mi (72.75 km^{2})
  - Land: 27.83 sq mi (72.08 km^{2})
  - Water: 0.26 sq mi (0.67 km^{2})
- Elevation: 269 ft (82 m)

Population (2020)
  - Total: 6,110
  - Density: 220/sq mi (84.8/km^{2})
- Time zone: UTC−5 (Eastern)
  - Summer (DST): UTC−4 (Eastern)
- ZIP Code: 01033
- Area code: 413
- FIPS code: 25-26535
- GNIS feature ID: 0618200
- Website: www.granby-ma.gov

Granby is a town in Hampshire County, Massachusetts, United States. The population was 6,110 at the 2020 census. It is part of the Springfield, Massachusetts Metropolitan Statistical Area. The census-designated place of Granby corresponds to the main village of Granby in the center of the town.

== Etymology ==
The town is named in honor of John Manners, Marquess of Granby, a hero of the Seven Years' War. The place name, Granby, refers to a village in Nottinghamshire, taking its name from the personal name Gráni and the Old English suffix bȳ, denoting a farmstead or settlement.

== History ==
=== Settlement ===
Granby was once part of Hadley, as were other towns, as part of Hadley Equivalent Lands. Old Hadley was first settled in 1659 by people from Hartford and Wethersfield, Connecticut. These settlers left Connecticut because of religious differences within their communities.

John Pynchon was commissioned to buy wilderness land for their new community. In 1658, Pynchon negotiated a deed with three Norwottuck sachems: Chickwalloppe (alias Wawhillowa), Umpanchela (alias Womscom), and Quonquont (alias Wompshaw). The deed reserved land for a cornfield for the Norwottuck and promised rights to hunt, fish and set up wigwams within the negotiated land. Ownership was transferred to the settlers and confirmed by the General Court. These original boundaries include part of present-day Granby.

In August 1662, Pynchon negotiated a deed with Awonunsk, her husband Wequagon, and her son Squomp, for land also in present-day Granby, South Hadley and Belchertown. Ownership was transferred to the settlers and Awonunsk and her family were paid in 150 fathoms of wampum (approximately 54,000 wampum beads), 10 coats, and 2 yards of cloth, among other items. The deed also promised rights for the Norwottuck to hunt, fish, collect wood, and set up wigwams on the commons.

=== Separation from Hadley and South Hadley ===
Granby was settled in 1727. In November 1727, residents of what are now South Hadley and Granby petitioned the General Court to form a precinct within the Town of Hadley. This petition was granted on July 4, 1732, creating Hadley's South Precinct. In 1753, the precinct was granted district status. From 1751 through 1761, the district was deadlocked over whether to build a new meetinghouse west of Cold Hill, in present-day South Hadley, or to its east, in present-day Granby. In the Summer of 1761, the district's west side began constructing a meetinghouse without town meeting approval. In response, a group of 27 east side residents and three west side residents tore down the partially constructed meetinghouse.

In 1762, the General Court split the district into an east and west parish, each with its own meetinghouse. With tensions between the parishes still high, the General Court set off the east parish as the Town of Granby, being incorporated on June 11, 1768.

=== 20th century ===
Granby is one of only three towns in Massachusetts whose local telephone service is not furnished by the former Bell System as Granby has maintained its own service, Granby Telephone & Telegraph, since 1903. The other two such towns are Richmond and Hancock, both in Berkshire County.

== Geography ==
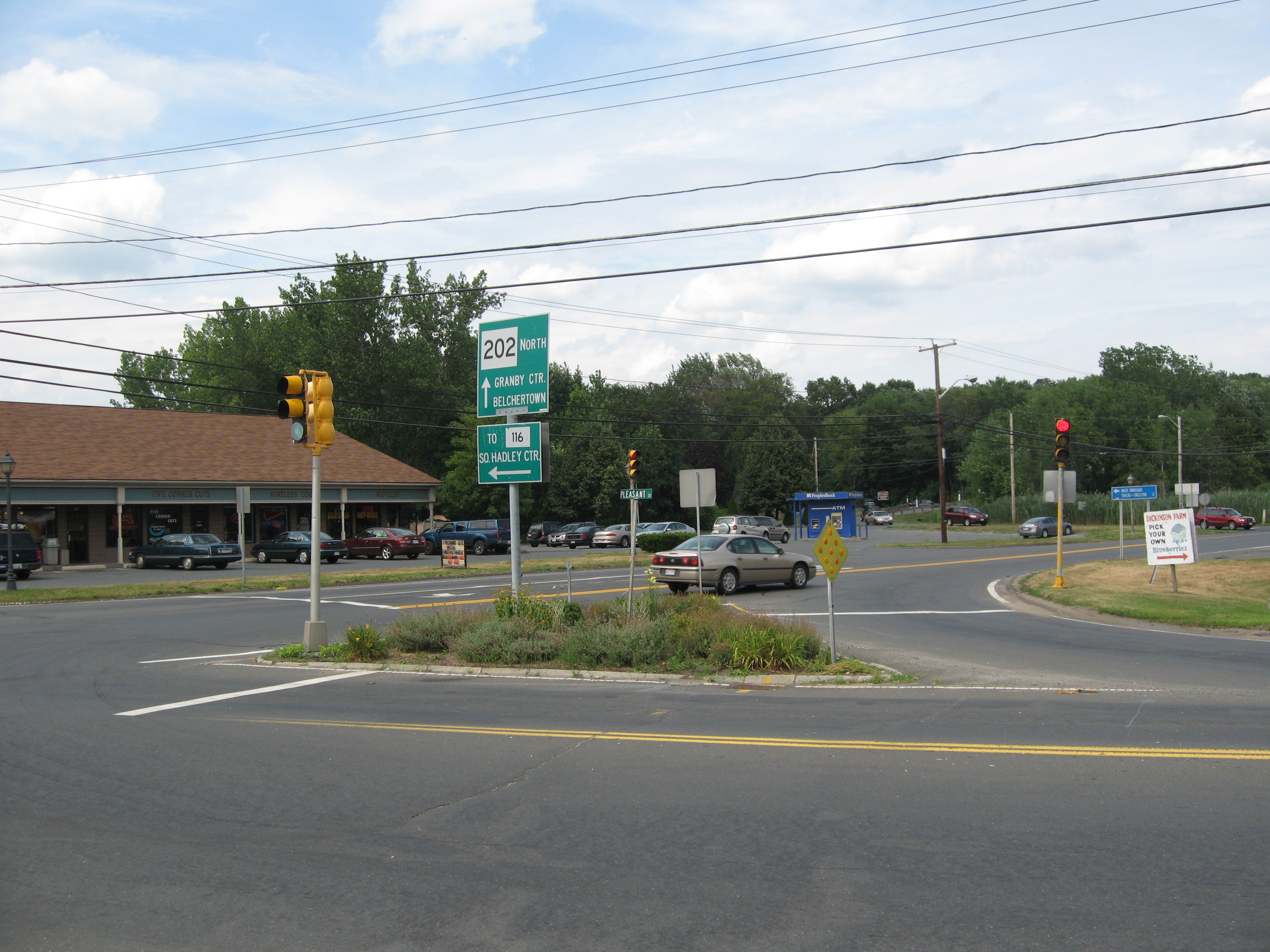
View of Five Corners in Granby

According to the United States Census Bureau, the town has a total area of 28.1 square miles (72.7 km^{2}), of which 27.8 square miles (72.1 km^{2}) are land and 0.27 square miles (0.7 km^{2}), or 0.92%, is water. Granby is bordered by South Hadley to the west, Amherst to the north, Belchertown to the east, and Ludlow and Chicopee to the south. Two highways pass through the town: U.S. Route 202 runs eastward though town from South Hadley to Belchertown on East State Street and West State Street, while Route 116 runs northeastward from South Hadley to Amherst along Amherst Road. Granby is 13 miles (21 km) north of Springfield, the largest city in western Massachusetts.

The Holyoke Range is in the northern part of Granby. Major peaks within the town are Long Mountain and Mount Norwottuck. Norwottuck is the highest point in town at 1,106 feet (337 m) above sea level. The Metacomet-Monadnock Trail runs along this mountain range as it passes through Granby. The Horse Caves are geological ledges along this trail.

== Demographics ==
Historical population
Year	Pop.	±%
1790	596	—
1850	1,104	+85.2%
1860	907	−17.8%
1870	863	−4.9%
1880	753	−12.7%
1890	765	+1.6%
1900	761	−0.5%
1910	761	+0.0%
1920	779	+2.4%
1930	891	+14.4%
1940	1,085	+21.8%
1950	1,861	+71.5%
1960	4,221	+126.8%
1970	5,473	+29.7%
1980	5,380	−1.7%
1990	5,565	+3.4%
2000	6,132	+10.2%
2010	6,240	+1.8%
2020	6,110	−2.1%
2022*	6,055	−0.9%
* = population estimate.

As of the census of 2000, there were 6,132 people, 2,247 households, and 1,662 families residing in the town. The population density was 220.1 inhabitants per square mile (85.0/km^{2}). There were 2,295 housing units at an average density of 82.4 per square mile (31.8/km^{2}). The racial makeup of the town was 96.77% White, 0.51% Black or African American, 0.13% Native American, 0.96% Asian, 0.02% Pacific Islander, 0.52% from other races, and 1.09% from two or more races. Hispanic or Latino of any race were 1.21% of the population.

There were 2,247 households, out of which 34.5% had children under the age of 18 living with them, 62.8% were married couples living together, 8.2% had a female householder with no husband present, and 26.0% were non-families. Of all households, 20.1% were made up of individuals, and 7.9% had someone living alone who was 65 years of age or older. The average household size was 2.71 and the average family size was 3.15.

In the town, the population was spread out, with 25.5% under the age of 18, 7.0% from 18 to 24, 30.6% from 25 to 44, 25.2% from 45 to 64, and 11.7% who were 65 years of age or older. The median age was 38 years. For every 100 females, there were 96.0 males. For every 100 females age 18 and over, there were 94.3 males.

The median income for a household in the town was $54,293, and the median income for a family was $57,632. Males had a median income of $40,833 versus $30,597 for females. The per capita income for the town was $23,209. About 1.0% of families and 2.2% of the population were below the poverty line, including 2.8% of those under age 18 and 2.0% of those age 65 or over.

== Education ==
Granby has one public elementary school serving K–6, the East Meadow School. Middle and high school students attend Granby Junior Senior High School. The MacDuffie School, a private preparatory school, is also located in Granby.

Mount Holyoke College land extends into Granby.

== Natural features ==
- Horse Caves

== Notable people ==
- Charles Burchard, Wisconsin legislator
- George Cobb, sports coach
- William Montague Ferry (1796–1867), a Presbyterian minister, missionary, and community leader who founded several settlements in Ottawa County, Michigan
- Abbie E. C. Lathrop (1868–1918), mouse fancier-breeder and accidental early pioneer in genetic research
- Zenas Ferry Moody (1832–1917), seventh governor of the state of Oregon
