= Rattlesnake Mountain =

Rattlesnake Mountain is the name of 55 summits in the United States alone, including:

== Alabama ==
- Rattlesnake Mountain, Cleburne, Alabama

== Arkansas ==
- Rattlesnake Mountain, Saline, Arkansas
- Rattlesnake Mountain, Polk, Arkansas

== California ==
- Rattlesnake Mountain, Placer, California
- Rattlesnake Mountain, Siskiyou, California
- Rattlesnake Mountain, Del Norte, California
- Rattlesnake Mountain, San Bernardino, California
- Rattlesnake Mountain, Fire Department Oak Springs, San Bernardino, California
- Rattlesnake Mountain, Tierra Del Sol, California
- Rattlesnake Mountain, Santee/Lakeside, California

== Colorado ==
- Rattlesnake Mountain, Fremont, Colorado

== Connecticut ==
- Rattlesnake Mountain, Farmington, Connecticut

== Maine ==
- Rattlesnake Mountain, Porter, Maine
- Rattlesnake Mountain, Raymond, Maine
- Rattlesnake Mountain, Stoneham, Maine

== Massachusetts ==
- Rattlesnake Mountain, also known as Farley Ledges, a bluff on the southeast side of Northfield Mountain in Erving, Massachusetts
- Rattlesnake Mountain, Wales, Massachusetts

== Nevada ==
- Rattlesnake Mountain, Elko County
- Rattlesnake Mountain, Washoe County

== New Hampshire ==
- Rattlesnake Mountain, Alton, New Hampshire
- Rattlesnake Mountain, North Conway, New Hampshire
- Rattlesnake Mountain, Ossipee, New Hampshire
- Rattlesnake Mountain, Rumney, New Hampshire
- Rattlesnake Mountain, West Swanzey, New Hampshire
- West Rattlesnake Mountain, Holderness, New Hampshire
- East Rattlesnake Mountain, Sandwich, New Hampshire

== Virginia ==
- Rattlesnake Mountain, Fauquier County, Virginia

== Washington ==
- Rattlesnake Mountain, Benton County, Washington
- Rattlesnake Mountain, part of Rattlesnake Ridge, King County, Washington

== Wyoming ==
- Rattlesnake Mountain, Buffalo Bill State Park, Wyoming

== Other variations of the name include ==
- Rattlesnake Knob, a peak on Mount Norwottuck in Massachusetts
- The Rattlesnakes (East Rattlesnake and West Rattlesnake), a pair of rocky hills in the Squam Range of New Hampshire
- Rattlesnake Point (USA), a mountain summit in Texas, USA
- Rattlesnake Mountains (Montana), a subrange of the Rocky Mountains in western Montana

== Folk Music ==
- Rattlesnake Mountain is a traditional American folk song.
