= Union Turnpike (Massachusetts) =

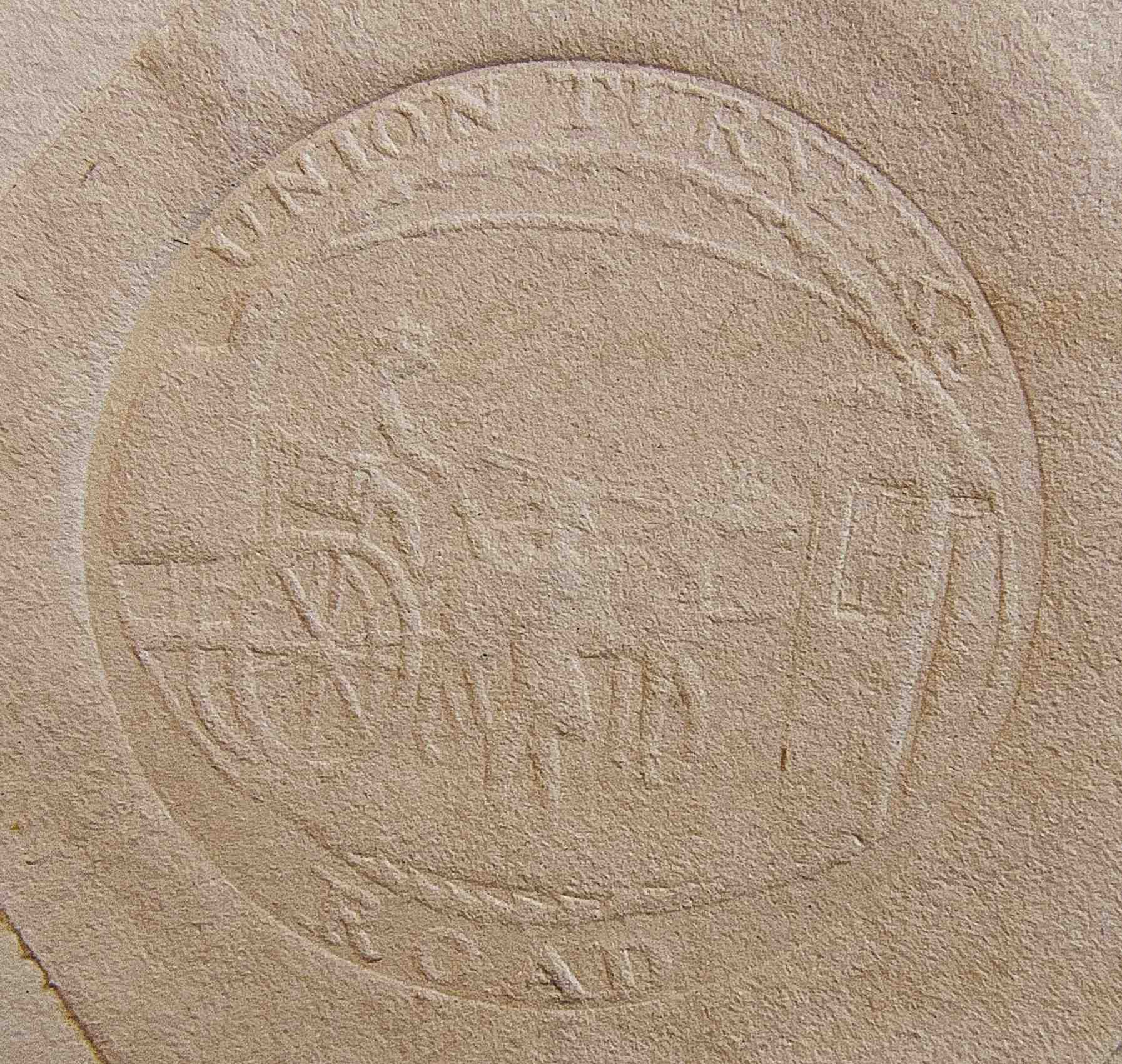
Embossed Union Turnpike Corporate Seal as attached to a stock share

The Union Turnpike was one of over 60 toll roads in operation throughout Massachusetts in the first half of the 19th century. In the early part of 1803, a group of investors headed by Henry Bromfield (1727–1820) petitioned the Massachusetts State Legislature to form a corporation for the purpose of constructing a toll road from the center of Concord to Leominster.

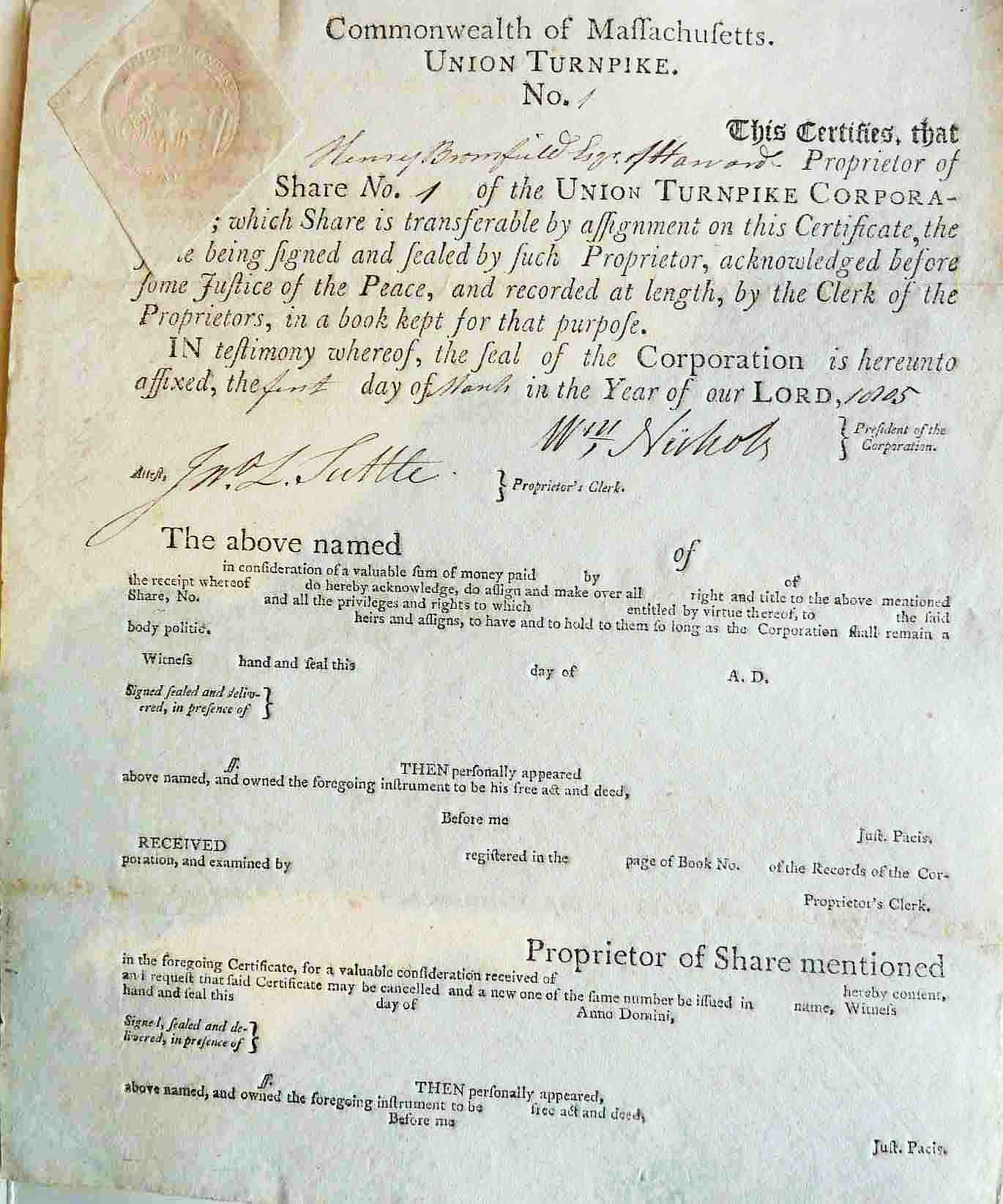
Union Turnpike Corporation, Stock share certificate No. 1

== Petition to the Legislature ==
Bromfield was a Boston merchant who moved with his family to Harvard, Massachusetts, in 1765 and later served in the Revolutionary War. The Turnpike would connect Concord with the western terminus of the Cambridge and Concord Turnpike and would terminate at the Kendall Tavern in Leominster, where the traveler could continue westward to Greenfield with the Fifth Massachusetts Turnpike.

In their petition to the Legislature, the subscribers indicated:

That the road now travelled … is circuitous, and the length calculation of the distance is twenty nine miles – That a road may be made nearly on a straight line from the termination of said Turnpike to Cambridge and Concord Turnpike on which an actual survey has been made on ground capable of making a good road the distance of which is only twenty three miles and to make a road on said route would be of public convenience. Our Petitioners therefore pray that your Honours would incorporate them and their associates into a body politic for the purpose of building a Turnpike road … and allow your petitioners and their associates such toll as in your wisdom you may think reasonable for the expense of making said road.

On January 24, 1804, the Joint Committee on Turnpikes, Bridges, and Canals approved the petition, and March 2, 1804, the Legislature approved "An Act to Establish a Corporation with the Name of Union Turnpike Corporation."

A letter was sent to potential shareholders promoting the proposed turnpike as a sound investment. The expense of making the road was estimated at $25,000 (approximately $550,000 in current dollars) and would be covered by the issuance of 500 shares. The letter pointed out that the Fifth Massachusetts Turnpike, to which the Union would connect, had two branches running to the Connecticut River, one ending in Greenfield and other in Northfield. Furthermore, there were additional feeder turnpike roads in Vermont and New Hampshire. "All these branches lead into a large section of the County, thickly settled with inhabitants and will all centre in Leominster where the 5th Mass Turnpike ends. The saving in distance and the ground being equally good for a road…bids fair to be the most productive to the proprietors on any in the Country that distance from the Capitol." The first share was issued on March 1, 1805, to Henry Bromfield, Esq. of Harvard.

The optimism of the proprietors was apparently not shared by the stage coach lines, according to Frederic J. Wood in his Turnpikes of New England.

A study of the routes followed by the different lines of stages shows that generally the turnpikes were followed, but it is seen that the Cambridge and Concord and the Union turnpikes were scrupulously avoided. The Union was not badly located, but it suffered from its associations, for the Cambridge and Concord was built straight without regard to centers along the route, and in one case, at least, with a fatal disregard for grades... [T]he stages from the northwestern part of the state, reaching the western end of the Union Turnpike, diverted over the short Lancaster and Bolton Turnpike and proceeded thence to Boston over the "Great Road" through Sudbury and Waltham.

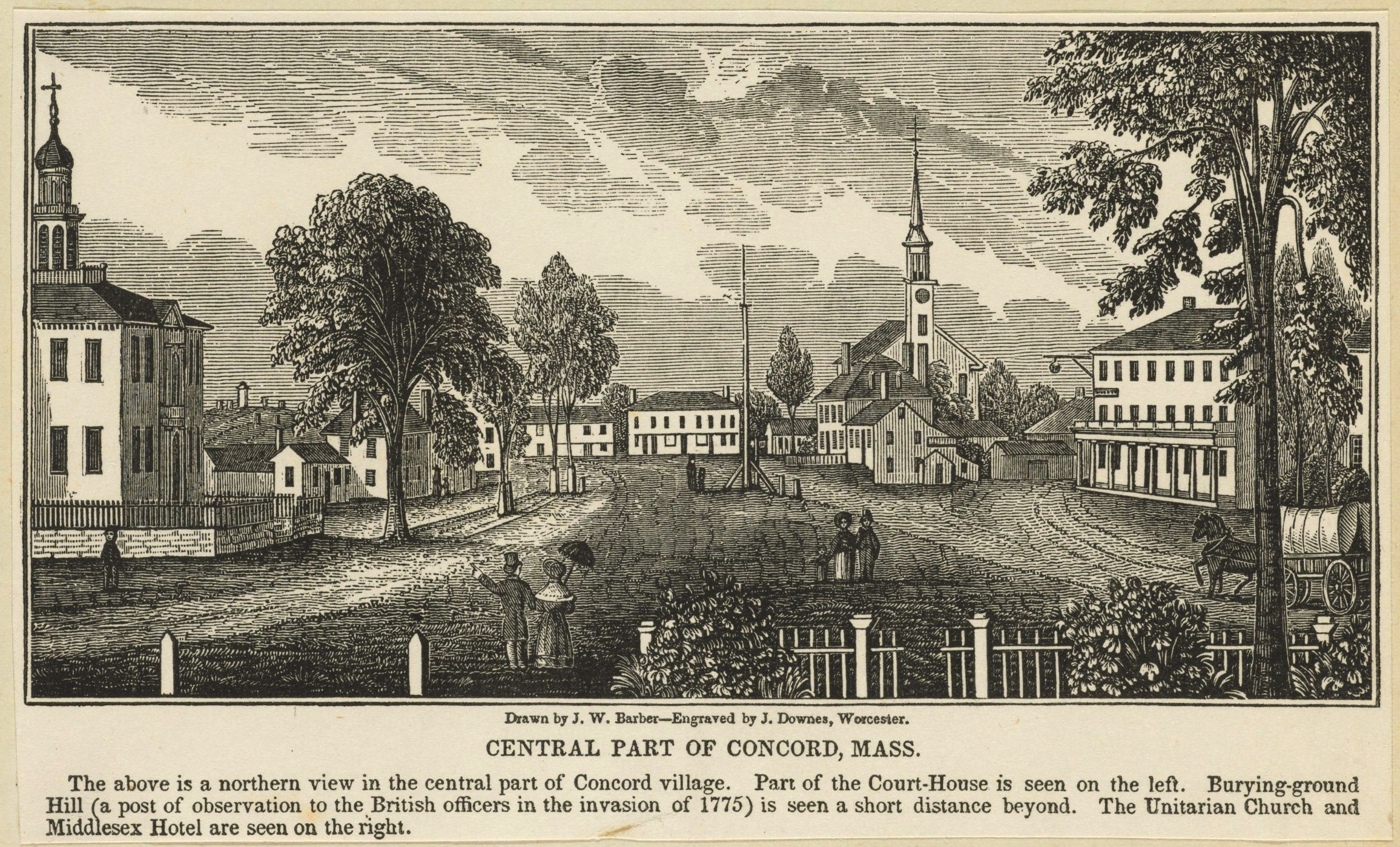
Concord, MA (c.1839), eastern terminus of the Union Turnpike

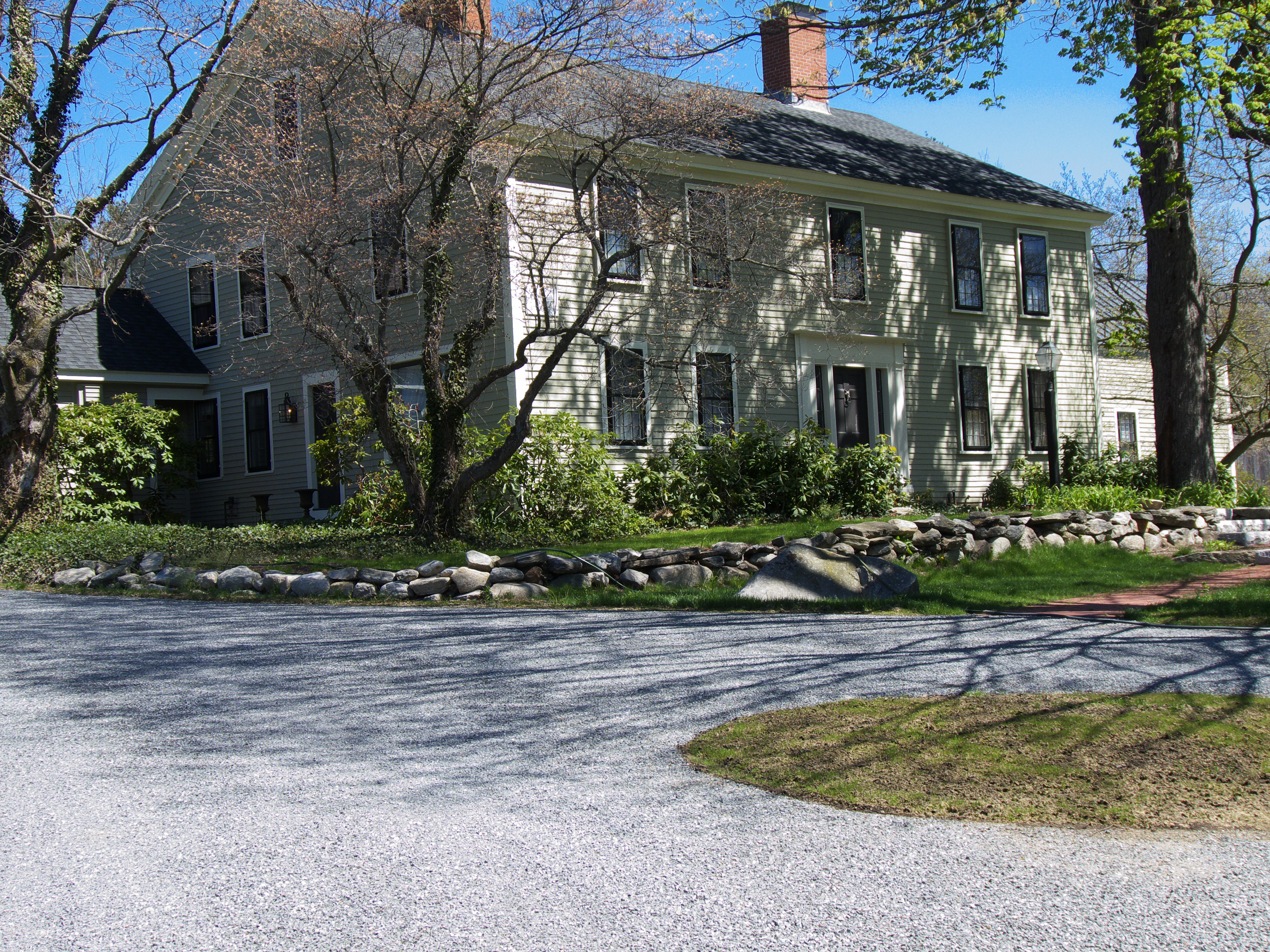
Ephraim Hosmer house, c.1750, Acton, enlarged by son, Joel, in 1807 to serve as a tavern on the Union Turnpike

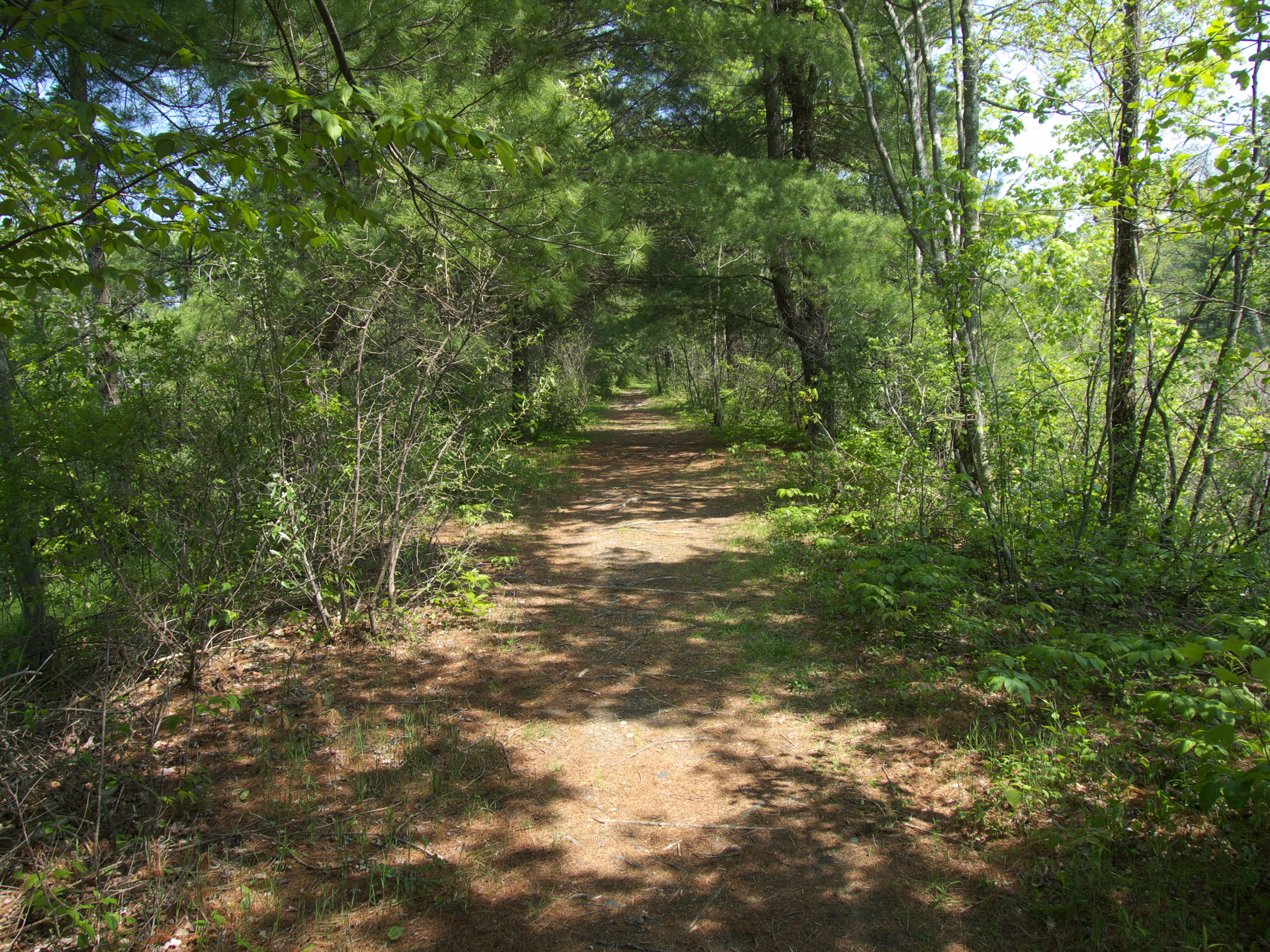
Turnpike Trail, Oxbow National Wildlife Refuge, former Union Turnpike route

Indeed, before the road had been accepted by the county, the proprietors of the corporation held a meeting at Wetherbee's Tavern in Harvard. On the agenda was an item "to determine what disposition shall be made of the shares that remain unsold", followed by an item to consider whether the corporation should consider building public houses for travelers along the road.

== Legal problems ==
Early in its history, the Union Turnpike Corporation was involved in a court case which became a part of the development of corporate liability law in the United States. "[U]ntil around 1800 – there was no notion of the attribute of limited liability and no actual manifestation of it as such… Corporations then were not unlimited but they were not limited either—hence, the question of limited vs. unlimited liability had not yet been formulated." In 1807, Benjamin W. Willard of Worcester County received a judgment in his favor from the county's Court of Common Pleas against "President, Director and Company of the Union Turnpike Corporation" for non-payment of a promissory note which had been made to Willard by Benjamin Kimball, the corporation's treasurer. Willard obtained a writ of execution, a legal document that allows a sheriff to attach personal property of the debtor. Failing to find any personal property in the amount of the debt, the sheriff, Moses Thomas, arrested Kimball. The corporation, in turn, sued the sheriff. The judge in Nichols v. Thomas, Chief Justice Parsons, ruled in favor of the Turnpike Corporation, making it "clear that a judgment against a corporation is not a judgment against its shareholders."

== Turnpike route and change to a public road ==
The eastern terminus of the turnpike was at the junction of what is today the intersection of Elm and Main streets in Concord. The road followed the present Massachusetts Route 111 westward from Concord through Boxborough to Harvard. Here it departed from Rt. 111, rising nearly 500 feet (150 m) in less than 1.5 miles (2.4 km), an incline of nearly 7%. This might have been one of the sections of the road, in Wood's words, "with a fatal disregard for grades." Such grades might require "either a greater number or more powerful horses than would be requisite if the road were entirely level." From Harvard Center, the road went west on Madigan Lane, descending 750 feet (230 m) to what is now the Oxbow National Wildlife Refuge along a causeway named Turnpike Trail where it crossed the Nashua River entering Lancaster. In Lancaster, the turnpike followed the road currently called Old Union Turnpike then entered Leominster, traveled 2 miles (3 km) northwest through what is now a wooded area, then joined the current Prospect Street to Lindell Avenue and finally joined the 5th Massachusetts Turnpike at the Kendall Inn on West Street, for a total length of just over 23 miles (37 km) from Concord.

Over the history of the turnpike, the corporation made several changes in routing. In 1807 they petitioned the legislature to straighten the road slightly as it approached the Kendall Inn, for a saving in length of 825 feet (251 m).

By 1810 the road had still not been completed, and in a petition to the legislature February of that year the proprietors stated, "that from the great Expenses of making Said Road and from unfortunate Accidents they have been prevent from Completing Same… Wherefore your Petitioners humbly pray that they may be allow further time to Complete Said Road."

As with so many of the other 19th century turnpike roads, financial difficulties made upkeep of the Union Turnpike difficult. In 1814 the Town of Boxborough voted "to keep the Turn-pike road in repair as far as it lies in Boxborough for one year, provided the Corporation will admit the inhabitants of said Boxborough passing the gates toll free." The corporation felt required to make further changes several years later. In January 1818, the corporation petitioned the legislature to move the sites for their gates. Nourse in his History of Harvard indicates that a freshet in 1818 destroyed the turnpike's bridge across the Nashua River in Harvard and that the traffic over the road did not justify rebuilding the bridge. The following year, the corporation petitioned the legislature for permission to abandon the bridge and move south about 0.5 miles (0.8 km) to the present Still River and Still River Depot roads. In its petition the proprietors said "that they have expended a large sum of money" building the turnpike, "and have found it impracticable to maintain and keep in repair that part of said Turnpike Road and Bridges where it crosses the Nashua River…and that said Turnpike Road may be so altered as will be for publick utility." On January 31, 1820, the legislature approved this alteration and relieved the corporation the necessity of maintaining the abandoned section of the road.

In 1819, the legislature approved a request by the corporation to discontinue maintenance of the road from its start in Concord at Main Street to where the present Concord Reformatory is located. A legislative committee reviewing this request summarized the financial difficulties faced by the Union Turnpike, difficulties it shared with many of the other early nineteenth century toll roads:

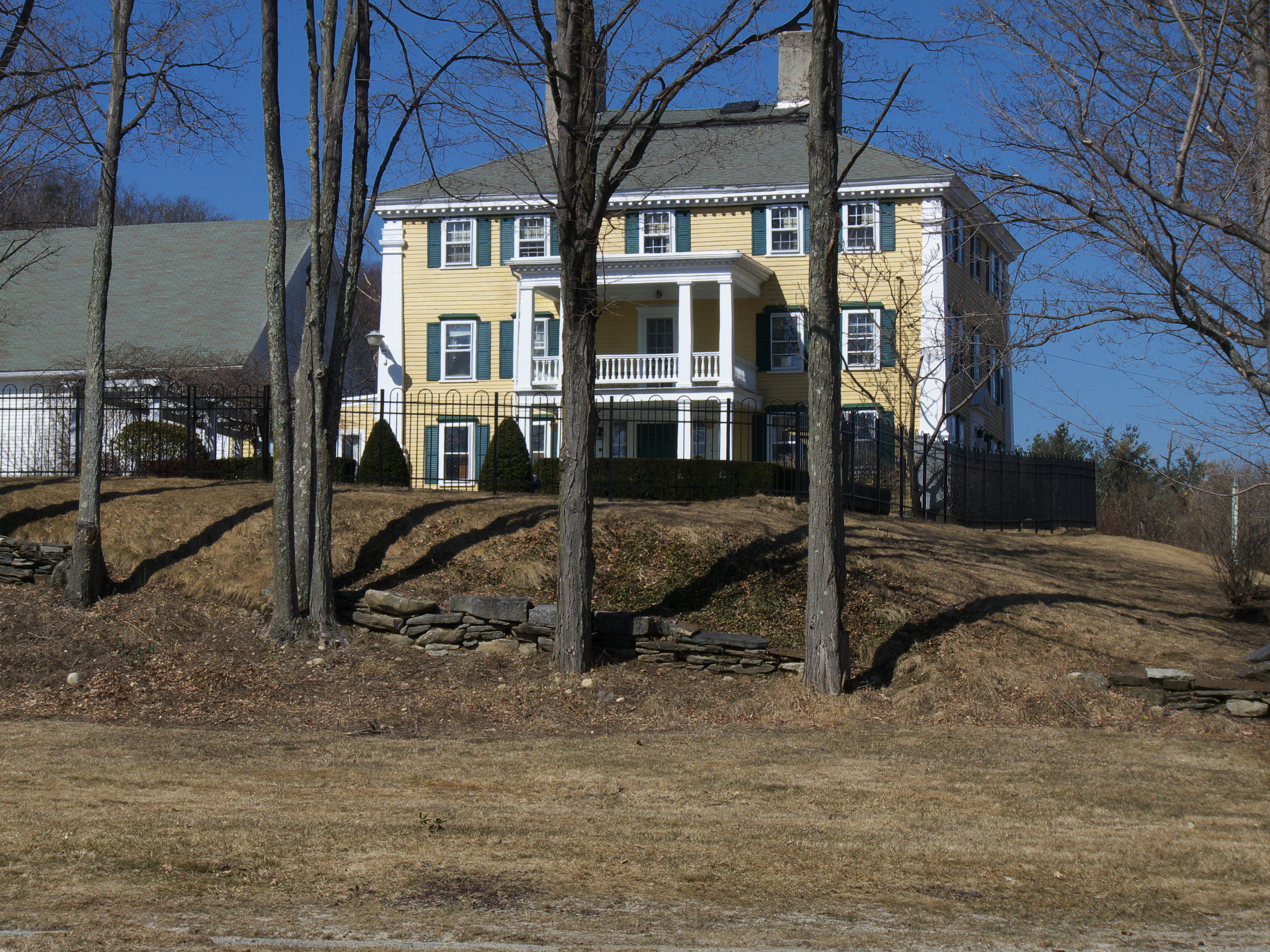
Kendall Tavern, Leominster, western terminus of the Union Turnpike

In the year 1809, this Turnpike went into operation, the whole amount of the toll monies from that time to the year 1818, a span of nine year, is $2,789.15. The whole expense of making the Turnpike including money paid for the land, is upwards of $40,000, the toll collection is not more than one percent on the actual cost of the Turnpike. There has never been a dividend. The whole income of the road, together with large assessments has been expended in paying gate keepers and in repairing the road, and there is now due from said Corporation demands of $300 which they have no funds to pay.

In an effort to both raise additional funds and save money on maintenance expenses, the proprietors meeting at the house of Ezra Witherbee in Harvard in June 1826 voted to petition the legislature to allow individual proprietors to purchase more than ten shares from other proprietors wishing to sell shares and "that said Corporation not be holden to make the bridges on said Turnpike more than eighteen feet in width."

After years of unprofitability, the Union Turnpike petitioned the Commissioners of Worcester County to convert the road to a public highway. The petition was accepted by the Commissioners in September 1829. In 1830 the Middlesex County section of the turnpike was declared a public road. Boxborough approved $300 for repairs, and in 1868, in an effort to avoid the steep inclines mention previously, the town discontinued the section of the road over the hill east of Guggin's Brook.
