= Fifth Massachusetts Turnpike =

The Fifth Massachusetts Turnpike was one of over 60 toll roads in operation throughout Massachusetts in the first half of the 19th century. An act establishing the Corporation was approved by the Massachusetts legislature on March 1, 1799. The Preamble to the act reads:

Whereas the high way leading from Northfield ... through Warwick & Orange to Athol & also from Greenfield through Montague & unimproved Lands up Miller's River to Athol aforesaid thence through Gerry [Phillipston], Templeton, Gardner, Westminster & Fitchburgh to Leominster ... is Rocky & Mountainous, & the expense of straitening, making & repairing the same through the said Towns so that the same may be conveniently travelled with Horses & Carriages is much greater than reasonably ought to be required of said Towns; Be it therefore Enacted ...

== Route ==
The eastern terminus of the road was at the tavern of Jonas Kendall on what is now West St. in Leominster. With the completion of the Cambridge and Concord Turnpike and the Union Turnpike from Concord to Leominster, the traveler was able make a direct connection from the Fifth to Boston.

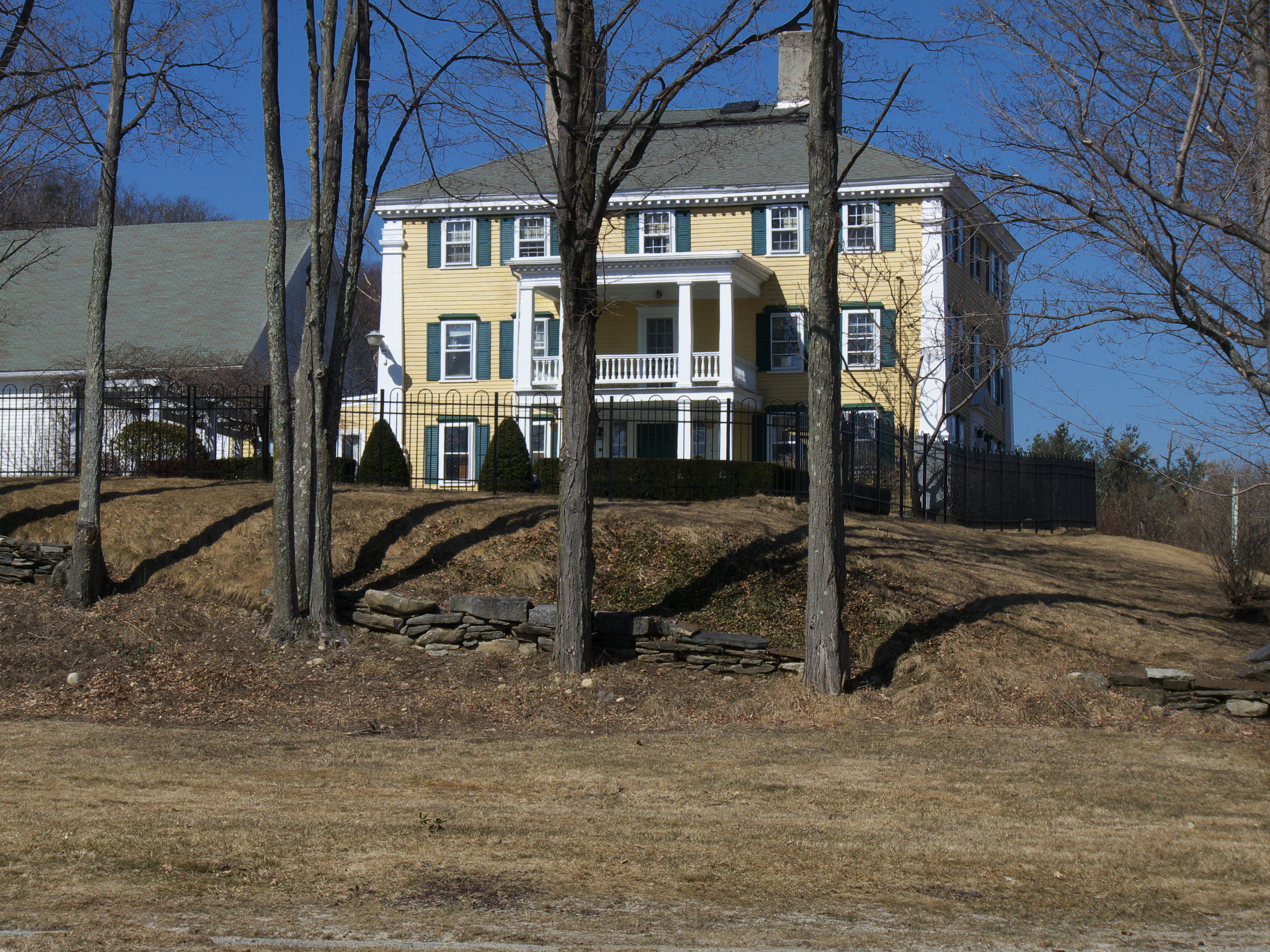
Site of former Kendall Tavern, Leominster, MA.

From the Kendall Tavern, the Fifth proceeded west through a portion of south Fitchburg along a road which still carries the turnpike name. From Fitchburg, the Turnpike ran through Westminster and Gardner along what is now East and West Broadway, through Templeton, Phillipston (then named "Gerry"), and then to Athol and Brooks Tavern on the Uptown Common at the junction of Main and Chestnut streets, the center of Athol before the arrival of the railroad.

From the Common in Athol the Turnpike split into two branches. The Greenfield Branch continued west down Chestnut Street, then along a portion of South Athol Road and crossed the Millers River near the current railroad bridge and joined South Main Street. The Turnpike followed the current Route 2A through Orange and into Erving where it departed from Route 2A for approximately 1.4 miles (2.3 km) and ran through a wooded area which is now a part of Erving State Forest. It then rejoined Route 2 and continued west traveling briefly along the route of Old State Road before again crossing the Millers River at the village of Millers Falls. Here it followed what is now Millers Falls Road and then Turnpike Road to Montague City Road where it crossed the Connecticut River into Greenfield just north of its junction with the Deerfield River. The river crossing here was initially by ferry and later by bridge. The turnpike went up what is now Mountain Road through Temple Woods onto Crescent Street and then Main where it reached its western terminus at tavern of Calvin Munn. The Turnpike opened a direct route to the eastern part of the state which up to this point had only been accessible for long distance commerce by the Connecticut River.

The second branch of the Turnpike leaving Athol was the Northfield Branch which crossed the Millers River at Crescent Street to Fish Street, Pequoig Avenue and Pinedale Avenue where it headed west crossing the conservation area and then the Tully River. On the west bank of the river, the Turnpike ran north past the Sentinel Elm passing through Orange (now North Orange) on Main Street and entering Warwick on Hastings Heights Road. At this point the original route turned west crossing what is now Gale Road and then northwest through the present-day Arthur Iversen Conservation Area to the Mayo Inn in Warwick Center. The Turnpike left Warwick on Northfield Road and turned onto White Road then into what is now a wooded area where the old Turnpike right-of-way is now used as a portion of the Metacomet-Monadnock Trail. After crossing the border into Northfield, the Turnpike passed through present-day Northfield State Forest emerging onto Warwick Avenue and then turning north on Main Street where the original charter indicates road terminated at the tavern of Captain Elisa Hunt near School Street. Wood indicates, however, this was changed to Houghton's Corner.

== Alterations ==
Over the course of the Turnpike's history numerous alternations were made to the route and to the locations of the toll gates. Generally these changes required prior approval from the state legislature. Several route alterations in Athol provide a typical example. At a meeting of the Proprietors on Jan. 5, 1815, a vote was taken "that the Directors be authorised to petition the Legislature for leave to make such alteration in the Turnpike Roads in Athol, as shall supersede the necessity of supporting more than two bridges in said Town, across Millers River & of supporting any across Tully River ..." On June 15, 1815 the Massachusetts Legislature passed "An Act in addition to an Act", that is an act in addition to the original act of incorporation, authorizing the Turnpike Corporation "... to alter the road a little south of the Cotton Factory; then westerly by Simeon Fisher, across Miller's river, below its confluence with Tully river; then up said Tully river, till it reunites with the Northfield branch." At the annual meeting of the Proprietors on January 9, 1816, a vote was taken "... that the Directors Petition the Legislature, for leave to alter the Turnpike Road that leads from Greenfield to Athol, so that the same shall form a Junction with the Northfield branch on the West side of Millers River." In July of the same year a traverse of the proposed route changes was submitted by surveyor James Oliver and in January 1817 the Proprietors accepted the alterations.

In another section of the same act that the Legislature waived the requirement present in many of the turnpike incorporation acts that the road be laid out "in as straight a line as the ground will permit". The lawmakers authorized the Fifth Corporation to make these alterations "as shall facilitate the travel by going round instead of over hills, without much increase of length of way." This requirement that the turnpikes be laid out as straight as absolutely possible was a considerable irritant to both the road builders and users. For the builders it required additional construction costs. For the users, particularly those carrying heavy loads, it might have meant reducing the size of the load or increasing the number of draft animals pulling the load. Both could affect the user's costs. Even on an earth road with the best surface quality, a 2% grade can reduce the load a horse can pull by 50%

Additional changes to the Northfield Branch in Warwick were made at a later date. The original section of the road running east to west just north of Gale's Pond was moved to the southern portion of the present day Gale Road where is continued south to Orange. A further change extended "Gale Road from a short distance north of Gale's Pond to the present Athol road. This was done in 1826, and then the Brattleboro turnpike road over Hastings Heights was turned over to the town. The section of the Northfield turnpike form Gale Road west past the south end of the town common land to the old tavern was also abandoned."

== Financial considerations ==
=== Sale of shares ===
The initial financing of the Turnpike construction was through the sale of shares. In the first meeting of the Proprietors in April 1799, a committee was chosen to procure subscriptions for 1,600 shares to defray the costs of construction. By June of that year, the committee was able to report the sale of 413 shares and the treasurer was directed to procure bonds in the amount of $15,000.

Front and back of Turnpike stock certificate. Original at Fitchburg Historical Society

Over the lifetime of the Turnpike, annual dividends between $0.50 and $1.00 per share were paid out. At the first meeting of the Board of Directors of the Turnpike in October 1799, it was resolved that the average amount to be paid for the construction of the road was to be no more than approximately $720 per mile. The Directors also drew up a form of the agreements to be used with contractors engaged in the construction of the road. It included the specifications which were standard in many of the turnpike incorporation acts. The total width of the turnpike was to be 4 rods or 66 feet (20 m), with at least 18 feet (5.5 m) between the drainage ditches on either side and a road crown one foot higher than the ditches on dry ground and two feet higher in wet ground. They also specified "good and sufficient railings" where necessary and "where is practicable, the Ditches on the south side shall be clear of all obstructions & made smooth & level so that a sleigh may run in it when necessary." The Board of Directors regularly approved the payment of damages that occurred to individuals "by means of said Road running through their Land."

=== Tolls ===
Revenue was also derived from the collection of tolls at gates typically placed about every ten miles. The rates were set down in the act of incorporation and ranged from five cents for "For every Man & horse", nine cents for every sled or sleigh drawn by two oxen or horses, with an additional three cents for each additional animal in the team, to 25 cents "for every Coach, Phaeton, Chariot or other four wheel Carriage drawn by two horses" with four cents added for each additional horse. Domesticated animals were charged by the head. The Act also set out exemptions for the payment of tolls. For example, exempt were "any person who shall be passing with his Horse or Carriage to or from Public Worship or with his Horse Team or Cattle to or from his common labor on his Farm or to or from any Grist Mill or on the common or ordinary business of Family concerns or from any person or persons passing on Military duty." Typical annual toll receipts for the Fifth were about $4,000.

Tolls were not a particularly reliable source of income. Typically, the toll gates were located about every 10 miles. Thus there was ample opportunity for travelers to use local roads which intersected the Turnpike to bypass the gates. Such roads were often called "shunpikes" and could lead to significant loss of income. Fisher Ames, a member of the U.S. Congress and President of the Norfolk and Bristol Turnpike, the main road between Boston and Providence, at one point estimated that the company's earnings would be almost 60% greater if it were not for shunpikes. Because the locations of toll gates were set by the Massachusetts Legislature and any changes in these locations had to be approved by the Legislature, the flexibility of the Corporation to combat these "shunpikes" was limited.

=== Benefits to the economy ===
Most turnpike corporations were not money-making investments. As Wood writes, "it seems to have been generally known long before the rush of construction subsided that turnpike stock was worthless." He concludes, "the larger part of the turnpikes of New England were built in the hope of benefiting the towns and the local business conducted in them, counting more upon the collateral results than upon the direct returns in the matter of tolls."

William Sweetzer Heywood supports this conclusion in his history of the town of Westminster, one of the towns along the route of the Fifth. He writes, "This road was a great improvement on what had previously existed as a means of communication with the towns lying both eastward and westward being very direct and well graded and formed for many years the principal thoroughfare between Greenfield, Brattleboro, Albany and other places in that direction and Boston. Moreover it gave to Westminster an importance it never had before stimulating business enterprise and making it a center of travel and trade which conduced largely to the growth of the village and to the general prosperity of the community at large."

The 19th century American statesman Henry Clay, Sr. spoke of the wider benefits of turnpike construction in a speech in March 1818 relating to the power of Congress to make roads and canals. He stated, "I think it very possible that the capitalist who should invest his money in one of those objects might not be reimbursed three per centum annually upon it. And yet society in various forms might actually reap fifteen or twenty per centum."

== Dissolution of the turnpike ==
Continuing expenses for maintenance and damages against slowly declining toll receipts were certainly important factors in the decision of the shareholders to dissolve the Corporation in 1833. In the final years of operation the net balance in the Corporation's treasury was at times no more than $200. However, the arrival of the railroad in the second decade of the 19th century would have also contributed significantly to this decision. In 1827 the Massachusetts Legislature formed a commission to study the practically of building a railroad from Boston west through the state to the Hudson River. One of the three possible routes proposed by these experts followed more or less exactly the route of the Fifth. Just two years earlier this route had been surveyed for building a canal from Boston to the Hudson River and the Erie Canal. Now interest had shifted to what was considered the transportation mode of the future, the railroad. By the mid-1840s the Fitchburg Railroad was in operation and in 1850 it was extended to Greenfield, the western terminus of the Turnpike.

The final meeting of the Directors of the Fifth Massachusetts Turnpike Corporation took place on March 16, 1833 at the house of Joseph Young in Athol, MA, Col. Ephrain Stone was in the Chair. The Treasurer presented his report. The total tolls for the year 1832 were $3,304.97. The sale of six toll houses brought in $295.00; four yoke of oxen, $212.50; tools, $36.97; a note from Mr. Morton Demsters, $30.00. After remaining expenses were paid, the Treasurer made the final entry in the Corporation's records:

It appears by said report that the money has all been expended but fifteen dollars and that still remains in the hands of the Treasurer - March 16, 1833---.
