= Middlesex Turnpike =

Middlesex Turnpike may refer to:

- Middlesex Turnpike (Connecticut)
- Middlesex Turnpike (Massachusetts)
