= Rattlesnake Point =

Rattlesnake Point may refer to:

- Rattlesnake Point (Canada), a conservation area in Milton, Ontario, Canada
- Rattlesnake Point (United States), a mountain summit in Texas, United States
