= Central Turnpike (Massachusetts) =

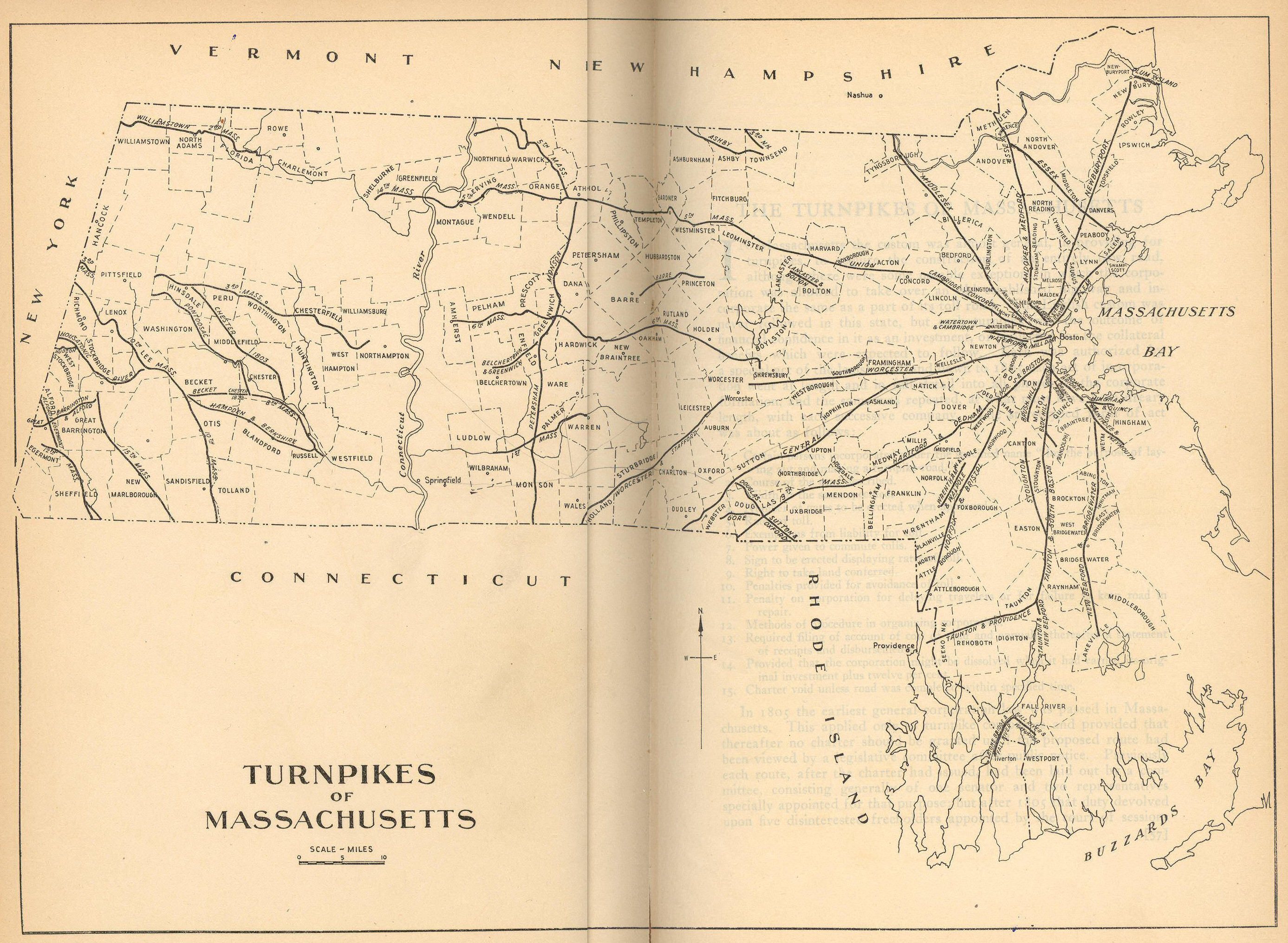
Map of the 19th century turnpikes in Massachusetts

The Central Turnpike was a private toll road in Massachusetts that was chartered by the Massachusetts State Legislature on June 12, 1824. The route began in Wellesley (at the time known as West Needham), heading west to Dudley, where it continued into Connecticut as the Center Turnpike.

The corporation was headed by Samuel Slater, Joseph Valentine, and John J. Clark. It was not completed until 1830, and was in revenue service for less than six years as a whole. In January 1836, the corporation ceded the entirety of its length in Middlesex County to the state, and made the remainder toll-free by 1839 when the corporation dissolved. The Connecticut portion of the turnpike, run as a separate corporation chartered in Connecticut, continued in service until 1853.

Today, the route is still mostly in use as various public roads, only a short unimproved section between Northbridge and Upton is not in use today.

== Route today ==
The Central Turnpike route begins in Wellesley, as the modern-day Central Street (Route 135) westbound, from its intersection with Grove Street and Washington Street (modern Route 16). This is how the historical route connected with the Worcester Turnpike (modern Route 9) as its charter stated. It follows Route 135 through Natick, Framingham, Ashland, and Hopkinton. In Hopkinton, it leaves the Route 135 alignment, and continues as West Main Street to the Upton town line. In Upton, it continues as Hopkinton Road, High Street, Hartford Avenue north, is briefly concurrent with Main Street (Route 140) across a multi-road intersection, to Hartford Ave south. The modern alignment then ends where the modern Clubhouse Lane continues, and an unimproved section of the original road continues to the Northbridge town line.

Continuing in Northbridge as the unimproved road, it returns to public roads as Upton St. Crossing Route 122, it becomes Sutton Street. Through Sutton it is named Central Turnpike for its entire length. In Oxford, it is modern Sutton Avenue briefly, past the intersection with Douglas Road (historical Douglas Pike), to Joe Jenny Road until the Webster border. In Webster, it is Sutton Avenue until it reaches Gore Road (modern Route 16). It is concurrent with Route 16 west until its terminus less than a mile away, where it continues through Webster as Route 12 south to Dudley. The route continues as Route 197 south shortly after entering the town, until the Connecticut border.
