= Medford Turnpike =

Road in Massachusetts, USA

Coordinates: 42°24′19.3″N 71°6′4.5″W

The Medford Turnpike is a road mostly in modern-day Somerville, Massachusetts, United States, now known as Mystic Avenue. It was laid out in 1803 as a result of the 1786 Charles River Bridge from Charlestown to Boston. In historic terms, it ran from Medford Center to Charlestown Neck. It is currently designated to be part of Massachusetts Route 38.

== History ==
The first meeting of the proprietors of the Medford Turnpike Corporation was held on the eleventh day of April, 1803.

The act of incorporation provided that the corporation shall be entitled to receive from each traveler or passenger the following rate of toll:

- For every coach, chariot, phaeton or other four-wheeled carriage for the conveyance of persons, drawn by not more than two horses, ten cents, and if drawn by more than two horses an additional sum of two cents for each horse;
- for every cart, wagon, sleigh or sled or other carriage of burden, drawn by not more than three cattle, six cents, if by more than three, an additional sum of two cents for every additional ox or horse;
- for every carriole, eight cents; for every cart drawn by one horse, four cents;
- for every sleigh for the conveyance of persons drawn by two horses, six cents, and if drawn by more than two horses an additional sum of two cents for each horse;
- for every sled or sleigh drawn by one horse, four cents;
- for every chaise, chair or other wheeled carriage drawn by one horse, six cents;
- for every man and horse, two cents;
- for all oxen, horses, neat-cattle, led or driven, besides those in carriages and teams, five mills; for all sheep and swine, two cents by the dozen, and in the same proportion for a greater or less number.
- Provided that nothing in this act shall authorize said corporation to demand toll of any person who shall be passing with their horse and carriage to or from his usual place of public worship, or with his horses, team or cattle to or from the common labors of his farm, and when no toll-gatherer shall be present at said gate to receive the toll, the said gate shall be left open and travelers be permitted to pass freely.

At the meeting held May 5, 1803, Nathaniel Hall was appointed an agent to petition the Court of General Sessions to appoint a committee to lay out and appraise the lands taken for the Medford Turnpike Road.

At a meeting held May 8, 1861, it was voted that the corporation hereby give their consent to the county commissioners of Middlesex County to lay open their road as a public highway. The laying out of Medford Street in Medford and Somerville around the southerly side of Winter Hill, thus avoiding the climb over the top of the hill, contributed to reduce the revenue of the company and thus assisted in its final collapse.

The turnpike road was used by the sporting portion of the community as a course for the speeding of horses.

There were no known incidents of the toll-gatherer being robbed of a busy day's receipts, as was the case in other places, but the turnpike road was once the scene of a sensational highway robbery, when Major Bray was held up and robbed by the notorious highwayman, Mike Martin. It is said that on Mrs. Bray's handing over her watch, the ‘knight of the road’ immediately returned it, saying he ‘never robbed a lady.’

At a meeting held January 24, 1866, it was voted that the directors be directed to petition the legislature for leave to abandon the Medford Turnpike. The petition was presented January 27, 1866, and leave to abandon was granted, and the road was laid out by the county commissioners as a public way.

== See also ==
- 19th-century turnpikes in Massachusetts
