= List of turnpikes in Massachusetts =

Highway system

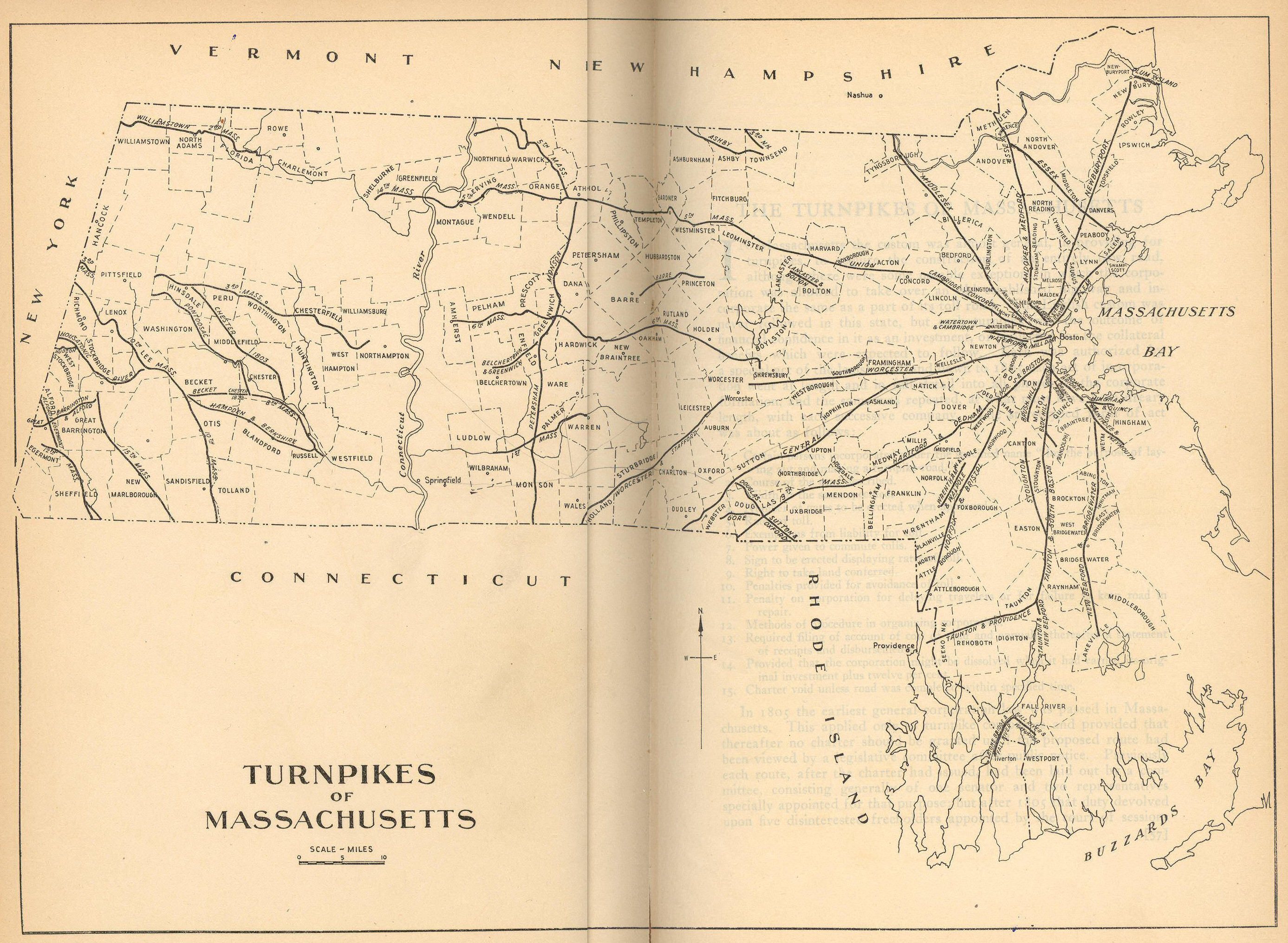
Map of the 19th century turnpikes in Massachusetts

This is a list of turnpike roads, built and operated by nonprofit turnpike trusts or private companies in exchange for the privilege of collecting a toll, in the U.S. state of Massachusetts, mainly in the 19th century. While most of the roads are now maintained as free public roads, some have been abandoned.

== Background ==
In the late 18th century and early 19th century, turnpikes, as opposed to ordinary roads of the same time, were roads where gates barred travelers from continuing and at which payments were demanded for the use of the road. The word "turnpike" itself comes from the fact that these gates, called "pikes," were "turned" once the toll was paid. The privilege of building and operating turnpikes was conferred by the state legislature to "turnpike corporations". Turnpikes were constructed using private capital, were privately owned, and were operated for revenue from toll collection. The turnpike era in Massachusetts began in 1796, when the first act of incorporation for a turnpike was passed. By 1850, most turnpike corporations had either been dissolved or had stopped collecting tolls. In all, 118 acts of incorporation were passed (ten of these were in the territory that later became the state of Maine). Typical toll rates were twenty-five cents for every coach with additional charges of four cents for every man and horse.

== List of turnpikes ==
The following 19th century turnpikes were chartered and built in Massachusetts:

Turnpike name	Routing or location	Dates of operation	Modern designation
First Massachusetts Turnpike	North Wilbraham–Palmer–Warren	1796–1819	US 20–Old Warren Road–Route 67
Second Massachusetts Turnpike	North Adams–Drury–Charlemont	1797–1833	Route 2
Third Massachusetts Turnpike	New York state line near Lebanon Springs,Pittsfield,Worthington,Northampton	1797–1829	Lebanon Springs Road (abandoned)-West Street, Pittsfield resumed on east side of Pittsfield at Grange Hall Road-Robinson Road–Route 143–East Street/Chesterfield Road
Williamstown Turnpike	New York state line–Williamstown–North Adams		Berlin Road-Bee Hill Road-Route 2 The portion between Berlin Road and Bee Hill Road survives as a hiking trail.
Fifth Massachusetts Turnpike	Greenfield–Athol–Leominster (with branch from Athol to Northfield)	1799–1832	Route 2
Sixth Massachusetts Turnpike	Amherst–Greenwich–Oakham–Shrewsbury	1799–1829	Local roads west of Rutland and east of Holden; Route 122A (Rutland–Holden). Pelham–Greenwich is now under the Quabbin Reservoir.
Eighth Massachusetts Turnpike	Becket–Chester–Russell	1800–1844	US 20
Ninth Massachusetts Turnpike	Douglas–Mendon–Bellingham	1800–1833	Southwest Main Street–Hartford Avenue (old Middle Post Road)
Tenth Massachusetts Turnpike	New York line–Lenox–Becket–Sandisfield–Connecticut line	1800–1855	Route 8 / US 20–local streets north of Lenox
Third New Hampshire Turnpike	New Hampshire line–Townsend	1801–1826	Old Turnpike Road (connects to NH 124)
Twelfth Massachusetts Turnpike	Egremont–Sheffield—Connecticut line	1801–1857	US 7–Egremont Road–Route 23
Salem Turnpike	Boston–Lynn–Salem	1802–1868	Broadway–Route 107
Norfolk and Bristol Turnpike	Dedham		Washington Street–US 1 / Route 1A
Quincy Turnpike	Quincy		
Fourteenth Massachusetts Turnpike	Shelburne		
Camden Turnpike	Camden, Maine		
First Cumberland Turnpike	Cumberland, Maine		
Belchertown and Greenwich Turnpike	Belchertown		
Fifteenth Massachusetts Turnpike	Great Barrington		
Wiscasset and Augusta Turnpike	Augusta, Maine		
Medford Turnpike	Somerville		
Braintree and Weymouth Turnpike	Weymouth		
Chester Turnpike	Middlefield		
Cambridge and Concord Turnpike	Concord		
Newburyport Turnpike	Danvers		
Becket Turnpike	Becket		
Essex Turnpike	Middleton		Route 114
Wiscasset and Woolwich Turnpike	Maine		
North Branch Turnpike	Winchendon		
New Bedford and Bridgewater Turnpike	Weymouth		
Petersham and Monson Turnpike	Athol		
Union Turnpike (Massachusetts)	Concord–Leominster	1804–1830	
Taunton and New Bedford Turnpike	Not marked		
Blue Hill Turnpike	Milton		
Hartford and Dedham Turnpike	Millis		
Dorchester Turnpike	Dorchester		
Bath or Governor King's Turnpike	Maine		
Brush Hill Turnpike	Milton		
Andover and Medford Turnpike	Reading		
Middlesex Turnpike	Cambridge to Tyngsboro		Parallel to US 3; portions survive as present Broadway and Massachusetts Avenue in Cambridge, Massachusetts Avenue and Lowell Street in Arlington, Lowell Street in Lexington, Middlesex Turnpike in Burlington, Bedford, and Billerica, Old Middlesex Turnpike and a segment of River Street in Billierica, Turnpike Road, North Road, a segment of Princeton Street, Tyngsboro Road in Chelmsford, and Middlesex Road in Tyngsboro.
Worcester and Fitzwilliam Turnpike	Winchendon		
Ashby Turnpike	Ashby		Route 119
Worcester and Stafford Turnpike	Holland		
Plum Island Turnpike	Newbury		
Worcester Turnpike	Boston to Worcester		Route 9
Housatonic River Turnpike	West Stockbridge		
Alford and Egremont Turnpike	Egremont		
Lancaster and Bolton Turnpike	Bolton		
Wrentham and Walpole Turnpike	Walpole		
Stoughton Turnpike	Stoughton		
Taunton and South Boston Turnpike	Randolph		
Hingham and Quincy Turnpike	Hingham		
Hudson Turnpike	West Stockbridge		
Douglas, Sutton and Oxford Turnpike	Douglas		
Great Barrington and Alford Turnpike	Egremont		
Mill Dam	Boston		
Barre Turnpike	Barre–Princeton		Route 62
Chester Turnpike	Chester		
Watertown Turnpike	Watertown		
Central Turnpike	Framingham		
Turnpike from Cambridge to Watertown	Watertown		
Gore Turnpike	Douglas		
Pontoosac Turnpike	Chester		
Taunton and Providence Turnpike	Taunton		
Hampden and Berkshire Turnpike	Otis		
Granite Turnpike			
