= Oxbow National Wildlife Refuge =

Wildlife refuge in Massachusetts, United States

- IUCN category IV (habitat/species management area)
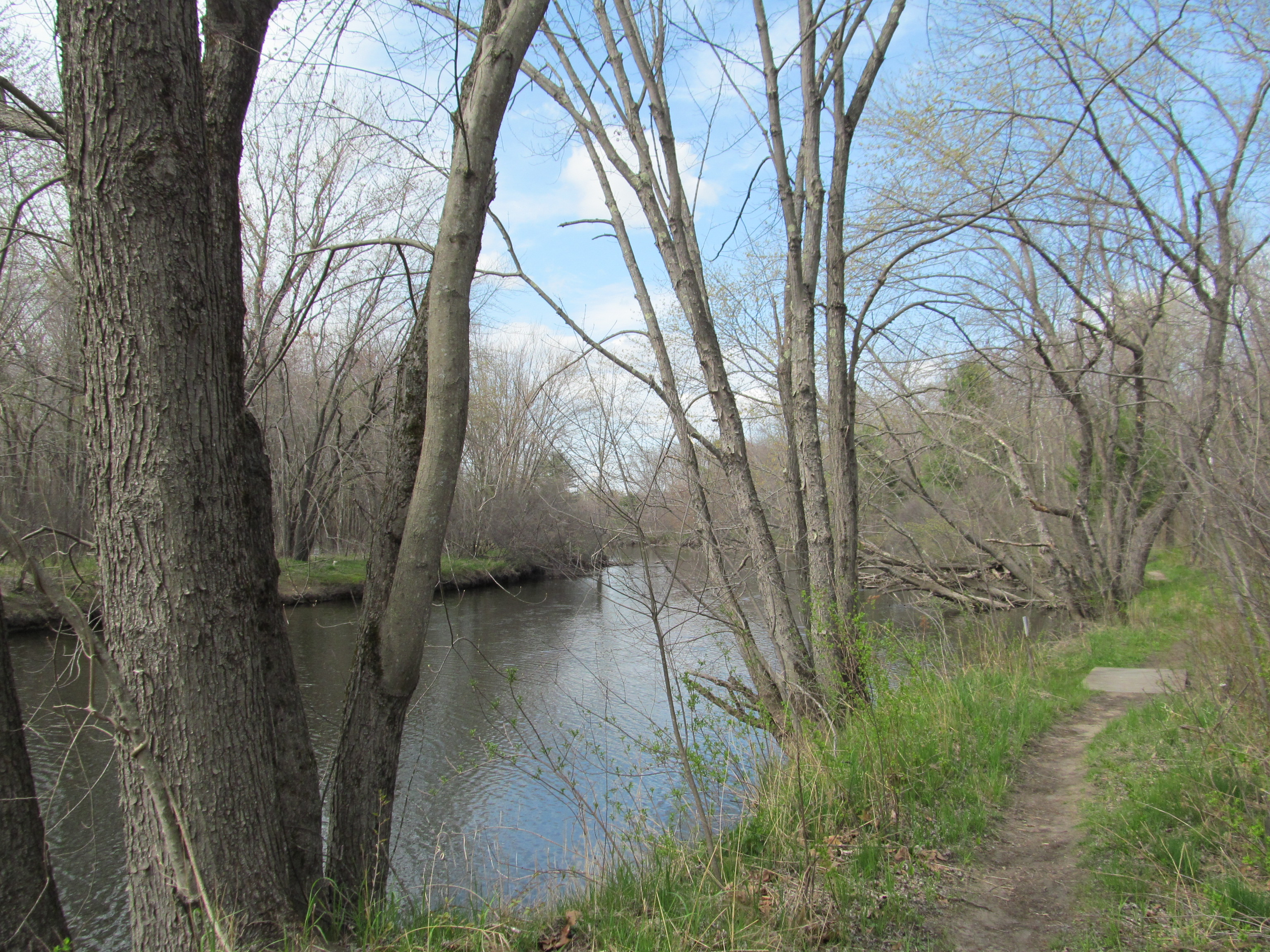
- Nashua River

- Location within the United States
- Location: Middlesex County, Worcester County, Massachusetts, United States
- Nearest city: Harvard, Massachusetts
- Coordinates: 42°29′50″N 71°37′23″W
- Area: 1,667 acres (6.75 km^{2})
- Established: 1974
- Governing body: U.S. Fish and Wildlife Service
- Website: Oxbow National Wildlife Refuge

Oxbow National Wildlife Refuge is a property of the United States National Wildlife Refuge (NWR) system located in Middlesex and Worcester counties in Massachusetts. It was founded in 1974.

== Description ==
The Refuge is located in north-central Massachusetts, approximately 35 miles (56 km) northwest of Boston, Massachusetts. The Refuge lies within the towns of Ayer and Shirley in Middlesex County and the towns of Harvard and Lancaster in Worcester County. The Refuge consists of approximately 1,667 acres (6.75 km^{2}) of upland, southern New England floodplain forest, and wetland communities along nearly 8 miles (13 km) of the Nashua River corridor.

== Origins ==
Oxbow National Wildlife Refuge was formed by three land transfers from the U.S. Army's Fort Devens military installation, and a recent purchase of private land in Harvard. Two of the transfers from the Army (May 1974 and February 1988) formed the original 711-acre (2.88 km^{2}) portion of the Refuge located south of Massachusetts Route 2. The third Army transfer occurred in May 1999, and added the 836-acre (3.38 km^{2}) portion of the Refuge that is located north of Route 2. Finally, approximately 120 acres (0.49 km^{2}) were added to the Refuge in April, 2001, with the acquisition of the former Watt Farm property along Still River Depot Road in Harvard.

== Wildlife and habitat ==
The primary purpose for which the Refuge was created is its "...particular value in carrying out the national migratory bird management program".

The Refuge's interspersion of wetland, forested upland and old field habitats is ideally suited for this purpose. The Refuge supports a diverse mix of migratory birds including waterfowl, wading birds, raptors, shorebirds, passerines, as well as resident mammals, reptiles, amphibians, fish and invertebrates. The extensive and regionally significant wetlands occurring on and adjacent to the Oxbow Refuge, including their associated tributary drainages and headwaters, have been listed as a priority for protection under both the North American Waterfowl Management Plan and the Emergency Wetlands Resources Act of 1986. The portion of the Oxbow NWR south of Route 2 lies within the 12,900-acre Central Nashua River Valley Area of Critical Environmental Concern (ACEC) designated by the Massachusetts Secretary of Environmental Affairs, and the portions of the Refuge north of Route 2 are included in the Squannassit ACEC due to the unique environmental characteristics and values of these wildlife habitats.

== Friends group ==
The Refuge has an active friends group, The Friends of Woodlands and Waters, which helps notify people about U.S. Fish & Wildlife Service activities in the Refuge, and also sponsors its own activities in and around the Refuge.
