= Rattlesnake Mountain (Elko County, Nevada) =

Mountain in Nevada, United States

Coordinates: 40°15′09″N 115°36′23″W

Rattlesnake Mountain is a summit in the U.S. state of Nevada. The elevation is 8,524 feet (2,598 m).

Rattlesnake Mountain was so named on account of rattlesnakes near the summit.
