= Northfield Mountain =

Mountain in Massachusetts, United States

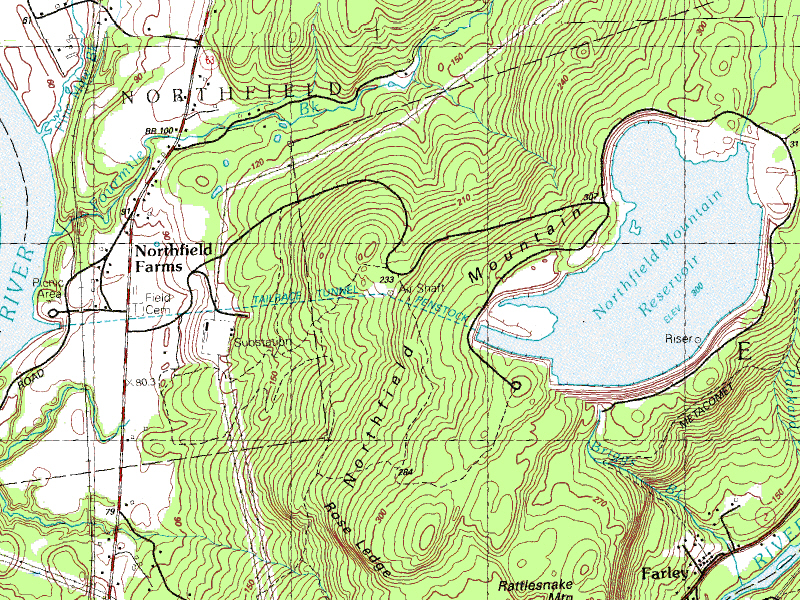
- Map showing ridgeline and pumped-storage hydroelectric reservoir

Highest point
- Elevation: 1,206 ft (368 m)
- Coordinates: 42°36′55″N 72°25′27″W

Geography
- Location: Erving and Northfield, Massachusetts
- Parent range: Bald Hills

Geology
- Rock age: 400 million years
- Mountain type: Metamorphic rock

Climbing
- Easiest route: Metacomet-Monadnock Trail

Northfield Mountain, 1,206 feet (368 m), is a mountain ridge located in Erving and Northfield, Massachusetts. 2.5 miles (4.0 km) long by 1.8 miles (2.9 km) long, the mountain is composed of several distinct peaks and ledges, most notably Rattlesnake Mountain (also known as Farley Ledge) 1,067 feet (325 m), Rose Ledges 1,080 feet (330 m), and Hermit Mountain (the high point). A pumped-storage hydroelectric plant and reservoir occupies the top of the mountain west of the summit.

The 114-mile (183 km) Metacomet-Monadnock Trail crosses the summit ridge of Northfield Mountain; a series of shorter hiking trails, cross country ski trails, a cross-country running course, and rock climbing routes are also located on the mountain and its ledges. Northfield Mountain is located at the confluence of the Connecticut River and Millers River. A waterfall, Briggs Brook Falls, plunges from its southeast side.

== Pumped-storage hydroelectricity facility ==
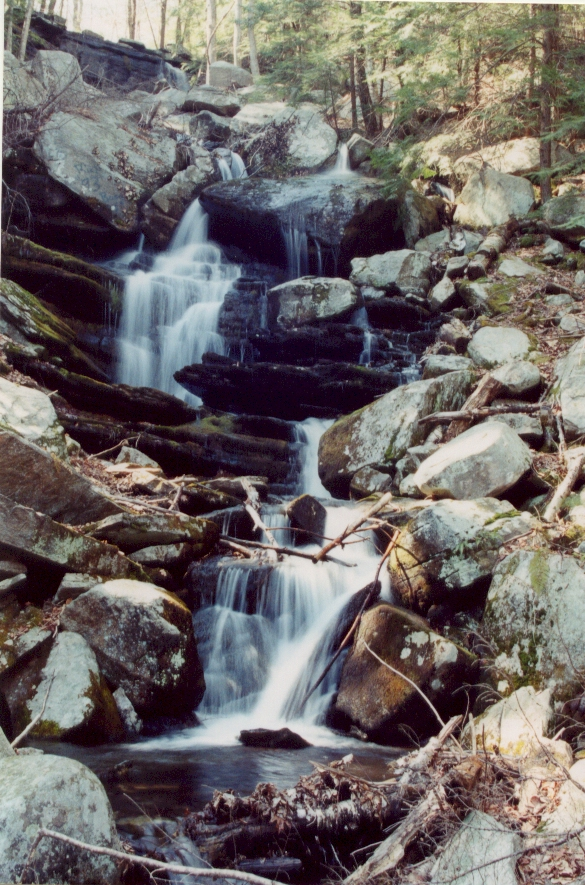
Briggs Brook Falls

Engineering studies began in October 1964, with early site preparation starting three years later. In 1972 its 1,080-megawatt hydroelectric plant became operational as the largest such facility in the world.

== Recreation ==
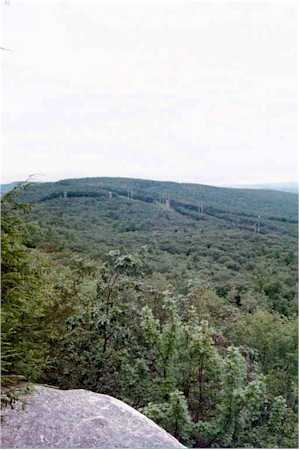
View from Rose Ledge

FirstLight Power Resources also manages recreational resources on the mountain as part of their agreement with the state of Massachusetts. A cross-country ski area is located on the mountain; it includes groomed trails, warming huts, and ski instruction. The 114 mile (183 km) Metacomet-Monadnock Trail traverses the mountain, as do a number of shorter trails. FirstLight also offers camping at nearby Barton Cove, environmental programs, and boat tours of the Connecticut River.

Rose Ledge and Farley Ledges are popular among rock climbers. Farley Ledge has been subject to recent conservation and climbing access initiatives. Hermit Mountain is the site of "Hermit's Castle," a state historic site where John Smith, a local recluse, made his home from 1857 to 1900.

== Geologic history ==
Northfield Mountain's geologic story begins in the late Precambrian period. The ancient Precambrian rocks are more than 600 million years old and are found only in the Western Berkshires of Massachusetts and in the Green Mountains of Vermont.

== See also ==
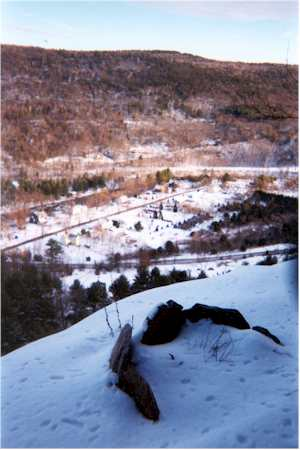
View from Farley Ledges

- Farley Ledges
- Metacomet-Monadnock Trail
