= Middlesex Turnpike (Massachusetts) =

Highway in Massachusetts

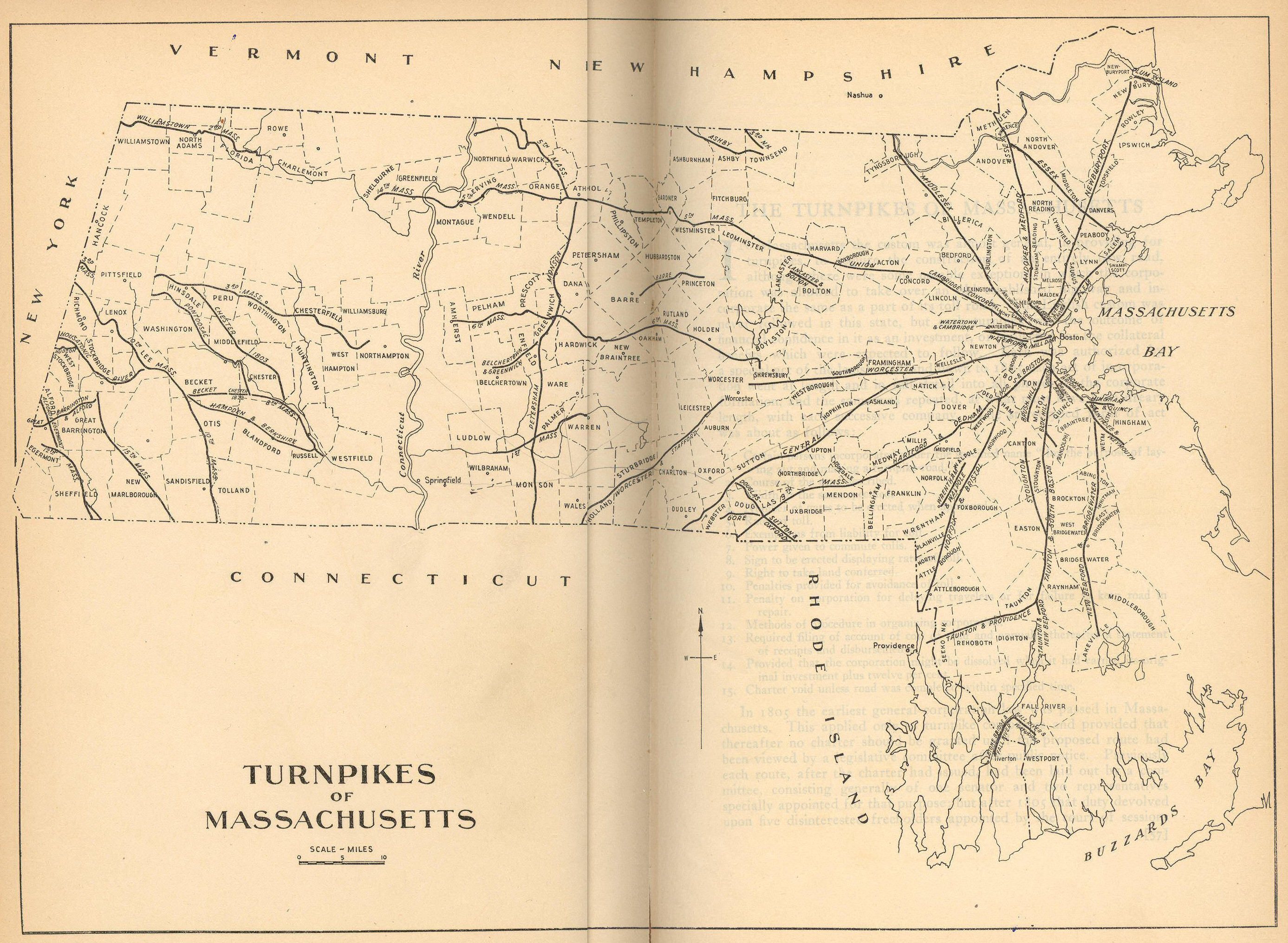
Map of the 19th century turnpikes in Massachusetts

The Middlesex Turnpike was an early turnpike between Cambridge and Tyngsborough, Massachusetts, and the New Hampshire border, where it connected with the Amherst Turnpike and thence Nashua and Claremont, New Hampshire.

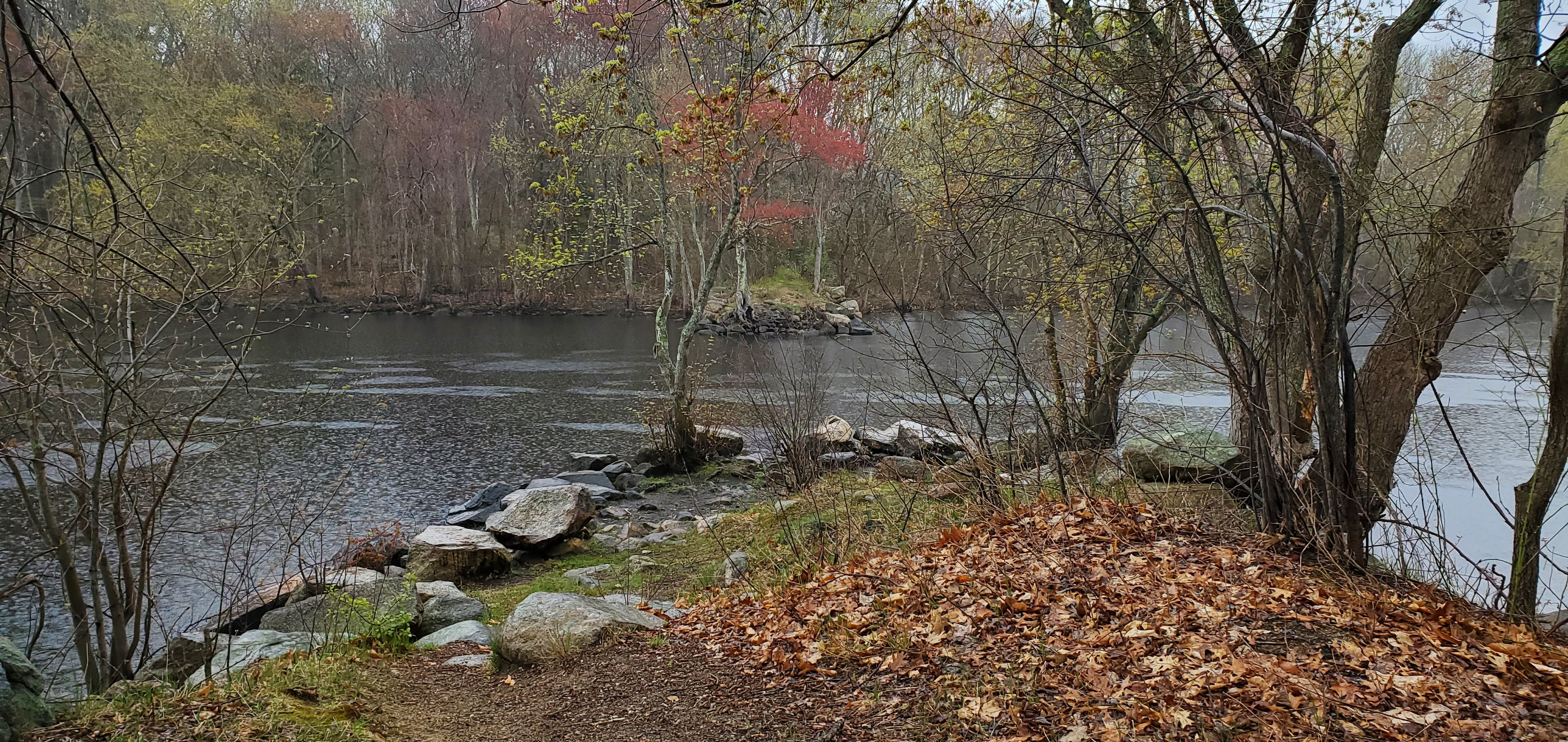
Old Middlesex Turnpike in April 2021 where it used to connect across the Concord River

The turnpike was chartered on June 15, 1805, by the Massachusetts legislature. After an extremely contentious argument about its route, it opened about five years later. The road started near present-day Technology Square in East Cambridge, where it intersected with the Cambridge and Concord Turnpike (now Broadway), headed roughly northwest along what are now Hampshire and Beacon Streets, passed by the 'Foot of the Rocks' in West Cambridge (now along Massachusetts Avenue in Arlington), and onwards to Lexington by today's Westminster and Lowell Streets. From there, it continued through Burlington, Bedford, and Billerica, the section of which is still called the Middlesex Turnpike as far as Concord Road in Billerica (though between 2010 and 2016 the roadway officially named Middlesex Turnpike was diverted from the right of way over a stretch of half a mile or so in Burlington near Bedford Street in order to bypass a residential neighborhood; the old roadway still exists under the name of Middlesex Turnpike Extension and is directly connected to Middlesex Turnpike at the southern end but is cut off from the heavy traffic on the Turnpike at the northern end).

The remainder of the right of way in Billerica is fragmented. The portion between Concord Road and the Concord River had become overgrown with fairly substantial trees, but a portion was recently recleared and paved as a driveway into a new commercial development that is not yet completed. On the north side of the Concord River, a short section now called Old Middlesex Turnpike serves a few blocks in a residential neighborhood, but a gate blocks access to the river. The section between River Street Extension and River Street is substantially overgrown, with the southern end serving as a dirt driveway from River Street into a couple residences. The portion of River Street nearest U.S. Route 3 also follows the original right of way. There are original fragments remaining in the Billerica State Forest, alongside Route 3, and again north and south of Rangeway Road.

From Billerica, the Middlesex Turnpike continued northwest to Chelmsford, and then along the bank of the Merrimack River to Tyngsborough. A small, 1.5-mile (2.4 km) stretch of the turnpike remains in Chelmsford, now known as "Turnpike Road." There is also a short residential street named "Old Middlesex Turnpike Street" that lies on or very near the original right-of-way, and the occasional property line denotes the original route. Its route would have gone through the middle of the Drum Hill Rotary where US 3, Route 4, Drum Hill Road and Old Westford Road all come together, and from there would have followed North Road (Route 4) and Princeton Street (Route 3A) into what is now North Chelmsford's Vinal Square, following modern Route 3A along Tyngsboro Road through North Chelmsford and Middlesex Road through Tyngsboro to Nashua, New Hampshire, where it becomes Daniel Webster Highway. It was about 26 miles (42 km) in length, with four toll gates along the way.

As was the practice of that time, the road was as straight as possible, and thus missed the advantages of passing through economic centers along the way. As its route closely paralleled that of the Middlesex Canal, and later the railroad, it suffered stiff competition for both freight and passenger traffic. As a result, at some point during the early to mid 1800s, the section that used to cross the Concord River between Concord Road (Billerica) and Mill Road (Chelmsford) was fenced off and was no longer used due to the rough terrain. The road was thus never particularly profitable. Its charter was repealed in 1841, and it became a free road in 1846.

U.S. Route 3, the expressway largely built in the 1950s from Burlington to Tyngsboro, is substantially parallel to the Middlesex Turnpike.

== Improvement Project ==
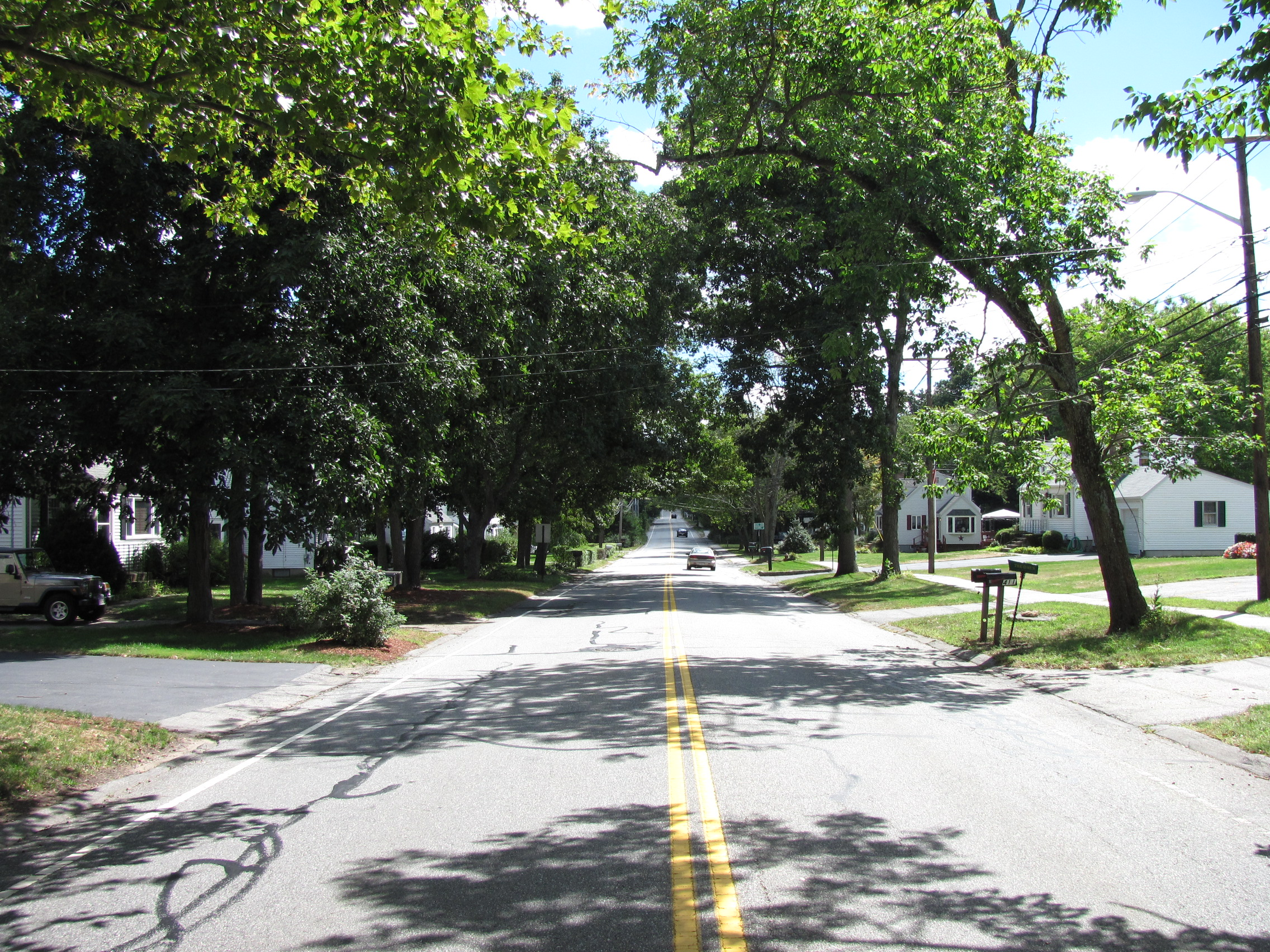
Middlesex Turnpike in Billerica

The Massachusetts Department of Transportation is upgrading the Middlesex Turnpike in cooperation with the Towns of Burlington, Bedford and Billerica based on concept plans developed in the 1980s. Early work included Middlesex Turnpike in Burlington (up to the start of Network Drive) and the creation of Network Drive. "Phase 1" of the current work was the widening of Crosby Drive. Phase 1 was Completed in 2007.

Phase 2 began in Burlington at Route 62 and Network Drive (now Middlesex Turnpike) and stretches into Bedford just north of Crosby Drive. Total cost of Phase 2 was expected to be $13 Million+. Construction on Phase 2 began in July 2010 and ended in 2016. The contractor for Phase 2 was Newport Construction Corporation of Nashua New Hampshire. With the completion of Phase 2, the main flow of traffic uses a new segment of road (built on the Mitre fields) to bypass a "thickly settled" (residential) section of the Middlesex Turnpike located between Terrace Hall Road and the Bedford line in Burlington.

Billerica is planning that phase 3 become a multi-modal corridor—a green road plus 3 modes, including transit, bike lanes and sidewalks for pedestrians. The work begins between Crosby Dr and the Shawsheen River and continues north to between Manning Rd and the Mobil station/Nutting Lake post office. The road will be widened to two through lanes in each direction with center left turn lanes where appropriate. Lights will be upgraded at Lexington St and at Albion Dr and added at Oak Park Dr, Suburban Park Dr, and Manning Rd. The winning bid was Barletta Heavy Division, Inc for $34,475,000, 10% above estimate). Survey work began in late 2017 and full construction start is April 30, 2018. The project, and specifically the $35 million transportation improvement project in Bedford and Billerica, as of 2019 was scheduled to be completed in 2023.

== See also ==
- 19th century turnpikes in Massachusetts
