= Erving State Forest =

Protected area in Massachusetts, United States

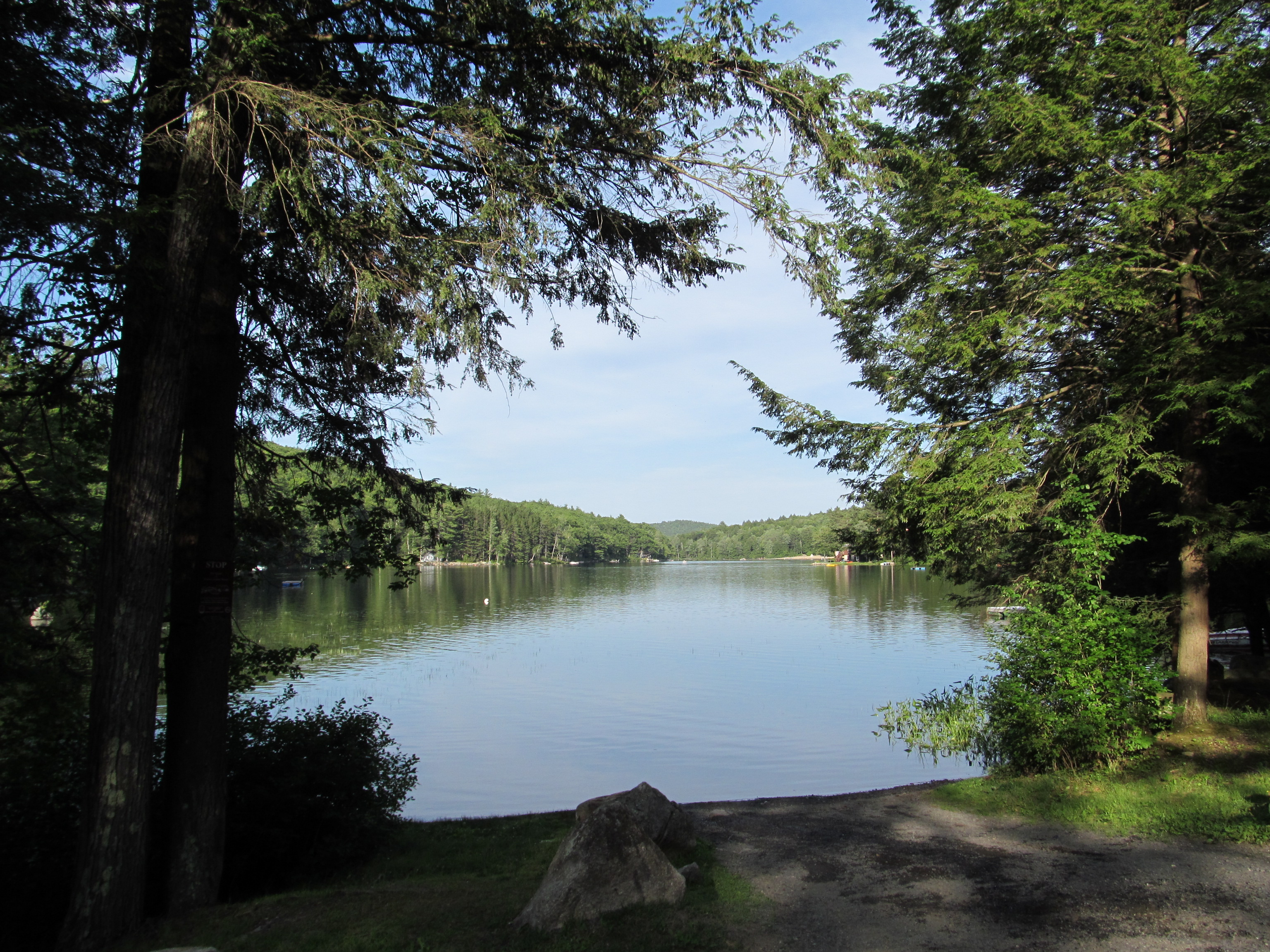
- Laurel Lake

- Location within Massachusetts Location within the United States
- Location: Erving, Warwick and Orange, Massachusetts, United States
- Coordinates: 42°37′19″N 72°22′19″W
- Area: 2,422 acres (980 ha)
- Elevation: 764 ft (233 m)
- Established: 1920
- Administrator: Massachusetts Department of Conservation and Recreation
- Website: Official website

Erving State Forest is a publicly owned forest with recreational features located north of the Millers River in the towns of Erving, Warwick, and Orange, Massachusetts. The property is centered on Laurel Lake, a 51-acre (21 ha) body of water that has been a popular recreational destination since the 1930s. The forest's network of roads and hiking trails were largely created by the Civilian Conservation Corps. The forest is managed by the Department of Conservation and Recreation.

== History ==
Erving State Forest saw its genesis in 1920 following the passage of legislation enabling the state to purchase new forest lands; at that time it was known as Laurel Lake Forest. The Civilian Conservation Corps worked at Laurel Lake from 1933 to 1937, constructing a beach, campground, picnic area, and new dam among other features. The forest headquarters were a later addition, built in the 1950s.

== Physical properties ==
The property is largely wooded and hilly and covers a central area roughly 2 1/2 by 2 1/2 miles wide in central Massachusetts north of the Quabbin Reservoir. It also includes nearby satellite property fragments. Laurel Lake, located in the center of the property, is approximately 1/4 mile wide (N-S) by 1 mile long (E-W) and has approximately 35 houses, the majority of which lie on the northern shore. The lake is so named because of the abundance of mountain laurel flowers that border it.

== Flora and fauna ==
Laurel Lake is home to large mouth bass, rainbow trout, brook trout, yellow perch, pickerel, eel, and blue gill, snapping and painted turtles, heron, beaver, eastern newt, bullfrog, and leopard frog. The forest itself is home to many animals including black bear, white tail deer, porcupine, coyote, fox, raccoon, and ground squirrel. Aside from the mountain laurel, other common flowers in Erving State Forest include pitcher plants, the daylily variety Hemerocallis fulva (orange daylily), and painted trillium.

== Activities and amenities ==
The state forest is open to hiking, swimming, cross-country skiing, snowshoeing, fishing, and seasonal hunting. Laurel Lake has a boat ramp, beach and seasonal campground. Laurel Trail, located behind the ranger station at Laurel Lake beach, offers a view of Mount Monadnock. The 110-mile Metacomet-Monadnock Trail passes through a western parcel of the state forest. Trails are used for snowmobiling and four wheeling.
