= Farley Ledges =

Mountain in Massachusetts, United States

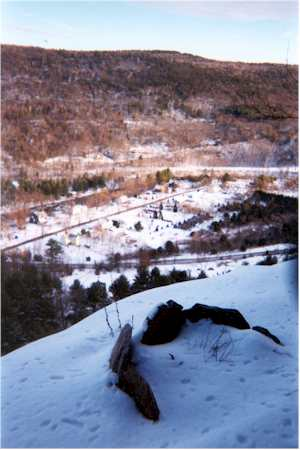
- View from top of ledges

Highest point
- Elevation: 1,067 ft (325 m)
- Coordinates: 42°35′50″N 72°26′47″W

Geography
- Location: Erving
- Parent range: Northfield Mountain

Geology
- Rock age: 400 million years
- Mountain type: Metamorphic rock

Climbing
- Easiest route: Metacomet-Monadnock Trail + rock climbing access trail

Farley Ledges, 1,067 feet (325 m) is a bluff knoll located on the southeast side of Northfield Mountain in eastern Franklin County, Massachusetts. The ledge is notable for its extensive rock climbing ascents; it rises 700 feet (210 m) above the small village of Farley (part of Erving, Massachusetts) and has been used by rock climbers since the 1930s. The Western Massachusetts Climbers Coalition has been active in purchasing land to preserve access to the mountain; 2007 purchases included a parcel along Route 2 developed into a trailhead with a parking lot and access corridor to the ledges. The 110-mile (180 km) Metacomet-Monadnock Trail ascends the wooded north side of the ledges where Briggs Brook Falls tumbles from the ridgecrest; a marked rock climbing access loop trail departs from the Metacomet-Monadnock Trail to traverse both the summit of the ledges and the extensive boulder field beneath.

Climbing access at Farley is an ongoing concern and the crag has faced closures by landowners in the past. Landowners have requested that no online or printed guides containing climbing route descriptions or grades are published. As a result, climbing at Farley Ledges is a social affair for new climbers who must seek out experienced locals for climbing information.

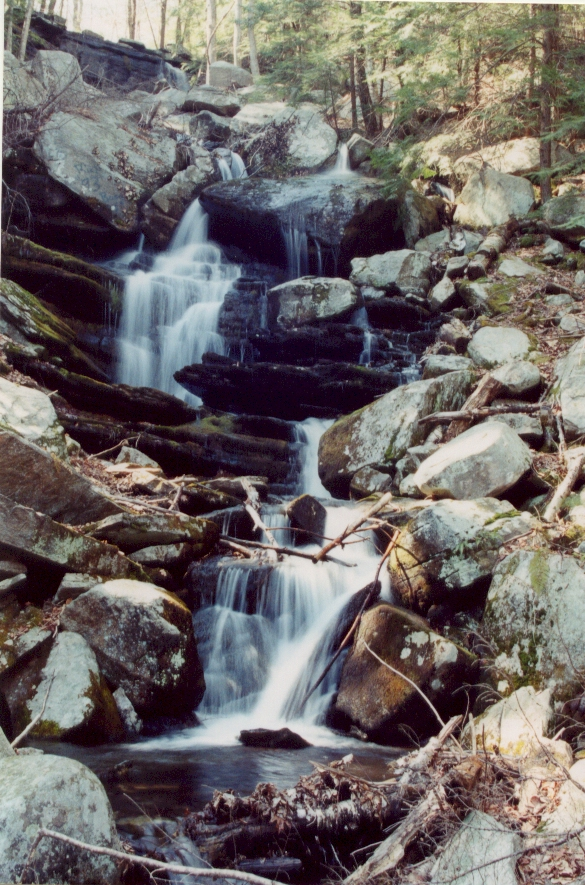
Briggs Brook Falls

== See also ==
- Northfield Mountain
- Metacomet-Monadnock Trail
