= Cambridge and Concord Turnpike =

Highway in Massachusetts

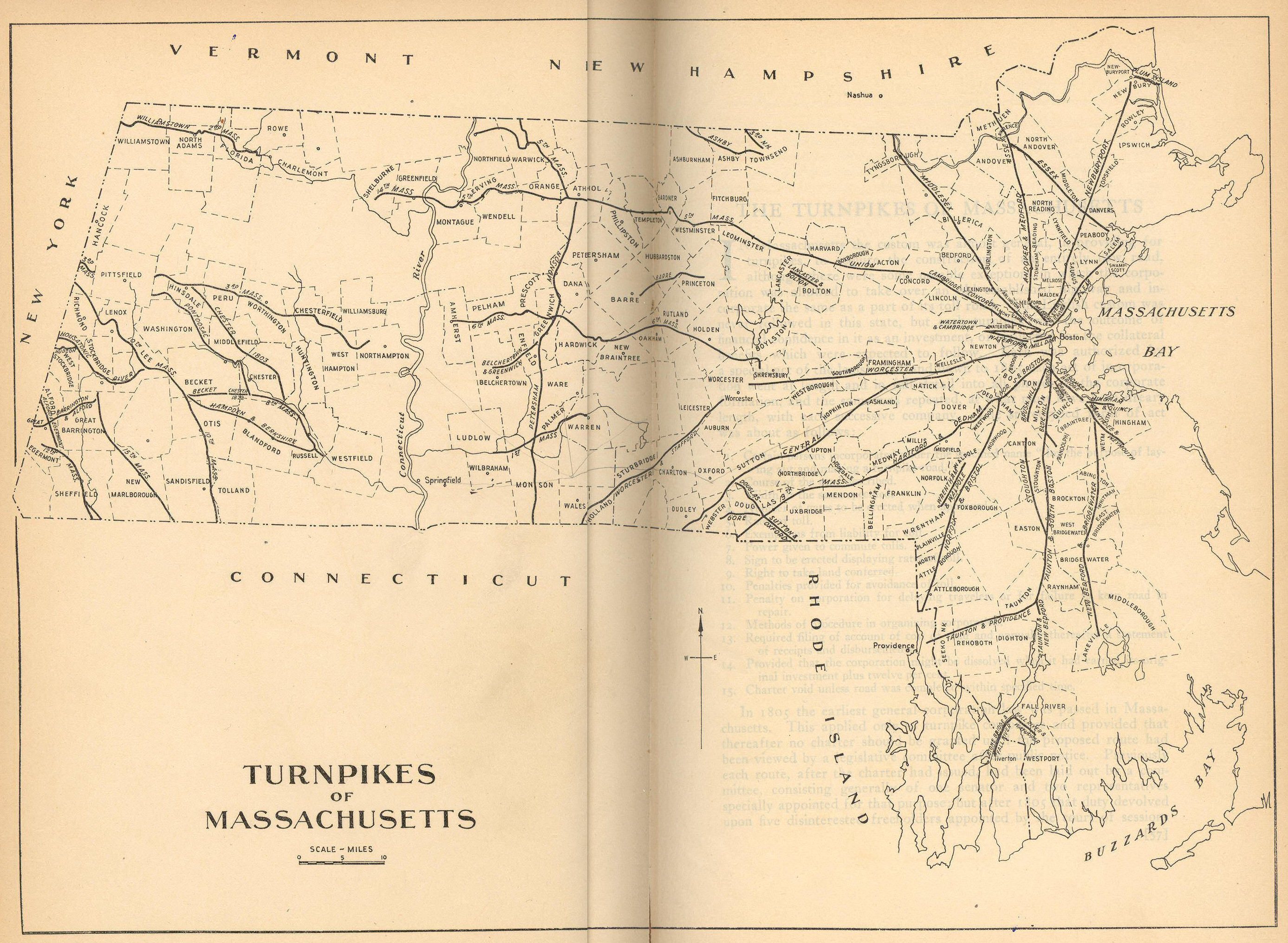
1919 map of the turnpikes in Massachusetts

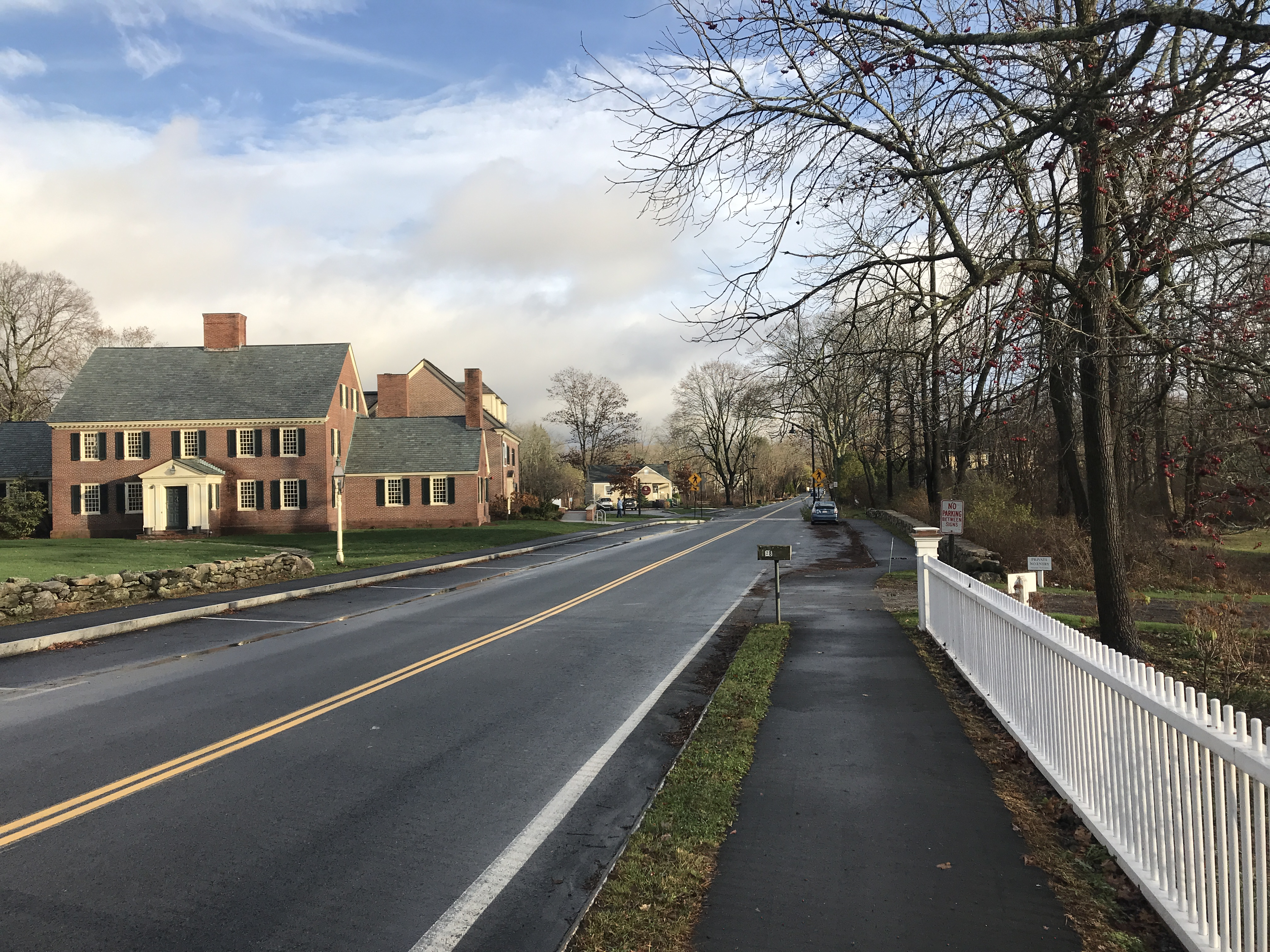
Cambridge Turnpike in Concord, Massachusetts

The Cambridge and Concord Turnpike was an early turnpike between Cambridge and Concord, Massachusetts. Portions have been incorporated into today's Massachusetts Route 2; the remainder forms other major local roads.

== Route description ==
The turnpike began at the western end of the West Boston Bridge in Cambridgeport (now Kendall Square). From there it proceeded along today's Broadway to Mechanics Square, where it intersected with the Middlesex Turnpike (now Hampshire Street), then continued to the Cambridge Common, skirting Harvard College by 90 feet (27 m) as required by law, and from there proceeded northwest past Fresh Pond to Belmont Center, and then onwards to Lincoln by the route now known as Concord Avenue. (Today's sharp turn after crossing Pleasant Street in Belmont Center was a revision to the original turnpike, as its original path directly up the hill ahead proved too difficult for transportation. The earlier route still exists as Centre Ave.) The turnpike continued through Lincoln in a direct line to Concord Center. Today one section forms part of Route 2 (from Route 128 to Bypass Road); the other continues into Concord as Cambridge Turnpike.

== History ==
The Cambridge and Concord Turnpike Corporation was established on March 7–8, 1803, by act of the Massachusetts legislature. In 1805-06 most of the turnpike was constructed in very nearly a straight line from Cambridge to Concord Center, despite the needless difficulties this entailed with steep hills along the selected path. (After construction, the route was somewhat modified to improve its practicality.) Much of the road opened for business in February 1807, though the eastern segment within Cambridge was not completed until circa 1812.

Two tollgates were erected on the turnpike: one about 0.5 miles (0.80 km) west of Fresh Pond, and the other in Lincoln. No gates were erected within Cambridge, as a result of a lawsuit. The road's width varied from 50 feet (15 m) over much of its route to as much as 100 feet (30 m) at today's Broadway.

The turnpike was not an economic success, and in May 1829 it was converted to a public highway. Its poor profits were probably due to the uncompromising "straight line" route, which both impeded traffic by needless steep hills and bypassed the important town of Lexington.

== See also ==
- 19th-century turnpikes in Massachusetts
