= Rattlesnake Point (United States) =

Mountain in Texas, United States

- Location within Texas

Highest point
- Elevation: 1,979 ft (603 m)
- Coordinates: 31.2662°N 99.5347°W

Geography
- Location: Texas, USA

Rattlesnake Point is a summit located in the Brady Mountains in central Texas. It is located entirely in McCulloch County.
