= Erving, Massachusetts =

- Town
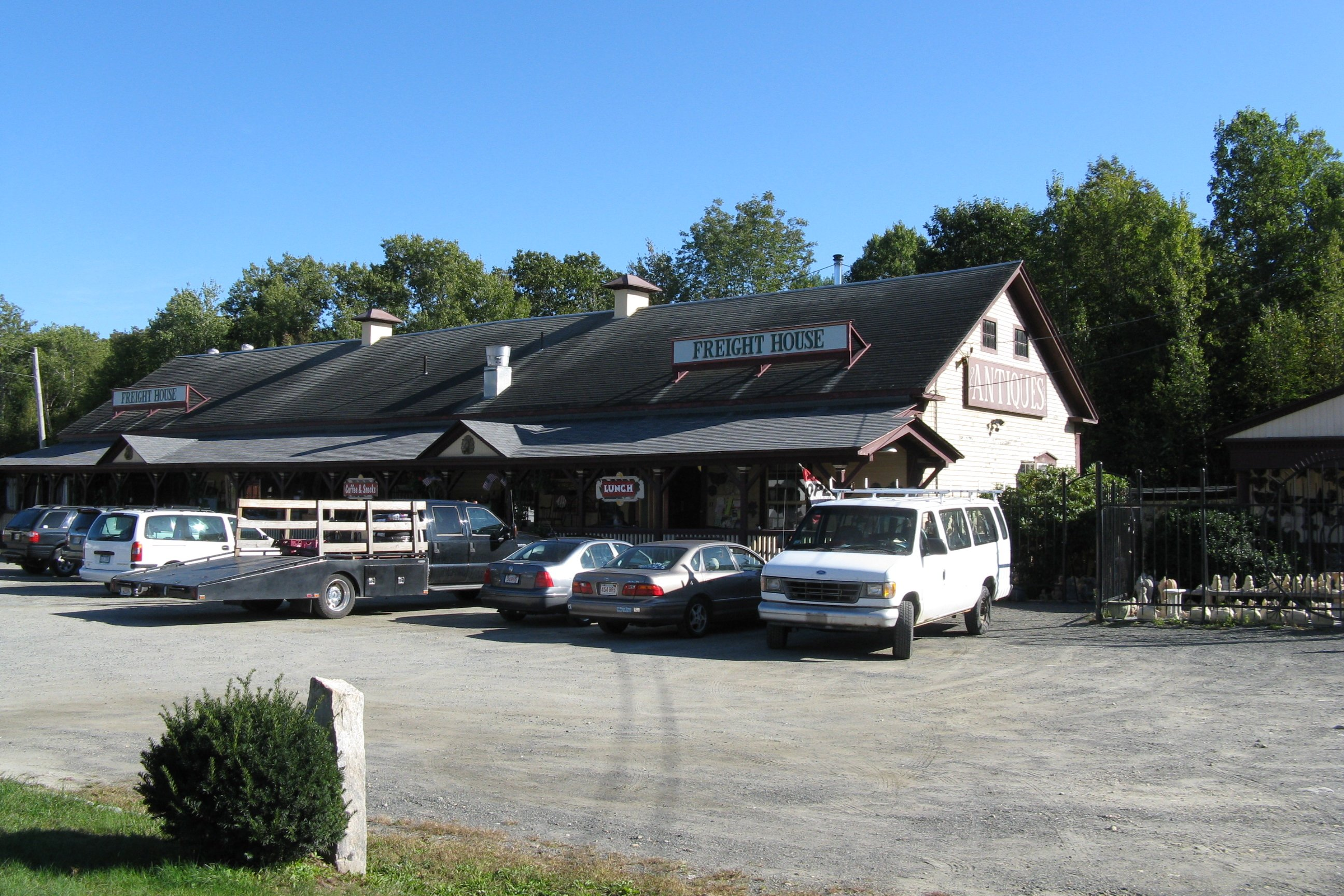
- Freight House Antiques

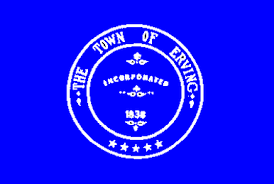
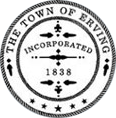
- Flag Seal

- Location in Franklin County in Massachusetts
- Coordinates: 42°36′0″N 72°23′55″W
- Country: United States
- State: Massachusetts
- County: Franklin
- Settled: 1801
- Incorporated: 1838

Government
  - Type: Open town meeting

Area
  - Total: 14.4 sq mi (37.3 km^{2})
  - Land: 13.9 sq mi (35.9 km^{2})
  - Water: 0.50 sq mi (1.3 km^{2})
- Elevation: 515 ft (157 m)

Population (2020)
  - Total: 1,665
  - Density: 120/sq mi (46.4/km^{2})
- Time zone: UTC−5 (Eastern)
  - Summer (DST): UTC−4 (Eastern)
- ZIP Code: 01344
- Area code: 413
- FIPS code: 25-21780
- GNIS feature ID: 0618163
- Website: www.erving-ma.gov

Erving is a town in Franklin County, Massachusetts, United States. The population was 1,665 at the 2020 census. Erving shares the census-designated place of Millers Falls with Montague. It is part of the Springfield, Massachusetts metropolitan statistical area.

== History ==
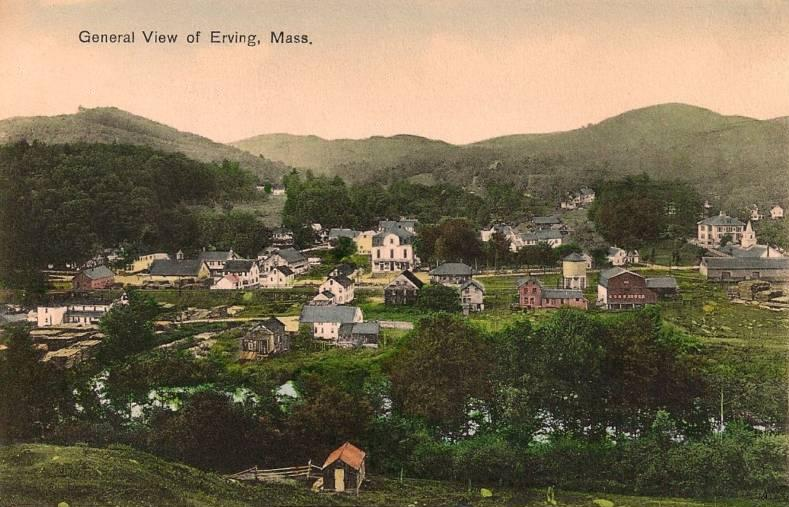
General view in 1908

Erving is located along the Mohawk Trail. The area was part of the Pocomtuc Indian Nation, whose villages included Squawkeag in what is now Northfield, and Peskeompscut in what is now Turners Falls. Eventually, most of the native population was displaced and/or sold into slavery as a result of King Philip's War and a series of massacres of local Indian villages.

Subsequently, Erving was first settled by white settlers in 1801 and officially incorporated—it being nearly the last unincorporated land in Massachusetts—in 1838. What is now Erving was once the farm of John Erving, the first colonial in the area. Noted in the 19th century for timber and grazing, the town had seven sawmills, two chair factories, one pail factory, one children's carriage factory, and one bit-brace factory. Large numbers of railroad ties and telegraph poles were cut in the abundant forests here, as many as 1,495,000 in one year. Today, Erving has a school, a police and fire department, public library, several small stores and restaurants. The biggest employer in town is Erving Industries, a paper mill with history to Holyoke, Massachusetts - 'Paper City era'.

== Geography ==
According to the United States Census Bureau, the town has a total area of 14.4 square miles (37 km^{2}), of which 13.9 square miles (36 km^{2}) is land and 0.5 square miles (1.3 km^{2}) (3.61%) is water. The Millers River, a tributary of the Connecticut River, passes through the town.

The terrain of Erving is hilly and rugged; most of the developed area of the town is located along the river. Northfield Mountain and its peaks occupy much of the northern two-thirds of the town. The mountain is the location of a pumped storage hydroelectric facility.

Erving is situated along Route 2, a heavily traveled state highway.

=== Outdoor recreation ===
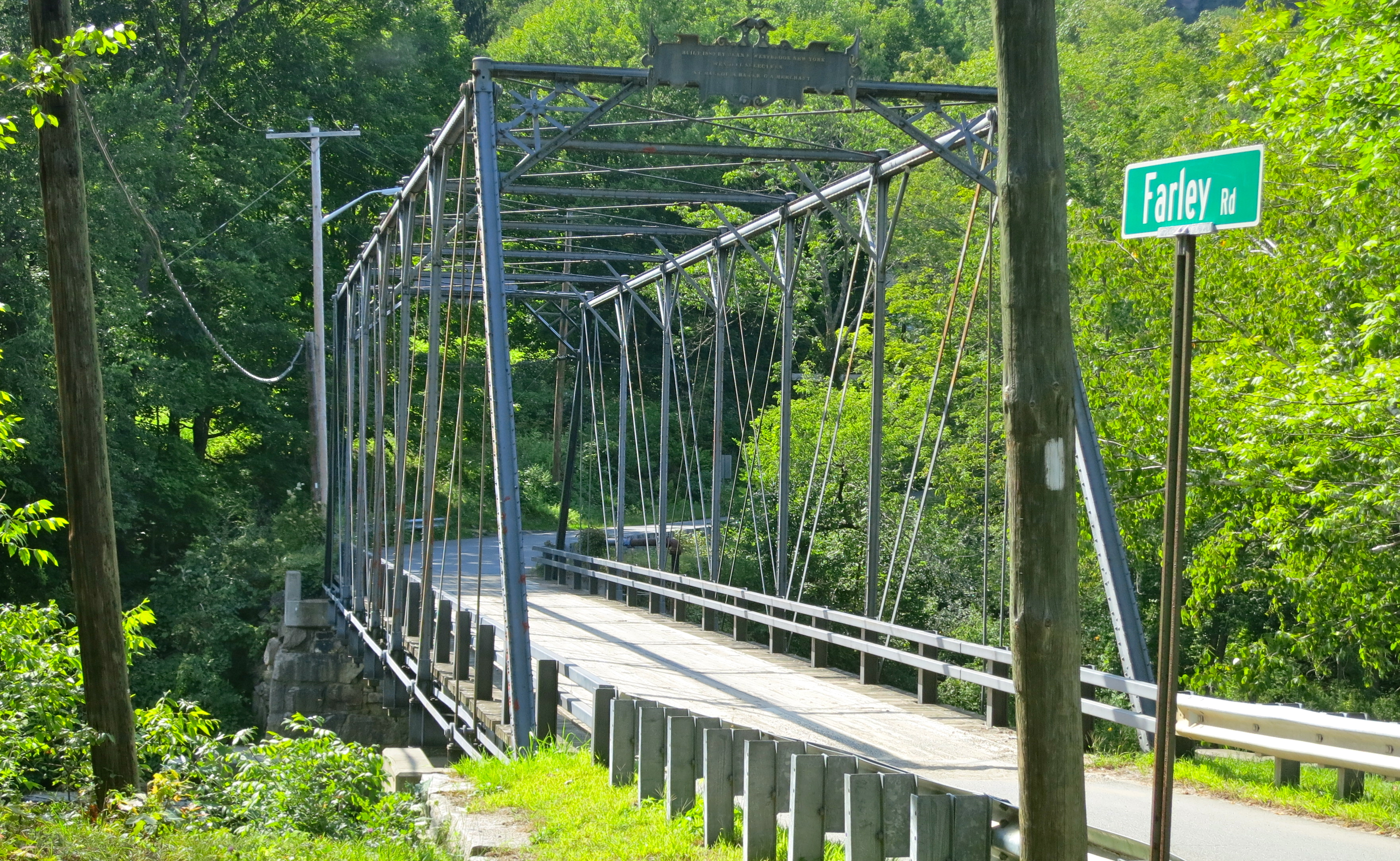
This single lane truss bridge spanning the Millers River was built in 1889 and is located a tenth of a mile south of Route 2 on Farley Road

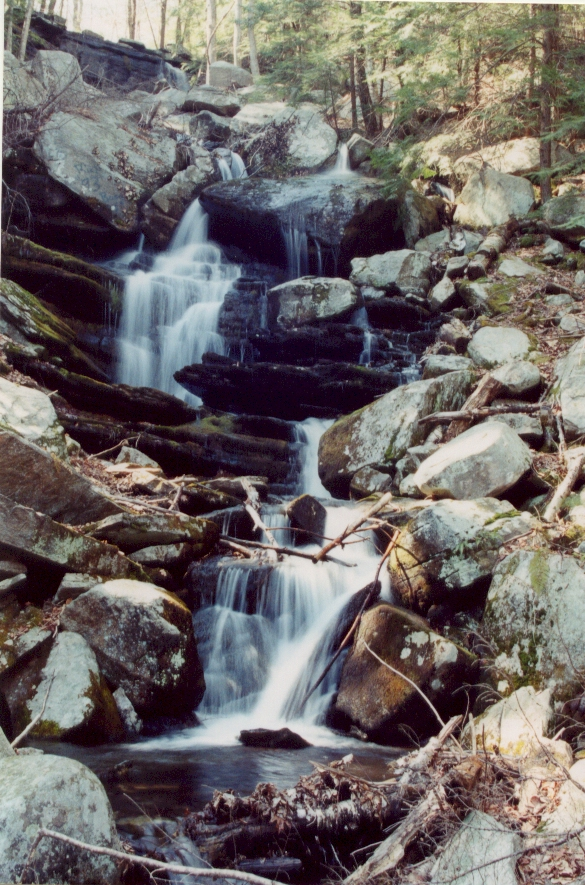
Briggs Brook Falls is located along the Metacomet-Monadnock Trail

The town is home to a number of topographic features popular among outdoor recreation enthusiasts. Erving State Forest has recreation and seasonal camping facilities. The Millers River is used for fishing and whitewater kayaking. Northfield Mountain hosts cross country ski trails, hiking trails, and rock climbing ascents, including the 114 mile (183 km) Metacomet-Monadnock Trail and the Farley Ledges rock climbing area.

== Demographics ==
Historical population
| Year | Pop. | ±% |
|---|---|---|
| 1850 | 449 | — |
| 1860 | 527 | +17.4% |
| 1870 | 579 | +9.9% |
| 1880 | 872 | +50.6% |
| 1890 | 972 | +11.5% |
| 1900 | 973 | +0.1% |
| 1910 | 1,148 | +18.0% |
| 1920 | 1,295 | +12.8% |
| 1930 | 1,263 | −2.5% |
| 1940 | 1,328 | +5.1% |
| 1950 | 1,322 | −0.5% |
| 1960 | 1,272 | −3.8% |
| 1970 | 1,260 | −0.9% |
| 1980 | 1,326 | +5.2% |
| 1990 | 1,372 | +3.5% |
| 2000 | 1,467 | +6.9% |
| 2010 | 1,800 | +22.7% |
| 2020 | 1,665 | −7.5% |
| 2022* | 1,667 | +0.1% |
* = population estimate. Source: United States census records and Population Estimates Program data.

As of the census of 2000, there were 1,467 people, 600 households, and 400 families residing in the town. The population density was 105.7 inhabitants per square mile (40.8/km^{2}). There were 630 housing units at an average density of 45.4 per square mile (17.5/km^{2}). The racial makeup of the town was 96.80% White, 0.14% African American, 0.82% Native American, 0.14% Asian, 0.41% from other races, and 1.70% from two or more races. Hispanic or Latino of any race were 0.89% of the population.

There were 600 households, out of which 29.2% had children under the age of 18 living with them, 53.3% were married couples living together, 8.0% had a female householder with no husband present, and 33.3% were non-families. 26.7% of all households were made up of individuals, and 12.2% had someone living alone who was 65 years of age or older. The average household size was 2.45 and the average family size was 2.94.

In the town, the population was spread out, with 22.9% under the age of 18, 6.5% from 18 to 24, 30.5% from 25 to 44, 26.3% from 45 to 64, and 13.8% who were 65 years of age or older. The median age was 39 years. For every 100 females, there were 101.2 males. For every 100 females age 18 and over, there were 99.1 males.

The median income for a household in the town was $40,039, and the median income for a family was $47,212. Males had a median income of $35,511 versus $26,711 for females. The per capita income for the town was $19,107. About 4.7% of families and 6.7% of the population were below the poverty line, including 8.5% of those under age 18 and 5.1% of those age 65 or over.

== Education ==
Erving is home to one elementary school, the Erving Elementary School. Middle/High School students attend Great Falls Middle School, and Turners Falls High School in Montague.
