= Mount Grace (disambiguation) =

Mount Grace is a mountain in north central Massachusetts.

Mount Grace may also refer to:

- Mount Grace (Chugach Mountains), a summit in Alaska
- Mount Grace Land Conservation Trust, Massachusetts
- Mount Grace Priory, Yorkshire, England, a former Carthusian monastery
- Mount Grace School, Potters Bar, Hertfordshire, England
- Mount Grace State Forest, Massachusetts
