= HMS Racer =

Six ships of the Royal Navy have borne the name HMS Racer:

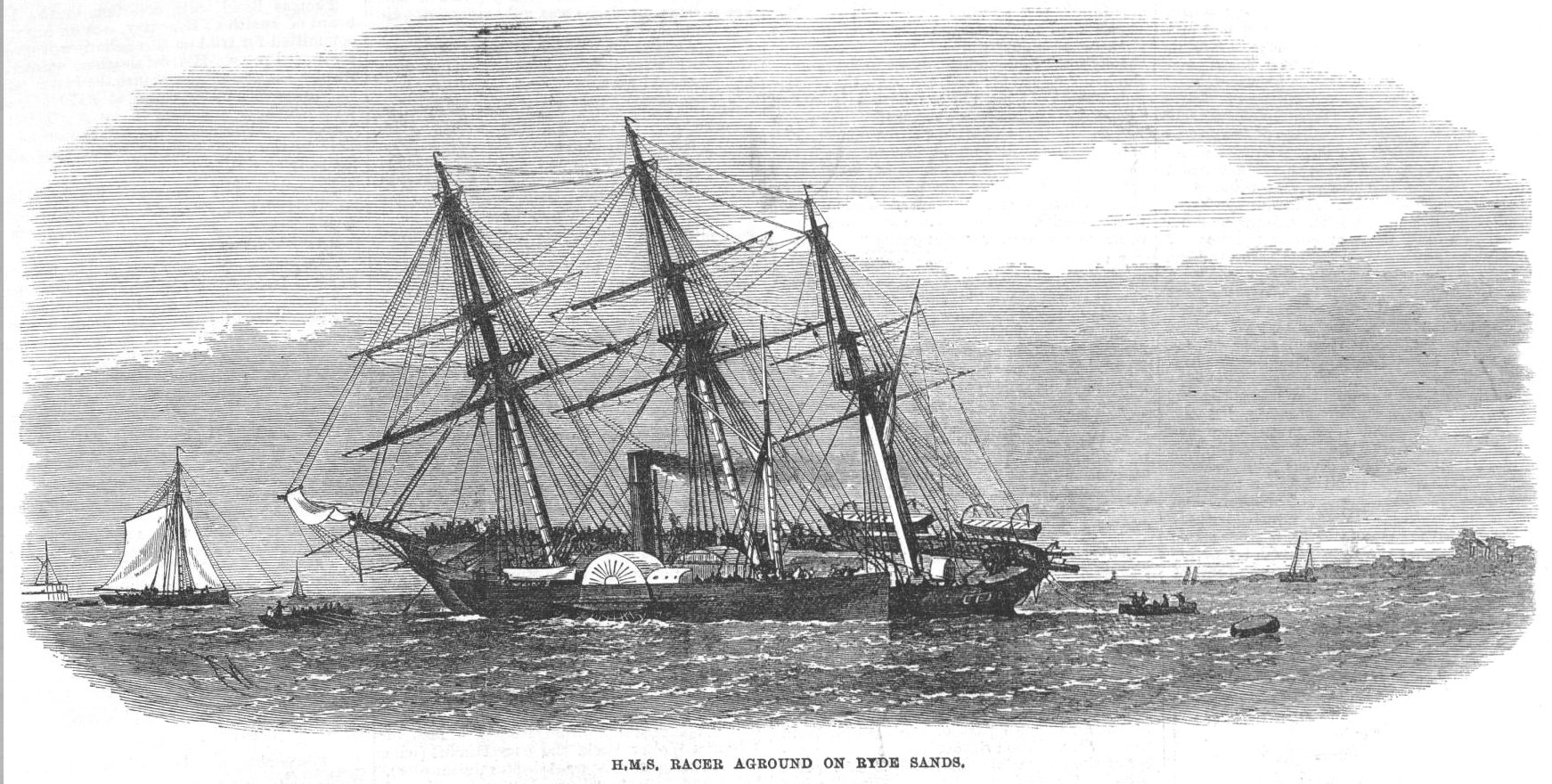
HMS Racer (1857) aground on Ryde Sands on 11 September 1871

- HMS Racer (1810) was a 12-gun Decoy-class cutter launched in April 1810. She stranded on the French coast in October, which enabled the French to capture her.
- HMS Racer (1812) was a 12-gun schooner, formerly the American Independence. Medusa captured her in 1812. Racer was wrecked in the Florida Straits in 1814.
- HMS Racer (1818) was a 6-gun cutter launched in 1818, and ordered to be sold in 1830.
- HMS Racer (1833) was a 16-gun brig-sloop launched in 1833 and sold in 1852.
- HMS Racer (1857), a Racer-class sloop, a wood screw sloop launched in 1857 and broken up in 1876.
- HMS Racer (1884) was a Mariner-class composite screw gunvessel launched in 1884. She was re-classified as a sloop in 1884, used as a salvage vessel from 1917 and was sold in 1928.

== See also ==
- HMS Shelburne (1813), built as American schooner Racer
