= List of shipwrecks in March 1824 =

The list of shipwrecks in March 1824 includes some ships sunk, foundered, grounded, or otherwise lost during March 1824.

== 1 March ==
List of shipwrecks: 1 March 1824
| Ship | State | Description |
|---|---|---|
| Friends | United Kingdom | The ship was driven ashore between Blackburn and Sea Bank. She was on a voyage from Stranraer, Wigtownshire to Ayr. |
| Ocean | United Kingdom | The ship was driven ashore and wrecked on Skagen, Denmark. She was on a voyage from Newcastle upon Tyne, Northumberland to Memel, Prussia. |
| Tamar | United Kingdom | The ship departed from Waterford for Liverpool, Lancashire. She subsequently foundered in the Irish Sea with the loss of all hands on or before 6 March. |

== 2 March ==
List of shipwrecks: 2 March 1824
| Ship | State | Description |
|---|---|---|
| Albion | United Kingdom | The ship was driven ashore and wrecked at Happisburgh, Norfolk. Her crew were rescued. She was on a voyage from Boston, Lincolnshire to London. |
| Alexander | United Kingdom | The sloop was wrecked on the Haisborough Sands, in the North Sea off the coast of Norfolk. Her crew were rescued. She was on a voyage from Hull, Yorkshire to London. |
| Ann | United Kingdom | The ship was driven ashore at Trimingham, Norfolk. Her crew were rescued. She was on a voyage from Boston to London. |
| Azores | United Kingdom | The ship was lost off Trinidad, Cuba. Her crew were rescued. She was on a voyage from Jamaica to Jersey, Channel Islands. |
| Charles | Netherlands | The ship was driven onto the Millhouse Rocks, in Liverpool Bay and was abandoned by all bar her captain and mate. She was on a voyage from Antwerp to Liverpool. Lancashire, United Kingdom. Charles was later refloated and taken in to Liverpool. |
| Jason | United Kingdom | The sloop foundered in the North Sea. Her crew were rescued by Thames (United Kingdom). |
| Sisters | United Kingdom | The ship was driven ashore crewless and wrecked near Bridlington, Yorkshire. She was on a voyage from Glasgow, Renfrewshire to London. |
| Thomas and Hannah | United Kingdom | The ship capsized in the English Channel off Beachy Head, Sussex during a squall. Her crew were rescued. She was on a voyage from Chichester, Sussex to Rye, Sussex. |
| Waterloo | United Kingdom | The ship was driven ashore and wrecked at Caister-on-Sea, Norfolk. Her crew were rescued. She was on a voyage from Selby, Yorkshire to Norwich, Norfolk. |

== 3 March ==
List of shipwrecks: 3 March 1824
| Ship | State | Description |
|---|---|---|
| Albion | United Kingdom | The ship was driven ashore near Mundesley, Norfolk. She was on a voyage from Boston, Lincolnshire to London. |
| Alice | United Kingdom | The ship collided with Harriet (United Kingdom) in The Downs. She was then driven ashore and wrecked at Kingsdown, Kent with the loss of three of her crew. Alice was on a voyage from London to Jamaica. |
| Angelica | France | The ship was driven ashore at Les Sables d'Olonne, Vendée. She was on a voyage from Ceará, Brazil to Havre de Grâce, Seine Maritime. |
| Ann | United Kingdom | The ship was driven ashore near Mundesley. She was on a voyage from Boston to London. |
| Ariel | United Kingdom | The brig was driven ashore at Great Yarmouth, Norfolk. She was on a voyage from London to South Shields, County Durham. |
| Baltic | United Kingdom | The ship was driven ashore and wrecked at "Mullenhead", County Londonderry with the loss of all hands. She was on a voyage from Sligo to Greenock, Renfrewshire. |
| Barbara | United Kingdom | The ship was driven ashore and wrecked at Coatham, Yorkshire. She was on a voyage from Perth to London. |
| Beaver | United States | The schooner was driven ashore and wrecked at Warwick, Massachusetts. She was on a voyage from Surinam to Providence, Rhode Island. |
| Clingland | United Kingdom | The brig was driven ashore at Gorleston, Suffolk. her crew were rescued. She was on a voyage from London to York. |
| Colville | United Kingdom | The ship was abandoned on the Sunk Sand, in the North Sea off Harwich, Essex with the loss of a crew member. Survivors were rescued by John (United Kingdom). Colville was on a voyage from King's Lynn, Norfolk to London. She was subsequently taken in to Margate, Kent. |
| Delight | United Kingdom | The ship was driven ashore at Cleethorpes, Lincolnshire. She was on a voyage from Berwick-upon-Tweed, Northumberland to Hull, Yorkshire. |
| Dependent | United States | The schooner was driven ashore and wrecked near the West Quoddy Head Lighthouse, Nova Scotia, British North America. |
| Diligent | United Kingdom | The ship was lost at Aberavon, Glamorgan. She was on a voyage from São Miguel, Azores, Portugal to London. |
| HMS Dwarf | United Kingdom | The cutter was driven ashore and wrecked at Kingstown, County Dublin with the loss of a crew member. |
| Eolus | United States | The ship was wrecked on Eleuthera. She was on a voyage from Morlaix, Finistère, France to Mobile, Alabama. |
| George | United Kingdom | The ship was driven ashore at Ramsgate, Kent. She was on a voyage from Leith, Lothian to Plymouth, Devon. George was refloated and taken in to Ramsgate. |
| Goodintent | United Kingdom | The ship was driven ashore and damaged at Sheerness, Kent. She was later refloated. |
| Hoffnung | Danzig | The ship was driven ashore and wrecked near Wainfleet, Lincolnshire. Her crew were rescued. She was on a voyage from Hull to Danzig. |
| James and Ann | United Kingdom | The Humber Keel was driven ashore and wrecked at Great Yarmouth. She was on a voyage from London to Hull. |
| Jane | United Kingdom | The ship ran aground on the Northern Burrows Sandbank, in the Bristol Channel off Bideford, Devon. Her crew were rescued. She was on a voyage from Dundalk, County Louth to Southampton, Hampshire. |
| Janet | United Kingdom | The sloop was wrecked off Howth, County Dublin. Her crew survived. |
| Johns | United Kingdom | The brig was driven ashore at Great Yarmouth. She was on a voyage from Rochester, Kent to South Shields. |
| Magdalene | Sweden | The ship was driven ashore and wrecked near Calais. |
| Malvina | United Kingdom | The brig was driven ashore at Great Yarmouth. She was on a voyage from London to South Shields. |
| Mayflower | United Kingdom | The ship was driven ashore at Breaksea Point, Glamorgan. She was on a voyage from Youghal, County Cork to Bristol, Gloucestershire. |
| Pomona | United Kingdom | The ship was wrecked in Cardigan Bay. Her crew were rescued. She was on a voyage from Dublin to Chepstow, Monmouthshire. |
| Rufus King | United States | The ship struck the Dove Bank, in Liverpool Bay. She was taken in to Hoylake, Lancashire, United Kingdom nin a severely damaged condition. Rufus King was on a voyage from New Orleans, Louisiana to Liverpool, Lancashire. |
| Union | United Kingdom | The ship was driven ashore and wrecked at "Porthman", Cornwall. Her crew were rescued. She was on a voyage from Dublin to King's Lynn, Norfolk. |

== 4 March ==
List of shipwrecks: 4 March 1824
| Ship | State | Description |
|---|---|---|
| Industry | United Kingdom | The ship was driven ashore and wrecked at Ravenglass, Cumberland. |
| John Dunn | United Kingdom | The brig was driven ashore at Greenock, Renfrewshire. She was on a voyage from Saint John, New Brunswick to Greenock. |
| Pomona | United Kingdom | The ship foundered in the English Channel off St. Catherine's Point, Isle of Wight. Her eight crew survived. She was on a voyage from Teignmouth, Devon to Hull, Yorkshire. |
| Portsmouth | United Kingdom | The ship sprang a leak and was abandoned in the North Sea. Her crew were rescued by Elizabeth (United Kingdom). |
| Redbourn | United Kingdom | The ship was wrecked on the coast of Calabria, Kingdom of the Two Sicilies. Her crew were rescued. She was on a voyage from Palermo to Licata, Sicily and Liverpool, Lancashire. |

== 5 March ==
List of shipwrecks: 5 March 1824
| Ship | State | Description |
|---|---|---|
| Jonge Josephina | Netherlands | The ship was driven ashore on Walcheren, South Holland. Her crew were rescued. She was on a voyage from Liverpool, Lancashire, United Kingdom to Rotterdam, South Holland. |
| Susannah | United Kingdom | The ship was abandoned in the English Channel. Her crew were rescued by Stanmer (United Kingdom). Susannah was on a voyage from London to Liverpool, Lancashire. She was later taken in to Portsmouth, Hampshire by a pilot boat. |

== 6 March ==
List of shipwrecks: 6 March 1824
| Ship | State | Description |
|---|---|---|
| Brothers | United Kingdom | The sloop was driven ashore and wrecked in Carnarvon Bay with the loss of two of her crew. She was on a voyage from Newport, Monmouthshire to Downpatrick, County Down. |
| Experiment | United Kingdom | The ship was driven ashore at Pwllheli, Caernarfonshire. |
| Jonge Josepha | Netherlands | The ship was wrecked off Walcheren, Zeeland. Her crew were rescued. She was on a voyage from Liverpool, Lancashire, United Kingdom to Antwerp. |
| Sector | United Kingdom | The ship was wrecked on Anegado. Her crew were rescued. She was on a voyage from Trinidad to St. Thomas, Virgin Islands. |

== 7 March ==
List of shipwrecks: 7 March 1824
| Ship | State | Description |
|---|---|---|
| Adamant | United Kingdom | The ship was severely damaged on the Black Middings, in the North Sea off North Shields, County Durham. Her crew were rescued. She was on a voyage from Hull, Yorkshire to North shields. Adamant was refloated on 14 March and taken in to the Tyne for repairs. |
| Diligent | United Kingdom | The ship was wrecked on the Aberavon Sands, in Swansea Bay. All nine people on board were rescued. She was on a voyage from São Miguel, Azores, Portugal to London. |

== 8 March ==
List of shipwrecks: 8 March 1824
| Ship | State | Description |
|---|---|---|
| Albion | United Kingdom | The ship was wrecked on Cayo Blanco, Cuba. Her crew were rescued. She was on a voyage from British Honduras to London. |
| Brothers | United Kingdom | The ship was driven ashore and severely damaged at Harrington, Cumberland. She was subsequently refloated. |
| Carl Johan | Sweden | The ship was driven ashore and wrecked near Poole, Dorset, United Kingdom. She was on a voyage from Alicante, Spain to Gävle. |
| Edward | United Kingdom | The ship was driven ashore at Workington, Cumberland She was on a voyage from Belfast, County Antrim to Workington. |
| Eleanor | United Kingdom | The ship struck a sunken rock off Dunbar, Lothian and was severely damaged. She was on a voyage from King's Lynn, Norfolk to Dunbar. Eleanor was refloated on 12 March and taken in to Dunbar. |
| Friendship | United Kingdom | The ship was driven ashore at Workington. She was on a voyage from Workington to Liverpool, Lancashire. |
| Iris | United Kingdom | The ship was driven ashore at Sunderland, County Durham. |
| Leopold | United Kingdom | The ship was driven ashore at Workingdon. |
| Resolution | United Kingdom | The ship was driven ashore near St. Just, Cornwall. |

== 9 March ==
List of shipwrecks: 9 March 1824
| Ship | State | Description |
|---|---|---|
| Isis | United Kingdom | The ship was driven ashore near Whitburn, County Durham. |
| Naiad | United Kingdom | The ship struck the Cabezas Rocks, off Tarifa, Spain and was consequently beached at Gibraltar. She was on a voyage from Messina, Kingdom of the Two Sicilies to London. She was refloated later that day and taken in to Gibraltar for repairs. |

== 10 March ==
List of shipwrecks: 10 March 1824
| Ship | State | Description |
|---|---|---|
| Rebecca | United States | The ship was abandoned in the Atlantic Ocean. She was on a voyage from Ocracoke, North Carolina to Barbados. Her stern came ashore in Hungary Bay, Barbados in late April. |

== 11 March ==
List of shipwrecks: 11 March 1824
| Ship | State | Description |
|---|---|---|
| Tay | United Kingdom | The ship was discovered abandoned in the North Sea. A skeleton crew from Lavinia was placed aboard her and she was taken in to Whitby, Yorkshire. |
| William Cossar | (United Kingdom of Great Britain and Ireland) New South Wales | The schooner capsized off Fort Macquarie with the loss of three lives. She was subsequently repaired and returned to service. |

== 12 March ==
List of shipwrecks: 12 March 1824
| Ship | State | Description |
|---|---|---|
| Reine Blanche | United Kingdom | The ship was driven ashore at Newhaven, Sussex. She was on a voyage from Sunderland, County Durham to Newhaven. |

== 13 March ==
List of shipwrecks: 13 March 1824
| Ship | State | Description |
|---|---|---|
| Pleiades | United Kingdom | The ship ran aground on the Embudo and was consequently beached on the coast of Argentina. She was on a voyage from Liverpool, Lancashire to Buenos Aires. Pleiades was refloated and taken in to Ensenada, Buenos Aires. |

== 15 March ==
List of shipwrecks: 15 March 1824
| Ship | State | Description |
|---|---|---|
| James Walters | United Kingdom | The ship was wrecked on The Skerries, Anglesey. She was on a voyage from Dublin to Liverpool, Lancashire. |
| Kate | United Kingdom | The ship was wrecked on The Skerries with the loss of two lives. She was on a voyage from Dublin to Liverpool. |
| Liberality | United Kingdom | The ship foundered in the Atlantic Ocean. Her crew were rescued by Charlotte (United Kingdom). Liberality was on a voyage from Liverpool to New Brunswick, British North America. |
| Three Brothers | United Kingdom | The ship sprang a leak and foundered in the North Sea off Whitby, Yorkshire. She was on a voyage from Boston, Lincolnshire to Newcastle upon Tyne, Northumberland. Salvage was abandoned in late March. |

== 16 March ==
List of shipwrecks: 16 March 1824
| Ship | State | Description |
|---|---|---|
| Independence | United Kingdom | The ship was wrecked at São Miguel, Azores, Portugal. |
| Triton | United Kingdom | The ship was driven ashore on the coast of Sierra Leone. |

== 17 March ==
List of shipwrecks: 17 March 1824
| Ship | State | Description |
|---|---|---|
| London | United Kingdom | The ship was wrecked on the Casquets, off Alderney, Channel Islands with the loss of all but two of her crew, who were rescued by a French fishing boat. She was on a voyage from Newcastle upon Tyne, Northumberland to Guernsey, Channel Islands. |

== 18 March ==
List of shipwrecks: 18 March 1824
| Ship | State | Description |
|---|---|---|
| Bertha | Prussia | The ship was driven ashore near Dragør, Denmark. She was on a voyage from Pillau to an English port. |

== 21 March ==
List of shipwrecks: 21 March 1824
| Ship | State | Description |
|---|---|---|
| Louisa | Stettin | The ship was driven ashore and sank at Falsterbo, Sweden. Her crew survived. She was on a voyage from Memel to Liverpool, Lancashire, United Kingdom. |

== 22 March ==
List of shipwrecks: 22 March 1824
| Ship | State | Description |
|---|---|---|
| Cadmus | United Kingdom | The ship was wrecked on the east coast of Bornholm, Denmark. Her crew were rescued. She was on a voyage from North Shields, County Durham to Memel, Prussia. |
| Hero | United Kingdom | The schooner foundered at Padstow, Cornwall with the loss of all hands. She was on a voyage from Swansea, Glamorgan to Teignmouth, Devon. |

== 23 March ==
List of shipwrecks: 23 March 1824
| Ship | State | Description |
|---|---|---|
| Neptune | United Kingdom | The ship was wrecked on the east coast of Bornholm, Denmark. Her crew were rescued. She was on a voyage from North Shields, County Durham to Memel, Prussia. |

== 24 March ==
List of shipwrecks: 24 March 1824
| Ship | State | Description |
|---|---|---|
| Emanuel | (Sweden) Norway | The ship was driven ashore and wrecked at Winterton-on-Sea, Norfolk, United Kingdom. She was on a voyage from Christiansand to Newhaven, Sussex, United Kingdom. |
| Trois Sœurs | France | The galiot was wrecked at Saint-Jean-d'Acre, Ottoman Empire. |
| Vrow Gesina | Lübeck | The ship was wrecked on the coast of Lincolnshire, United Kingdom. She was on a voyage from Lübeck to Grimsby, Lincolnshire. |

== 25 March ==
List of shipwrecks: 25 March 1824
| Ship | State | Description |
|---|---|---|
| Jupiter | United Kingdom | The ship ran aground on Dungeness, Kent and was wrecked. She was on a voyage from London to Teignmouth, Devon. |

== 27 March ==
List of shipwrecks: 27 March 1824
| Ship | State | Description |
|---|---|---|
| Petronell | (Sweden) Norway | The ship was driven ashore at Winterton-on-Sea, Norfolk. United Kingdom. Her crew were rescued, She was on a voyage from "Dram" to Boulogne, Pas-de-Calais, France. |
| Wilhelmina | United States | The ship, which had collided with a whaler on 8 March, was abandoned in the Atlantic Ocean. Her crew were rescued by Eyder (flag unknown). |

== 29 March ==
List of shipwrecks: 29 March 1824
| Ship | State | Description |
|---|---|---|
| Isabella | United Kingdom | The ship was driven ashore and wrecked on Faial Island, Azores. Her crew were rescued. |
| Speedwell | United Kingdom | The ship foundered in Liverpool Bay with the loss of all hands. She was on a voyage from Creetown, Kirkcudbrightshire to Liverpool, Lancashire. |

== 30 March ==
List of shipwrecks: 30 March 1824
| Ship | State | Description |
|---|---|---|
| Catherine | United Kingdom | The schooner was wrecked at Terceira, Azores, Portugal. Her crew survived. |
| Industry | United Kingdom | The ship was run down and sunk at Falmouth, Cornwall, England, by HMS Grasshopper (Royal Navy) with the loss of a crew member. |
| Jane | United Kingdom | The sloop was wrecked at Terceira. Her crew survived. |
| Lord Wellington | United Kingdom | The schooner was wrecked at Terceira with the loss of a crew member. |
| Probity | United Kingdom | The ship was driven ashore and wrecked on Faial Island, Azores. Her crew were rescued. |
| Swift | United Kingdom | The schooner was wrecked at Terceira. Her crew survived. |

== 31 March ==
List of shipwrecks: 31 March 1824
| Ship | State | Description |
|---|---|---|
| Fly | United Kingdom | The sloop was run down and sunk in the English Channel. Her crew were rescued by Nautilus (United Kingdom). She was on a voyage from London to Portsmouth, Hampshire. |
| Hope | United Kingdom | The brig struck a rock in Galway Bay and foundered. Her crew survived. |
| Orion | Prussia | The ship was driven ashore and wrecked at Memel. Her crew were rescued. She was on a voyage from St. Ubes, Portugal to Memel. |

== Unknown date ==
List of shipwrecks: Unknown date in March 1824
| Ship | State | Description |
|---|---|---|
| Amity | United Kingdom | The ship foundered in the Irish Sea off Whitehaven, Cumberland. She was on a voyage from Dublin to Lancaster, Lancashire. |
| Elizabeth | United Kingdom | The ship departed from Poole, Dorset for Labrador, British North America in late March. No further trace, presumed foundered with the loss of all hands. |
| Endeavour | United Kingdom | The ship was lost on the coast of Calabria, Kingdom of the Two Sicilies. She was on a voyage from Cardiff, Glamorgan to Messina, Sicily. |
| Gute Mutter | flag unknown | The ship was lost on the Norwegian coast. She was on a voyage from Riga, Russia to Londonderry. United Kingdom. |
| Isabella | United Kingdom | The ship was wrecked at Faial, Azores between 26 and 31 March. |
| Lillie | United Kingdom | The ship was wrecked at Faial between 26 and 31 March. |
| Matchless | United Kingdom | The ship was wrecked in the Dardanelles. She was on a voyage from Candia, Crete to Constantinople, Ottoman Empire. |
| Oliva | United Kingdom | The brig was driven ashore on the coast of Calabria and was abandoned by her crew. She was later refloated and taken in to Malta by Principe Christiano Augusto ( Kingdom of Sardinia). |
| Plata | United Kingdom | The ship was driven ashore in the River Plate. |
| Probity | United Kingdom | The ship was wrecked at Faial between 26 and 31 March. |
| Sea Lion | United States | The schooner was lost at Tenerife, Spain. |
| Ulysses | United Kingdom | The ship was driven ashore on the coast of Calabria, Kingdom of the Two Sicilies. |
| Unanimous | United Kingdom | The ship was lost on The Swin. She was on a voyage from Sligo to London. |
