= Wendell State Forest =

Protected area in Massachusetts, United States

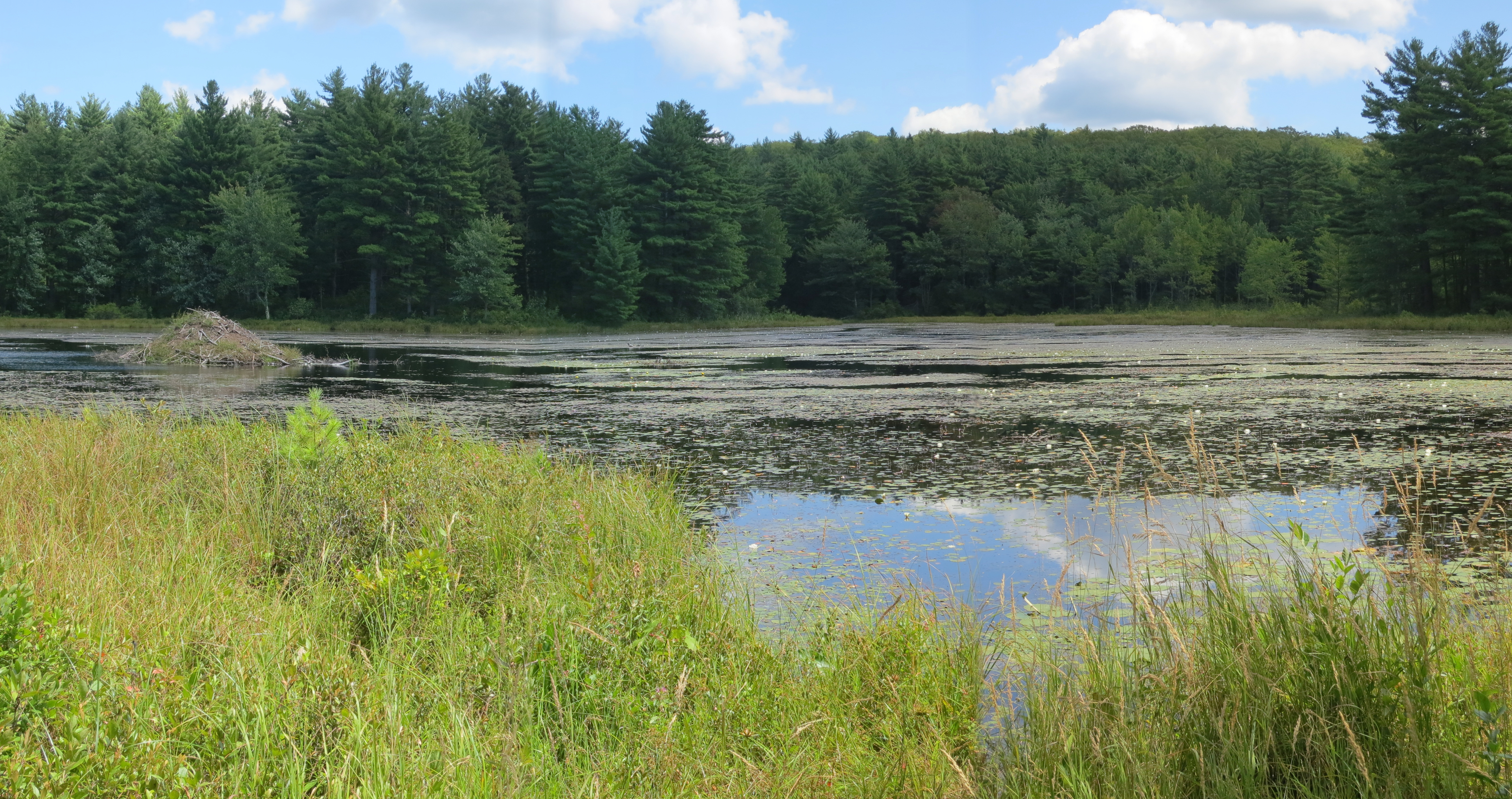
- Beaver activity on Ruggles Pond

- Location within Massachusetts Location within the United States
- Location: Wendell, Massachusetts, United States
- Coordinates: 42°32′53″N 72°26′52″W
- Area: 8,000 acres (3,200 ha)
- Elevation: 968 ft (295 m)
- Administrator: Massachusetts Department of Conservation and Recreation
- Website: Official website

Wendell State Forest is a Massachusetts state forest located in the town of Wendell. The 7,566-acre (3,062 ha) parcel occupies a forested and hilly upland plateau south of the Millers River and west of the Quabbin Reservoir. Park roads were developed by the Civilian Conservation Corps in the 1930s.

== Activities and amenities ==
- Ponds: The day-use area at 10-acre (4.0 ha) Ruggles Pond offers swimming, fishing and a picnic area. The southern end of Ruggles Pond has beaver activities, while the northern end has human activities. Wickett Pond has a boat ramp at its northern end.
- Trails: Trails are used for walking, hiking, mountain biking, horseback riding, and cross-country skiing. Backcountry camping is available at a lean-to along the Metacomet-Monadnock Trail.
- The forest is also used for hunting (in season) and forest product extraction.

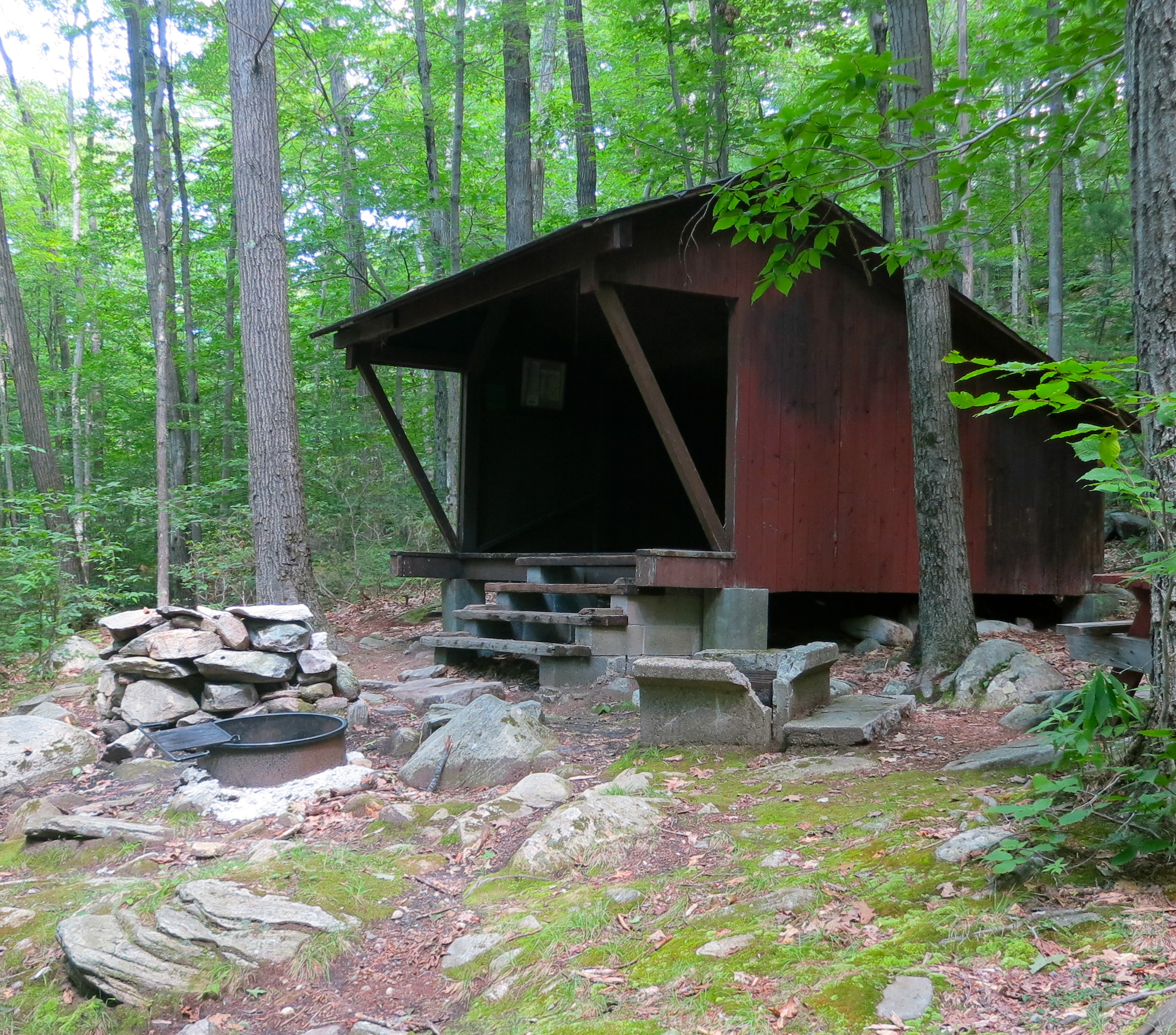
Adirondack type lean-to along the M & M Trail just north of Ruggles Pond

=== Hidden Valley Memorial Forest ===
Hidden Valley Memorial Forest is a 67-acre (27 ha) "in-holding' within Wendell State Forest owned by the Mount Grace Land Conservation Trust. It was donated in 1996 to the Mount Grace Land Conservation Trust by the Mrs. Mabel Cronquist, widow of noted botanist, author and curator of the New York Botanical Garden Dr. Arthur Cronquist, in his memory. Hidden Valley was the research camp and vacation home of Dr. Cronquist and his family.

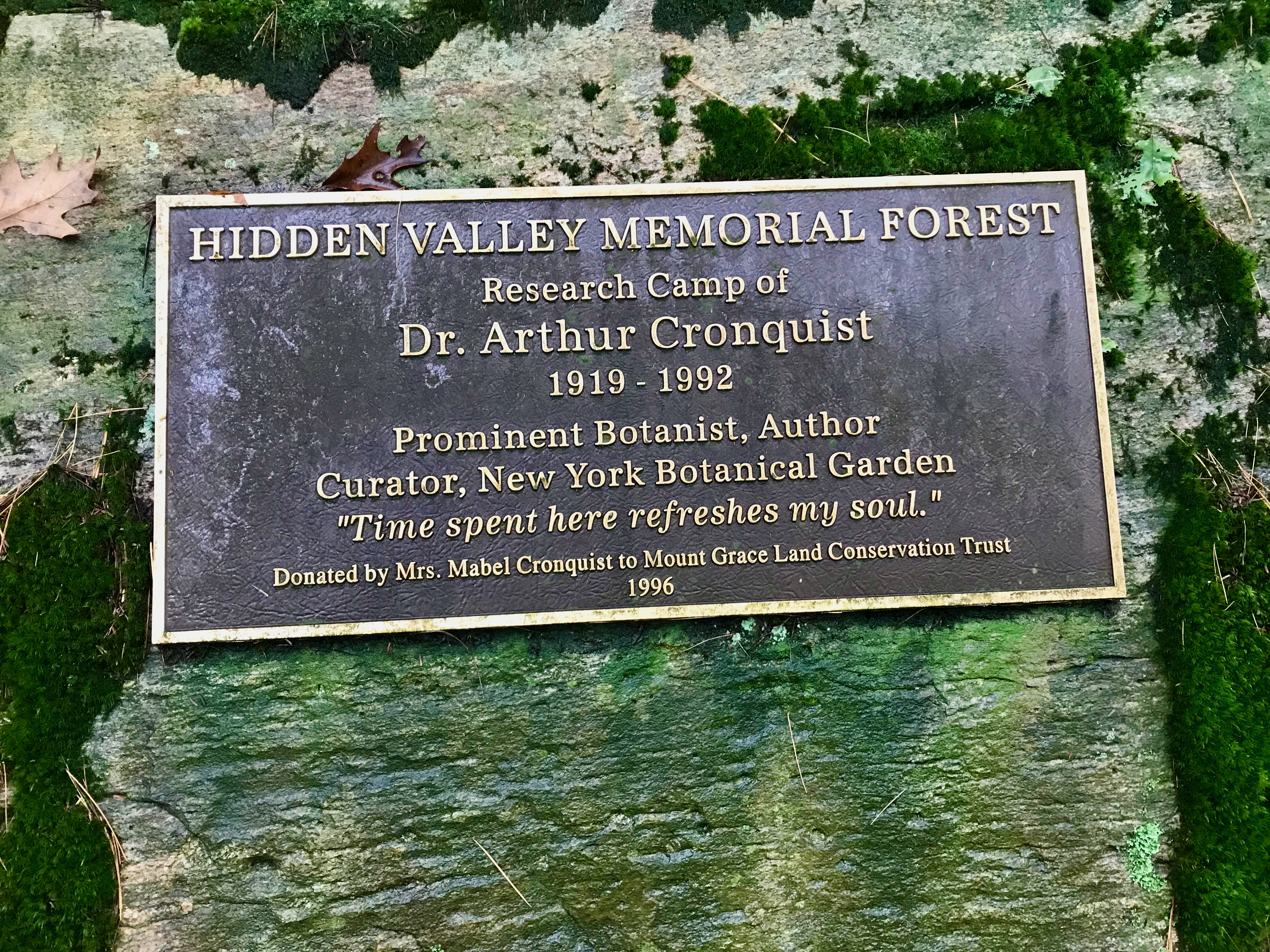
Hidden Valley Memorial Forest Plaque in Wendell State Forest

"... there is a plaque on a large boulder on the trail leading to the property which honors Mr. Cronquist. All that remains now of the homestead that was lived in by three generations of the Hunter family is a large, fairly intact cellar hole in the middle of the woods."

Lynne's Falls, located within the Hidden Valley Memorial Forest parcel, is named after Cronquist's daughter.
