= HMS Decoy (1810) =

Cutter of the Royal Navy

History

United Kingdom
- Name: Decoy
- Ordered: 2 October 1809
- Builder: Daniel List, Fishbourne
- Laid down: November 1809
- Launched: 22 March 1810
- Captured: 22 March 1814

General characteristics
- Class & type: Decoy-class
- Type: Cutter
- Tons burthen: 20332/94 (bm)
- Length: Overall:75 ft 0 in (22.9 m); Keel:56 ft 6 5/8 in (17.2 m)
- Beam: 26 ft 0 in (7.9 m)
- Depth of hold: 11 ft 0 in (3.4 m)
- Propulsion: Sails
- Complement: 60
- Armament: 10 × 18-pounder carronades

HMS Decoy was launched in 1810. She participated in the capture of several small French privateers, captured or recaptured a number of merchant vessels, and captured a number of smuggling vessels. The French captured her in 1814.

== Career ==
Lieutenant John Pearce (or Pearse) commissioned Decoy in May 1810 for the Channel.

On 6 November 1810 Decoy, recaptured Lord Boringdon, which was an old, 194 ton (bm), Danish-built vessel that normally sailed between Plymouth and Lisbon. The salvage money notice referred to Decoy as "His Majesty's hired Cutter", an erroneous assumption based on the fact that most of the cutters serving the navy at the time were hired armed vessels.

As with the revenue cutters, Decoy also captured smugglers. On 23 May she captured the boat Dart, and on 4 June, the boat Bee.

On 30 December Decoy recovered some 25 bags of cotton, some marked "W. Hampton". A week or so later two fishing boats and HMS Kangaroo also brought in similar bales of cotton. The bales may have come from a vessel that had foundered. Decoy and her crew later received salvage money for those bales and also for some retrieved on 14 April 1811.

On 26 July 1811, Decoy and Pigmy ran a French privateer lugger on shore between Gravelines and Dunkirk, and destroyed her.

On 24 November Decoy captured the smuggling smack Henry, which was carrying spirits.

On 21 December, Decoy ran foul of Dove, of Colchester, Dye, master. The accident happened near Dover as Dove was sailing to Little Hampton. Dove lost her bowsprit and mast, and had her bows stove in.

On 28 December Decoy seized smuggled spirits.

On 2 January 1812 Decoy recaptured Olive Branch.

On 5 April, Decoy seized smuggled spirits and lace. This may have been in connection with the capture of a smuggling boat. (Note: Pearse's share of the prize money for the boat was £12 2s 3d; the share of a seaman was 1s 11 3/4d.)

On 10 May Decoy and Pioneer captured the French privateer lugger Infatigable. She was six hours out of Boulogne and had made no captures. Of her crew of 29 men her captain was killed and 9 men were wounded before she struck.

On 13 May 1812 a French row boat privateer, of 29 men, prize to Decoy, arrived at Dover.

Decoy was at Portsmouth on 31 July 1812 when the British authorities seized the American ships there and at Spithead on the outbreak of the War of 1812. She therefore shared, with numerous other vessels, in the subsequent prize money for these vessels: Belleville, Aeos, Janus, Ganges, and Leonidas. (Note: So many vessels shared in the prize money that the amounts per man were small. A second-class share, that of a lieutenant, was £3 11s; a sixth-class share, that of an ordinary seaman, was 4s 1d.)

On 11 September 1812 HMS Bermuda captured the French privateer lugger Bon Genie, that the cutters Pioneer and Dwarf were chasing. Bon Genie was pierced for 16 guns but only had four mounted. She had a crew of 60 men, and did not strike until she had lost three men killed and 16 wounded, most severely. (Note: Dwarf was a sister ship to Decoy, which may have been in sight as she shared in the prize money.) (Note: Bon Génie, a 20-metre-long privateer from Boulogne, was commissioned in September 1810. Her first cruise from September 1810 to November 1810 was under Pierre-Antoine Hénin, with 84 men and 16 guns. She made two cruises from November 1810 to May 1811, and from September 1811 to March 1812, under Louis Delpierre. From September 1813, she was under Captain Picquendaire.)

Decoy captured three Prussian brigs in 1813: Den Frieden (11 May), Courier (23 June), and Hoop (24 June). Defender was in sight at the capture of Hoop.

On 29 July Decoy captured the smuggler Lark. (Note: Pearse's share of the prize money was £9 9s 7 1/2d; a seaman's share was 1s 8 3/4d.)

On 7 September 1813 Decoy and Pioneer recaptured the English brig William.

On 13 November Decoy captured the smuggler Fox. (Note: Pearse's share of the prize money was £60 12s 9d; a seaman's share was 11s 5d.)

== Fate ==
Decoy grounded off Calais on 22 March 1814, enabling the French to capture her. Lloyd's List reported that she had got under the batteries and that in the ensuing engagement two of her crew were killed.

The courtmartial of Pearce and his men found that she had grounded in a dense fog, Pearce and the officer of the watch, a midshipman, believing that she was eight miles off shore. All efforts to lighten her and get her off failed and as the water receded she was revealed to be lying on the Waldram Flats. A party of French soldiers approached and opened fire with small arms, wounding a seaman on Decoy. Decoy returned fire with her guns and with small arms and drove them off. Efforts to prop her up to await the next tide failed and she fell on her side. A larger party of soldiers arrived under a flag of truce and offered good terms of surrender so Pearce struck. The courtmartial admonished Pearce to be more careful in the future. It ordered the midshipman who had been on watch to forfeit all his outstanding pay and to be ineligible for promotion for three years. Lastly, it ordered the two pilots to lose all pay due them and sentenced one to six months in the Marshalsea Prison.
