= HMS Kangaroo (1805) =

Sloop of the Royal Navy

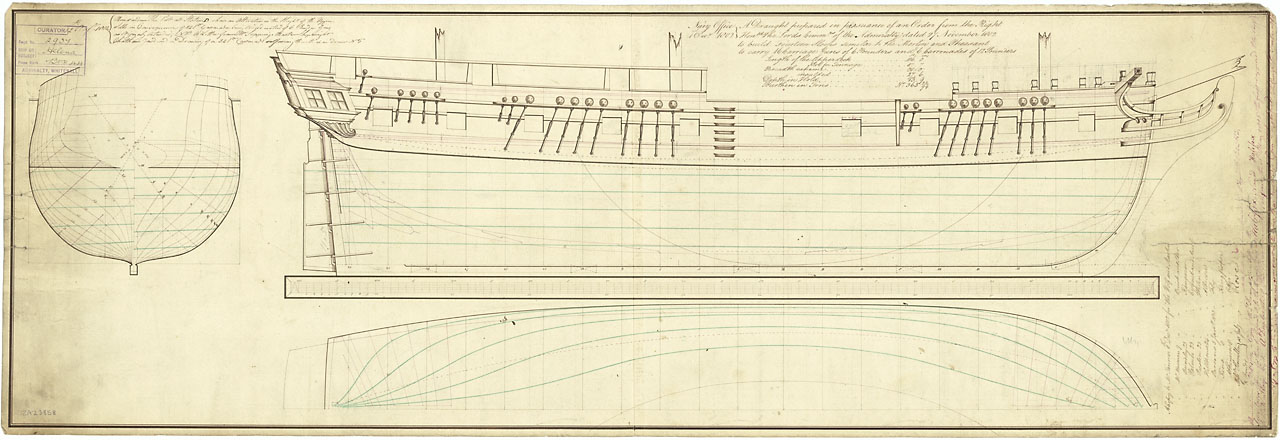
- Kangaroo

History

United Kingdom
- Name: HMS Kangaroo
- Builder: Joseph Brindley, Lynn
- Laid down: August 1803
- Launched: 19 September 1805

United Kingdom
- Name: Countess of Morley
- Namesake: Frances Talbot, Countess of Morley
- Acquired: 1815 by purchase
- Fate: Possibly condemned c.1827; last listed 1833

General characteristics
- Class & type: Sloop
- Tons burthen: 36940/94, or 381 bm
- Length: Overall: 106 ft 1 in (32.3 m); Keel: 87 ft 6 1/2 in (26.7 m)
- Beam: 28 ft 2 in (8.6 m)
- Depth of hold: 13 ft 9.5 in (4.20 m)
- Complement: 121
- Armament: Upper deck:16 × 32-pounder carronades; QD:6 × 12-pounder carronades; Fc:2 × 12-pounder guns

HMS Kangaroo was an 18-gun sloop of the Royal Navy launched in 1805. The Navy sold her in 1815 and she became the whaler Countess of Morley. After three whaling voyages she became a merchantman. She may have been condemned c.1827; she was last listed in 1833.

== Naval vessel ==
Commander Henry Laroche commissioned her in January 1806 for the North Sea Station. Commander John Baker replaced Laroche in 1807.

On 3 February 1807 Two Brothers, Fox, master, arrived in the Downs after Kangaroo had recaptured her.. The French privateer Napoleon, of Boulogne, armed with 18 guns and carrying 98 men, had captured Two Brothers as she was sailing from Sunderland to Portsmouth.

On 20 February 1807 with Kangaroo was in company with Otter and Clyde and so shared in the salvage money for the recapture of Farely, John Fryer, master.

On 22 March Kangaroo captured Paccage, P. F. Nicotte, master.

On 10 June Kangaroo captured Harriott, Harlow, master. Harriett, of Baltimore, had been sailing from Bordeaux to Tonningen when Kangaroo detained her and sent her into the Downs.

On 8 December Kangaroo recaptured Minerva, of Arundel, John Chapman, master. Kangaroo took Minerve into Newhaven.

On 20 November 1808, after a two hour chase, Kangaroo captured the French privateer lugger Egayant (or Gayant) some ten or 12 miles SE of Dungeness. She was armed with 14 guns and had a crew of 31 men. She was brand new and had sailed from Calais the previous morning on her first cruise. She taken one prize, a foreign galliot in ballast.

In December Kangaroo towed the naval transport Supply into the Downs. Supply had lost her foremast and bowsprit.

In 1809 Kangaroo participated in the ill-fated Walcheren Campaign. A British force landed on 30 July 1809, and withdrew in December, having accomplished little and having suffered extensive casualties, primarily from disease. On 14 August San Domingo, the flagship of Admiral Sir Richard John Strachan grounded; Clyde came to her assistance until she could be refloated. However, Strachan moved his flag to Kangaroo. Later, she shared in the prize money for the property the British army captured during the campaign.

On 9 January 1811 Kangaroo brought into Newhaven five bales of raw cotton marked "W. Hampton", and two unmarked bales. These were like some bales that two fishing boats found floating near Beachy Head. On 9 January 1811 Kangaroo brought into Newhaven five bales of raw cotton marked "W. Hampton", and two unmarked bales. These were like some bales that two fishing boats found floating near Beachy Head. The bales may have come from a vessel that had foundered. Earlier, on 30 December, HMS Decoy had recovered some 25 similar bales.

Kangaroo then escorted convoys in the Channel and to and from Jamaica. In 1813 she convoyed vessels to and from the Baltic. In 1814 she convoyed vessels to and from the Iberian Peninsula.

Having departed Plymouth, (Note: Plymouth, 31 December. Kangaroo SW sailed for America.) on 2 March 1815 Kangaroo arrived at Halifax, Nova Scotia with dispatches, which announce the end of the war, (Note: The Prince Regent assented to the Treaty of Peace with America... dispatches having been forwarded, with instructions to our Commanders in consequence of the event. These instructions went off in the Brazen, Capt. Stirling, and Kangaroo, Capt. Hall.) and a cartel schooner. (Note: Halifax. 2 March, arrived from Portsmouth Kangaroo SW with the Treaty of Peace, out 62 days, Lingen Cartel with the ratified Treaty of Peace. 16 March, Kangaroo SW sailed for Gibraltar.) Some two weeks later she escorted two transports carrying American prisoners to Salem, after the treaty ending the war with America. She arrived at Plymouth on 11 May 1815, having previously stopped at Gibraltar.

Disposal: The "Principal Officers and Commissioners of His Majesty's Navy" offered the "Kangaroo sloop, of 369 tons", "lying at Plymouth", for sale on 14 December 1815. Kangaroo sold at Plymouth on that day for £1,900.

== Whaler ==
New owners renamed Kangaroo the Countess of Morley and sailed her as whaler to the Southern Whale Fishery. She entered Lloyd's Register (LR) in 1816 with H. Best, master, Rowe & Co., owners, and trade Plymouth–South Seas.

1st whaling voyage (1816-1818): Captain H. Best sailed from Plymouth on 15 May 1816, bound for the Pacific. Countess of Morley returned on 19 June 1818 with 1900 barrels of whale oil. The voyage was a singularly safe one in that the crew suffered no deaths, illness, or casualties.

2nd whaling voyage (1818–1821): Captain Luck (or Luce, or Lewis), sailed from Plymouth on 24 October 1818, bound for the Galapagos Islands. On her voyage Countess of Morley was variously reported at Valparaíso, Coquimbo, and the Azores. In late 1819 an Andes Chilean armed ship detained her, "seduced eight of her best seamen from her", and gave her eight "worthless men" in return. Between 25 March 1821 and 2 May she was at Valparaíso with 1800 barrels of oil; she then returned to the fisheries. Countess of Morley returned to Plymouth on 25 December 1821 with 2400 barrel of whale oil, much of it sperm oil.

3rd whaling voyage (1822-1825): Captain H. Best sailed from Plymouth on 13 September 1822. Countess of Morley returned to Plymouth on 5 August 1825. Later that month she was offered for sale at Devonport.

== Merchantman ==
Countess of Morley underwent repairs in 1825 for damages. The Register of Shipping (RS) for 1826 showed her master changing from H. Best to Warren. Her new owner was Billings, and her trade changed from Plymouth–South Seas to Plymouth–Buenos Aires. Lloyd's List reported on 11 May 1827 that as she was sailing for Quebec, in coming down from Stonehouse Pool she ran aground. She was gotten off and proceeded on her voyage.

== Fate ==
Lloyd's List of 22 April 1828 reported that Countess of Morley was leaky at Sierra Leone and had been obliged to discharge. Although she was last listed in LR and the RS in 1833, the data was stale, consistent with her having been condemned at Sierra Leone.
