= HMS Milbrook (1798) =

Sloop of the Royal Navy

History

Great Britain
- Name: HMS Milbrook
- Ordered: 1797
- Builder: Hobbs & Hellyer, Redbridge
- Laid down: 1797
- Launched: 1798
- Fate: Wrecked 25 March 1808

General characteristics
- Type: Experimental design
- Tons burthen: 148 (bm)
- Length: 81 ft 8 1/2 in (24.9 m) (overall); 57 ft 6 in (17.5 m) (keel)
- Beam: 21 ft 0 in (6.4 m)
- Depth of hold: 9 ft 8 in (2.9 m)
- Sail plan: Schooner
- Complement: 50
- Armament: 16 × 18-pounder carronades; later 12

HMS Milbrook (or Millbrook) was one of six vessels built to an experimental design by Sir Samuel Bentham. After the Royal Navy took her into service in her decade-long career she took part in one notable single-ship action and captured several privateers and other vessels, all off the coast of Spain and Portugal. She was wrecked off the coast of Portugal in 1808.

== Design ==
Hobbs & Hellyer built six vessels to Bentham's design. Milbrook was a somewhat smaller version of his Dart-class vessels (Dart and Arrow), and of another schooner, Netley. Bentham's designs featured little sheer, negative tumblehome, a large-breadth to length ratio with structural bulkheads, and sliding keels. They were also virtually double-ended.

== Career ==
=== French Revolutionary Wars ===
Lieutenant Matthew Smith commissioned Milbrook in December 1798. She was re-rated as a gunvessel in 1799. In February 1800 Smith wrote that the Barrack-master-general (General Oliver de Lancey) had ordered that she continue to serve the board he headed because she was "extremely fast, in all weathers a good sea-boat, tight as a bottle." Still, she received coppering at Portsmouth in April 1800.

Milbrook was part of Admiral Sir John Borlase Warren's squadron and so entitled to share in the proceeds from the squadron's cutting out of the French privateer Guêppe on 30 August from Vigo Bay. (Note: A first-class share of the prize money was worth £42 19s 6½d; a fifth-class share, that of a seaman, was worth 1s 9½d.)

A violent gust of wind drove the frigate Stag on shore on 6 September in Vigo Bay. There was no loss of life, due in large part to Milbrook, which rescued many survivors. Stag's officers blew Stag up to prevent the French salvaging anything useful, and her crew were distributed amongst the fleet.

On 26 September Milbrook captured the American brig Atlas, while Atlas was sailing between Vigo and Seville.

Milbrook and Bellone

Some two weeks later, on 13 October, Milbrook engaged a French privateer in a notable but ultimately indecisive action. Milbrook was lying becalmed off Oporto when she sighted a strange sail, apparently a French 36-gun frigate. Smith was escorting two brigs of the Newfoundland fleet and there were other vessels, possibly of that fleet, in the offing. To protect the merchantmen Milbrook sailed to intercept the enemy vessel.

The action began at 8 a.m. and lasted until nearly 10 a.m., in almost complete calm, until the French vessel struck. However, Milbrook's rigging was so badly cut and her boats holed, that she was unable to take possession of her prize; seeing this, when a light breeze came up the French vessel used her sails and sweeps to escape. In the action Milbrook had ten of her carronades dismounted, and had 12 men (out of a crew of 47) wounded. At one point Milbrook had only three carronades firing as she used her sweeps to change her position and had to endure the raking fire from her opponent for 15 minutes. Milbrook was so damaged that she had to be towed into the Tagus.

Later accounts reveal that the French vessel was the privateer Bellone, of Bordeaux. The reports credit Milbrook with having her carronades fixed on the non-recoil principle (i.e., fixed to the vessel so that the vessel absorbs the recoil and the cannons did not have to be run out before firing again), enabling Milbrook to fire 11 broadsides before the French vessel could fire three. Bellone had to put into Vigo and reports from there suggested that she had suffered 20 men killed, and her first and second captains and 45 men wounded, out of a crew of 220-260 men. Bellone had been armed with twenty-four 8-pounder guns and six or eight 36-pounder carronades. (Note: This would have given Bellone a broadside of 194 (French) pounds, to Milbrook's broadside of 128 (English) pounds. Thus the disparity in the weight of a broadside was less than that in the number of cannons, though the disparity in number of men much favored the French. Milbrook getting close to Bellone made moot the issue of the greater range of the French 8-pounder guns; at close range the ability to fire the short-barreled and fixed carronades more rapidly than the French guns gave Milbrook an advantage in terms of the weight of shot she was able to discharge during the initial course of the engagement.)

As a reward for his gallantry, Smith received promotion to commander. Also, the British factory of Oporto voted him their thanks, and presented him with a piece of silver plate worth £50.

Smith was still in command, and off Spain, on 19 December when Milbrook captured the Spanish privateer lugger Barcelo.

At some point in 1800, Milbrook shared with Hussar and Loire in the capture of Francoise, and recapture of Princess Charlotte.

In February 1801 Lieutenant Mauritius Adolphus Newton de Starck, who signed his name as Newton Starck, replaced Smith in command of Milbrook. On 15 September Milbrook was off Cape Montego when she sighted a Spanish privateer. After a long chase, Milbrook captured Baptista, of eight guns, which was carrying a valuable cargo of English prize butter from Vigo to Seville.

On 6 September Milbrook was at Plymouth awaiting carry dispatches to Rear-Admiral Sir James Saumarez, and the garrison at Gibraltar. Two days later Milbrook left for Portsmouth, on her way to the fleet off Cadiz.

Milbrook returned to Portsmouth from Lisbon on 22 August 1802. She was paid off and Starck recommissioned her on 31 October in Portsmouth.

=== Napoleonic wars ===
By July 1803 Milbrook had assumed her station off Dunkirk in company with Lynx and Basilisk. On 11 August Milbrook convoyed 50 vessels from Portsmouth to the Downs.

August–September she was in pursuit of a strange vessel when she grounded on Kentish Knocke. She lay there for some seven hours with the sea breaking over her before she was able to free herself. Subsequently, J. Helby, foreman of shipwrights, wrote that she had survived without any damage shocks that would bilge most other vessels.

On 28 October 1803, Milbrook and Merlin were off Dunkirk when they pursued and drove on shore the French privateer lugger Sept Freres. Sept Freres was armed with two guns and had a crew of 30 men under the command of Citizen Pollet. Milbrook anchored close to the lugger and came under fire from some field guns on shore. Though she took some hits, the British suffered no casualties. Head money was finally paid in May 1827. (Note: A first class share of the head money was worth £39 13s 0¾d; a fifth-class share was worth 4s 11¼d.)

On 28 March 1804 Milbrook and Starck sailed with a number of other vessels for the Boulogne station. Lieutenant John C. Carpenter was appointed to Milbrook on 30 April, and in May replaced Starck. On 3 June Milbrook and an armed ship sailed from Portsmouth to cruise off Calais. She returned to Deal on 22 July, having lost cables and anchors. Milbrook arrived at Portsmouth from the Downs on 24 August. she sailed on 17 September with the gun-brigs Attack and Steady to escort the Newfoundland fleet to Poole, where Wolf would relieve them.

On 6 May 1805 Milbrook captured the Spanish privateer lugger Travela, of three guns and 40 men, off Oporto. Travela had the day before captured a brig carrying wine from Oporto. Carpenter suspected that Travela had sent the brig to Vigo, so he sailed there. On the morning of 9 May he intercepted the British brig Stork in the Bayona Islands (Baiona) outside Vigo. Stork, which was carrying salt, had been part of the Newfoundland convoy when the 12-gun Spanish privateer brig Fenix had captured her a month earlier. The vessel Travela had captured may have been Constantia, Luftman, master, which had just left Oporto for Belfast.

In early June the Portuguese vessel Rosalie, which Milbrook had detained as Rosalie was sailing from Lisbon to Nantes, arrived in Plymouth.

On 18 May 1806, Milbrook was escorting John, Lothringen, master, from Lisbon to Oporto when they encountered a French 74-gun ship and a frigate off the Berlengas (known to the British as the Burlings). The French vessels captured John, but Milbrook escaped.

In September Carpenter resigned from Milbrook, and Lieutenant James Leach replaced him in command. On 30 August 1807, Milbrook recaptured the brig Badger, of Dublin. (Note: A Spanish row boat had captured Badger, of 101 tons (bm), Thornton, master, and had run her aground. Badger had been sailing from Dublin to Oporto and the incident occurred on 31 August off Oporto. Milbrook pulled her off.) A little over two weeks later, on, 17 September, Milbrook, in company with the letter of marque Ceres, captured the Danish brig Kraben. Kraben was condemned to the Crown.

On 26 October, Tsar Alexander I of Russia declared war on Great Britain. The official news did not arrive there until 2 December, at which time the British declared an embargo on all Russian vessels in British ports. Milbrook was one of some 70 vessels that shared in the seizure of the 44-gun Russian frigate Speshnoy (Speshnyy), then in Portsmouth harbour. The British seized the Russian storeship Wilhelmina (Vilghemina) at the same time. The Russian vessels were carrying the payroll for Vice-Admiral Dmitry Senyavin's squadron in the Mediterranean. (Note: A seaman on any one of the 70 British vessels received 14s 7½d in prize money.)

The British consul at Oporto, and the factory both wrote letters of thanks to Leach for his services to the British trade with Oporto and the factory gave him a piece of plate worth £50.

== Fate ==
Milbrook arrived off Berlenga Grande Island in the Berlengas—known traditionally to the British as "the Burlings"—in the Atlantic Ocean off the coast of Portugal on 24 March 1808 and anchored. While she was changing to a better position a squall struck her and drove her onto a reef. Her crew hauled her off and into clear water where she rode out the night. However, at 8 a.m. on 25 March, her cable fasteners gave way and she was again driven on the rocks, where she bilged. She quickly fell on her side and was lost. The crew was saved.

At the subsequent court martial the letters from Oporto were read into evidence, and the court martial not only exonerated Leach but "deemed his conduct highly meritorious and praiseworthy". His officers and crew presented him with a sword worth 50 guineas as a token of their esteem. He next captained the hired armed lugger Black Joke on a special service to the Spanish coast before taking command of the bomb vessel Desperate on the Downs station.
