= Hired armed lugger Black Joke =

His Majesty's hired armed lugger Black Joke was a lugger of ten 12-pounder carronades and 10892/94 tons burthen that entered into the service of the Royal Navy on 22 May 1808.

Lieutenant James Leach, late of Milbrook, captained Black Joke on a special service to the Spanish coast before taking command of the bomb vessel Desperate on the Downs station.

Lieutenant Moses Cannadey (or Cannady) became Black Joke's captain after having been captain of Pickle, which he had wrecked on 27 July 1808. On 15 May 1809 Black Joke, under Cannadey, captured San Buona Ventura. This was probably the Spanish lugger Buena Ventura, which had been sailing from Bayonne to Bilbao and which Black Joke sent into Plymouth on the 23rd.

On 10 June 1809 Amelia and Statira captured several French vessels, including the French corvette Mouche, of 16 brass 8-pounder guns and a crew of 180 men, which Black Joke had exchanged broadsides with some time earlier. Between 30 July and 16 August Black Joke participated in the unsuccessful expedition to Walcheren and the adjacent Scheldt islands.

On 22 April 1810 she recaptured Francis. Another account has the recapture taking place on 18 April. Francis had been sailing from Fayal to Liverpool when she was captured. She arrived at Scilly on 26 May. Salvage money for Francis was due for payment on 20 October 1810.

On 1 June the French captured Black Joke in the Channel. Black Joke had been carrying dispatches from Constantinople and Malta, and possibly overland dispatches from India, at the time of her capture. Lloyd's List described her as carrying only four guns, and reported that two French privateers had captured her and taken her into Algiers.

She may have been the same vessel as the Hired armed cutter Black Joke. In his narrative of his voyages in the Mediterranean between 1810 and 1814, Charles Robert Cockerell reports traveling with Lieutenant Cannadey in April 1810 to Constantinople and the retaking of Francis en route. He further reports that Black Joke was an old vessel, having been at the Battle of Camperdown, which is consistent with one of the first mentions of the cutter Black Joke.

Cockerell has her being captured off Algiers by two French privateers, one of 10 and one of 8 guns. Lord Byron describes Black Joke as having 6 guns and a crew of 27 men. He further writes that Captain Sir Robert Barrie of Pomone reported that two privateers had captured Black Joke off Sardinia, but not until after she had lost seven men of her crew killed resisting them and Cannadey had succeeded in throwing his dispatches overboard. Lloyd's List reported that a large privateer had taken Black Joke into Algiers. It further noted that she had overland mails from India aboard.

In 1811, Cannadey is listed as the captain of the lugger Defender, in the Downs. Lieutenant Moses Cannadey died at Plymstock on 14 January 1829.
