= HMS Defender (1809) =

British gunboat (1809–1814)

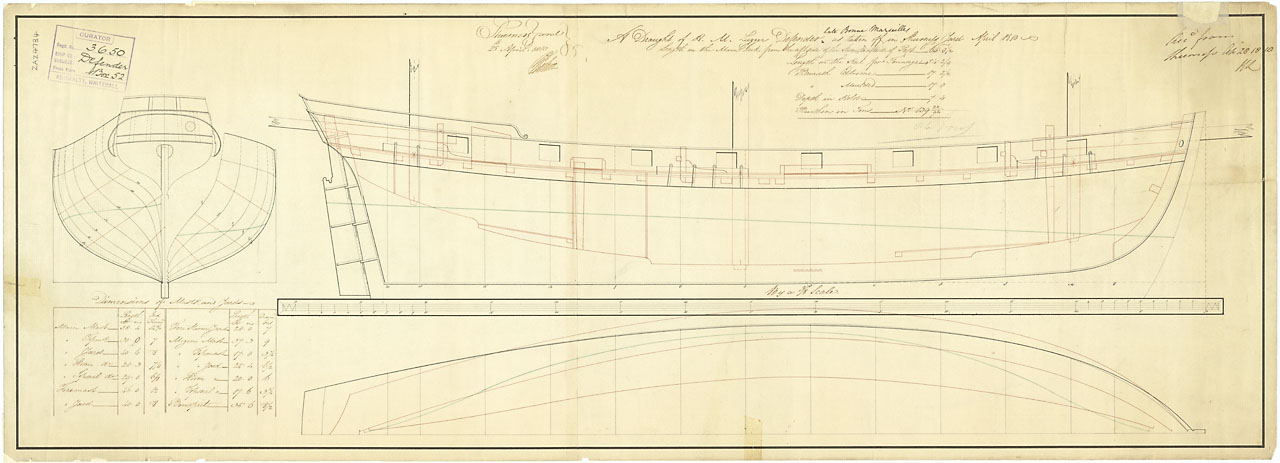
- Defender

History

France
- Name: Bon Marcel
- Commissioned: 1809
- Captured: 10 December 1809

United Kingdom
- Name: HMS Defender
- Acquired: 1809 by capture
- Commissioned: January 1811
- Fate: Sold 1814

General characteristics
- Tons burthen: 13923/94 (bm)
- Length: 65 ft 0 1/2 in (19.8 m) (overall; 54 ft 2 1/2 in (16.5 m) (keel)
- Beam: 17 ft 2 1/2 in (5.2 m)
- Depth of hold: 7 ft 4 in (2.2 m)
- Propulsion: Sails
- Sail plan: Lugger
- Complement: 40
- Armament: 8 × 12-pounder carronades

HMS Defender was the French privateer lugger Bon Marcel (Beau Marseilles in British records), that Royalist captured in 1809. Defender served without distinction in Home Waters for slightly more than three years before being sold in 1814.

== Career ==
Royalist captured Beau Marseille on 10 December 1809. She was armed with 14 guns, had a crew of 60 men and was three months old. Commander John Maxwell, captain of Royalist, described her as "a very beautiful vessel" and "one of the fastest sailers out of Boulogne." (Note: The prize's name was Bon Marcel, which the British misread as Beau Marseille or Bonne Marseille. She was a lugger commissioned at Boulogne in 1809, of 70 tons ("of load"), 120-ton displacement, 20.4-metre long (18.0 at the keel), 5.25 m beam and 2.44 m draft.) (Note: Bon Marcel was one of six privateers that Maxwell captured between May 1809 and February 1810. For this productivity Maxwell received promotion to post-captain in June 1810. In 1847 the Admiralty rewarded the surviving claimants from Royalist the Naval General Service Medal with clasp "Royalist May & June 1810". Long points out that the dates given on the official list are wrong.)

The Royal Navy took Bon Marcel into service as Defender. From 15 February to 16 March 1811 she underwent fitting out at Sheerness.

In January 1811 Lieutenant Moses Cannadey commissioned her for The Downs. (Note: For several prior years Cannadey had served as the captain of the hired armed lugger Black Joke, which the French captured in the Mediterranean in 1810.)

On 24 June 1813 Defender captured Hope. Defender shared the prize money for Hoop with Decoy.

== Fate ==
Defender was offered for sale in August 1814. She was sold at Chatham for £280 on 1 September 1814.
