= HMS Pioneer (1810) =

British naval schooner or cutter (1810–1849)

History

United Kingdom
- Name: HMS Pioneer
- Ordered: 2 October 1809
- Builder: John King, Upnor
- Laid down: December 1809
- Launched: 10 March 1810
- Completed: By 21 June 1810
- Fate: Sold 4 September 1849

General characteristics
- Class & type: Pigmy-class schooner
- Tons burthen: 197, or 19868/94 (bm)
- Length: Overall: 82 ft 10 in (25.2 m); Keel; 70 ft 7 1/2 in (21.5 m)
- Beam: 23 ft 0 in (7.0 m)
- Depth of hold: 10 ft 1 in (3.1 m)
- Propulsion: Sails
- Sail plan: Cutter; latter schooner
- Complement: 60
- Armament: 10 × 12-pounder carronades

HMS Pioneer was a Pigmy–class schooner of the Royal Navy, launched in 1810 as a cutter. During her service with the Navy she captured one French privateer and assisted at the capture of another. In 1823–1824 she underwent fitting for the Coast Guard blockade. She then served with the Coast Guard to 1845. She was sold at Plymouth in 1849.

== Royal Navy ==
Lieutenant John Row Morris commissioned Pioneer in May 1810.

Pioneer shared with Lyra and Constant in the proceeds from the capture on 14 October of Delphina.

Between October and November 1811, Pioneer was at Sheerness, being converted to a schooner. However, mentions of her in the press alternated between "cutter" and "schooner", and occasionally, "sloop".

On 21 March 1812 Pioneer chased three smuggling gallies ashore between Deal and Walmer Castle. She was able to seize one, together with the spirits the galley was carrying. Small arms fire by persons on shore hit Pioneer's boat and prevented Pioneer from capturing either of the other two gallies. The Commissioners of His Majesty's Customs offered a reward of £200 for information leading to the capture and conviction of the men who had fired the shots. (Note: £200 was about the amount that an Ordinary Seaman in the Navy could earn in ten years.)

On 10 May Pioneer and Decoy captured the French privateer lugger Infatigable. She was six hours out of Boulogne and had made no captures. Of her crew of 29 men her captain was killed and 9 men were wounded before she struck.

On 11 September HMS Bermuda captured the French privateer lugger Bon Genie, that the cutters Pioneer and Dwarf were chasing. Bon Genie was pierced for 16 guns but only had four mounted. She had a crew of 60 men, and did not strike until she had lost three men killed and 16 wounded, most severely. She had left Boulogne the previous day and had not captured anything. (Note: Dwarf was a sister ship to Decoy. Decoy may have been in sight as she shared in the prize money.) (Note: Bon Génie, a 20-metre-long privateer from Boulogne, was commissioned in September 1810. Her first cruise from September 1810 to November 1810 was under Pierre-Antoine Hénin, with 84 men and 16 guns. She made two cruises from November 1810 to May 1811, and from September 1811 to March 1812, under Louis Delpierre. From September 1813, she was under Captain Picquendaire.)

On 30 December 1812 a French privateer captured Riga Merchant, of Sunderland, off Farleigh. The "Pioneer cutter" recaptured Riga Merchant the same day and sent her into Dover. His Majesty's Alert was in company.

On 7 September 1813 Decoy and Pioneer recaptured the English brig William.

On 15 June 1814 Morris was promoted to commander.

In June Lieutenant John Hill replaced Morris.

On 9 January 1815 the schooner Pioneer arrived at Falmouth, Cornwall. She had left Newfoundland 16 days earlier with a fleet, but had parted from the fleet in a gale that had forced her to throw 14 of her guns overboard. Then on 6 January a United States sloop-of-war or large privateer had chased her.

On 11 May the "Pioneer cutter" arrived at the Downs from the Scheldt. Pioneer was accompanied by a large schooner laden with gunpowder that Pioneer had detained.

In April 1815 Lieutenant John Wood Rouse replaced Hill.

On 24 May 1817 Pioneer seized the boat Blossom, and the spirits she was carrying. (Note: A first-class share of the proceeds, that of Lieutenant Rouse, was worth £95 16s 8d; a sixth-class share, that of an Ordinary Seaman, was worth £2 6s.)

On 1 June 1818 Pioneer, Lieutenant Rouse, captured the smuggling vessel De Wasp.

In December 1818 Lieutenant William Oldrey replaced Rouse. Pioneer was reconverted to a cutter in 1819. Between March 1819 and June 1820, Pioneer, Lieutenant Oldroy, made several seizures of smuggled goods. (Note: The first-class share for the five seizures was worth £34 11s 10 1/2d; the sixth-class share was worth £1 3 3/4d.)

On 5 May 1822 Pioneer towed into Hull Blessing, Robinson, master. Blessing had been on her way from Shields to London when Blessing ran on shore near Cromer and damaged her rudder.

== Coast Guard and fate ==
Between January 1823 and April 1824 Pioneer was at Plymouth being fitted for the Coast Blockade. She then served the Coast Guard to 1845. She was sold at Plymouth on 4 September 1849.
