= Warwick, Massachusetts =

- Town
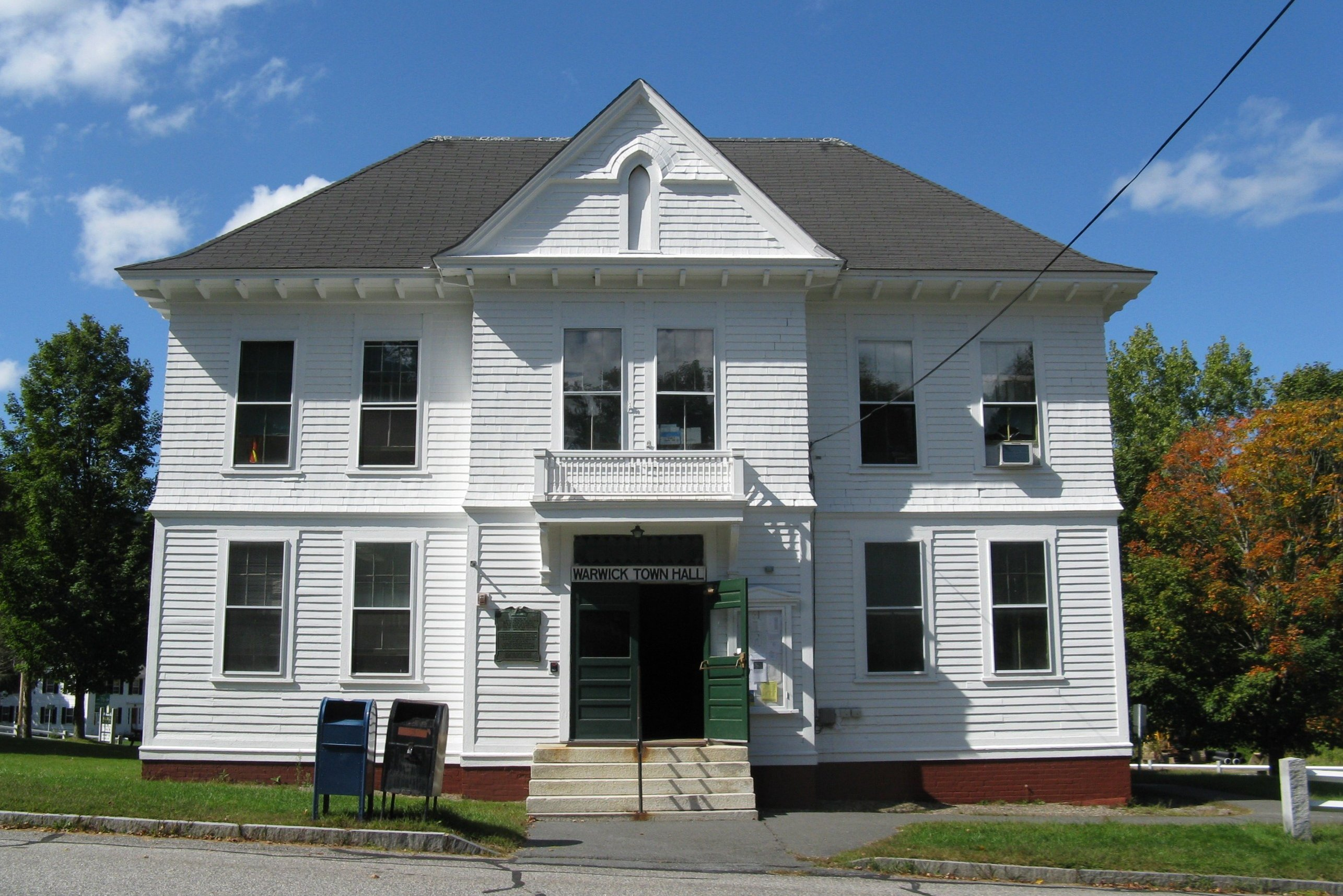
- Warwick Town Hall

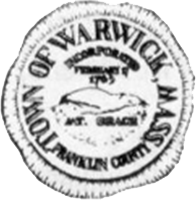
- Seal

- Location in Franklin County in Massachusetts
- Coordinates: 42°40′55″N 72°20′22″W
- Country: United States
- State: Massachusetts
- County: Franklin
- Settled: 1739
- Incorporated: 1763

Government
  - Type: Open town meeting

Area
  - Total: 37.6 sq mi (97.5 km^{2})
  - Land: 37.3 sq mi (96.7 km^{2})
  - Water: 0.31 sq mi (0.8 km^{2})
- Elevation: 922 ft (281 m)

Population (2020)
  - Total: 780
  - Density: 21/sq mi (8.1/km^{2})
- ZIP code: 01378
- Area code: 351 / 978
- FIPS code: 25-73265
- GNIS feature ID: 0618177
- Website: www.warwickma.org

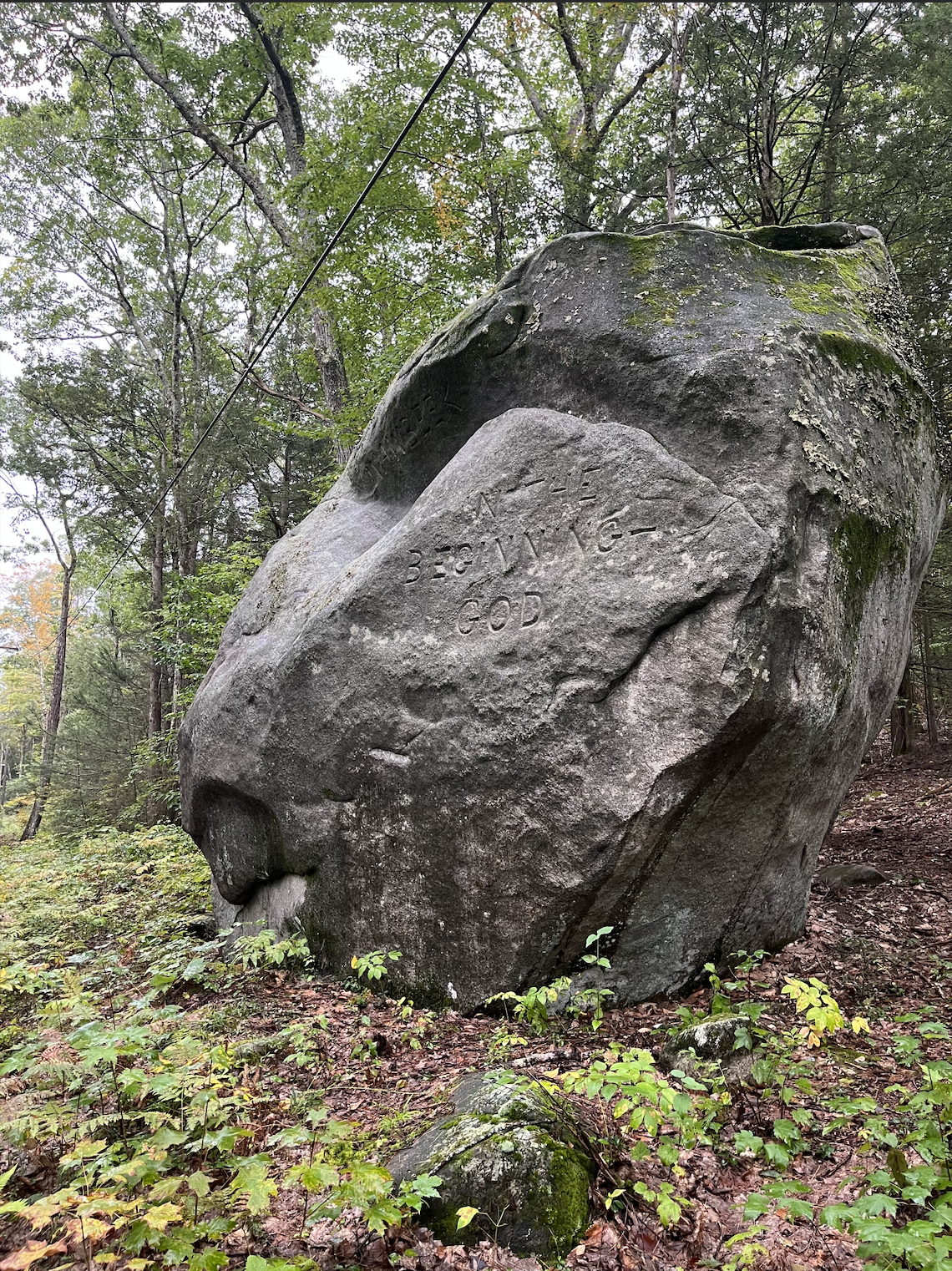
Photograph of "Wawbeek Rock" a large, glacial boulder located in Warwick, MA, engraved with the phrase "In The Beginning God" by a stonecutter around 1916.

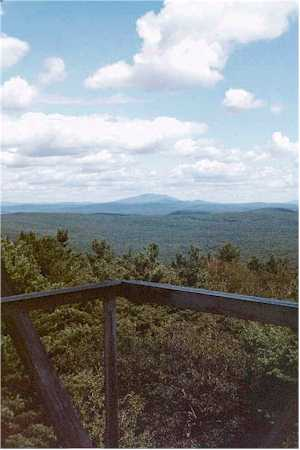
View from Mount Grace fire tower; Mount Monadnock visible in the distance

Warwick is a town in Franklin County, Massachusetts, United States. The population was 780 at the 2020 census. It is part of the Springfield, Massachusetts Metropolitan Statistical Area.

== History ==
Warwick was first settled in 1739 and was officially incorporated in 1763.

The land that became Warwick was one of four tracts of land established by Massachusetts in 1735 to compensate the descendants of the officers and soldiers who served during the "expedition to Canada" and the Battle of Quebec in 1690. The area was initially called Gardner's Canada and original proprietors were named in 1736. A 1737 owners list names the initial land owners, few of whom appear to have remained to settle the town once it was incorporated in 1763.

It took another 25 years to attract sufficient numbers of settlers to support a town and its minister. In 1760, such numbers were reached and the town hired a young Reverend Lemuel Hedge. The town was formed officially, as Warwick, on February 17, 1763. Its first officers were James Ball (town clerk), Moses Evans, Jeduthan Morse, James Ball (selectman and assessors), Amzi Doolittle (treasurer), Samuel Ball (constable), and James Ball (collector).

As the Revolutionary War approached, the town voted unanimously in favor of independence, although the town minister preached against it. Rev. Lemuel Hedge was barred from leaving the town in July 1775. He died October 15, 1777, the day British General Burgoyne surrendered his troops to the colonists in Saratoga. In 1776, Lieutenant Thomas Rich was selected to represent the town at the General Assembly of Massachusetts.

Shortly before and after the turn of the 19th century, many of Franklin County's old families began to move into Windham County, Vermont, in the generational quest for inexpensive land and frontiers to tame. Among those from Warwick was the Nathan Hastings family who settled in Windham, Vermont, in 1806. They were joined in Windham by others from adjacent villages such as Royalston and that part of Orange now known as the village of North Orange.

A significant event in Warwick's late 20th century history was the arrival of the Brotherhood of the Spirit Commune, which remained in the area through the 1960s and into the 1970s. The commune was led by Michael Metelica Rapunzel. The population of Warwick was only about 450 then, and hundreds of young people came to Warwick to join the commune. There was some friction in the early days, but townspeople and commune members gradually became more cooperative. The commune left Warwick for good in the 1980s.

== Geography and recreation ==
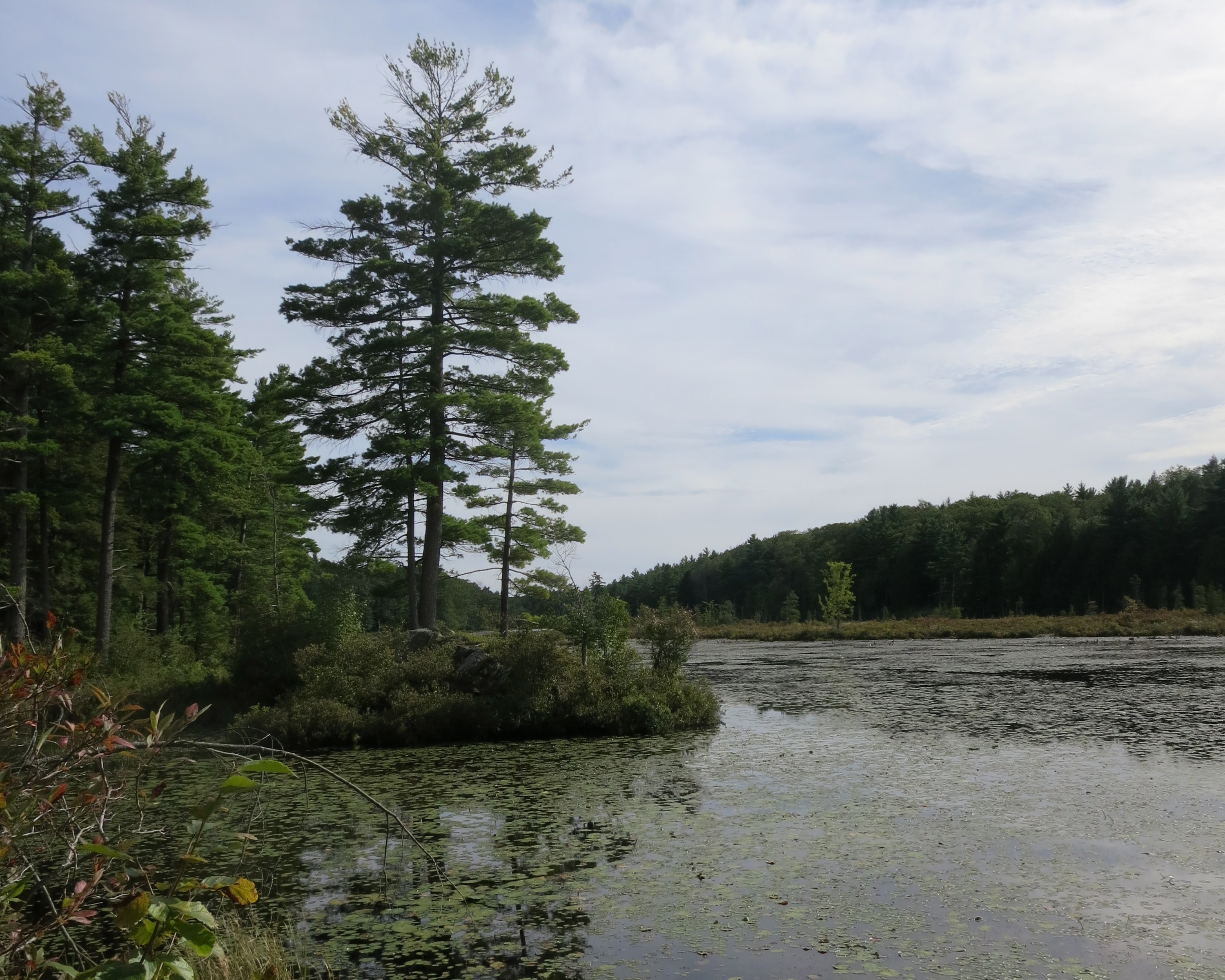
Richards Reservoir is a large wetland enhanced by an old man-made dam on its southern end and a beaver dam on its northern end

According to the United States Census Bureau, the town has a total area of 37.6 square miles (97.5 km^{2}), of which 37.3 square miles (96.7 km^{2}) is land and 0.31 square miles (0.8 km^{2}), or 0.83%, is water. The geography of Warwick is dominated by Mount Grace. This mountain is located in the center of town and has a network of hiking and cross-country ski trails. Most of the mountain is owned by the state (as part of Mount Grace State Forest) and open to the public. The Metacomet-Monadnock Trail passes over the 1617 foot (493m) summit. Approximately a third of the town's land is protected as part of the Warwick State Forest thereby offering a variety of outdoor activities for the public. There are several ponds, some created by dammed brooks in Warwick, including Moores Pond, Sheomet Lake, Laurel Lake, Wheeler Reservoir, Richards Reservoir, Hastings Pond and Stevens Swamp, a mosaic of wetlands. A small wildlife management area is also located within town. The Mount Grace Land Conservation Trust, which was founded by Warwick resident Keith Ross in 1986, pays homage to the mountain by dint of its name, though its land protection activities take place in 23 municipalities.

== Transportation ==
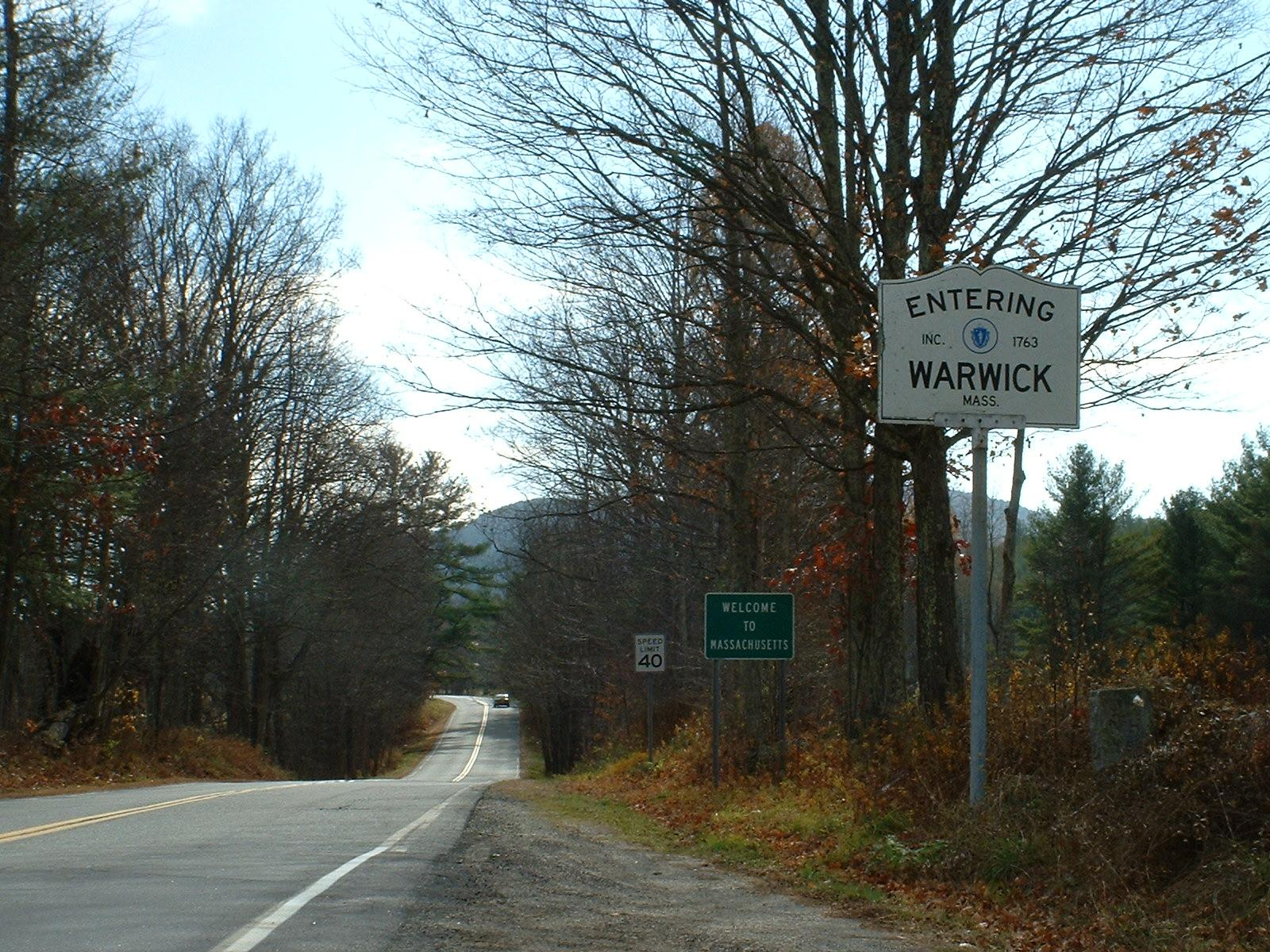
Entering Warwick from Winchester, NH, along Route 78

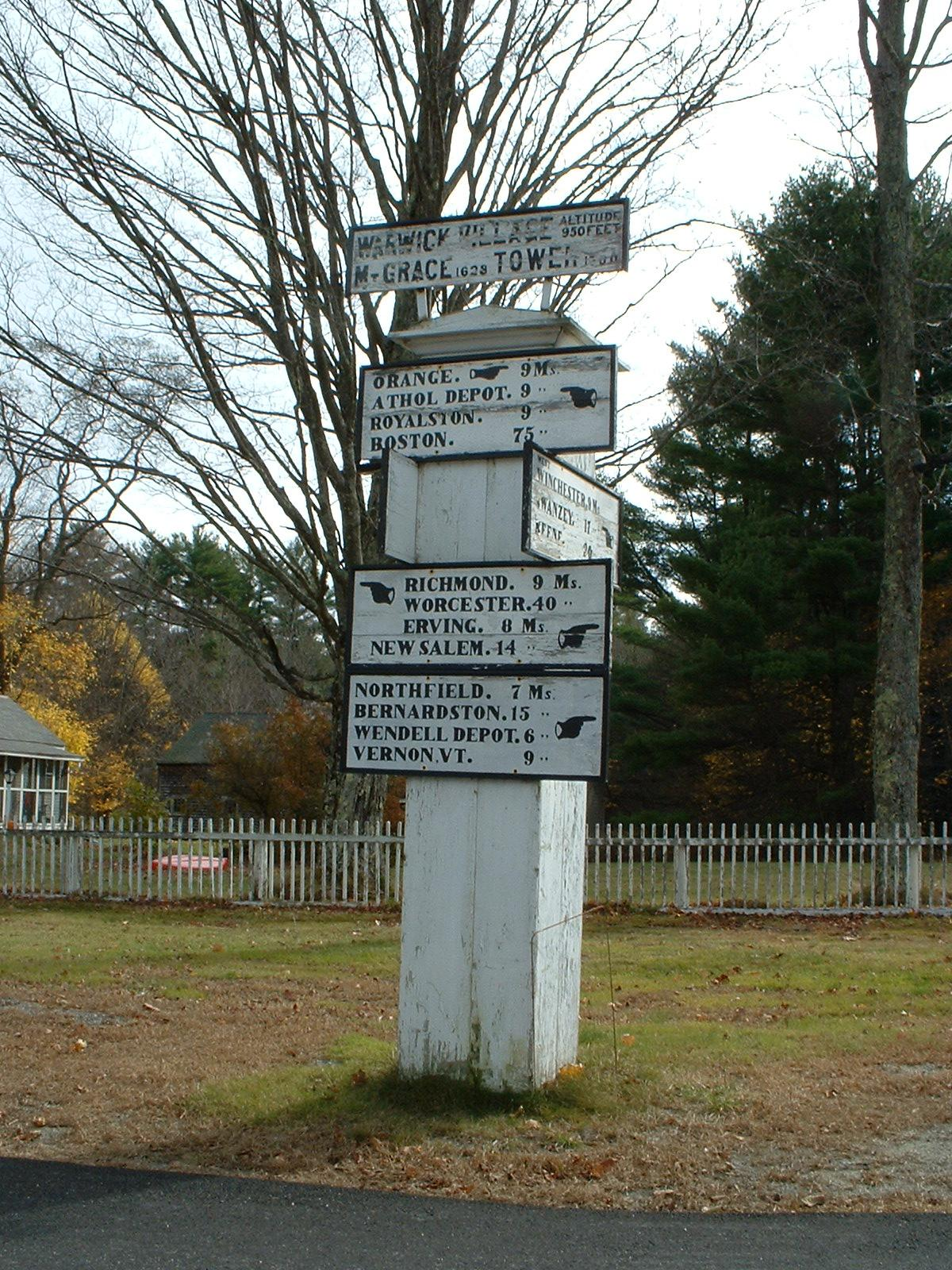
An antique signpost in Warwick village

Warwick lies along the borders of Worcester County, and Cheshire County, New Hampshire, in the northeastern corner of Franklin County. The town center lies nearly 10 miles (16 km) northwest of Athol, 20 miles (32 km) northeast of the county seat of Greenfield, 45 miles (72 km) northwest of Worcester, 49 miles (79 km) north-northeast of Springfield and 77 miles (124 km) west-northwest of Boston. Warwick is bordered by Winchester and Richmond, New Hampshire, to the north, Royalston (in Worcester County) to the east, Orange to the south and southeast, Erving to the southwest, and Northfield to the west.

Warwick is a fairly isolated town, located 13 miles (21 km) east of the nearest exit along Interstate 91 and 8 miles (13 km) north of Massachusetts Route 2, the major east–west route through northern Massachusetts. The only state highway through town is Route 78, which passes between Route 2A in Orange and into New Hampshire, heading towards New Hampshire Route 10. There is no rail or bus service within town, the nearest rail service being in Brattleboro, Vermont, along the Amtrak Vermonter line. The nearest small airport is the Orange Municipal Airport, with the nearest national air service at Logan Airport in Boston, Manchester-Boston Regional Airport in New Hampshire and Bradley International Airport in Connecticut, all of which are approximately 90 minutes away from the town.

== Economy ==
Warwick has home-based businesses. There are farms that produce grass-fed organic dairy products, herbal products, flowers, and vegetables and logging and a few wood shops.

Historical population
Year	Pop.	±%
1790	1,246	—
1800	1,233	−1.0%
1810	1,277	+3.6%
1820	1,256	−1.6%
1830	1,150	−8.4%
1840	1,071	−6.9%
1850	1,021	−4.7%
1860	932	−8.7%
1870	769	−17.5%
1880	713	−7.3%
1890	565	−20.8%
1900	619	+9.6%
1910	477	−22.9%
1920	327	−31.4%
1930	367	+12.2%
1940	444	+21.0%
1950	429	−3.4%
1960	426	−0.7%
1970	492	+15.5%
1980	603	+22.6%
1990	740	+22.7%
2000	750	+1.4%
2010	780	+4.0%
2020	780	+0.0%
2024*	774	−0.8%
* = population estimate. Source: United States census records and Population Estimates Program data.

== Demographics ==
As of the census of 2000, there were 750 people, 293 households, and 210 families residing in the town. The population density was 20.1 people per square mile (7.8/km^{2}). There were 343 housing units at an average density of 9.2 per square mile (3.6/km^{2}). The racial makeup of the town was 96.93% White, 0.27% Native American, 0.27% Asian, 1.07% from other races, and 1.47% from two or more races. Hispanic or Latino of any race were 0.93% of the population.

There were 293 households, out of which 32.1% had children under the age of 18 living with them, 59.4% were married couples living together, 8.9% had a female householder with no husband present, and 28.0% were non-families. 20.5% of all households were made up of individuals, and 5.8% had someone living alone who was 65 years of age or older. The average household size was 2.56 and the average family size was 2.99.

In the town, the population was spread out, with 24.7% under the age of 18, 6.8% from 18 to 24, 29.1% from 25 to 44, 28.4% from 45 to 64, and 11.1% who were 65 years of age or older. The median age was 41 years. For every 100 females, there were 102.7 males. For every 100 females age 18 and over, there were 99.6 males.

The median income for a household in the town was $42,083, and the median income for a family was $45,795. Males had a median income of $35,125 versus $26,875 for females. The per capita income for the town was $19,989. About 5.9% of families and 8.0% of the population were below the poverty line, including 7.6% of those under age 18 and 1.0% of those age 65 or over.
