= HMS Racer (1818) =

Cutter of the Royal Navy

History

United Kingdom
- Name: Racer
- Ordered: 1817
- Builder: Pembroke Dockyard
- Laid down: August 1817
- Launched: 3 June 1818
- Completed: 31 September 1819
- Fate: Broken up, 4 May 1830

General characteristics
- Class & type: Nightingale-class cutter
- Tons burthen: 122 bm
- Length: 63 ft 9 in (19.4 m) (gundeck); 47 ft (14.3 m) (keel)
- Beam: 22 ft 2 in (6.8 m)
- Draught: 10 ft 5 in (3.2 m)
- Depth: 9 ft 6 in (2.9 m)
- Sail plan: Fore-and-aft rig
- Complement: 34
- Armament: 2 × 6-pdr cannon; 4 × 6-pdr carronades

HMS Racer was a 6-gun Nightingale-class cutter built for the Royal Navy in 1818. She was broken up in 1830.

== Description ==
Racer had a length at the gundeck of 63 feet 9 inches (19.4 m) and 47 feet (14.3 m) at the keel. She had a beam of 22 feet 2 inches (6.8 m), a draught of about 10 feet 5 inches (3.2 m) and a depth of hold of 9 feet 6 inches (2.9 m). The ship's tonnage was 122 tons burthen. The Nightingale class was armed with two 6-pounder cannon and four 6-pounder carronades. The ships had a crew of 34 officers and ratings.

== Construction and career ==
Racer, the third ship of her name to serve in the Royal Navy, was ordered in 1817, laid down in August 1817 at Pembroke Dockyard, Wales, and launched on 4 April 1818. She was completed on 31 September 1819 at Plymouth Dockyard.
