= Mount Grace =

Mountain in Massachusetts, United States

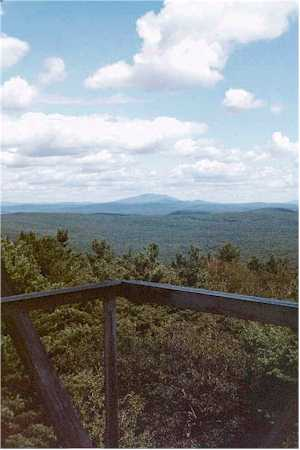
- View from Mount Grace firetower; Mount Monadnock visible in the distance

Highest point
- Elevation: 1,617 ft (493 m)
- Prominence: 682 ft (208 m)
- Coordinates: 42°41′28″N 72°21′18″W

Geography
- Location: Warwick, Massachusetts.
- Parent range: Upland plateau of central Massachusetts

Geology
- Rock age: 400 million yrs.
- Mountain type(s): monadnock; metamorphic rock

Climbing
- Easiest route: Metacomet-Monadnock Trail

Mount Grace, 1,617 feet (493 m), is a prominent monadnock located in north central Massachusetts in the town of Warwick, approximately two miles south of the New Hampshire border. The mountain is rugged and largely wooded, but a firetower on the summit provides expansive views of the surrounding rural countryside. Little Mount Grace, 1,226 feet (374 m), is the southern summit of the mountain. Mount Grace supports a predominantly northern hardwood forest as well as stands of red spruce near its summit.

The north side of Mount Grace drains into the Ashuelot River, thence into the Connecticut River, then Long Island Sound; the west side drains into the Connecticut River via Mill Brook; and the south and east sides drain into the Millers River, thence into the Connecticut River.

== History ==
Mount Grace is said to be named after Grace (Sarah) Rowlandson, the daughter of Mary Rowlandson, a Puritan colonist of Massachusetts, who died after she and her mother were captured by a combined force of allied Narragansett, Nipmuc, and Pocasset Native Americans during King Philip's War in 1676. However, the story that Mt. Grace is named after Mary Rowlandson's daughter named "Grace" and that her daughter is buried at Mt. Grace is not supported by records of the time. Mary's narrative names that her daughter is Sarah, not Grace. Sarah Rowlandson (not named Grace) is recorded in the Vital Records of Lancaster (p 12), born 15 Sept 1669, as named Sarah at birth. Mary's Narrative records that Sarah died at the Native encampment along the Ware River in New Braintree known as Menimesit or Wenimessett. There is a memorial stone for Sarah in North Cemetery in New Braintree, near the former site of the Native encampment.

== Picnic area ==
In the 1930s, the Civilian Conservation Corps built a picnic area on the west side of Route 78, at the bottom of the mountain, below the Gulch. The banks of the brook were walled with stone. The Corps also built a picnic area with stone fireplaces and grills, and road access to it. The hardwoods were thinned out, leaving only the White Pines.

In the 1980s, the State ceased maintaining the picnic area. Brush grew up. The area started the transition back to forest. By the late 1990s many of the big White Pines were dead. The State logged the area, and left the slash on the ground to help new trees grow.

The summit also has a small picnic area.

== Recreation and conservation ==
Mount Grace is located within the 1,458-acre (590 ha) Mount Grace State Forest. Hiking, backpacking, hunting, horseback riding, cross-country skiing, mountain biking, and snowshoeing are enjoyed on the mountain. The 114 mile (183 km) Metacomet-Monadnock Trail traverses the summit. A lean-to on the east side of the mountain is available for primitive camping.

In 2000, Mount Grace was included in a study by the National Park Service for possible inclusion in a new National Scenic Trail; tentatively in 2007 the project was on course to be called the New England National Scenic Trail, which would include the Metacomet-Monadnock Trail in Massachusetts, and the Mattabesett and Metacomet trails in Connecticut. In 2009 President Obama signed a bill making the M & M Trail part of the National Scenic Trail system.

The Mount Grace Land Conservation Trust, active in the area, takes its name from Mount Grace.

== Warwick Fire Tower ==
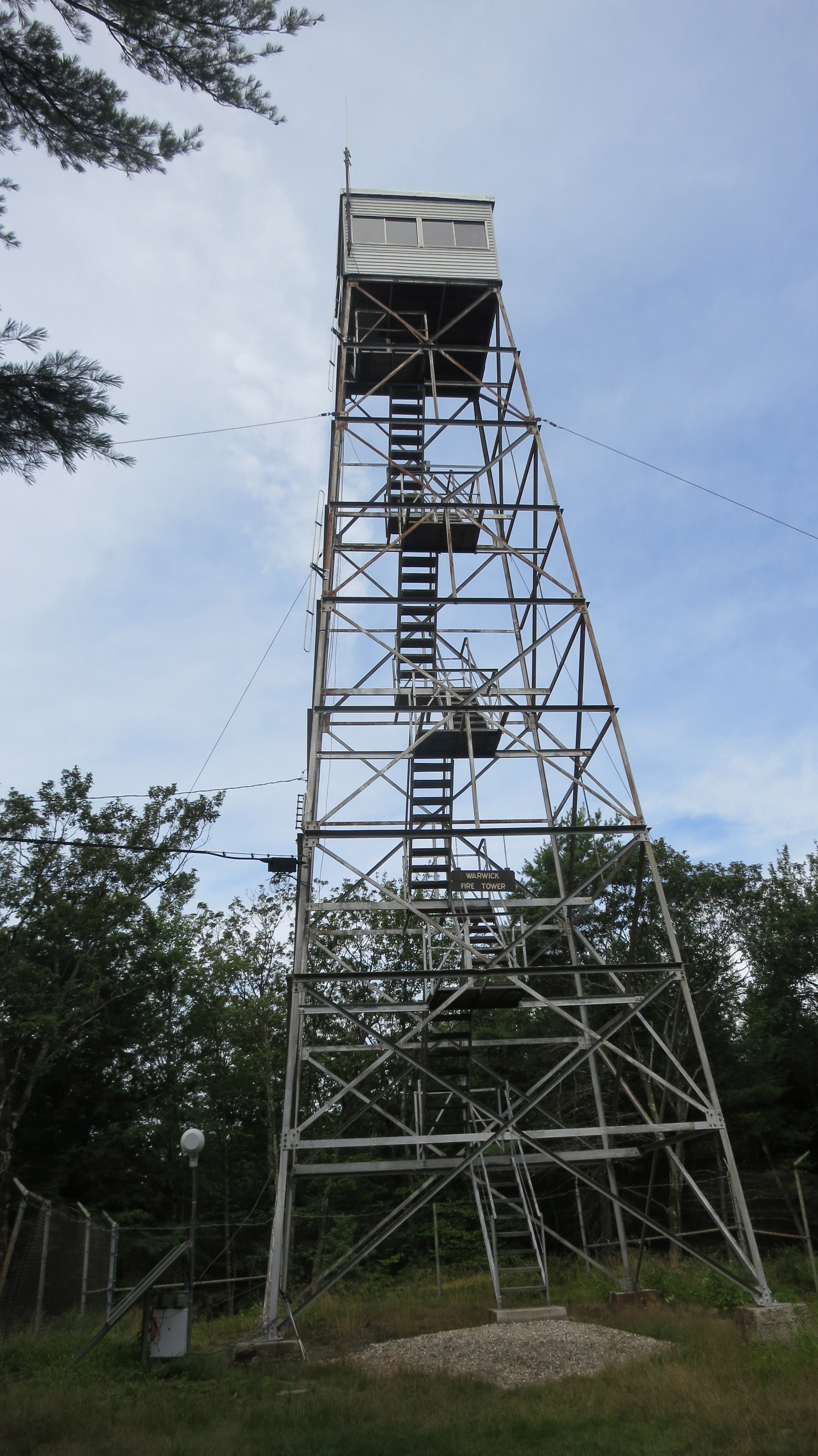
Warwick Fire Tower as seen in July 2013

Warwick Fire Tower is a fire lookout tower on the summit of the mountain. The first Warwick Fire Tower was a 40’ iron windmill type tower with a ladder and 6’x6’ cab built in 1911. It was replaced in 1920 with a 68’ iron tower that served until blown down by the 1938 hurricane. The present 68’ steel tower with 10’x10’ wooden cab was constructed in 1939. In spring of 2010, the fire tower was completely rehabilitated. It remains in service as an active state tower. It is staffed from March–May, and late August–October depending on fire danger. In 2004 this tower was listed on the National Historic Lookout Register as US 628, MA 39.
