= Decoy-class cutter =

Royal Navy cutter class

Class overview
- Name: Decoy class
- Operators: Royal Navy
- Planned: 3
- Completed: 3
- Lost: 3

General characteristics
- Type: Cutter
- Tons burthen: 20089/94 (bm)
- Length: 74 ft 4 in (22.66 m) (overall); 55 ft 10 5/8 in (17.0 m) (keel)
- Beam: 26 ft 0 in (7.9 m)
- Depth of hold: 11 ft 0 in (3.4 m)
- Propulsion: Sails
- Sail plan: Cutter
- Complement: 60
- Armament: 10 × 18-pounder carronades

The Decoy class was a class of three cutters of the Royal Navy. William Rule designed the class. Two were lost in wartime; they grounded, enabling the French to capture them. One was lost to bad weather.

- HMS Decoy (1810) participated in the capture of several small French privateers, captured or recaptured a number of merchant vessels, and captured a number of smuggling vessels. The French captured her in 1814.
- HMS Dwarf (1810) was wrecked on 3 March 1824.
- HMS Racer (1810) stranded on the French coast on 28 October, which enabled the French to capture her.
