= Mount Grace State Forest =

Massachusetts state forest

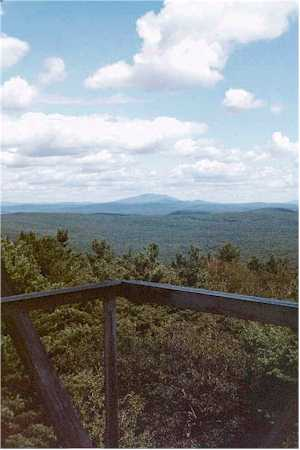
- View from the firetower on Mount Grace

- Location within Massachusetts Location within the United States
- Location: Warwick, Massachusetts, United States
- Coordinates: 42°41′29″N 72°21′18″W
- Area: 1,578 acres (639 ha)
- Elevation: 1,614 ft (492 m)
- Established: 1920
- Administrator: Massachusetts Department of Conservation and Recreation
- Website: Official website

Mount Grace State Forest is a publicly owned forest with recreational features located in the town of Warwick. The state forest centers around Mount Grace, which at 1,621 feet (494 m) is the third highest point in Massachusetts east of the Connecticut River after Mount Wachusett and Mount Watatic. It is bordered by portions of Warwick State Forest to the east and west and is managed by the Massachusetts Department of Conservation and Recreation.

== History ==
Mount Grace is said to be named after the baby daughter of Mary Rowlandson, a woman captured by Wompanoag warriors during King Philip's War, who according to legend buried her deceased infant at the foot of the mountain during the march to Canada.

By the turn of the 20th century, the mountain had been largely deforested, and conservationists, including former Warwick resident Dr. Paul W. Goldsbury, promoted the idea of having the state purchase it to create a state forest. Picnic and skiing facilities were built beginning in 1930, after legislation for the purchase passed in 1920. Crews with the Civilian Conservation Corps contributed summer and winter recreational features that included a 4.7 miles (7.6 km) snowshoeing trail.

The summit's 68-foot (21 m) fire lookout tower was built in 1939. It is accessible to the public and offers impressive views of the surrounding areas. It is the third tower to have been constructed on Mount Grace.

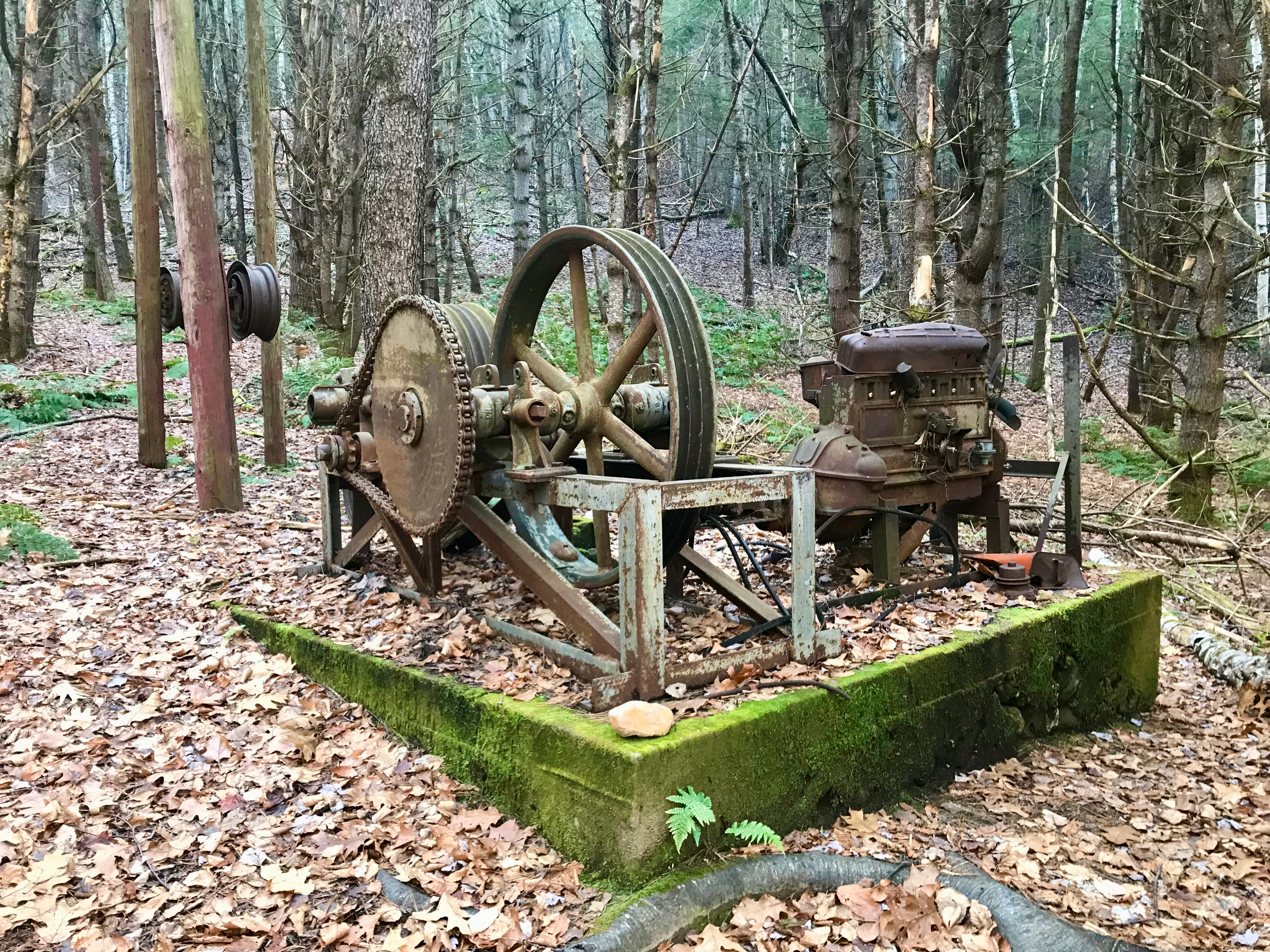
Ski lift remains

The remains of a ski lift can be found near the trail head and parking lot for the New England National Scenic Trail (and intersection with the Round the Mountain trail) close to MA-78.

== Activities and amenities ==
Forest trails used for hiking, horseback riding, mountain biking, and cross-country skiing include a portion of the long-distance Metacomet-Monadnock Trail (the Massachusetts section of the New England National Scenic Trail). The forest also offers picnicking and restricted hunting.
