= HMS Racer (1810) =

Cutter of the Royal Navy

History

United Kingdom
- Name: Racer
- Ordered: 2 October 1809
- Builder: William Baker, Sandgate
- Laid down: November 1809
- Launched: 24 April 1810
- Fate: Captured by the French 28 October 1810

General characteristics
- Class & type: Decoy-class cutter
- Type: Cutter
- Tons burthen: 20317/94 (bm)
- Length: Overall:75 ft 0 in (22.9 m); Keel:56 ft 1 3/4 in (17.1 m)
- Beam: 26 ft 1 in (8.0 m)
- Depth of hold: 11 ft 4 1/8 in (3.5 m)
- Propulsion: Sails
- Complement: 60
- Armament: 10 × 18-pounder carronades

HMS Racer was a Decoy-class cutter launched at Sandgate on 24 April 1810. Lieutenant Daniel Miller commissioned her, probably in May. The French captured her on 28 October when she stranded on the French coast.

== Capture ==
Lloyd's List reported on 9 November, based on a report from Dover the day before, that Racer had been lost on the French coast.

Lieutenant Daniel Miller had been ordered to patrol off the North Foreland to protect trade and annoy the enemy. On 25 October she chased a French lugger privateer over to the French coast, but lost her. Miller sighted two brigs on shore. A boat party captured and burnt one. As Racer maneuvered toward the other one along the shore the leadsman called out depths ranging from six to eight fathoms. When he called out five fathoms Miller had Racer put in stays, but it was too late and she grounded. He discovered that she was in three fathoms of water and had been in shallow water for some time. When the tide went out she heeled over on her side at 2a.m. In the morning French troops arrived and opened fire, fire that the British returned as best they could. By afternoon, Racer was still high and dry. As more French troops arrived, Miller had no choice but to strike. The court martial found that the leadsman had given false reports on the depth in order to cause the grounding. He, however, had disappeared after the wreck.
