= HMS Dwarf (1810) =

British naval cutter (1810–1824)

History

United Kingdom
- Name: HMS Dwarf
- Ordered: 2 October 1809
- Builder: James Lawes (or Lowes), Sandgate
- Laid down: November 1809
- Launched: 24 April 1810
- Fate: Wrecked 3 March 1824

General characteristics
- Class & type: Decoy-class cutter
- Type: Cutter
- Tons burthen: 20265/94 (bm)
- Length: Overall:74 ft 6 3/4 in (22.7 m); Keel:56 ft 0 1/8 in (17.1 m)
- Beam: 26 ft 1 in (8.0 m)
- Depth of hold: 11 ft 0 in (3.4 m)
- Propulsion: Sails
- Sail plan: Cutter
- Complement: 60
- Armament: 10 × 18-pounder carronades

HMS Dwarf was a Decoy-class cutter launched in 1810. She participated in the capture of a French privateer and in operations in the Gironde. After the end of the Napoleonic Wars she captured some smuggling vessels. She was wrecked in March 1824.

== Wartime service ==
Lieutenant Samuel Gordon commissioned Dwarf in March 1810 for the Downs.

On 5 September Dwarf recaptured Jusle.

On 2 March 1811, the master of the ship Mercury wrote a letter to the newspaper The Pilot that on 28 February his ship had fought off three French privateers near Dungeness. Bell wrote a letter to the newspaper, reprinted in the Naval Chronicle, that the supposedly French privateers vessels involved were HMS Phipps and Dwarf, and that the master had continued firing even after the British vessels had identified themselves. The fire from Mercury had wounded the sergeant of marines on Phipps. The only shots the naval vessels had fired were two musket shots to get Mercury to stop, and the only reason that the naval vessels had not fired their guns was because of the chance that Mercury was a British ship. Bell admonished all merchant captains to be a little more circumspect in the future.

On 22 August 1811 Dwarf recaptured New Galen.

When news of the outbreak of the War of 1812 reached Britain, the Royal Navy seized all American vessels then in British ports. Dwarf was among the Royal Navy vessels then lying at Spithead or Portsmouth and so entitled to share in the grant for the American ships Belleville, Janus, Aeos, Ganges and Leonidas seized there on 31 July 1812. (Note: A first-class share was worth £20 19s; a sixth-class share, that of an ordinary seaman, was worth 4s 1d; the Commander in Chief received £230 10s 8d.)

On 11 September 1812 Dwarf and Pioneer were in pursuit of a French privateer lugger when Bermuda joined them. When the lugger tried to cross Bermuda's bow, Bermuda fired several broadsides. Eventually the privateer struck to the boats of Dwarf and Pioneer after having suffered three men killed and 16 wounded, most severely. She was Bon Génie, of Boulogne. She was armed with 16 guns, but only four were mounted. She also had a crew of 60 men. She was one day out of Boulogne and had not taken anything. (Note: Bon Génie, a 20-metre-long privateer from Boulogne, was commissioned in September 1810. Her first cruise from September 1810 to November 1810 was under Pierre-Antoine Hénin, with 84 men and 16 guns. She made two cruises from November 1810 to May 1811, and from September 1811 to March 1812, under Louis Delpierre. From September 1813, she was under Captain Picquendaire.) Cordelia and Echo were in sight and so shared in the prize money.

On 4 November 1813 Dwarf captured the merchantman Charlotte and her cargo. (Note: A first-class share of the prize money was worth £ 949 6s 8d; a sixth-class share, that of an ordinary seaman, was worth £36 4s 3d.)

On 30 March 1814 Dwarf was in the British squadron that entered the Gironde. She later shared in the prize and head money for the squadron's activities on 2 and 6 April. (Note: For the activities on 2 April a first-class share was worth £54 18s 10d; a sixth-class share was worth 13s 7d. For the activities on 6 April a first-class share of the proceeds and head money was worth £69 6s 4 3/4d; a sixth-class share was worth 14s 5 3/4d.)

In January 1819 the London Gazette reported that Parliament had voted a grant to all those who had served under the command of Admiral Viscount Keith in 1812, between 1812 and 1814, and in the Gironde. Dwarf was listed among the vessels that had served under Keith in 1813 and 1814. (Note: The money was paid in three tranches. For someone participating in the first through third tranches, a first-class share was worth £256 5s 9d; a sixth-class share was worth £4 6s 10d. For someone participating only in the second and third tranches a first-class share was worth £202 6s 8d; a sixth-class share was worth £5 0s 5d.) She had also served under Kieth in the Gironde. (Note: The sum of the two tranches of payment for that service was £272 8s 5d for a first-class share; the amount for a sixth-class share was £3 3s 5d.)

== Post-war service ==
On 27 October 1816 Dwarf captured the smuggling vessel Venus. On 24 December Dwarf captured the smuggling vessel To Brothers. (Note: A first-class share of the prize money for the cargo on Venus was worth £168 18s 6d; a sixth-class share was worth £3 11s 4 1/2d. A first-class share of a portion of the prize money for Two Brothers was worth £118 18s 2 1/2d; a sixth-class share was worth £2 10s 6 3/4. A first-class share of the second payment for Two Brothers was worth £114 8s 4d; a sixth-class share was worth £2 8s 8d.)

On 26 March 1817 and 2 and 4 April seized a total of 3120 gallons of spirits. (Note: A first-class share of the payment for the spirits was worth £300 2s 6d; a sixth-class share was worth £6 11s 5d.)

Between October 1818 and January 1819 Dwarf was at Plymouth undergoing repairs and fitting. In November 1818 Lieutenant Nicholas Chapman recommissioned Dwarf. Lieutenant George Read replaced Chapman in command of Dwarf in November 1821.

In January 1823 Lieutenant Nicholas Gould took command of Dwarf.

== Fate ==
On 3 March 1824 Dwarf, Lieutenant Nicholas Gould, was in Kingstown Harbour, Dublin and secured to a mooring buoy. The weather looked threatening so Gould ordered precautions be taken. The gale built to the point that the cables to her anchors and the buoy parted. The wind drove her towards the shore until she collided with the Eastern Pier. The waves threw Dwarf repeatedly against the pier, battering her until she foundered. A marine died when he fell between Dwarf and the pier.
