= Mount Grace Land Conservation Trust =

Coordinates: 42°37′22.8″N 72°13′13.2″W

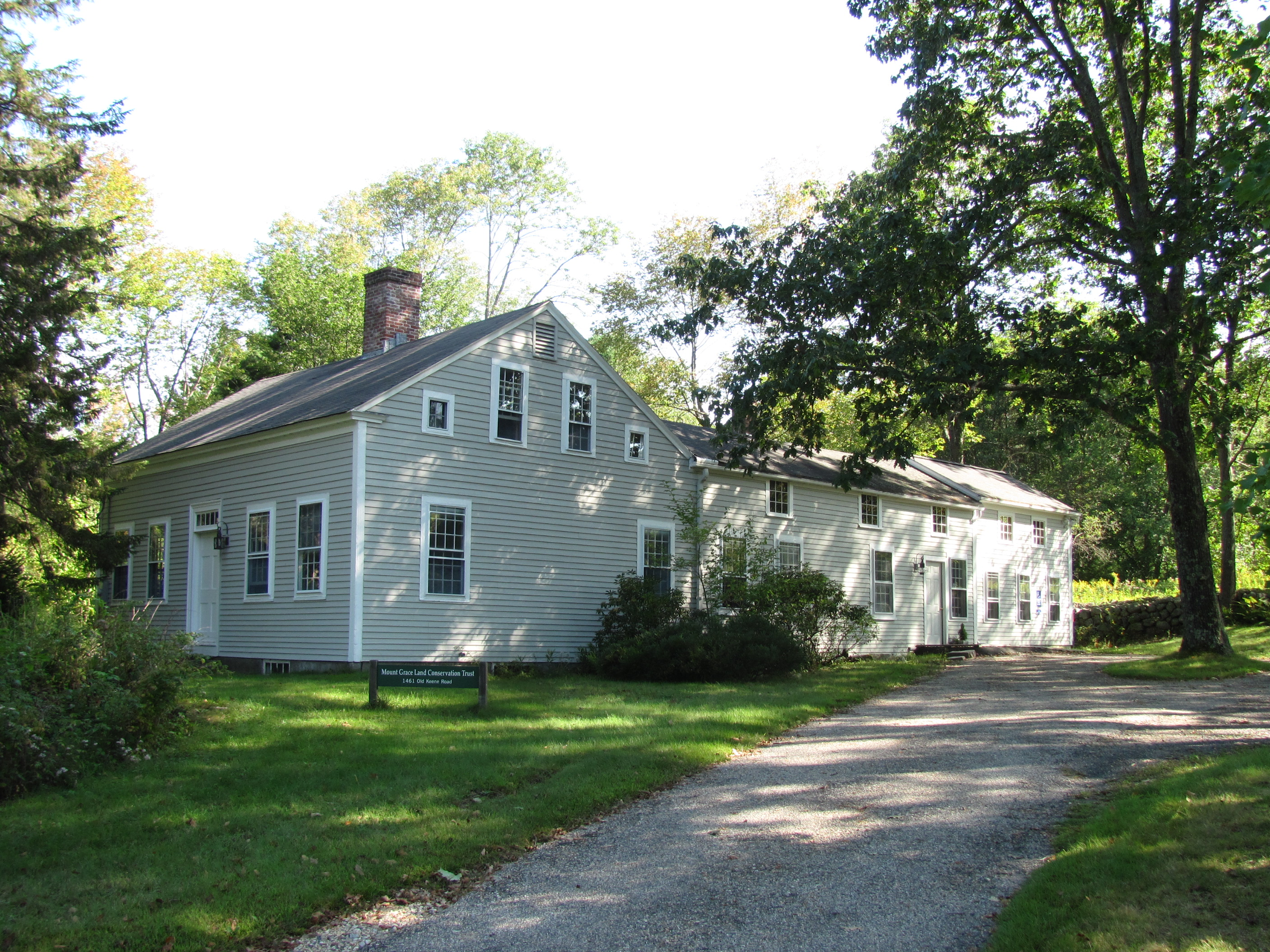
Headquarters in Athol

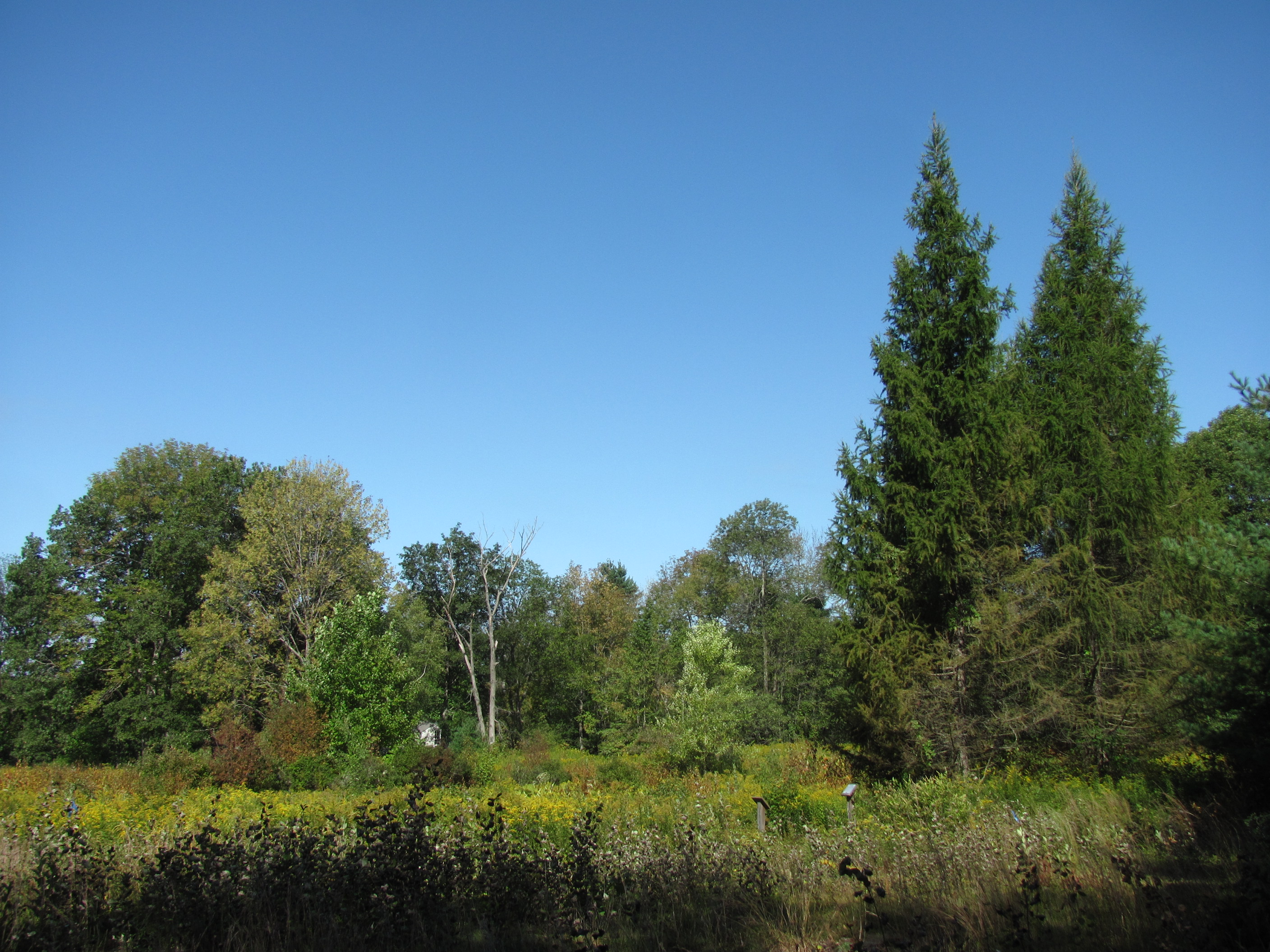
Skyfields Arboretum

Mount Grace Land Conservation Trust, incorporated in 1986, is a non-profit organization whose mission is the conservation of woodland and agricultural land in north central and western Massachusetts. Based out of Athol, Massachusetts, the MGLCT is named after Mount Grace, a nearby monadnock. As of August 2016, the trust had protected 31,559 acres by completing 335 projects."
