= List of peaks named Bear Mountain =

== United States ==
According to the USGS GNIS, the United States has 144 peaks named Bear Mountain:

=== Alaska ===
According to the USGS GNIS, the state of Alaska in the United States has 10 peaks named Bear Mountain:

Name	USGS link	State	County	Coordinates
Bear Mountain		Alaska	Kenai Peninsula	60°04′53″N 149°29′50″W
Bear Mountain		Alaska	Kenai Peninsula	60°26′21″N 150°05′48″W
Bear Mountain		Alaska	Nome (CA)	65°19′34″N 161°23′48″W
Bear Mountain		Alaska	Prince of Wales-Outer Ketchikan (CA)	55°05′20″N 133°12′07″W
Bear Mountain		Alaska	Sitka City and Borough	57°03′01″N 135°09′41″W
Bear Mountain		Alaska	Yukon-Koyukuk (CA)	63°20′00″N 160°20′00″W
Bear Mountain		Alaska	Yukon-Koyukuk (CA)	65°47′50″N 155°16′21″W
Bear Mountain		Alaska	Yukon-Koyukuk (CA)	65°59′41″N 142°49′15″W
Bear Mountain		Alaska	Yukon-Koyukuk (CA)	66°03′31″N 142°35′13″W
Bear Mountain		Alaska	Yukon-Koyukuk (CA)	68°24′33″N 142°04′21″W

=== Arkansas ===
Name	USGS link	State	County	Coordinates
Bear Mountain		Arkansas	Cleburne	35°37′23″N 092°04′03″W
Bear Mountain		Arkansas	Logan	35°13′45″N 093°20′50″W
Bear Mountain		Arkansas	Montgomery	34°29′00″N 093°37′22″W
Bear Mountain		Arkansas	Polk	34°28′48″N 094°06′39″W
Bear Mountain		Arkansas	Searcy	35°45′32″N 092°48′06″W

=== Arizona ===
Name	USGS link	State	County	Coordinates
Bear Mountain		Arizona	Gila	33°56′07″N 110°32′05″W
Bear Mountain		Arizona	Greenlee	33°32′00″N 109°08′38″W
Bear Mountain		Arizona	Yavapai	34°54′50″N 112°58′34″W
Bear Mountain		Arizona	Yavapai	34°55′07″N 111°53′01″W

=== California ===
Name	USGS link	State	County	Coordinates
Bear Mountain		California	Calaveras	38°01′10″N 120°34′58″W
Bear Mountain		California	Fresno	36°44′49″N 119°16′47″W
Bear Mountain		California	Fresno	37°05′46″N 119°05′36″W
Bear Mountain		California	Kern	35°12′18″N 118°38′14″W
Bear Mountain		California	Lake	39°24′24″N 122°54′00″W
Bear Mountain		California	Modoc	41°34′16″N 120°15′27″W
Bear Mountain		California	Monterey	36°09′31″N 121°22′32″W
Bear Mountain		California	Santa Clara	37°13′44″N 121°26′18″W
Bear Mountain		California	Shasta	40°43′33″N 122°15′29″W
Bear Mountain		California	Siskiyou	41°18′07″N 121°43′04″W
Bear Mountain		California	Siskiyou	41°47′47″N 123°40′15″W
Bear Mountain		California	Tulare	36°35′48″N 119°02′45″W
Bear Mountain		California	Tuolumne	37°51′19″N 119°53′19″W
Bear Mountain		California	Ventura	34°42′18″N 118°53′29″W

=== Colorado ===
According to the USGS GNIS, the state of Colorado in the United States has 10 peaks named Bear Mountain:

Name	USGS link	State	County	Coordinates
Bear Mountain		Colorado	Archuleta	37°10′44″N 106°51′25″W
Bear Mountain		Colorado	Douglas	39°22′08″N 105°08′38″W
Bear Mountain		Colorado	Fremont	38°27′23″N 105°39′39″W
Bear Mountain		Colorado	Grand	40°59′54″N 106°32′03″W
Bear Mountain		Colorado	Gunnison	39°02′07″N 107°06′40″W
Bear Mountain		Colorado	Hinsdale	37°26′13″N 107°21′43″W
Bear Mountain		Colorado	Jackson	40°46′58″N 106°36′40″W
Bear Mountain		Colorado	Larimer	40°39′37″N 105°23′52″W
Bear Mountain		Colorado	San Juan	37°47′41″N 107°43′56″W
Bear Mountain		Colorado	Summit	39°34′20″N 105°54′11″W

=== Connecticut ===
Name	USGS link	State	County	Coordinates
Bear Mountain		Connecticut	Fairfield	41°26′57″N 073°27′26″W
Bear Mountain		Connecticut	Litchfield	42°02′41″N 073°27′19″W

=== Idaho ===
Name	USGS link	State	County	Coordinates
Bear Mountain		Idaho	Bonner	48°18′31″N 116°04′02″W
Bear Mountain		Idaho	Custer	44°21′27″N 113°27′06″W
Bear Mountain		Idaho	Idaho	46°25′53″N 114°55′28″W

=== Maine ===
According to the USGS GNIS, the state of Maine in the United States has 11 peaks named Bear Mountain:

Name	USGS link	State	County	Coordinates
Bear Mountain		Maine	Aroostook	46°07′15″N 068°25′02″W
Bear Mountain		Maine	Oxford	44°09′24″N 070°42′32″W
Bear Mountain		Maine	Oxford	44°21′53″N 070°16′39″W
Bear Mountain		Maine	Oxford	44°26′56″N 070°57′20″W
Bear Mountain		Maine	Penobscot	45°15′43″N 068°17′30″W
Bear Mountain		Maine	Penobscot	45°18′21″N 068°05′45″W
Bear Mountain		Maine	Penobscot	46°01′21″N 068°39′21″W
Bear Mountain		Maine	Piscataquis	46°18′20″N 069°20′33″W
Bear Mountain		Maine	Somerset	44°40′12″N 069°45′07″W
Bear Mountain		Maine	Somerset	45°22′06″N 070°19′23″W
Bear Mountain		Maine	Washington	45°20′41″N 067°49′14″W

=== Massachusetts ===
Name	USGS link	State	County	Coordinates
Bear Mountain		Massachusetts	Franklin	42°29′10″N 072°51′08″W
Bear Mountain		Massachusetts	Franklin	42°35′10″N 072°23′40″W

=== Missouri ===
Name	USGS link	State	County	Coordinates
Bear Mountain		Missouri	Douglas	36°51′38″N 092°13′40″W
Bear Mountain		Michigan	Menominee	45°21′15″N 087°51′14″W
Bear Mountain		Missouri	Reynolds	37°03′17″N 090°47′22″W

=== Montana ===
Name	USGS link	State	County	Coordinates
Bear Mountain		Montana	Deer Lodge	45°54′38″N 113°00′27″W
Bear Mountain		Montana	Glacier	48°57′23″N 113°45′24″W
Bear Mountain		Montana	Jefferson	46°13′21″N 112°19′44″W
Bear Mountain		Montana	Meagher	46°13′01″N 110°33′43″W
Bear Mountain		Montana	Phillips	47°56′05″N 108°28′14″W

=== New Hampshire ===
Name	USGS link	State	County	Coordinates
Bear Mountain		New Hampshire	Carroll	44°01′49″N 071°18′09″W
Bear Mountain		New Hampshire	Cheshire	42°49′34″N 072°29′32″W
Bear Mountain		New Hampshire	Grafton	43°39′49″N 071°48′37″W
Bear Mountain		New Mexico	Catron	33°37′32″N 107°45′20″W

=== New Mexico ===
Name	USGS link	State	County	Coordinates
Bear Mountain		New Mexico	Colfax	36°27′51″N 105°05′41″W
Bear Mountain		New Mexico	Grant	32°50′09″N 108°21′29″W
Bear Mountain		New Mexico	Grant	33°01′21″N 108°49′45″W
Bear Mountain		New Mexico	San Miguel	35°40′09″N 105°29′04″W
Bear Mountain		New Mexico	Taos	36°06′15″N 105°36′22″W

=== North Carolina ===
Name	USGS link	State	County	Coordinates
Bear Mountain		North Carolina	Jackson	35°09′53″N 083°04′53″W
Bear Mountain		North Carolina	Wilkes	36°06′57″N 080°59′55″W

=== New York ===
Name	USGS link	State	County	Coordinates
Bear Mountain		New York	Clinton	44°28′49″N 073°54′50″W
Bear Mountain		New York	Essex	43°49′37″N 073°27′22″W
Bear Mountain		New York	Essex	43°51′46″N 073°38′43″W
Bear Mountain		New York	Essex	44°03′02″N 073°43′16″W
Bear Mountain		New York	Hamilton	43°24′33″N 074°24′18″W
Bear Mountain		New York	Orange	41°18′46″N 074°00′24″W
Bear Mountain		New York	St. Lawrence	44°10′11″N 074°44′09″W
Bear Mountain		New York	St. Lawrence	44°11′45″N 074°48′43″W
Bear Mountain		New York	St. Lawrence	44°18′28″N 074°57′15″W
Bear Mountain		New York	St. Lawrence	44°31′22″N 074°38′37″W
Bear Mountain		New York	Warren	43°24′05″N 073°55′12″W

=== Oklahoma ===
Name	USGS link	State	County	Coordinates
Bear Mountain		Oklahoma	Latimer	34°49′06″N 095°06′56″W
Bear Mountain		Oklahoma	McCurtain	34°09′23″N 094°55′32″W

=== Oregon ===
Name	USGS link	State	County	Coordinates
Bear Mountain		Oregon	Douglas	43°11′20″N 123°39′07″W
Bear Mountain		Oregon	Jackson	42°39′06″N 122°45′29″W
Bear Mountain		Oregon	Lane	43°30′54″N 122°14′08″W
Bear Mountain		Oregon	Lane	43°50′35″N 122°53′25″W
Bear Mountain		Oregon	Lane	43°56′11″N 122°38′05″W
Bear Mountain		Oregon	Wallowa	45°21′51″N 116°41′51″W
Bear Mountain		Oregon	Wheeler	44°21′33″N 119°49′59″W

=== Pennsylvania ===
Name	USGS link	State	County	USGS map	Coordinates	Elevation	
Bear Mountain		Pennsylvania	Adams	Arendtsville	39°57′55″N 077°17′58″W	1,601 ft	488 m
Bear Mountain		Pennsylvania	Carbon	Lehighton	40°52′25″N 075°41′59″W	1,673 ft	510 m
Bear Mountain		Pennsylvania	Centre	Woodward	40°53′54″N 077°17′50″W	1,870 ft	570 m
Bear Mountain		Pennsylvania	Monroe	Pocono Pines	41°05′15″N 075°22′58″W	1,942 ft	592 m
Bear Mountain		Pennsylvania	Schuylkill	Tower City	40°36′45″N 076°36′48″W	1,627 ft	496 m
Bear Mountain		Pennsylvania	Sullivan	Hillsgrove	41°29′19″N 076°40′34″W	2,005 ft	611 m

=== Texas ===
Name	USGS link	State	County	Coordinates
Bear Mountain		Texas	Eastland	32°29′00″N 098°30′43″W
Bear Mountain		Texas	Gillespie	30°19′34″N 098°51′27″W
Bear Mountain		Texas	Jack	33°02′37″N 098°25′08″W
Bear Mountain		Texas	Jack	33°23′40″N 098°12′13″W
Bear Mountain		Texas	Jeff Davis	30°40′30″N 104°15′04″W
Bear Mountain		Texas	Jeff Davis	30°47′59″N 103°59′42″W
Bear Mountain		Texas	Llano	30°40′03″N 098°45′10″W

=== Virginia ===
Name	USGS link	State	County	Coordinates
Bear Mountain		Virginia	Amherst	37°34′56″N 079°08′13″W
Bear Mountain		Virginia	Highland	38°20′12″N 079°32′55″W
Bear Mountain		Virginia	Highland	38°26′48″N 079°41′27″W

=== Vermont ===
Name	USGS link	State	County	Coordinates
Bear Mountain		Vermont	Bennington	43°12′03″N 073°10′02″W
Bear Mountain		Vermont	Essex	44°38′01″N 071°34′45″W
Bear Mountain		Vermont	Rutland	43°28′13″N 072°56′21″W
Bear Mountain		Vermont	Rutland	43°36′27″N 072°48′18″W
Bear Mountain		Vermont	Windsor	43°30′36″N 072°46′22″W
Bear Mountain		Vermont	Windsor	43°52′13″N 072°57′20″W

=== Washington ===
According to the USGS GNIS, the state of Washington in the United States has 9 peaks named Bear Mountain.

Name	USGS link	State	County	USGS map	Coordinates	Elevation	
Bear Mountain		Washington	Stevens	Turtle Lake	47°58′11″N 118°04′06″W	3,445 ft	1,050 m
Bear Mountain		Washington	Whatcom	Mount Redoubt	48°55′49″N 121°20′29″W	7,877 ft	2,401 m
Bear Mountain		Washington	Pacific	Knappton	46°17′51″N 123°49′12″W	1,014 ft	309 m
Bear Mountain		Washington	Clallam	Mount Zion	47°57′38″N 123°04′00″W	3,412 ft	1,040 m
Bear Mountain		Washington	Chelan	Winesap	47°49′56″N 120°09′56″W	3,566 ft	1,087 m
Bear Mountain		Washington	Okanogan	Loup Loup Summit	48°24′47″N 119°55′23″W	5,446 ft	1,660 m
Bear Mountain		Washington	Ferry	Bear Mountain	48°31′46″N 118°38′08″W	4,580 ft	1,400 m
Bear Mountain		Washington	Snohomish	Evergreen Mountain	47°52′19″N 121°21′24″W	5,364 ft	1,635 m
Bear Mountain		Washington	Whatcom	Cavanaugh Creek	48°39′38″N 122°01′17″W	4,209 ft	1,283 m

=== Wyoming ===
Name	USGS link	State	County	Coordinates
Bear Mountain		Wyoming	Big Horn	44°22′17″N 107°25′57″W
Bear Mountain		Wyoming	Carbon	41°04′30″N 106°37′09″W
Bear Mountain		Wyoming	Carbon	42°14′19″N 107°05′37″W
Bear Mountain		Wyoming	Goshen	41°40′34″N 104°16′57″W
Bear Mountain		Wyoming	Natrona	42°26′10″N 106°32′28″W

=== Other states ===
These are states that have only one peak named Bear Mountain.

Name	USGS link	State	County	Coordinates
Bear Mountain		Alabama	St. Clair	33°46′05″N 086°31′34″W
Bear Mountain		Georgia	Cherokee	34°18′48″N 084°38′53″W
Bear Mountain		Kentucky	Madison	37°32′10″N 084°15′29″W
Bear Mountain		Nevada	Elko	41°55′21″N 114°54′20″W
Bear Mountain		South Dakota	Pennington	43°52′12″N 103°44′37″W
Bear Mountain		West Virginia	Pocahontas	38°26′49″N 079°41′30″W
