= Bear Mountain =

Bear Mountain may refer to:

== Mountains ==
- Bear Mountain (Seward, Alaska), in the Kenai Mountains
- Bear Mountain (Loy Butte, Arizona), near Sedona, Arizona
- Bear Mountain (Kern County, California), located in the Tehachapi Mountains
- Bear Mountain (Santa Clara County, California), located in the Diablo Range
- Bear Mountain (Siskiyou County, California), located in the Siskiyou Mountains
- Bear Mountain (San Juan County, Colorado), located in the San Juan Mountains
- Bear Mountain (Connecticut), located in the southern Taconic Mountains
- Bear Mountain (Georgia), located in the Appalachian Mountains
- Bear Mountain (Glacier County, Montana), located in the northern Lewis Range
- Bear Mountain (New Hampshire), located in the White Mountains
- Bear Mountain (Hudson Highlands), in New York State
- Bear Mountain (Carbon County, Pennsylvania), located in the Lehigh Valley
- Bear Mountain (South Dakota), located in the Black Hills

== Other uses ==
- Bear Mountain (resort), a golf resort community in Greater Victoria, British Columbia, Canada
- Bear Mountain (ski area), a ski resort in southern California
- Bear Mountain, West Virginia, unincorporated community in Barbour County
- Bear Mountain (band), Canadian indie band

== See also ==
- Bare Mountain (disambiguation)
- Bear Mountains, in New Mexico
- Bear Mountain Ski Hill, near Dawson Creek, British Columbia
- Bear Mountain State Park, containing the New York mountain
- Bear Mountain Bridge, in New York State
- Bear Mountain Inn, in New York State
