= J. P. Walker =

American snowboarder (born 1976)

JP Walker
- Born: October 16, 1976 (age 49) Salt Lake City, Utah, U.S.
- Occupation: Snowboarder

John Paul Walker, or JP (born October 16, 1976), nicknamed "the Don", is a professional snowboarder from Salt Lake City, Utah. In the late 1990s he was instrumental in reviving the jib movement.

Walker has been recognized with various awards including Snowboarder magazine's Rider of the Year list six times (more than any other rider in history), European magazine Onboard's Jibber of All Time, and his peers voted him for multiple awards in Transworld Snowboarding magazine’s Rider’s Poll.

Over the course of his career, Walker has produced 17 video parts in many of snowboarding's highest-grossing films. In 2009, he filmed a 100% switch part (riding the opposite way that he naturally does) for This Video Sucks, an accomplishment nobody before him had achieved. Most recently Walker filmed a segment in the movie Good Look from the production company People.

Walker has appeared in magazines from around the globe. His exposure includes both mainstream publications like, Men's Fitness and Complex and action sports magazines like Snowboarder and Transworld Surf.

In 2009, ESPN published a feature titled Being JP Walker, highlighting his influence on snowboarding culture and describing him as one of the sport’s most transformative riders.

Walker guest-edited the February 2010 issue of Snowboarder alongside long-time friend and pro rider, Jeremy Jones.

In 2012, Walker released his full part from the iconic film Jibberish and discussed its legacy and influence in an interview with espn.

Walker's ultimate goal is to continue to push the progression of snowboarding to unexpected heights, primarily through his passion and dedication to the sport.

In 2023, Walker rejoined the Forum brand which was restarted by former teammate Peter Line.

== Sponsors ==
Thirtytwo/Etnies, Forum Snowboards, Nixon, Oakley, Dakine, Bear Mountain, Milosport, Vertra Suncare, dbot 5 and Raw Rev.

== Achievements ==
- Voted Jibber of the Year in Snowboarder magazine’s Top 10 three years in a row
- Named one of Snowboarder’s Top 10 Riders six times
- Awarded multiple times in Transworld Snowboarding’s Rider’s Poll: SIA Retailer’s Choice, Best Rail Rider, Best Freestyle Rider, Best Video Part
- Listed as one of Snowboarder magazine’s Top 20 Most Influential Riders
- Onboard magazine’s Jibber of All Time
- Recipient of Method magazine's "Eternal Radness" Award
- Numerous signature products with sponsoring brands
- Countless never before done tricks like switch frontside 450 to boardslide and frontside double cork

== Media appearances ==
- Made an appearance on NBC's Today Show because he was the chosen hero of the son of a victim of 9/11
- Gatefold cover of Future Snowboarding magazine (January 2008)
- Cover of Snowboard magazine (February 2008)
- Profiled in Men’s Fitness (March 2008)
- Cover and 8 page interview in Transworld Snowboarding magazine (November 2008)
- Appeared on Fuel TV’s The Daily Habit (September 2009)
- Filmed 100% switch part in This Video Sucks (September 2009)
- Featured in ESPN Rise (September 2009)

== Videography ==
- Mainstream/1994
- Something Goin' On/1995
- Forward Into Battle/1995
- Warriors/Kingpin Productions/1995
- Gas Money/1996
- Kingpin Chronicles/Kingpin Productions/1996
- Simple Pleasures/MDP/1997
- Decade/MDP/1998
- Technical Difficulties/MDP/1999
- The Resistance/MDP/2000
- True Life/MDP/2001
- Nixon Jib Fest/MDP/2002
- Shakedown/MDP/2003
- Chulksmack/MDP/2004
- That/Forum/2006
- Double Decade/MDP/2008
- This Video Sucks/Stepchild/2009
- Cheers/People/2010
- Good Look/People/2011
- Jibberish Vol.1
- Jibberish Vol.2
- 2032/The ThirtyTwo Movie/2015
