= Grand Turk (Colorado) =

Mountain in San Juan County, Colorado, US

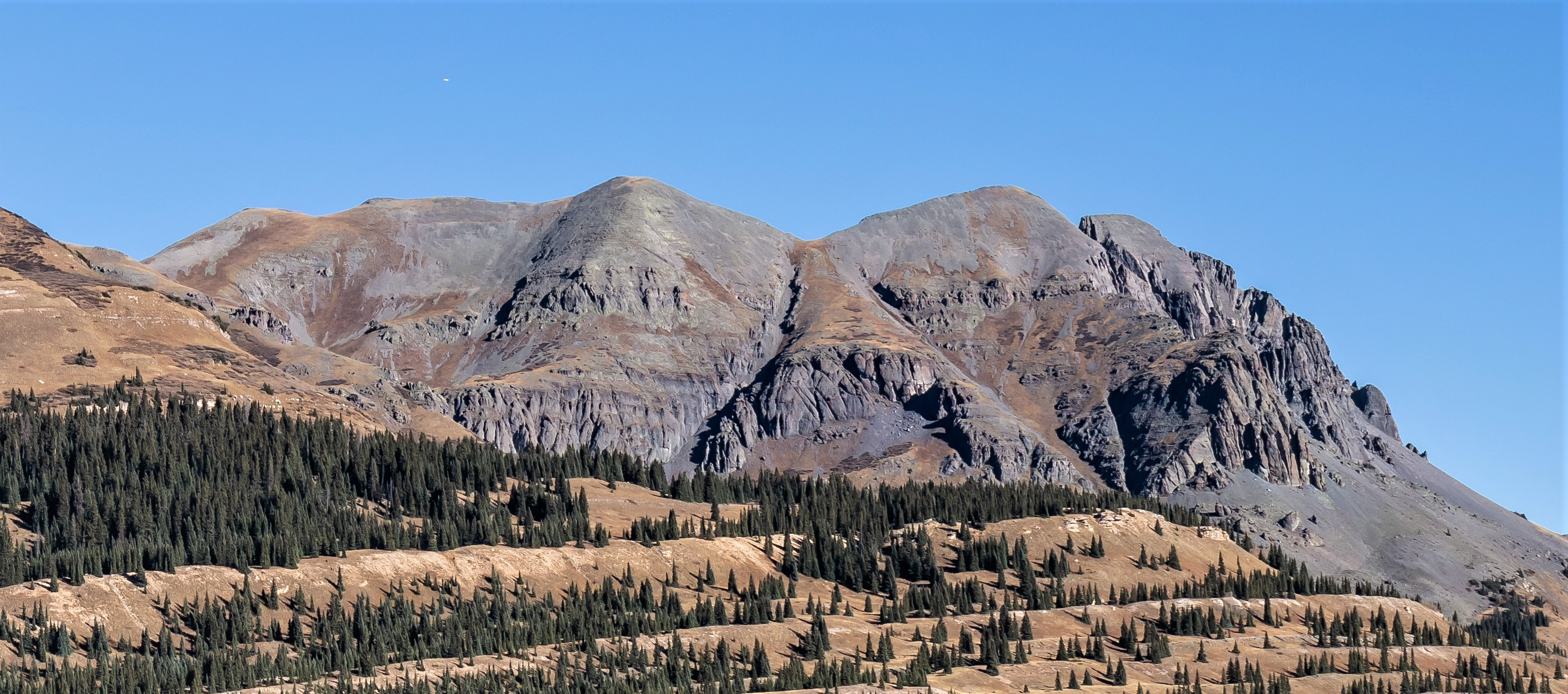
- South aspect

Highest point
- Elevation: 13,167 ft (4,013 m)
- Prominence: 385 ft (117 m)
- Parent peak: Sultan Mountain (13,373 ft)
- Isolation: 0.67 mi (1.08 km)
- Coordinates: 37°46′38″N 107°41′52″W

Geography
- Location within Colorado Location within the United States
- Country: United States
- State: Colorado
- County: San Juan County
- Parent range: Rocky Mountains; San Juan Mountains
- Topo map: USGS Silverton

Climbing
- Easiest route: class 2 hiking

Grand Turk is a 13,167-foot-elevation (4,013-meter) mountain summit in San Juan County, Colorado, United States. It is located three miles (4.8 km) southwest of the community of Silverton, on land managed by San Juan National Forest. Grand Turk is eight miles (13 km) west of the Continental Divide in the San Juan Mountains which are a subrange of the Rocky Mountains. Grand Turk is visible from viewpoints along Highway 550. Precipitation runoff from the mountain drains into tributaries of the Animas River. Topographic relief is significant as the summit rises nearly 4,000 feet (1,200 meters) above the river in 1.75 mile (2.82 km). Neighbors include Bear Mountain, 2.25 miles (3.62 km) to the northwest, and line parent Sultan Mountain, 0.67 mile (1.08 km) to the north-northwest. The mountain's toponym has been officially adopted by the United States Board on Geographic Names, and has been recorded in publications since at least 1901.

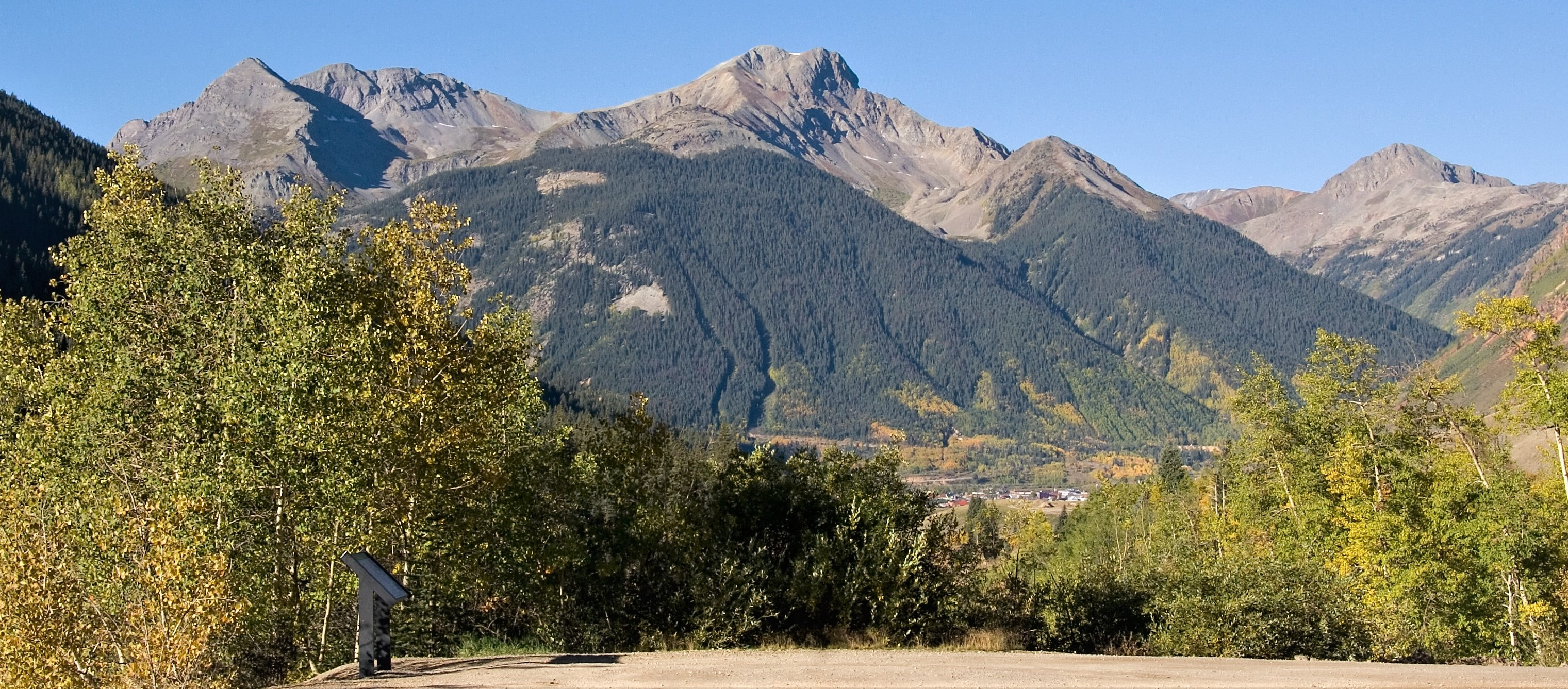
Grand Turk (left), Sultan Mountain (center), and Bear Mountain (right) viewed from northeast.

== Climate ==
According to the Köppen climate classification system, Grand Turk is located in an alpine subarctic climate zone with long, cold, snowy winters, and cool to warm summers. Due to its altitude, it receives precipitation all year, as snow in winter, and as thunderstorms in summer, with a dry period in late spring.

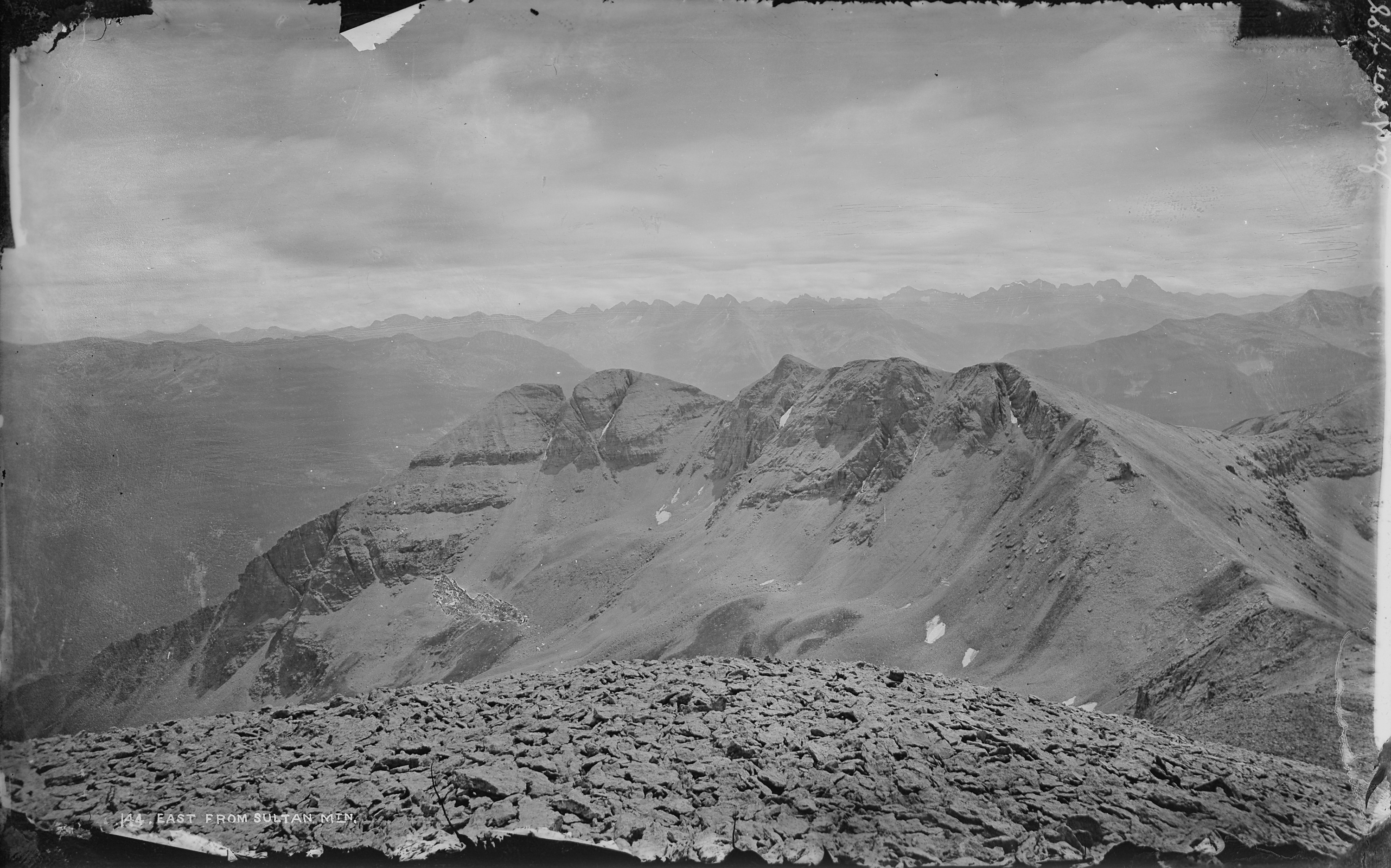
Historic 1874 image of Grand Turk seen from Sultan Mountain

== See also ==
- Thirteener
- Mountains of San Juan County, Colorado
