= Sultan Mountain =

Mountain in Colorado, United States

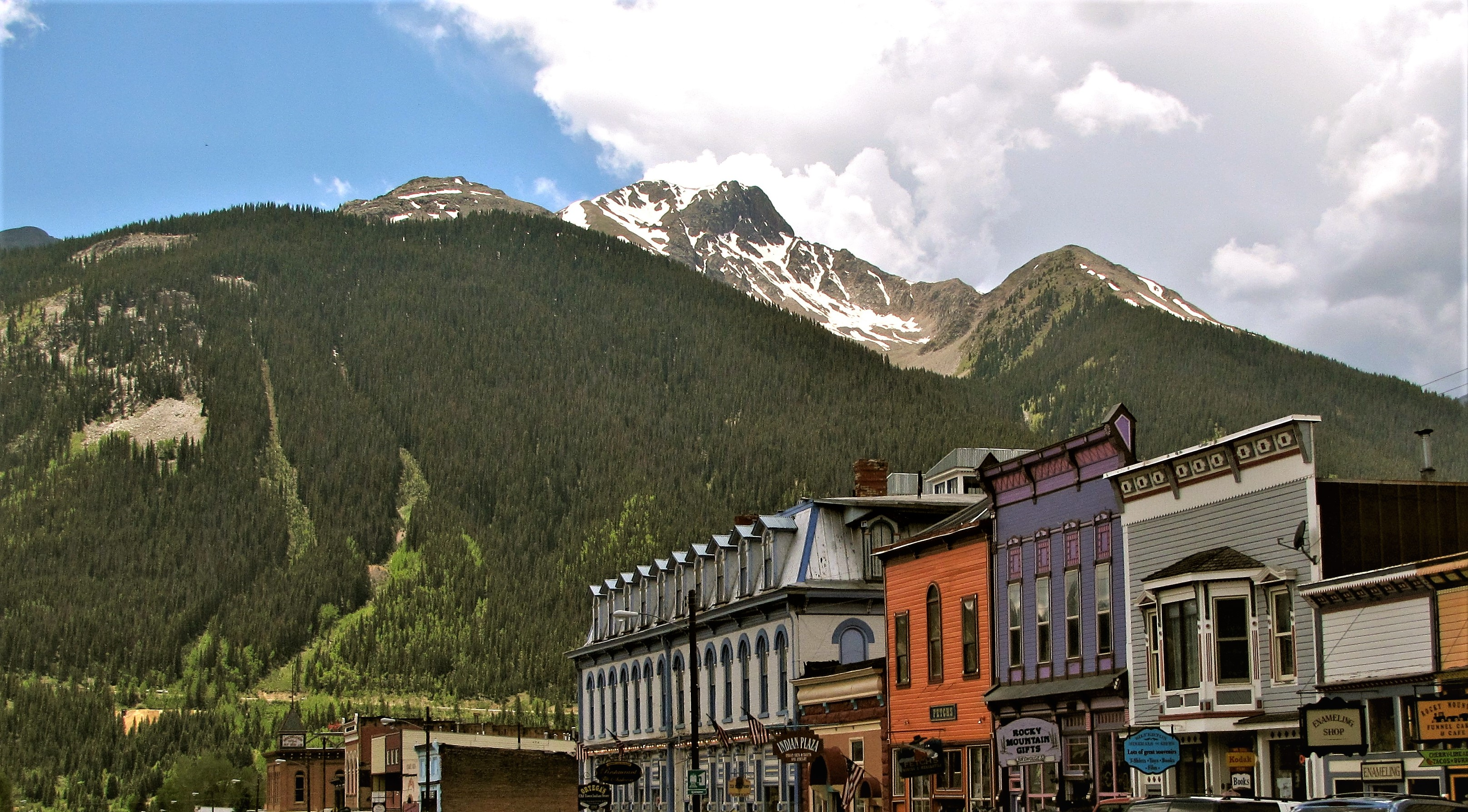
- Sultan Mountain viewed from downtown Silverton

Highest point
- Elevation: 13,373 ft (4,076 m)
- Prominence: 1,868 ft (569 m)
- Isolation: 4.59 mi (7.39 km)
- Listing: North America highest peaks 100th; US highest major peaks 83rd; Colorado highest major peak 43rd
- Coordinates: 37°47′09″N 107°42′14″W

Geography
- Location within Colorado
- Location: San Juan County, Colorado, U.S.
- Parent range: San Juan Mountains
- Topo map(s): USGS 7.5' topographic map Silverton, Colorado

Sultan Mountain, elevation 13,373 ft (4,076 m), is a peak of the San Juan Mountains range in San Juan County, southwestern Colorado.

It is located southwest of the town of Silverton.

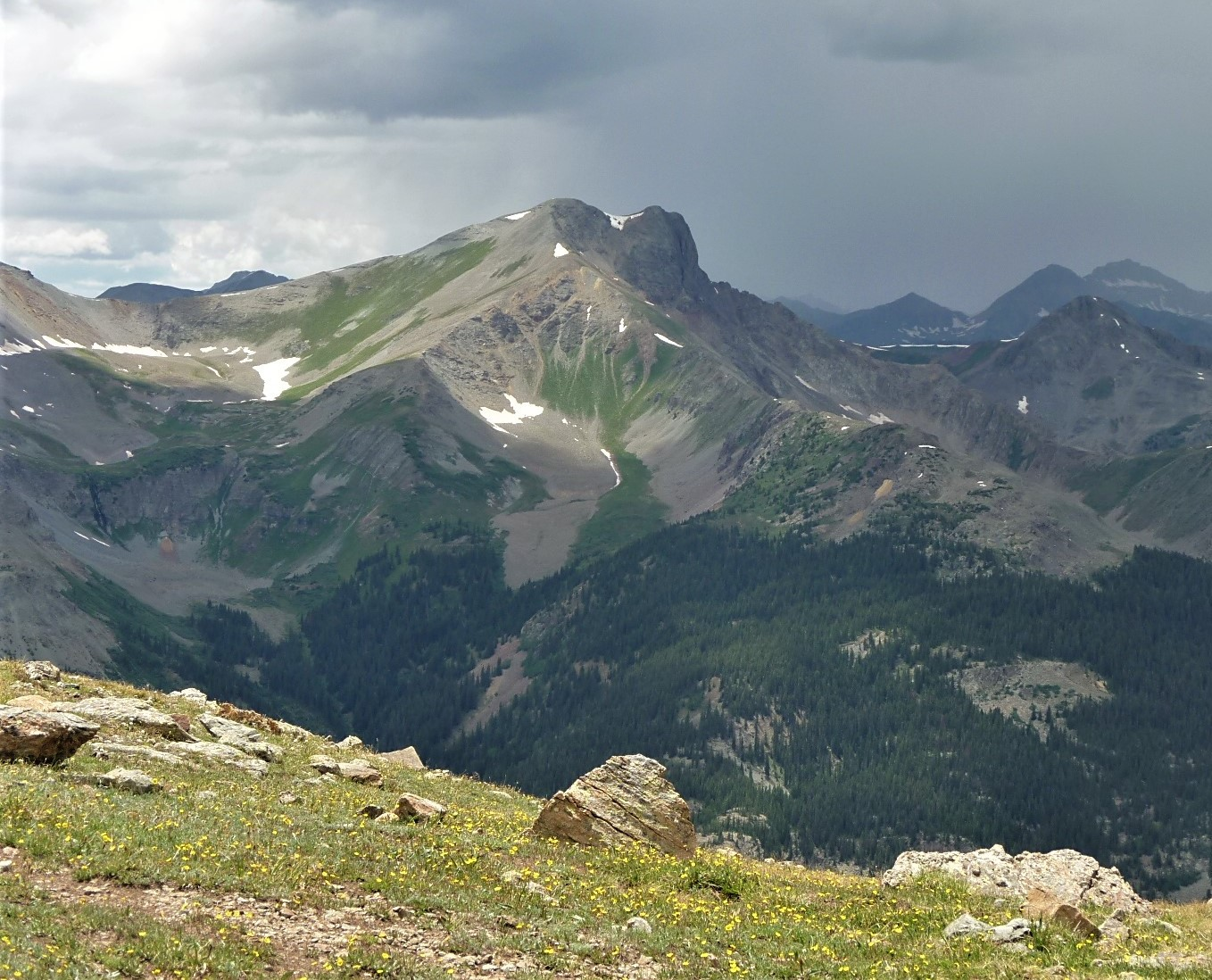
East aspect of Sultan Mountain seen from Kendall Mountain

== Climate ==
According to the Köppen climate classification system, the mountain is located in an alpine subarctic climate zone with long, cold, snowy winters, and cool to warm summers. Due to its altitude, it receives precipitation all year, as snow in winter, and as thunderstorms in summer, with a dry period in late spring.

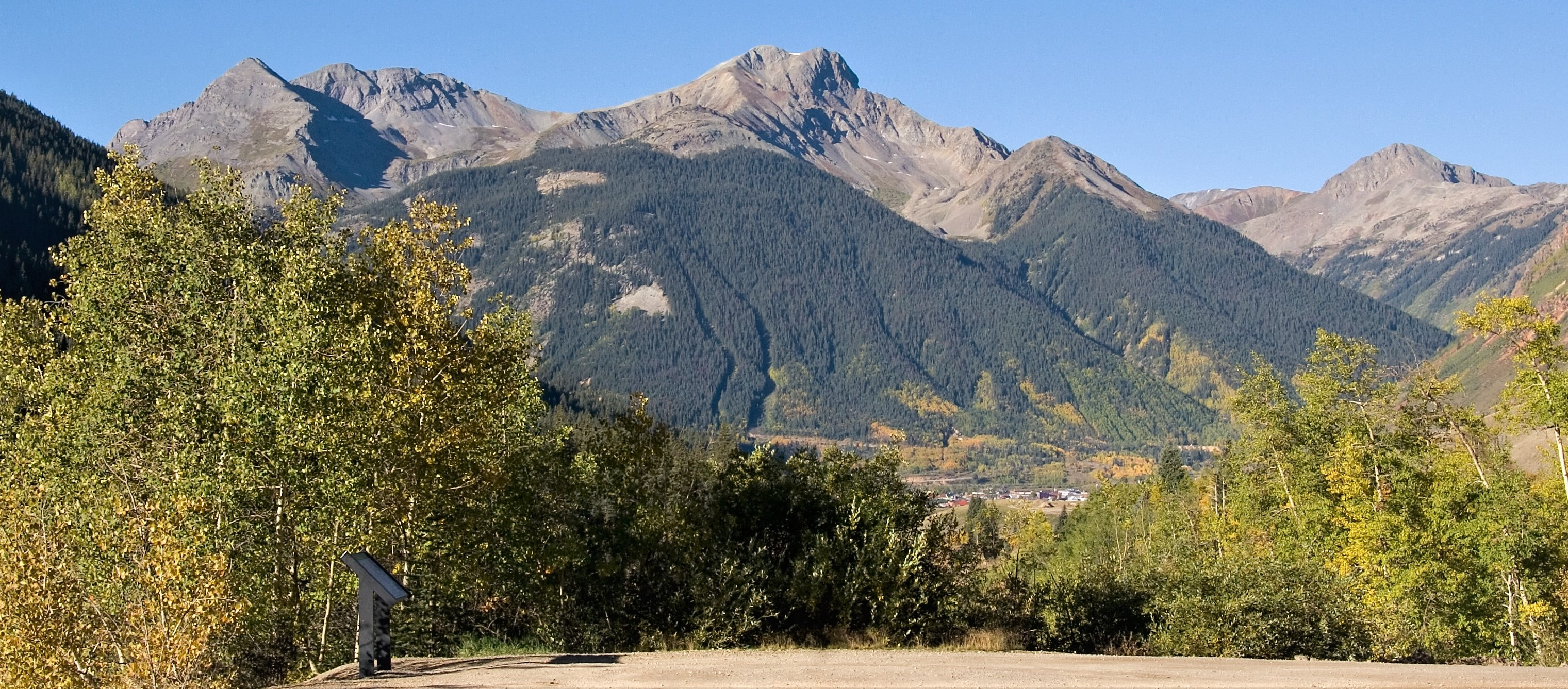
Grand Turk (left), Sultan Mountain (center), and Bear Mountain (right) viewed from northeast.

== See also ==
- List of mountain peaks of Colorado
- San Juan Mountains (Colorado)
