= Bare Mountain =

Bare Mountain may refer to:

- Bare Mountain (California), a mountain in the San Gabriel Mountains
- Bare Mountain (Massachusetts), a mountain in the Holyoke Range
- Bare Mountain (New York), a mountain in the Adirondack Mountains
- Bare Mountain (Nevada), a mountain range in Nye County

== See also ==
- Bear Mountain (disambiguation)
