= Bear Valley Springs, California =

- unincorporated community census-designated place
- Location in Kern County and the state of California

- Location in the United States
- Coordinates: 35°9.5′N 118°37.7′W
- Country: United States
- State: California
- County: Kern

Government
  - State senator: Shannon Grove (R)
  - Assemblymember: Stan Ellis (R)
  - U. S. rep.: Vince Fong (R)

Area
  - Total: 38.94 sq mi (100.86 km^{2})
  - Land: 38.88 sq mi (100.69 km^{2})
  - Water: 0.066 sq mi (0.17 km^{2}) 0.16%
- Elevation: 4,121 ft (1,256 m)

Population (2020)
  - Total: 5,592
  - Density: 143.8/sq mi (55.54/km^{2})
- Time zone: UTC-8 (PST)
  - Summer (DST): UTC-7 (PDT)
- ZIP code: 93561
- Area code: 661
- FIPS code: 06-04734
- GNIS feature ID: 1866997

Entrance gate to Bear Valley Springs

Bear Valley Springs is a guarded-gate community in Kern County, California, United States. The unincorporated community is in the Tehachapi Mountains and is part of the greater Tehachapi area. The elevation ranges from 4,121 feet (1,256 m) to 6,934 feet (2,113 m) (Bear Mountain). The population fluctuates between a low during the winter months when snow is common, to a high in the summer months when its elevation keeps it much cooler than surrounding areas and major cities. The population was 5,592 at the 2020 census, up from 5,172 at the 2010 census. For statistical purposes, the United States Census Bureau has defined Bear Valley Springs as a census-designated place (CDP). The census definition of the area may not precisely correspond to local understanding of the area with the same name.

A "Semi-Public" Community. Unlike private communities entirely owned by residents and a private homeowner association (HOA) or other private entity, Bear Valley Springs is "semi-public". Roads and infrastructure are owned by a public governmental agency—Bear Valley Community Services District (BVCSD). A homeowner association, Bear Valley Springs Association, exists and has authority over residential lots, but not the streets and public areas owned by BVCSD. BVCSD is one of only seven Community Services Districts authorized by California law to limit access to landowners and residents of the district. Due to this unique arrangement preventing general public access, BVCSD cannot receive outside public funds (i.e., county, state) for road maintenance. Instead, maintenance is entirely funded by local property taxes.

== History ==
While the nation had pushed to the western coast, the land the Fickert family settled in 1869 was still isolated and remote. For centuries, it had been the realm of Native Americans. Over the years, after purchasing squatter's rights to 160 acres (0.65 km^{2}), the Fickerts expanded their holdings until, by the 1900s their ranch encompassed a vast region of 25,000 acres (100 km^{2}).

By 1959, the last of the immediate Fickert family were gone, joining their kin who had gone before in the tiny family cemetery just up the hill from the main house.

Dart Resorts purchased the ranch from the Fickert heirs. Resource Ecology Associates was employed by Dart to plan and maintain the original natural value of the property, including wildlife. Bear Valley Springs was born.

The first sales of property were in late 1970 with a full sales team starting January 1971. The project was sold out in November 1977. The Bear Valley Springs Community Services District was formed to act as a nonprofit organization for management and maintenance of the water, roads, and police protection. The Bear Valley Springs Property Owners Association was formed to administer the amenity package. Together they insure the upkeep of the facilities of Bear Valley Springs.

The original concept was a second home destination resort where families could come to spend a weekend or longer and have a complete amenities package. The concept changed from second homes to full-time residents, approximately 3,700 homes. Former President Ronald Reagan bought a ranch in BVS. A number of athletes and TV/movie stars have made BVS their home.

== Geography ==
Bear Valley Springs is located at 35°09.5′N 118°37.7′W.

According to the United States Census Bureau, the CDP has a total area of 41.6 square miles (108 km^{2}), of which 41.5 square miles (107 km^{2}) is land and 0.07 square miles (0.18 km^{2}) (0.16%) is water.

=== Climate ===
According to the Köppen Climate Classification system, Bear Valley Springs has a semi-arid climate, abbreviated "BSk" on climate maps, with a climate similar to Tehachapi.

== Demographics ==
Historical population
Census	Pop.	Note	%±
1990	1,593		—
2000	4,232		165.7%
2010	5,172		22.2%
2020	5,592		8.1%
U.S. Decennial Census; 1860–1870 1880-1890; 1900 1910 1920; 1930 1940 1950; 1960 1970 1980; 1990 2000 2010; 2020

Bear Valley Springs first appeared as a census-designated place in the 1990 United States census.

=== Racial and ethnic composition ===
Bear Valley Springs CDP, California – Racial and ethnic composition Note: the US Census treats Hispanic/Latino as an ethnic category. This table excludes Latinos from the racial categories and assigns them to a separate category. Hispanics/Latinos may be of any race.
Race / Ethnicity (NH = Non-Hispanic)	Pop 2000	Pop 2010	Pop 2020	% 2000	% 2010	% 2020
White alone (NH)	3,624	4,500	4,430	85.63%	87.01%	79.22%
Black or African American alone (NH)	52	74	78	1.23%	1.43%	1.39%
Native American or Alaska Native alone (NH)	11	38	27	0.26%	0.73%	0.48%
Asian alone (NH)	28	54	79	0.66%	1.04%	1.41%
Native Hawaiian or Pacific Islander alone (NH)	2	3	1	0.05%	0.06%	0.02%
Other race alone (NH)	17	7	27	0.40%	0.14%	0.48%
Mixed race or Multiracial (NH)	166	97	257	3.92%	1.88%	4.60%
Hispanic or Latino (any race)	332	399	693	7.84%	7.71%	12.39%
Total	4,232	5,172	5,592	100.00%	100.00%	100.00%

=== 2020 census ===
As of the 2020 census, Bear Valley Springs had a population of 5,592 and a population density of 143.8 inhabitants per square mile (55.5/km^{2}). The age distribution was 18.7% under the age of 18, 4.9% aged 18 to 24, 16.6% aged 25 to 44, 29.6% aged 45 to 64, and 30.1% who were 65 years of age or older. The median age was 54.9 years. For every 100 females, there were 95.9 males, and for every 100 females age 18 and over, there were 94.9 males.

The census reported that 100.0% of the population lived in households, 1 person (0.0%) lived in non-institutionalized group quarters, and no one was institutionalized. Additionally, 0.0% of residents lived in urban areas, while 100.0% lived in rural areas.

There were 2,306 households, of which 21.4% had children under the age of 18 living in them. Of all households, 66.8% were married-couple households, 3.6% were cohabiting couple households, 13.4% had a male householder with no spouse or partner present, and 16.1% had a female householder with no spouse or partner present. About 21.0% of all households were made up of individuals, and 12.9% had someone living alone who was 65 years of age or older. The average household size was 2.42. There were 1,732 families (75.1% of all households).

There were 2,759 housing units at an average density of 71.0 units per square mile (27.4 units/km^{2}). Of all housing units, 16.4% were vacant and 83.6% were occupied. Of occupied units, 90.9% were owner-occupied and 9.1% were occupied by renters. The homeowner vacancy rate was 3.6% and the rental vacancy rate was 6.2%.

=== 2023 estimates ===
In 2023, the US Census Bureau estimated that 16.2% of the population were foreign-born. Of all people aged 5 or older, 89.0% spoke only English at home, 5.2% spoke Spanish, 2.5% spoke other Indo-European languages, 3.0% spoke Asian or Pacific Islander languages, and 0.3% spoke other languages. Of those aged 25 or older, 95.1% were high school graduates and 42.1% had a bachelor's degree.

The median household income was $121,069, and the per capita income was $54,722. About 2.3% of families and 4.7% of the population were below the poverty line.
