= Bear Mountain (North Cascades) =

Mountain in Washington (state), United States

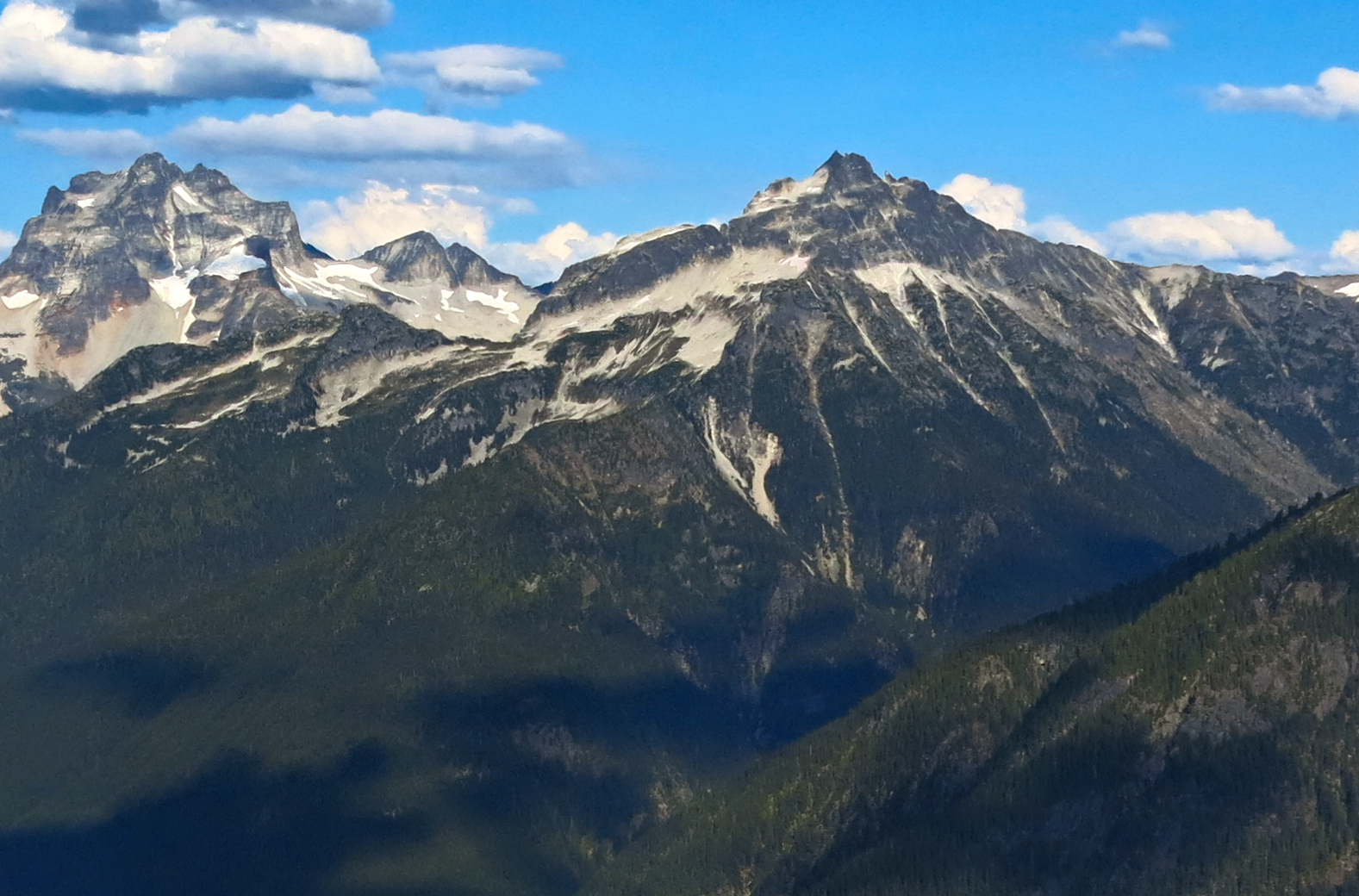
- Bear Mountain (right) seen from Copper Ridge with its parent, Mt. Redoubt to left

Highest point
- Elevation: 7,931 ft (2,417 m)
- Prominence: 1,388 ft (423 m)
- Parent peak: Mount Redoubt
- Isolation: 2.36 mi (3.80 km)
- Coordinates: 48°55′50″N 121°20′28″W

Naming
- Native name: Klahaihu (Halkomelem)

Geography
- Location within Washington (state) Location within the United States
- Interactive map of Bear Mountain
- Location: Whatcom County, Washington, U.S.
- Parent range: Cascade Range
- Topo map: USGS Mount Redoubt

Geology
- Rock age: 26 to 29 million years
- Rock type(s): Skagit gneiss and granodiorite
- Volcanic belt: Pemberton Volcanic Belt

Climbing
- First ascent: 1939 Calder Bressler and William Thompson
- Easiest route: Northwest Ridge Class 3-4

Bear Mountain is a remote 7,931-foot (2,417-metre) mountain summit in the Skagit Range of the North Cascades of Washington state. Bear Mountain is situated in North Cascades National Park. Its nearest higher peak is Mount Redoubt, 2.36 mi (3.80 km) to the northeast. Precipitation runoff from Bear Mountain drains into Bear Creek and Indian Creek, both tributaries of the Chilliwack River. Access, either by the Chilliwack River Trail or from British Columbia, Canada, is difficult and takes two to three days.

== Routes ==
- Diamond Life
- East Ridge
- North Buttress Direct
- North Buttress West
- North Face Buttress
- Northwest Buttress
- Northwest Ridge
- South Route
- The Diamond
- Ursa Major
- Ursa Minor

== Climate ==
Bear Mountain is located in the marine west coast climate zone of western North America. Most weather fronts originate in the Pacific Ocean, and travel northeast toward the Cascade Mountains. As fronts approach the North Cascades, they are forced upward by the peaks of the Cascade Range, causing them to drop their moisture in the form of rain or snowfall onto the Cascades. As a result, the west side of the North Cascades experiences high precipitation, especially during the winter months in the form of snowfall. During winter months, weather is usually cloudy, but, due to high pressure systems over the Pacific Ocean that intensify during summer months, there is often little or no cloud cover during the summer. Because of maritime influence, snow tends to be wet and heavy, resulting in high avalanche danger.

== Geology ==
The North Cascades features some of the most rugged topography in the Cascade Range with craggy peaks, ridges, and deep glacial valleys. Geological events occurring many years ago created the diverse topography and drastic elevation changes over the Cascade Range leading to the various climate differences.

The history of the formation of the Cascade Mountains dates back millions of years ago to the late Eocene Epoch. With the North American Plate overriding the Pacific Plate, episodes of volcanic igneous activity persisted. In addition, small fragments of the oceanic and continental lithosphere called terranes created the North Cascades about 50 million years ago.

During the Pleistocene period dating back over two million years ago, glaciation advancing and retreating repeatedly scoured and shaped the landscape. The U-shaped cross section of the river valleys is a result of recent glaciation. Uplift and faulting in combination with glaciation have been the dominant processes which have created the tall peaks and deep valleys of the North Cascades area.

== Gallery ==
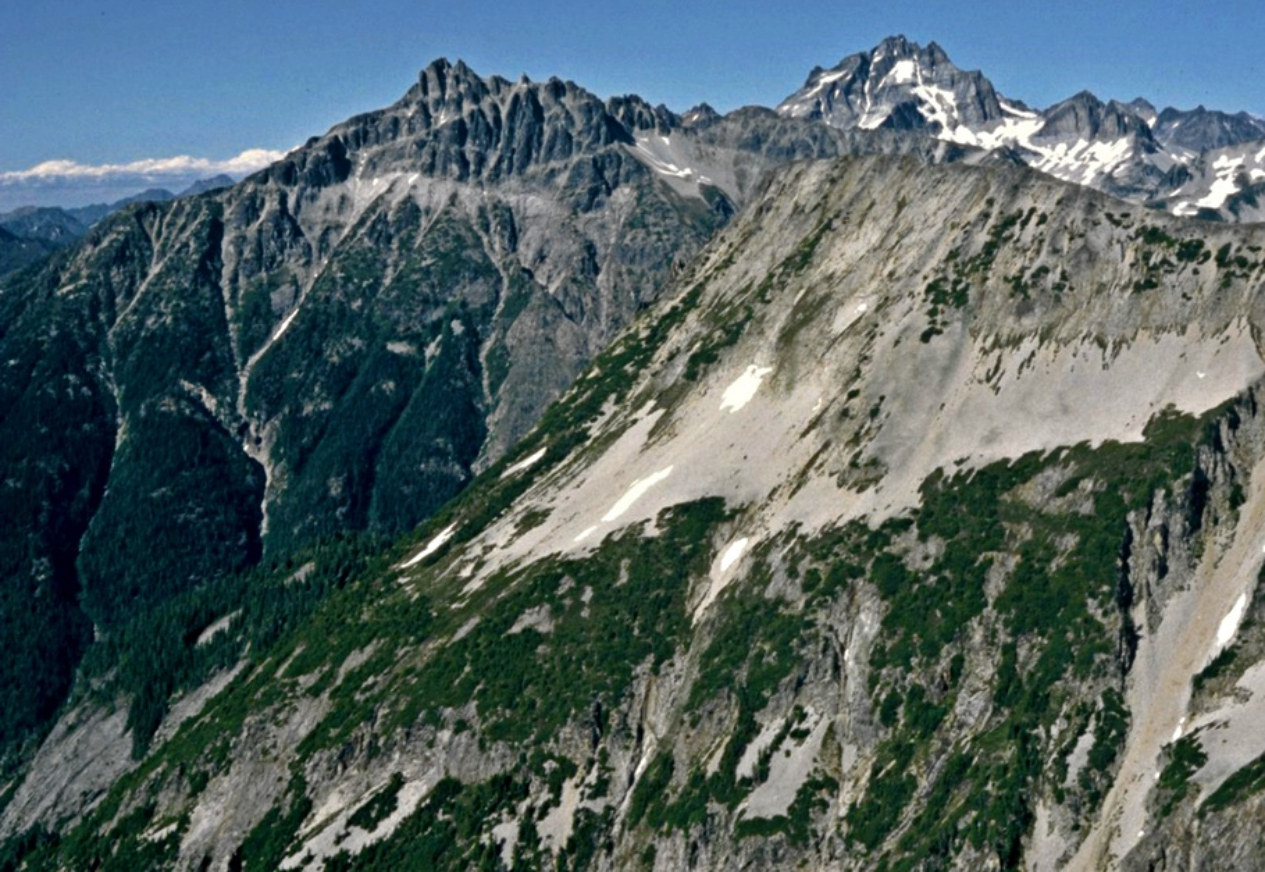
Bear Mountain (left) and Redoubt (right)

== See also ==
- North Cascades
- Chilliwack River
