= Bear Mountain (Nevada) =

Mountain in Nevada, United States

Coordinates: 41°55′21″N 114°54′23″W

Bear Mountain is a summit in the U.S. state of Nevada. The elevation is 6,952 feet (2,119 m).

Bear Mountain was named for the bears which roamed there.
