= Bear Mountain (Fresno County, California) =

Mountain in the Sierra Nevada foothills, California

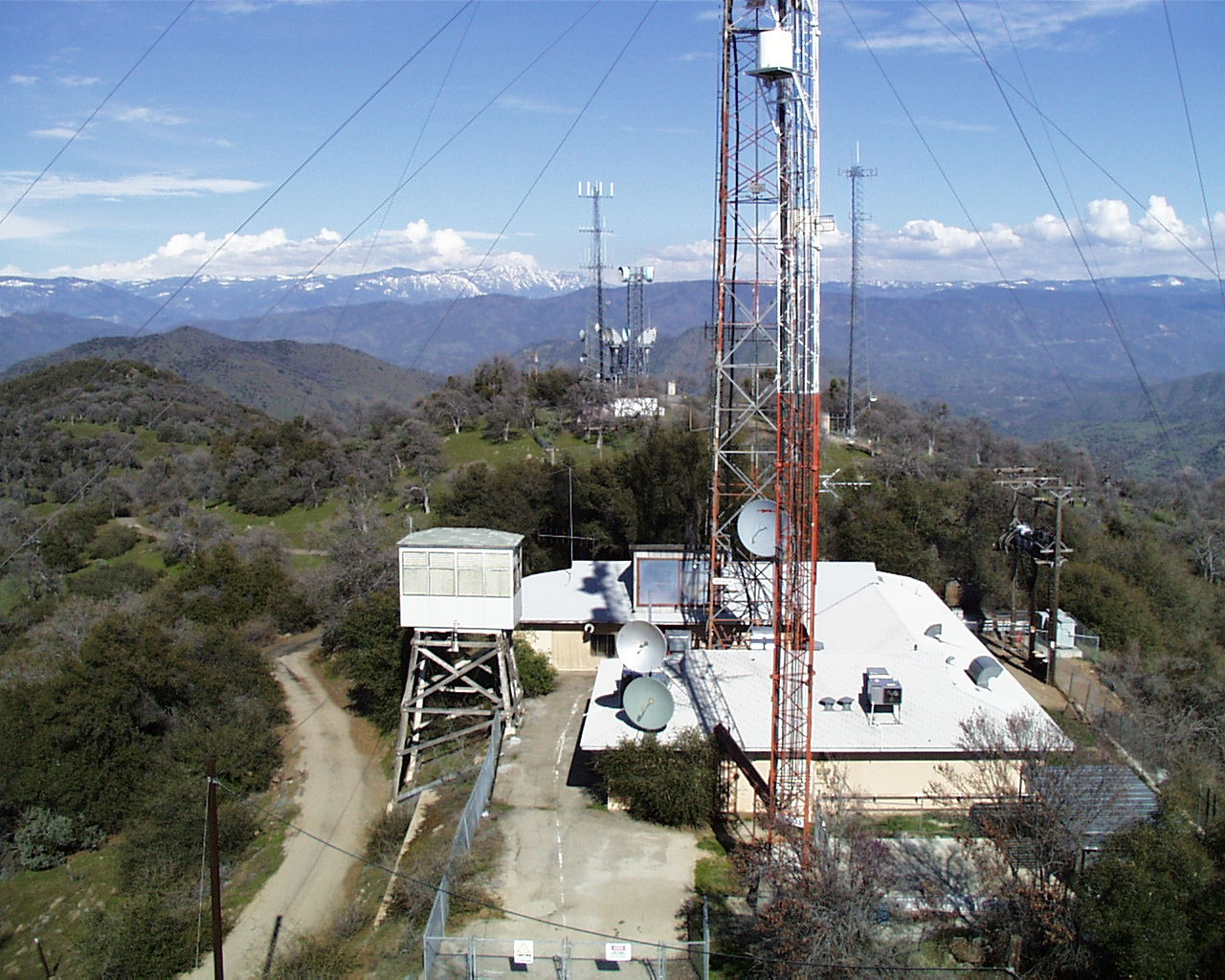
- The fire lookout amid telecommunications equipment

Highest point
- Elevation: 3,355 ft (1,023 m)
- Prominence: 1,395 ft (425 m)
- Coordinates: 36°44′48″N 119°16′48″W

Geography
- Location within California Location within the United States
- Location: Fresno County, California, US
- Topo map: USGS Orange Cove North

Bear Mountain is a peak in the Sierra Nevada foothills, near Yokuts Valley, California, United States.

In the early 1900s, a fire lookout tower was constructed on the mountain. Now the site is mostly used to support communications equipment.
