= Bear Mountain (South Dakota) =

Mountain in South Dakota, United States

- Location within South Dakota

Highest point
- Elevation: 7,166 ft (2,184 m) NGVD 29
- Coordinates: 43°52′12″N 103°44′39″W

Geography
- Location: Pennington County, South Dakota, U.S.
- Parent range: Black Hills
- Topo map: USGS Berne

Climbing
- Easiest route: Hike

Bear Mountain is a mountain located in western Pennington County, South Dakota. It is the 3rd highest point in the Black Hills. There is a fire lookout tower on the summit.
