= Bear Mountain (Kern County, California) =

Peak in the Tehachapi Mountains

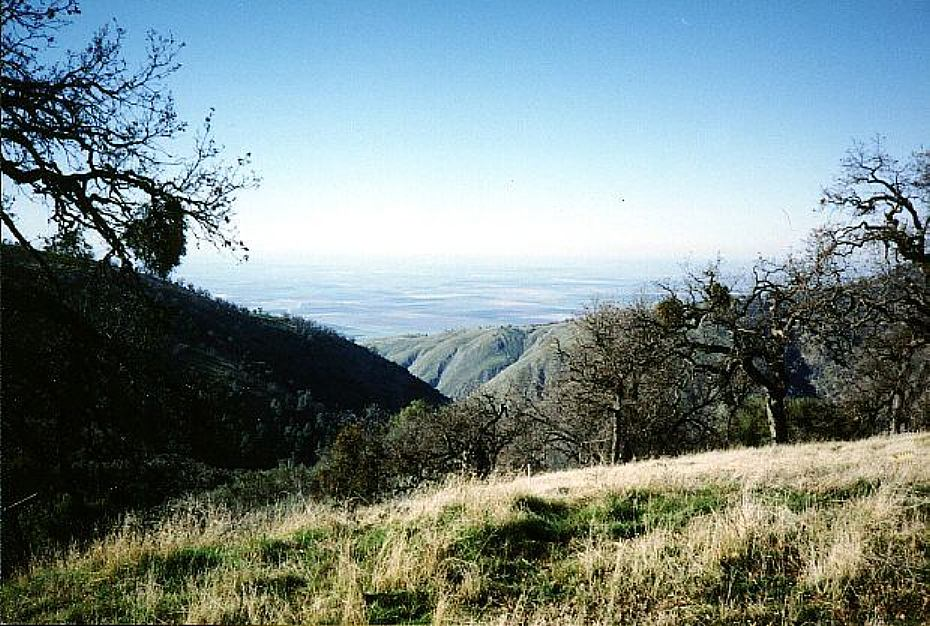
- View west from Bear Mountain

Highest point
- Elevation: 6,916 ft (2,108 m) NAVD 88
- Prominence: 2,600 ft (792 m)
- Coordinates: 35°12′17″N 118°38′17″W

Geography
- Location within California Location within the United States
- Location: Kern County, California, U.S.
- Parent range: Tehachapi Mountains
- Topo map: USGS Bear Mountain

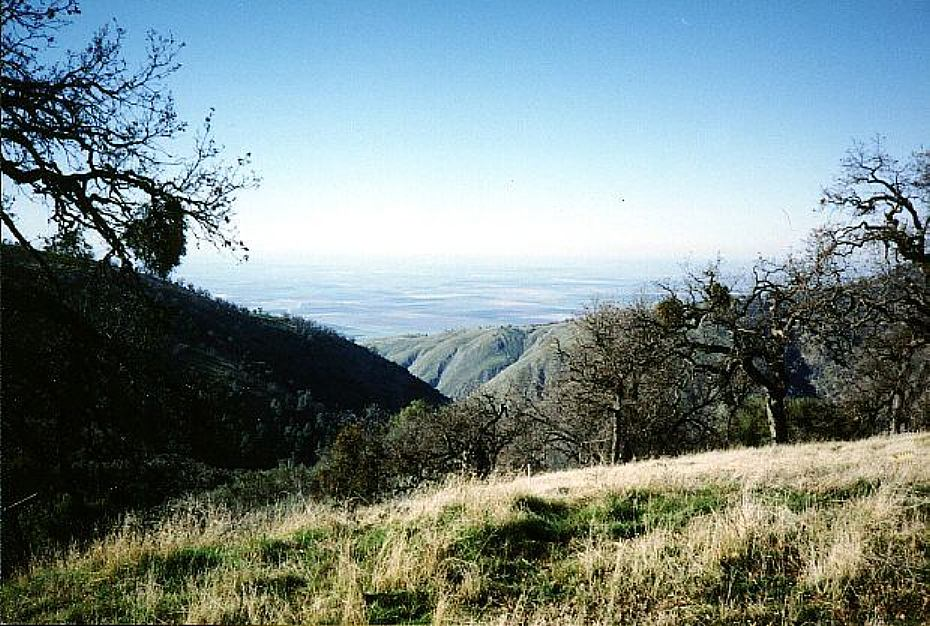
Looking west from Bear Mountain

Bear Mountain is a peak in the Tehachapi Mountains, near Tehachapi, California.

The mountain is north of Bear Valley Springs and west of the Tehachapi Loop, a spiral on the railroad line through Tehachapi Pass. California condors, mountain lions, mule deer, and bobcats can be found among the sugar pines trees.

Much of the mountain is on land owned by The Nature Conservancy.
