= Bear Mountain (Santa Clara County, California) =

Mountain in California, United States

Coordinates: 37°13′44″N 121°26′18″W

Bear Mountain is a mountain summit along the crest of the Diablo Range in Santa Clara County, California. Its summit lies at an elevation of 2,477 feet (755 meters).
