= Bear Mountain Ski Hill =

Ski area in British Columbia, Canada

- Interactive map of Bear Mountain Ski Hill
- Location: British Columbia, Canada
- Nearest major city: Dawson Creek
- Coordinates: 55.73150°0′0″N 120.44616°0′0″W
- Vertical: 150 meters (490 ft)
- Top elevation: 990 meters (3,250 ft)
- Base elevation: 840 meters (2,760 ft)
- Trails: 10
- Terrain parks: 1

Bear Mountain Ski Hill is a ski area located on the outskirts of Dawson Creek, British Columbia, Canada. It was built in 1959 and has a T-Bar and ten runs (beginner to intermediate). It is operated by the Bear Mountain Ski and Recreation Club. It is in the same vicinity as a large cross-country ski trail network operated by the Bear Mountain Nordic Ski Association.

The slope has 10 runs (Main, Bradford, West, Havards, Big Bear, Knox, Old Road, Easy Way Down, Bobs Run and the Chute), a terrain park and 7 cross-country ski trails.
