= Bear Mountain (San Juan County, Colorado) =

Mountain in Colorado, United States

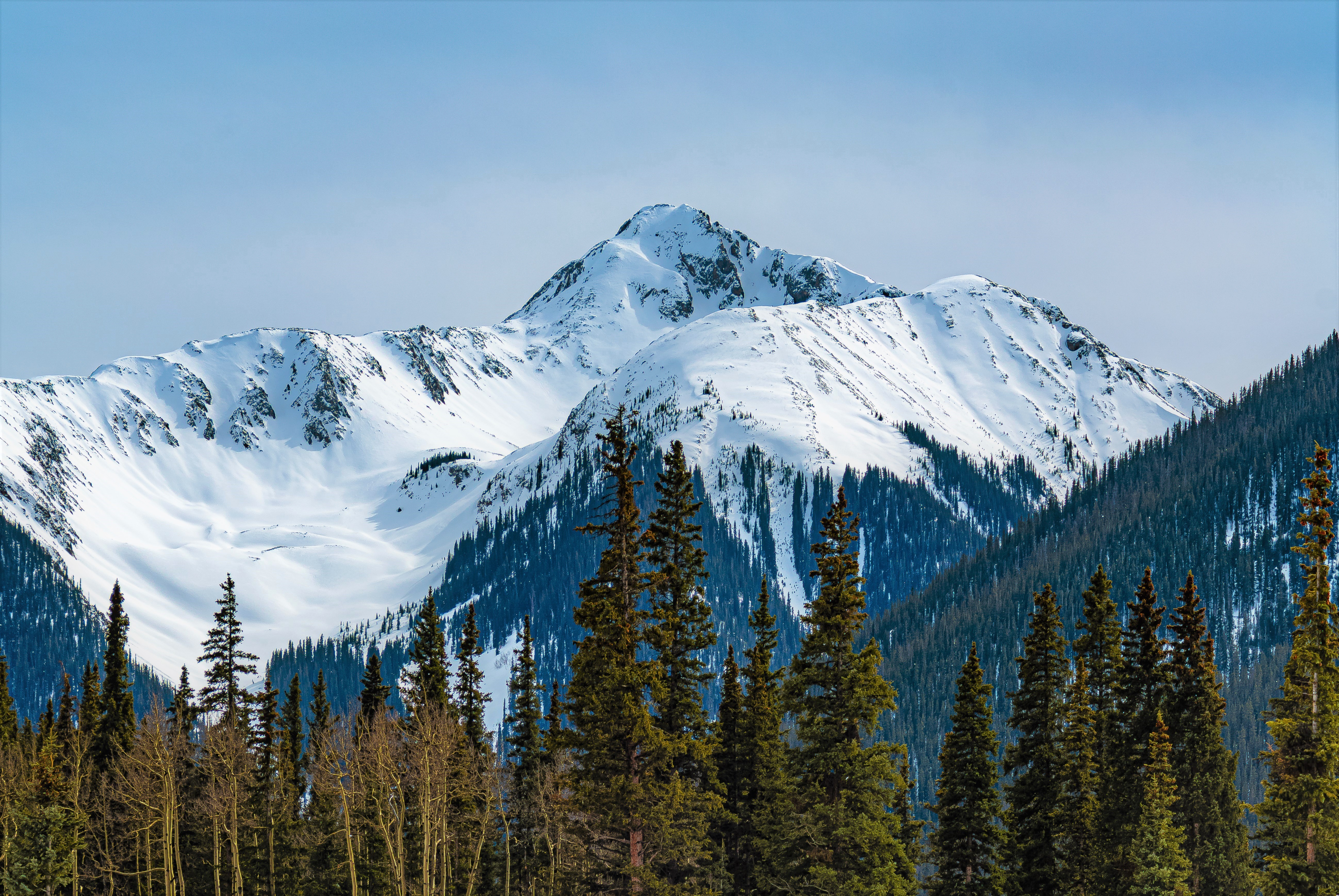
- North aspect

Highest point
- Elevation: 12,987 ft (3,958 m)
- Prominence: 547 ft (167 m)
- Parent peak: V 7 (13,043 ft)
- Isolation: 1.29 mi (2.08 km)
- Coordinates: 37°47′40″N 107°43′58″W

Geography
- Location within Colorado Location within the United States
- Location: San Juan County; Colorado, US
- Parent range: Rocky Mountains; San Juan Mountains
- Topo map: USGS Silverton

Climbing
- Easiest route: class 2

Bear Mountain is a 12,987-foot-elevation (3,958-meter) mountain summit located in San Juan County, Colorado, United States.

== Description ==
Bear Mountain is situated 3.5 miles west-southwest of the community of Silverton, on land managed by San Juan National Forest. Bear Mountain is part of the San Juan Mountains which are a subset of the Rocky Mountains and is west of the Continental Divide. Precipitation runoff from the mountain drains into Bear Creek and South Fork Mineral Creek which are tributaries of the Animas River. Topographic relief is significant as the north aspect rises 3,300 feet (1,000 meters) above South Fork Mineral Creek in approximately 1.5 mile, and the east aspect rises 2,300 feet (700 meters) above Bear Creek in one-half-mile. The mountain's toponym has been officially adopted by the United States Board on Geographic Names, and has been in publications since at least 1906, if not earlier. Of the approximately 100 landforms in the United States named "Bear Mountain", this one ranks as the highest elevation.

== Climate ==
According to the Köppen climate classification system, Bear Mountain is located in an alpine subarctic climate zone with long, cold, snowy winters, and cool to warm summers. Due to its altitude, it receives precipitation all year, as snow in winter, and as thunderstorms in summer, with a dry period in late spring.

== Gallery ==
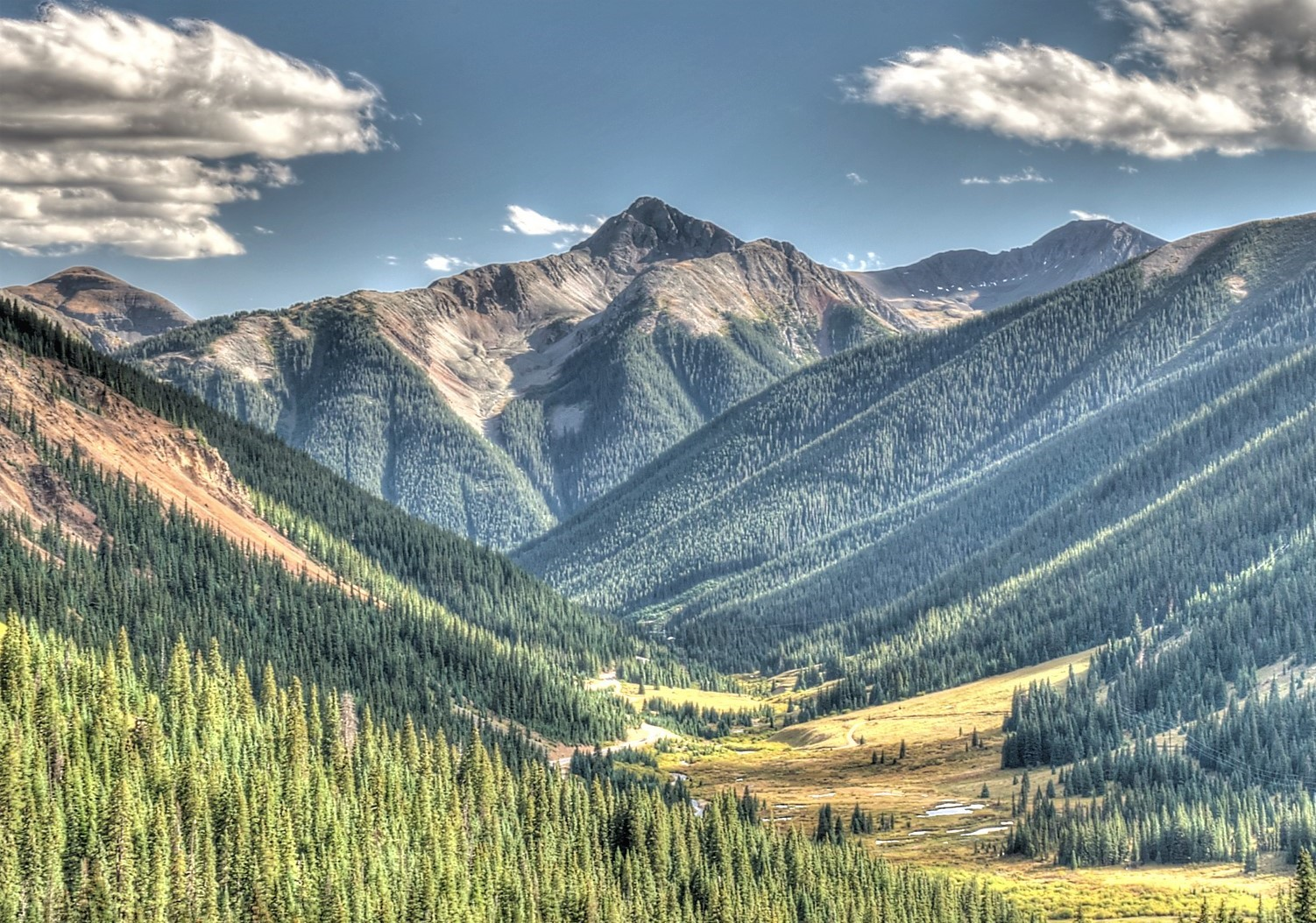
Bear Mountain

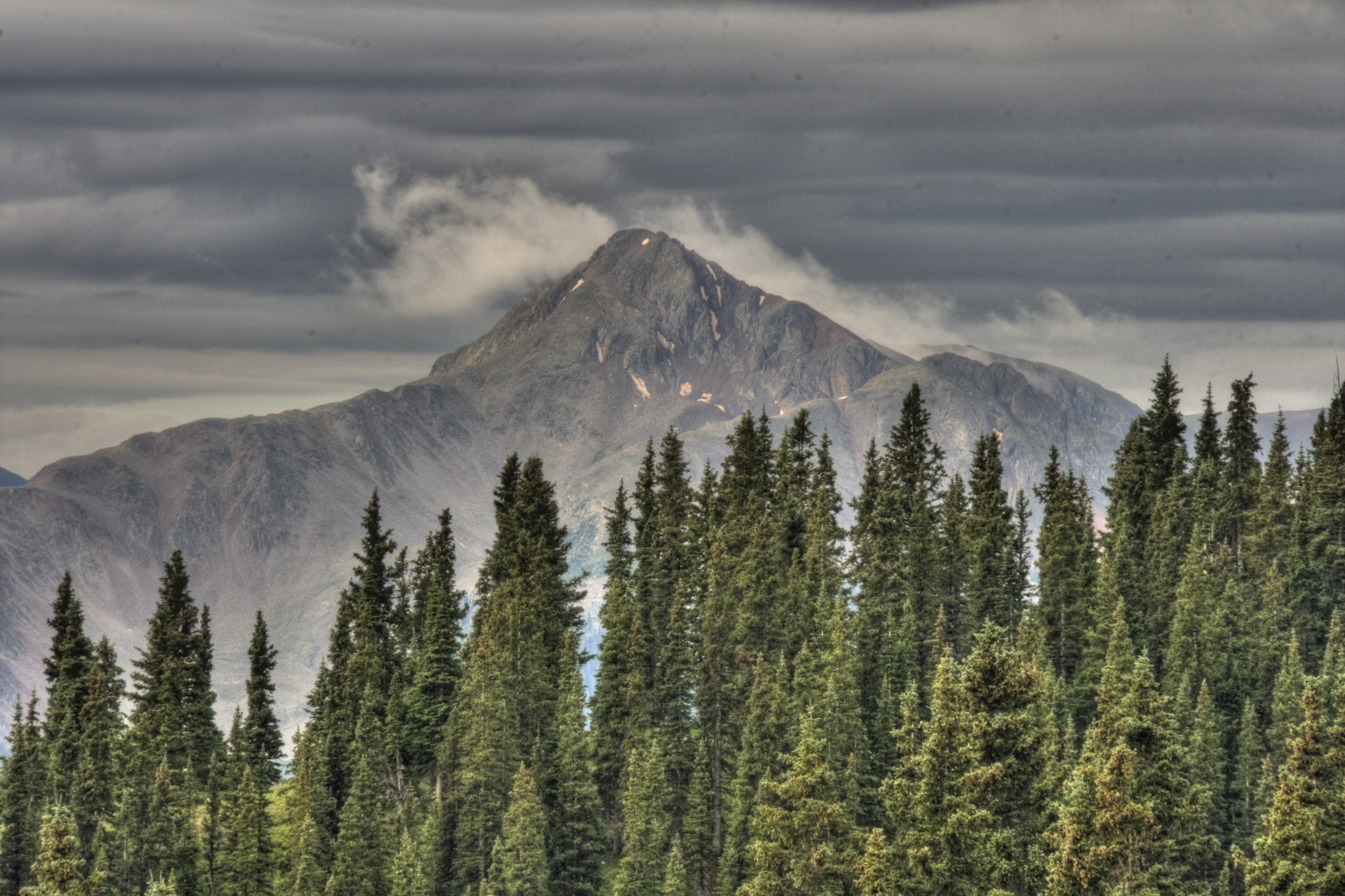
Bear Mountain

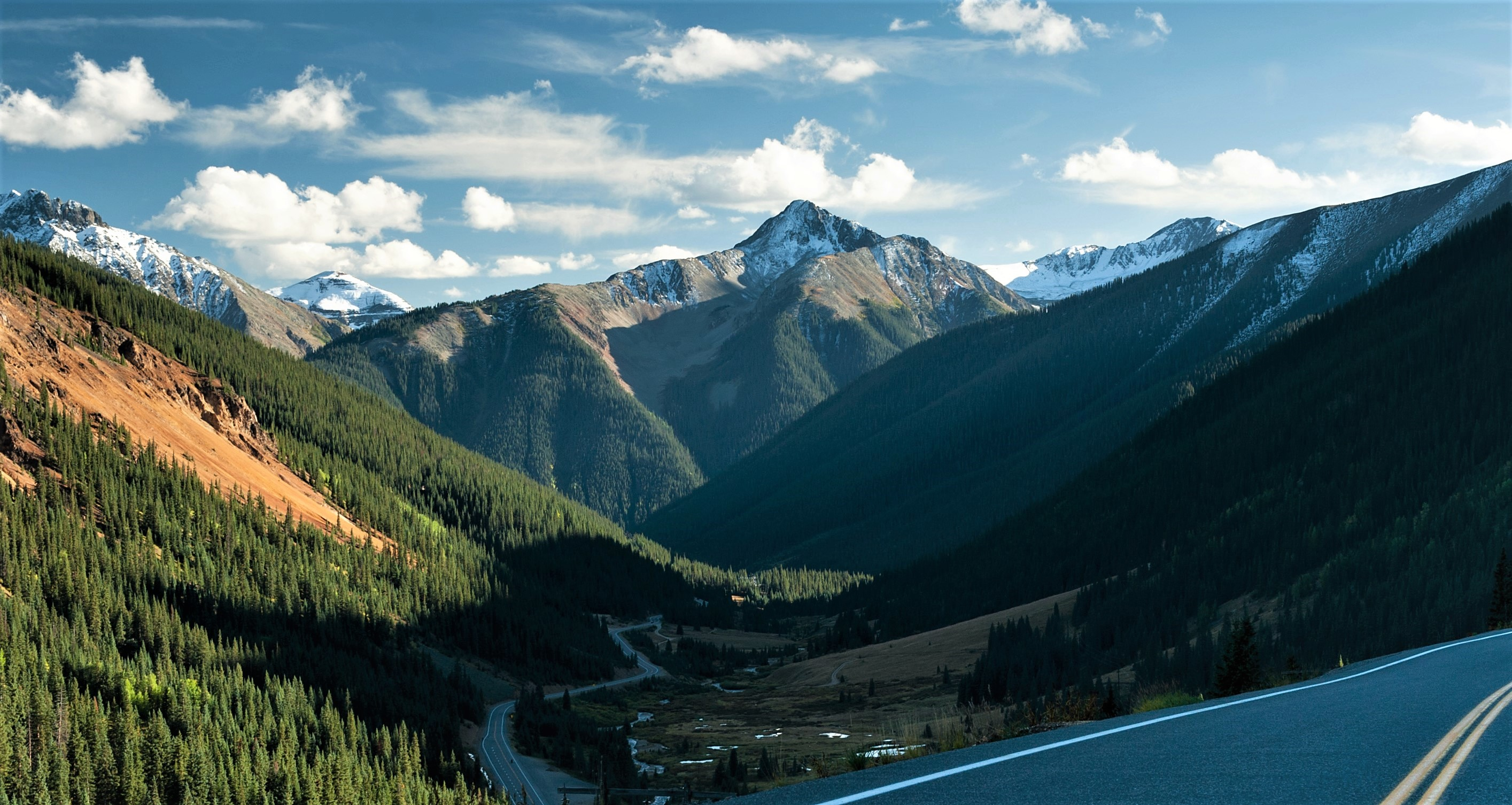
Bear Mountain from the Million Dollar Highway

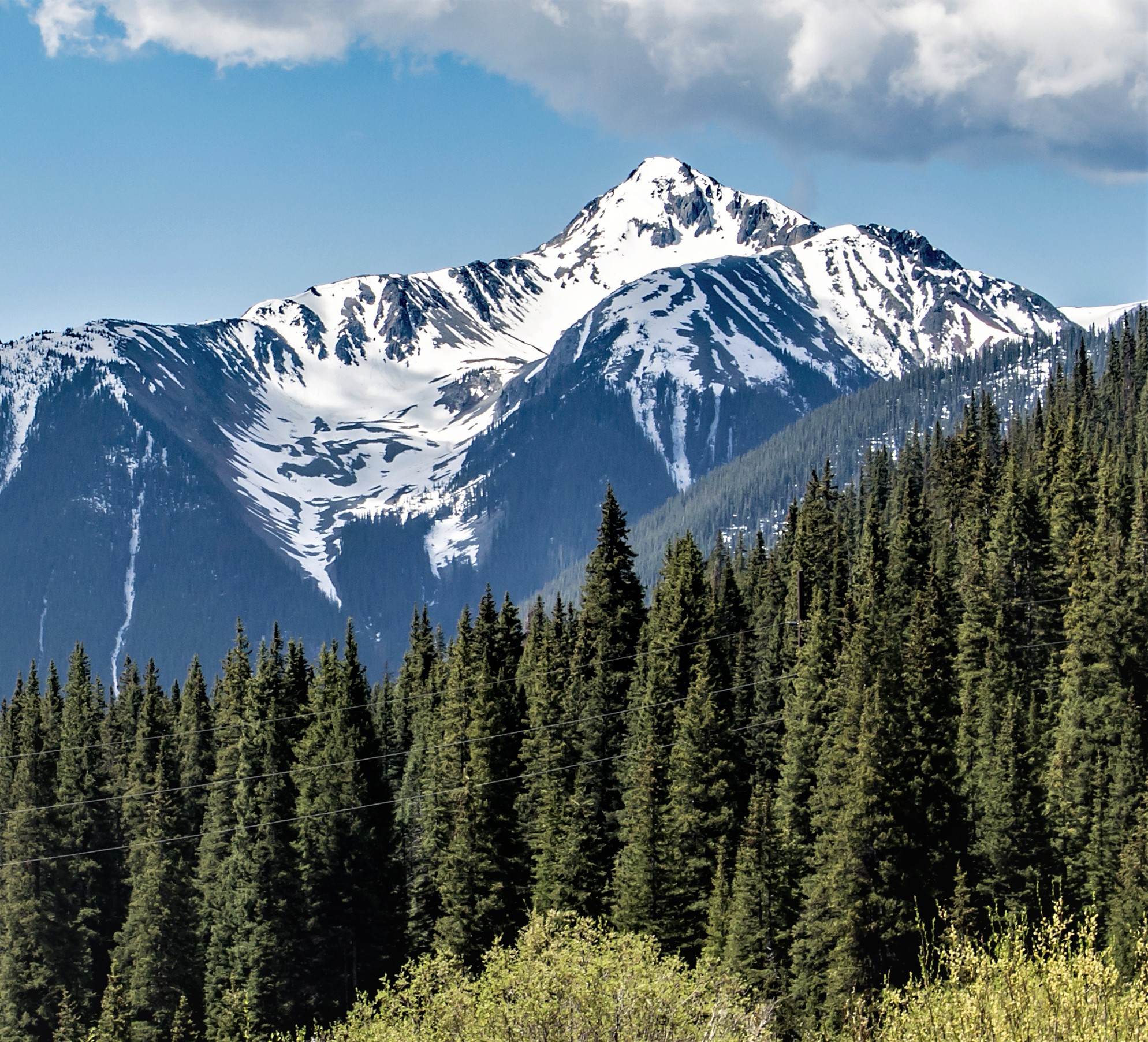

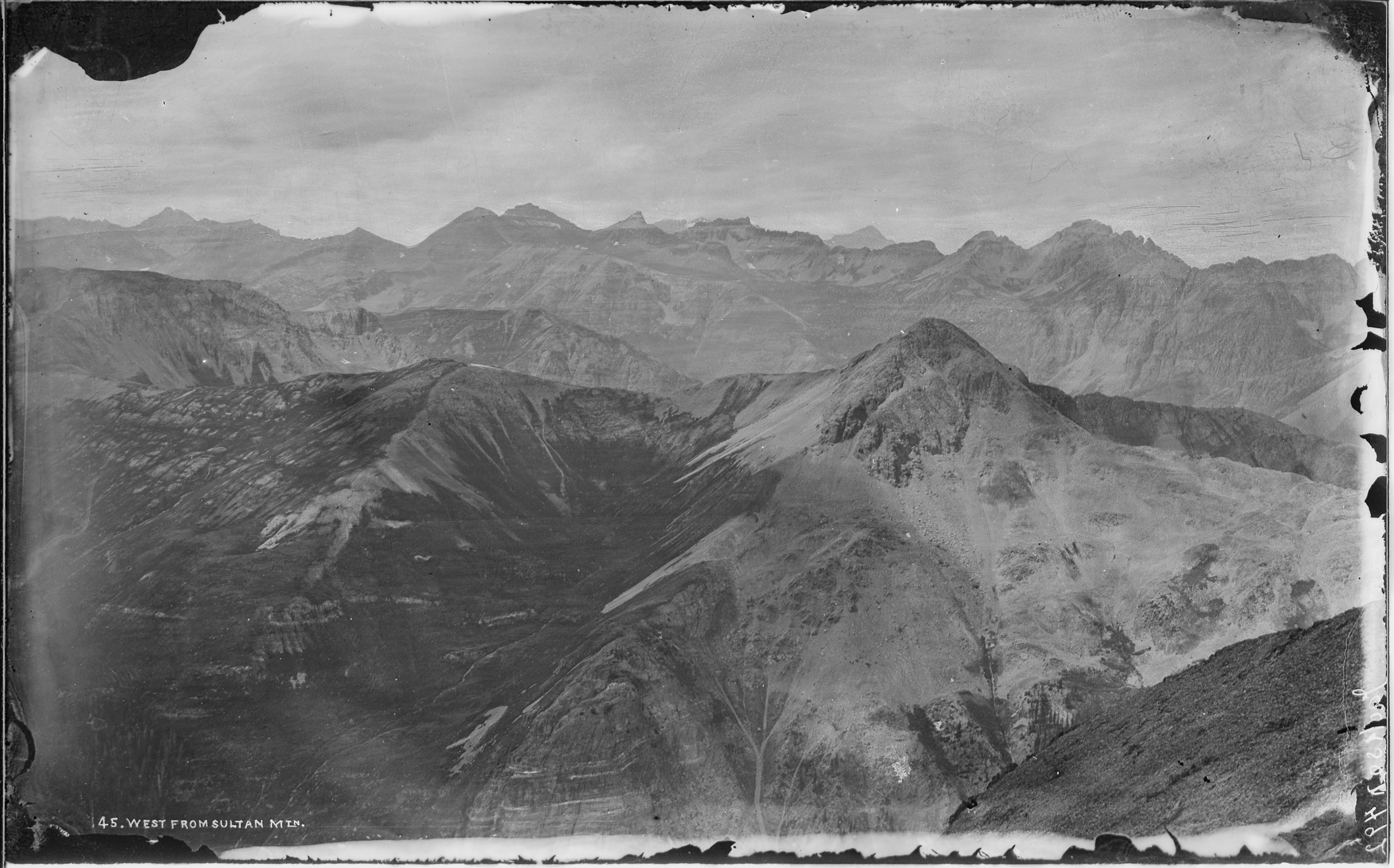
Historic 1874 image of Bear Mountain (lower right) viewed from Sultan Mountain

== See also ==
- Mountains of San Juan County, Colorado
- List of peaks named Bear Mountain
